= List of Universal Pictures films (1950–1959) =

This is a list of films produced or distributed by Universal Pictures in 1950–1959, founded in 1912 as the Universal Film Manufacturing Company. It is the main motion picture production and distribution arm of Universal Studios, a subsidiary of the NBCUniversal division of Comcast.

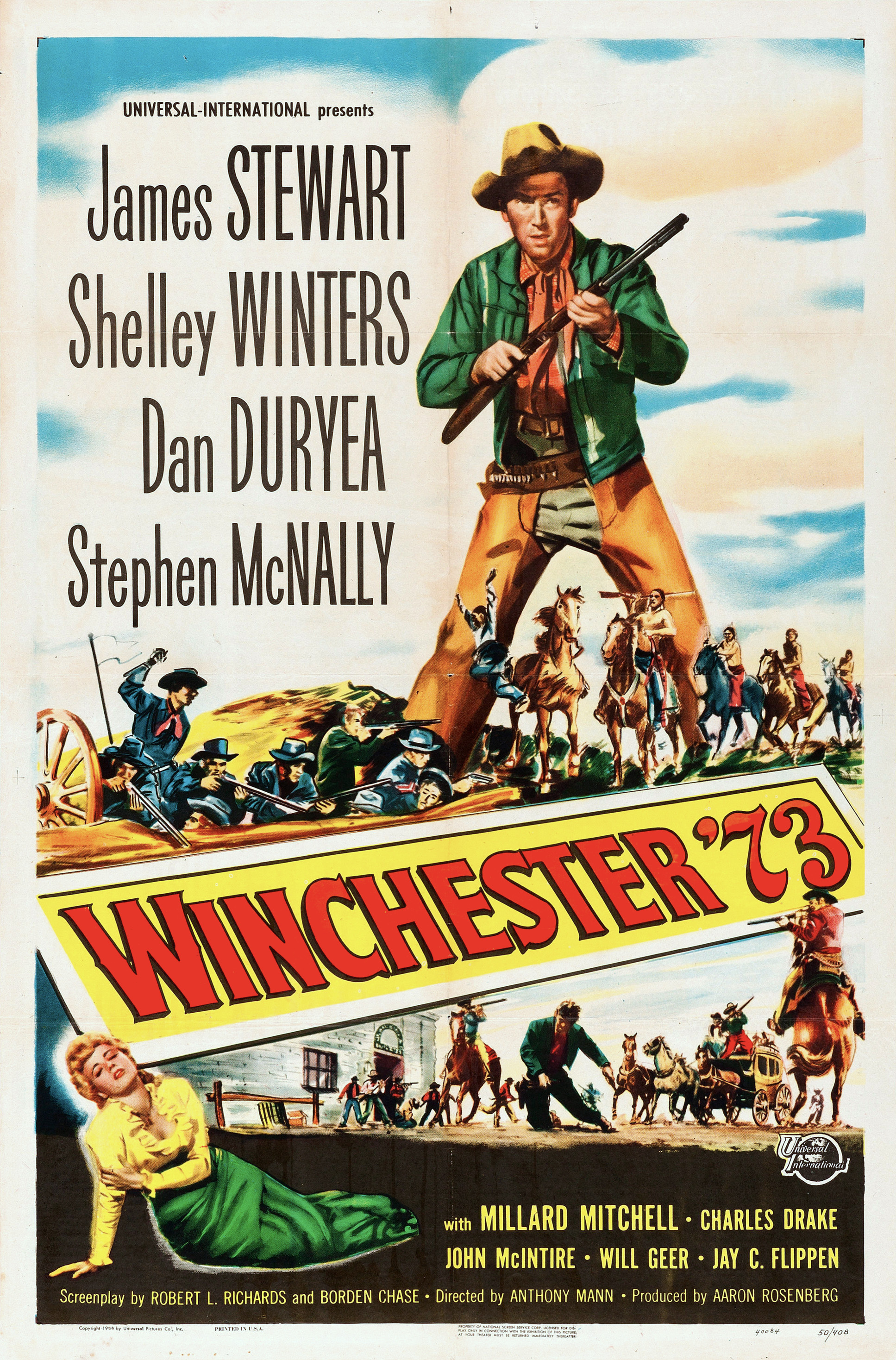
Poster for Winchester 73 (1950)

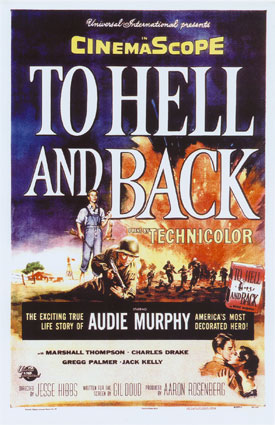
Poster for To Hell and Back (1955)

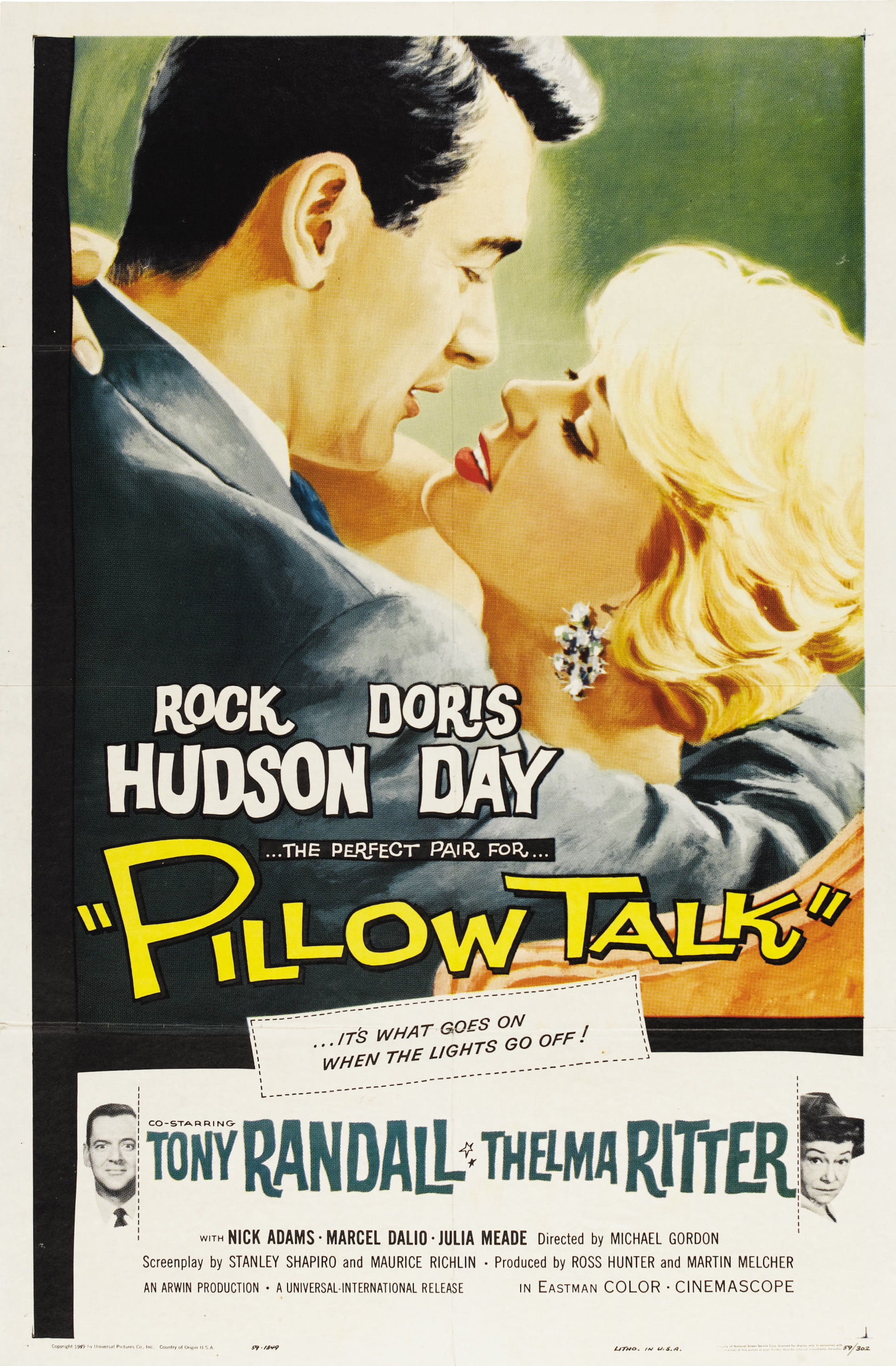
Poster for Pillow Talk (1959)

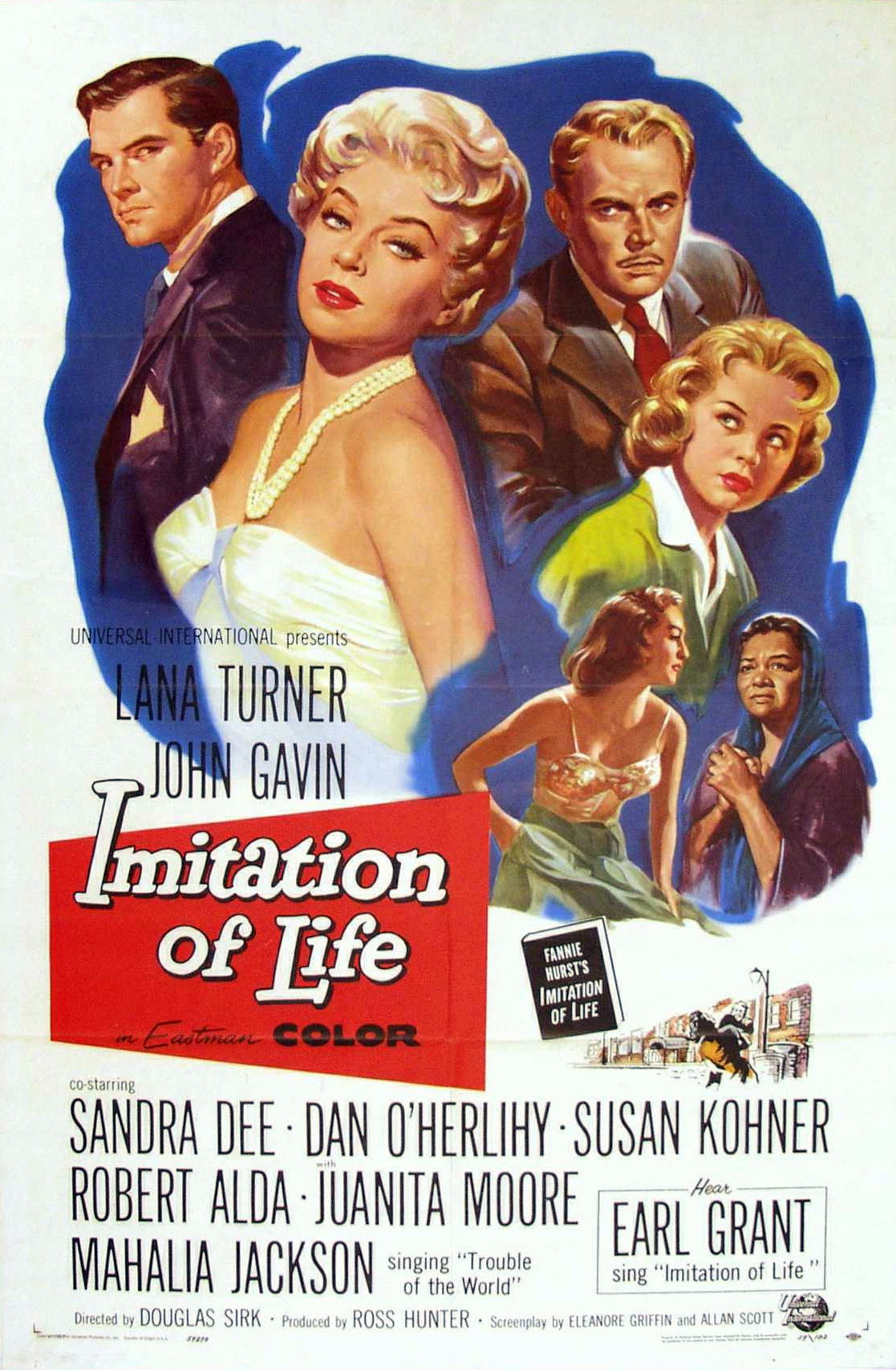
Poster for Imitation of Life (1959)

== 1950 ==
Release date	Title	Notes
January 5, 1950	Sons of Matthew	U.S. distribution only as The Rugged O'Riordans; co-production with the Greater Union Organisation
January 6, 1950	Woman in Hiding	
February 8, 1950	Francis	
February 8, 1950	Outside the Wall	
February 14, 1950	The Astonished Heart (Note: Owned by MGM (via United Artists))	U.S. distribution
March 1, 1950	The Kid from Texas	
March 1, 1950	Buccaneer's Girl	
March 1, 1950	Borderline	distribution only; produced by Milton H. Bren and William A. Seiter Productions and Borderline Pictures Corporation
April 1, 1950	One Way Street	
April 1, 1950	Ma and Pa Kettle Go to Town	
May 1, 1950	Comanche Territory	
May 13, 1950	I Was a Shoplifter	
May 25, 1950	Curtain Call at Cactus Creek	
May 31, 1950	Louisa	
June 1, 1950	Sierra	
June 8, 1950	Spy Hunt	
July 1, 1950	Peggy	
July 12, 1950	Winchester '73	
August 5, 1950	Abbott and Costello in the Foreign Legion	
August 5, 1950	The Desert Hawk	
August 30, 1950	South Sea Sinner	
August 31, 1950	Madeleine	U.S. distribution
September 1, 1950	Shakedown	
September 21, 1950	Saddle Tramp	
October 12, 1950	Woman on the Run	distribution only; produced by Fidelity Pictures Corporation
October 16, 1950	The Sleeping City	
October 17, 1950	The Milkman	
October 18, 1950	Wyoming Mail	
November 1, 1950	Deported	
November 2, 1950	Undercover Girl	
November 15, 1950	Kansas Raiders	
December 1950	Mystery Submarine	
December 21, 1950	Harvey	
December 25, 1950	Frenchie	

== 1951 ==
Release date	Title	Notes
January 23, 1951	The Groom Wore Spurs	distribution only; produced by Fidelity Pictures Corporation
January 26, 1951	Under the Gun	
February 5, 1951	Tomahawk	
March 3, 1951	Target Unknown	
March 5, 1951	Up Front	
March 7, 1951	Abbott and Costello Meet the Invisible Man	
March 14, 1951	Air Cadet	
April 1, 1951	Katie Did It	
April 5, 1951	Bedtime for Bonzo	
April 26, 1951	Double Crossbones	
April 1951	Apache Drums	
May 1, 1951	Francis Goes to the Races	
May 10, 1951	Ma and Pa Kettle Back on the Farm	
May 18, 1951	Smuggler's Island	
May 19, 1951	The Fat Man	
June 1, 1951	Hollywood Story	
July 2, 1951	The Prince Who Was a Thief	
July 24, 1951	The Mark of the Renegade	
July 26, 1951	Comin' Round the Mountain	
August 1951	Bright Victory	Nominee of the Golden Globe Award for best Motion - Drama
August 8, 1951	Cattle Drive	
August 29, 1951	Little Egypt	
September 1, 1951	The Lady from Texas	
September 20, 1951	Iron Man	
September 23, 1951	You Never Can Tell	
October 17, 1951	Thunder on the Hill	
October 1951	The Lady Pays Off	
October 1951	The Golden Horde	
October 1951	Reunion in Reno	
November 1951	The Raging Tide	
November 1951	Cave of Outlaws	
December 8, 1951	The Strange Door	
December 19, 1951	Flame of Araby	
December 1951	Week-End with Father	

== 1952 ==
Release date	Title	Notes
January 13, 1952	The Cimarron Kid	
January 23, 1952	Bend of the River	
January 1952	Finders Keepers	
February 23, 1952	Here Come the Nelsons	
March 1, 1952	The Treasure of Lost Canyon	
March 27, 1952	Flesh and Fury	
April 1, 1952	Meet Danny Wilson	
May 1, 1952	Bronco Buster	
May 9, 1952	Steel Town	
May 9, 1952	The Battle at Apache Pass	
May 24, 1952	Red Ball Express	
June 13, 1952	No Room for the Groom	
June 20, 1952	Scarlet Angel	
June 25, 1952	Has Anybody Seen My Gal?	
June 27, 1952	Just Across the Street	
June 1952	Appointment with Venus	U.S. distribution
July 11, 1952	Ma and Pa Kettle at the Fair	
July 15, 1952	White Corridors (Note: Owned by Cohen Media Group)	U.S. distribution
July 23, 1952	Untamed Frontier	
July 28, 1952	Lost in Alaska	
July 1952	Sally and Saint Anne	
July 1952	Francis Goes to West Point	
August 15, 1952	Son of Ali Baba	
September 2, 1952	It Grows on Trees	
September 5, 1952	The Duel at Silver Creek	
September 11, 1952	Bonzo Goes to College	
September 16, 1952	Yankee Buccaneer	
October 9, 1952	The World in His Arms	
October 11, 1952	Horizons West	
October 28, 1952	The Card	U.S. distribution
October 1952	Back at the Front	
November 20, 1952	The Raiders	
December 4, 1952	Because of You	
December 22, 1952	The Importance of Being Earnest	U.S. distribution
December 24, 1952	Against All Flags	
December 25, 1952	The Black Castle	

== 1953 ==
Release date	Title	Notes
January 3, 1953	The Lawless Breed	
January 8, 1953	The Redhead from Wyoming	
January 13, 1953	The Mississippi Gambler	
January 15, 1953	Girls in the Night	
January 1953	Meet Me at the Fair	
March 20, 1953	Seminole	
April 6, 1953	Abbott and Costello Go to Mars	
April 20, 1953	Ma and Pa Kettle on Vacation	
April 21, 1953	City Beneath the Sea	
April 22, 1953	It Happens Every Thursday	
May 4, 1953	Gunsmoke	
May 8, 1953	Desert Legion	
May 13, 1953	Law and Order	
May 20, 1953	Column South	
May 20, 1953	Thunder Bay	Universal's first film with stereophonic sound
June 5, 1953	It Came from Outer Space	Universal's first 3D film
June 6, 1953	A Queen Is Crowned	U.S. distribution
June 10, 1953	Francis Covers the Big Town	
June 19, 1953	Take Me to Town	
June 25, 1953	All I Desire	
June 26, 1953	The Lone Hand	
July 17, 1953	The Great Sioux Uprising	
August 1, 1953	Abbott and Costello Meet Dr. Jekyll and Mr. Hyde	
August 1, 1953	Desperate Moment	U.S. distribution
August 19, 1953	The Cruel Sea	U.S. distribution
August 21, 1953	The Man from the Alamo	
August 26, 1953	Wings of the Hawk	3-D
September 1953	The Stand at Apache River	
September 23, 1953	East of Sumatra	
September 23, 1953	The Golden Blade	
October 7, 1953	The Veils of Bagdad	
October 10, 1953	Something Money Can't Buy	U.S. distribution
October 15, 1953	All American	
November 1953	Back to God's Country	
November 11, 1953	The Glass Web	3-D
December 2, 1953	Forbidden	
December 6, 1953	Walking My Baby Back Home	
December 21, 1953	Tumbleweed	

== 1954 ==
Release date	Title	Notes
January 6, 1954	War Arrow	
January 11, 1954	Both Sides of the Law	U.S. distribution
January 18, 1954	Border River	
February 10, 1954	Ride Clear of Diablo	
February 15, 1954	Genevieve	U.S. distribution
February 17, 1954	The Glenn Miller Story	
February 18, 1954	Taza, Son of Cochise	
March 5, 1954	Creature from the Black Lagoon	3D
March 10, 1954	Ma and Pa Kettle at Home	
March 30, 1954	Saskatchewan	
April 14, 1954	Rails Into Laramie	
April 17, 1954	Yankee Pasha	
April 21, 1954	Playgirl	
May 2, 1954	Fireman Save My Child	
June 1954	Black Horse Canyon	
June 1954	Drums Across the River	
June 22, 1954	Johnny Dark	
July 3, 1954	Tanganyika	
July 30, 1954	Francis Joins the WACS	
August 7, 1954	Magnificent Obsession	
August 30, 1954	The Maggie	U.S. distribution
September 1, 1954	Dawn at Socorro	
September 2, 1954	The Black Shield of Falworth	
October 1, 1954	Naked Alibi	
November 1, 1954	Ricochet Romance	
November 6, 1954	Bengal Brigade	
November 16, 1954	The Yellow Mountain	
December 1, 1954	Destry	
December 12, 1954	Four Guns to the Border	
December 15, 1954	So This Is Paris	
December 18, 1954	Sign of the Pagan	

== 1955 ==
Release date	Title	Notes
January 21, 1955	Six Bridges to Cross	
February 2, 1955	Abbott and Costello Meet the Keystone Kops	
February 12, 1955	The Far Country	
March 24, 1955	Man Without a Star	
March 26, 1955	Captain Lightfoot	
March 1955	Smoke Signal	
April 12, 1955	The Man from Bitter Ridge	
April 1955	Chief Crazy Horse	
April 1955	Ma and Pa Kettle at Waikiki	
May 2, 1955	The Seekers	U.S. distribution
May 13, 1955	Revenge of the Creature	
May 30, 1955	Cult of the Cobra	
May 1955	The Looters	
June 1, 1955	This Island Earth	
June 15, 1955	The Purple Mask	
June 16, 1955	The Shrike	
June 23, 1955	Abbott and Costello Meet the Mummy	
July 1, 1955	Ain't Misbehavin'	
August 2, 1955	The Private War of Major Benson	
August 19, 1955	Female on the Beach	
August 23, 1955	Foxfire	Filmed in 1954; last American film to be shot in three-strip Technicolor
August 24, 1955	Francis in the Navy	
September 2, 1955	One Desire	
September 22, 1955	To Hell and Back	
September 23, 1955	Kiss of Fire	
October 24, 1955	The Second Greatest Sex	
November 1955	Hold Back Tomorrow	
November 2, 1955	The Naked Dawn	
November 2, 1955	Lady Godiva of Coventry	
November 23, 1955	Tarantula	
December 1, 1955	Running Wild	
December 23, 1955	The Spoilers	
December 25, 1955	All That Heaven Allows	
December 30, 1955	The Square Jungle	

== 1956 ==
Release date	Title	Notes
January 8, 1956	There's Always Tomorrow	
February 2, 1956	The Benny Goodman Story	
March 10, 1956	Never Say Goodbye	
March 13, 1956	The Price of Fear	
March 24, 1956	Raw Edge	
March 1956	World in My Corner	
March 1956	Red Sundown	
April 11, 1956	Backlash	
April 26, 1956	The Creature Walks Among Us	
April 1956	The Kettles in the Ozarks	
May 2, 1956	A Day of Fury	
June 1956	Outside the Law	
June 13, 1956	Star in the Dust	
June 29, 1956	The Toy Tiger	
July 1956	Edge of Hell	
July 1956	Congo Crossing	
July 1956	Behind the High Wall	
July 1, 1956	The Rawhide Years	
July 9, 1956	Francis in the Haunted House	
August 16, 1956	Away All Boats	Filmed in VistaVision
September 1956	I've Lived Before	
September 1956	Walk the Proud Land	
October 12, 1956	Pillars of the Sky	
October 26, 1956	The Brave One	Made for RKO Pictures
October 1956	Showdown at Abilene	
December 1, 1956	Everything but the Truth	
December 25, 1956	Written on the Wind	
December 27, 1956	The Unguarded Moment	
December 1956	Curucu, Beast of the Amazon	
December 1956	The Great Man	
December 1956	The Mole People	
December 1956	Rock, Pretty Baby	

== 1957 ==
Release date	Title	Notes
January 16, 1957	Four Girls in Town	
January 23, 1957	Istanbul	
February 1, 1957	The Young Stranger (Note: Owned by Warner Bros. (via Turner Entertainment Co.))	distribution only; co-production with Stuart Miller Productions; distributed by RKO Radio Pictures
February 14, 1957	Battle Hymn	
February 23, 1957	Mister Cory	co-production with Curtleigh Productions
March 6, 1957	Gun for a Coward	
March 14, 1957	The Tattered Dress	
April 2, 1957	The Night Runner	
April 4, 1957	Man Afraid	
April 10, 1957	Kelly and Me	
April 10, 1957	The Incredible Shrinking Man	
April 11, 1957	The Girl in the Kremlin	
May 10, 1957	The Kettles on Old MacDonald's Farm	
May 19, 1957	Public Pigeon No. 1	Made for RKO Pictures
May 26, 1957	The Deadly Mantis	
May 29, 1957	Joe Butterfly	
June 4, 1957	The Midnight Story	
June 14, 1957	Tammy and the Bachelor	plus Tammy sequels in 1961, 1963, and 1967
July 24, 1957	Night Passage	
July 28, 1957	Doctor at Large	U.S. distribution
August 13, 1957	Man of a Thousand Faces	
September 1, 1957	Slaughter on Tenth Avenue	
September 5, 1957	Run of the Arrow	distribution only; made for RKO Pictures
September 6, 1957	Quantez	
September 1957	That Night!	made for RKO Pictures
September 1957	Appointment with a Shadow	
October 1, 1957	Jet Pilot	made for RKO PIctures
October 18, 1957	My Man Godfrey	
October 27, 1957	Joe Dakota	
October 30, 1957	The Land Unknown	
October 30, 1957	Interlude	
October 1957	The Unholy Wife	distribution only; made for RKO Pictures
November 13, 1957	All Mine to Give	distribution only; made for RKO Pictures
November 27, 1957	The Violators	distribution only; made for RKO Pictures
November 1957	Slim Carter	
December 18, 1957	The Monolith Monsters	
December 23, 1957	Escapade in Japan	distribution only; made for RKO Pictures
December 1957	Love Slaves of the Amazons	

== 1958 ==
Release date	Title	Notes
January 11, 1958	The Tarnished Angels	
January 22, 1958	Man in the Shadow	
January 30, 1958	The Lady Takes a Flyer	
February 5, 1958	Day of the Badman	
February 1958	The Girl Most Likely	distribution only; made for RKO Pictures
February 1958	The Big Beat	
February 1958	Flood Tide	
March 1, 1958	Damn Citizen	
March 5, 1958	The Mark of the Hawk	U.S. distribution only
April 1958	Live Fast, Die Young	co-production with B.R.K. Inc.
April 1958	Girls on the Loose	co-production with Jewell Enterprises Inc.
April 23, 1958	Touch of Evil	
April 23, 1958	The Female Animal	
May 8, 1958	Horror of Dracula (Note: Owned by Warner Bros.)	U.S. distribution only; produced by Hammer Film Productions
May 14, 1958	I Married a Woman	distribution only; made for RKO Pictures
June 18, 1958	This Happy Feeling	
June 25, 1958	Summer Love	
June 27, 1958	The Thing That Couldn't Die	
July 4, 1958	A Time to Love and a Time to Die	
July 1958	The Last of the Fast Guns	
August 6, 1958	Twilight for the Gods	
August 13, 1958	Voice in the Mirror	
August 1958	Wild Heritage	
September 19, 1958	Raw Wind in Eden	
September 24, 1958	Kathy O'	
September 1958	Step Down to Terror	
September 1958	Once Upon a Horse...	
October 1958	Blood of the Vampire (Note: Owned by Shout! Studios)	U.S. distribution only; production by Artistes Alliance Ltd.
October 1958	Money, Women and Guns	
October 1, 1958	The Saga of Hemp Brown	
November 23, 1958	Ride a Crooked Trail	
November 30, 1958	The Perfect Furlough	Nominee of the Golden Globe Award for Best Motion Picture – Comedy.
December 17, 1958	Monster on the Campus	
December 1958	The Restless Years	

== 1959 ==
Release date	Title	Notes
1959	The Race for Space	
February 11, 1959	Never Steal Anything Small	
February 1959	No Name on the Bullet	
March 3, 1959	A Stranger in My Arms	
March 18, 1959	Imitation of Life	
May 27, 1959	The Wild and the Innocent	
May 1959	Curse of the Undead	
June 1959	Born to Be Loved	distribution only; production by Hugo Haas Productions
July 8, 1959	This Earth Is Mine	co-production with Vintage Productions
October 2, 1959	The Silent Enemy	U.S. distribution
October 7, 1959	Pillow Talk	distribution only; production by Arwin Productions; Nominee of the Golden Globe Award for Best Motion Picture – Comedy.
October 7, 1959	4D Man (Note: Owned by Worldwide Entertainment Corporation)	distribution only; production by Fairview Productions and Jack H. Harris Enterprises
November 20, 1959	The Snow Queen	English dub, U.S. distribution only
December 5, 1959	Operation Petticoat (Note: Owned by Paramount Pictures (via Melange Pictures))	distribution only; production by Granart Company; Nominee of the Golden Globe Award for Best Motion Picture – Comedy
December 16, 1959	The Mummy	U.S. distribution only; co-production with Hammer Film Productions

== See also ==
- List of Focus Features films
- List of Universal Pictures theatrical animated feature films
- Universal Pictures
- Category:Lists of films by studio
