= Frank X. Shaw =

American assistant director

- Born: Francis X. Shaw; September 15, 1895; New York, U.S.
- Died: June 12, 1962 (aged 66); Los Angeles, California, U.S.
- Occupation: Assistant director
- Relatives: Sam Shaw (grandson)

Francis X. Shaw (September 15, 1895 – June 12, 1962) was an American assistant director. He was nominated for an Academy Award in the category Best Assistant Director.

== Selected filmography ==
- Slightly Used (1927)
- Sailor Izzy Murphy (1927)
- The Girl from Chicago (1927)
- Pay as You Enter (1928)
- The Lion and the Mouse (1928)
- State Street Sadie (1928) - (uncredited)
- The Singing Fool (1928)
- Stark Mad (1929)
- Honky Tonk (1929) - (uncredited)
- Night Nurse (1931) - (uncredited)
- The Star Witness (1931) - (uncredited)
- Carnival Boat (1932) - (uncredited)
- State's Attorney (1932) - (uncredited)
- White Eagle (1932) - (uncredited)
- 20,000 Years in Sing Sing (1932) - (uncredited)
- Mystery of the Wax Museum (1933) - (uncredited)
- The Keyhole (1933) - (uncredited)
- The Mayor of Hell (1933) - (uncredited)
- Captured! (1933) - (uncredited)
- I Loved a Woman (1933) - (uncredited)
- Ever in My Heart (1933) - (uncredited)
- Convention City (1933)
- Mandalay (1934) - (uncredited)
- Gambling Lady (1934) - (uncredited)
- A Lost Lady (1934) - (uncredited)
- The Petrified Forest (1936) - (uncredited)
- The Story of Louis Pasteur (1936) - (uncredited)
- I Married a Doctor (1936) - (uncredited)
- The White Angel (1936) - (uncredited)
- The Captain's Kid (1936) - (uncredited)
- Three Smart Girls (1936)
- Girl Overboard (1937)
- The Great O'Malley (1937) - (uncredited)
- Wings over Honolulu (1937)
- One Hundred Men and a Girl (1937)
- Mad About Music (1938)
- The Rage of Paris (1938)
- Youth Takes a Fling (1938)
- Exposed (1938)
- Newsboys' Home (1938) - (uncredited)
- Three Smart Girls Grow Up (1938)
- The Forgotten Woman (1939) - (uncredited)
- First Love (1939)
- It's a Date (1940)
- Spring Parade (1940)
- Temptation (1946)
- The Egg and I (1947)
- Something in the Wind (1947)
- A Double Life (1947)
- All My Sons (1948)
- The Saxon Charm (1948)
- Family Honeymoon (1949)
- The Lady Gambles (1949)
- Sword in the Desert (1949) - (uncredited)
- Woman in Hiding (1950)
- One Way Street (1950) - (uncredited)
- Spy Hunt (1950)
- Mystery Submarine (1950)
- Harvey (1950) - (uncredited)
- Up Front (1951) - (uncredited)
- The Golden Horde (1951) - (uncredited)
- The Raging Tide (1951) - (uncredited)
- Flame of Araby (1951) - (uncredited)
- Meet Danny Wilson (1952)
- The World in His Arms (1952) - (uncredited)
- Sally and Saint Anne (1952)
- Because of You (1952)
- Girls in the Night (1953)
- Desert Legion (1953)
- War Arrow (1953)
- Border River (1954)
- Saskatchewan (1954)
- Playgirl (1954)
- Tanganyika (1954)
- Bengal Brigade (1954)
- Destry (1954)
- Man Without a Star (1955)
- Ain't Misbehavin' (1955)
- Lady Godiva of Coventry (1955)
- Tarantula! (1955)
- The Spoilers (1955)
- The Square Jungle (1955)
- Never Say Goodbye (1956)
- Star in the Dust (1956) - (uncredited)
- The Toy Tiger (1956)
- Congo Crossing (1956)
- I've Lived Before (1956)
- Everything But the Truth (1956)
- Kelly and Me (1956)
- Man Afraid (1957)
- My Man Godfrey (1957)
- Joe Dakota (1957)
- This Happy Feeling (1958)
- Once Upon a Horse... (1958)
- Kathy O' (1958)
- The Perfect Furlough (1958)
- Imitation of Life (1959)
- The Wild and the Innocent (1959)
- Operation Petticoat (1959)
