= Vacation Playhouse =

- Created by: Richard Michaels
- Directed by: Hy Averback; Richard Crenna; Jack Donohue; Claudio Guzmán; Jerry Hopper; Fletcher Markle; Norman Z. McLeod; Gene Reynolds; Barry Shear; Don Taylor; Richard Whorf; Don Weis
- Composer: Jerry Fielding
- Country of origin: United States
- Original language: English
- No. of seasons: 5
- No. of episodes: 47

Production
- Executive producers: Warren Lewis; William Dozier
- Producers: Hal Kanter; Arthur Julian; Jack Donohue; Stanley Shpetner; Edward H. Feldman; Jim McGinn
- Production locations: Desilu Studios; CBS Television City
- Editors: Bill Heath; Robert L. Swanson
- Running time: 30 minutes
- Production companies: Bing Crosby Productions; Desilu Productions; Four Star Television; Universal Television

Original release
- Network: CBS
- Release: July 22, 1963 – August 28, 1967

Vacation Playhouse is an American anthology television series that was broadcast on CBS during the summer months from 1963 through 1967.

== Background ==
The practice of television executives of ordering dozens of pilots for proposed television series each year – far more than their networks could possibly broadcast as series – created a sizable body of unsold pilots that had never aired. Packaging these unsold pilots in anthology series and airing them during the summer provided television networks with a way of both providing fresh programming during the summer rerun season and recouping at least some of the expense of producing them. Vacation Playhouse was one such series, aired by CBS each summer from 1963 through 1967.

== Production ==
Vacation Playhouse premiered on July 22, 1963, airing as a summer replacement for the situation comedy The Lucy Show; a voiceover introduced each episode with "While Lucy's on vacation . . . it's Vacation Playhouse." In 1963, it consisted of unsold pilots for situation comedies. When it returned in 1964, again replacing The Lucy Show, it mostly aired previously unseen situation comedy pilots, but also included the pilot for a musical-comedy variety show and repeats of comedic episodes of General Electric Theater. In 1965, it replaced Gomer Pyle, U.S.M.C., and that summer it aired dramatic adventure and mystery episodes in addition to situation comedies. It again replaced The Lucy Show in 1966 and 1967 and returned to its earlier format of presenting situation comedy pilots, during each of those summers consisting of previously unaired pilots and repeats of episodes that it had aired in previous years.

Among episode directors were Richard Crenna, Jack Donohue, Don Taylor,, and Bud Yorkin. Producers included Donohue, Hal Kanter, Arthur Julian, and Norman Lear. Other directors included Bud Yorkin. Studios involved in the production of pilots aired on Vacation Playhouse included Bing Crosby Productions, Desilu Productions, Desilu Studios, Filmways, Four Star Television, Television City, and Universal Television. Stars appearing in episodes of the series included Eve Arden, Orson Bean, Richard Benjamin, Charles Bronson, Edgar Buchanan, Wally Cox, James Franciscus, Ethel Merman, Barry Nelson, Suzanne Pleshette, Ginger Rogers, Soupy Sales, Brenda Vaccaro, Jerry Van Dyke, and Ed Wynn.

Two episodes of Vacation Playhouse aired twice on the series, two others aired three times, and the series also included a few repeats of episodes of other anthology series. Nonetheless, by the time Vacation Playhouse aired for the last time in August 1967, it had broadcast 47 unsold pilots since its 1963 premiere. Its five-season run made it the longest-lived series of unsold television pilots.

== Broadcast history ==
During 1963, Vacation Playhouse aired on Mondays from 8:30 to 9:00 p.m. Eastern Time, premiering on July 22 and concluding on September 23. It returned in the summer of 1964 in the same time slot, running from June 15 to September 14. During its third season in 1965, the series moved to Friday nights from 9:30 to 10:00 pm. Eastern Time from June 25 to September 10. It returned to its previous time slot on Monday nights in 1966, airing from July 4 and September 5, as well as for a final run in the summer of 1967 which began on July 3. Its final episode was broadcast on August 28, 1967.

== Episodes ==
Season	Episodes	Season premiere	Season finale
1	10	July 22, 1963	September 23, 1963
2	11	June 15, 1964	September 14, 1964
3	12	June 25, 1965	September 10, 1965
4	9	July 4, 1966	September 5, 1966
5	9	July 3, 1967	August 28, 1967

Season 4's nine episodes included two repeats of previously aired episodes. Season 5's nine episodes included four repeats of previously aired episodes.

=== Season 1 (1963) ===
No. in season	Title	Directed by	Written by	Original release date
1	"A Love Affair Just for Three"	Norman Z. McLeod	Valentine Davies & Norman Z. McLeod	July 22, 1963
A suitor falls for identical twin sisters – one an artist, the other a fashion designer – who help each other in times of need during their many misadventures. Starring Ginger Rogers (playing both sisters), Charles Ruggles, Cesare Danova, Warren Parker, Eugene Chan, Maureen Leeds, and Gardner McKay. Unsold pilot for The Ginger Rogers Show.
2	"Three Wishes"	Unknown	Unknown	July 29, 1963
A pretty young woman finds herself in possession of a magic lamp that has transported a 1,000-year-old genie to the present. Starring Diane Jergens, Gustavo Rojo, Wallace Ford, and George Grizzard.
3	"Hide and Seek"	Unknown	Unknown	August 5, 1963
A mystery writer can be scatterbrained, but she has an ineffable sense of logic, and she works together with her husband, a successful criminal defense attorney, to solve crimes. Starring Glynis Johns, Keith Andes, Michael Constantine, Mary Gregory, and Phyllis Love. This episode was the pilot for the proposed television series The Glynis Johns Show, which, after some cast changes, aired as the series Glynis during the 1962–1963 television season.
4	"Mickey and the Contessa"	Unknown	Unknown	August 12, 1963
An American football coach acquires a Hungarian countess as his housekeeper. Starring Mickey Shaughnessy and Eva Gabor.
5	"The Big Brain"	Unknown	Unknown	August 19, 1963
A bumbling inventor accidentally invents a machine that forces people to tell the truth. Starring Frank Aletter.
6	"Swingin' Together"	Gene Reynolds	Howard Leeds	August 26, 1963
A rock band seeking its big break that travels around the United States on an old bus driven by its manager secures a booking at a country club benefit, but the benefit's organizer objects to their style of music and orders them off the stage. After their manager threatens a lawsuit, the organizer's father apologizes and the band resumes playing and eventually wins over the organizer to their music. Starring Bobby Rydell, James Dunn, Ben Bryant, Larry Merrill, Peter Brooks, Art Metrano, Stefanie Powers, Lloyd Corrigan, and Frank Cady, with singing appearances by Dennis Crosby, Lindsay Crosby, and Phillip Crosby.
7	"All About Barbara"	Unknown	Unknown	September 2, 1963
A famous singer and musical comedy star gives up her career to marry a small-town college professor. Starring Barbara Nichols.
8	"Hooray for Love"	Unknown	Unknown	September 9, 1963
A young couple that live on a houseboat and drive a motorcycle face a threat to their marriage when the husband must choose between working for his wealthy father-in-law or staying in college. Starring Beverly Wills.
9	"Come a-Runnin'"	Unknown	Unknown	September 16, 1963
A small-town physician who has many heartwarming adventures and rarely is paid with money for his services faces a challenge when a couple prefers to use a midwife to deliver their first baby.
10	"Maggie Brown"	Unknown	Unknown	September 23, 1963
A woman who owns a nightclub in the South Pacific patronized by sailors must keep 3,000 of them away from her daughter – and then is forced to make her own beer when her club is declared off limits. Starring Ethel Merman.

=== Season 2 (1964) ===
No. in season	Title	Directed by	Written by	Original release date
1	"Hey, Teacher"	Unknown	Unknown	June 15, 1964
On his hectic first day on the job as the only male member of the teaching staff of an elementary school, a third-grade teacher enlists the aid of the school's jokester janitor to deal with a snake that has gotten loose while the rest of the school's staff makes bets on how many hours he will last in the job. Starring Dwayne Hickman.
2	"Hooray for Hollywood"	Unknown	Unknown	June 22, 1964
In 1920s Hollywood, a temperamental actress who is the top box-office attraction threatens to quit after arguing with a movie mogul, prompting two movie studios to fight over her. Starring Herschel Bernardi.
3	"Papa G.I."	Unknown	Unknown	June 29, 1964
A dancing United States Army sergeant stationed in South Korea has his hands full with two orphans who want him to adopt them. Starring Dan Dailey and Cherylene Lee.
4	"I and Claudie"	Unknown	Unknown	July 6, 1964
A pair of traveling buddies whose only possession is a ramshackle makeshift trailer devise creative schemes to make a living. Starring Ross Martin and Jerry Lanning.
5	"He's All Yours"	Unknown	Unknown	July 20, 1964
An American woman who moves to London with her daughter to manage a travel agency for a wealthy tycoon is forced to work with the owner's inept nephew – a crazy Englishman who turns the office into a madhouse with wild promotions he dreams up. Starring Eve Arden, Cindy Carol, Derek Bond, Jeremy Lloyd, Roger Avon, Katy Greenwood, Nicholas Parsons, Ambrosine Phillpotts, Howard Smith, and Pauline Chamberlain.
6	"Love is a Lion's Roar"	Unknown	Unknown	July 27, 1964
A French dancer is determined to marry a handsome New York City millionaire bachelor who is equally determined not to get married. Starring James Franciscus and Suzanne Pleshette. A repeat of an episode of General Electric Theater that originally aired on March 19, 1961, it was a pilot for the proposed situation comedy Band of Gold.
7	"At Your Service"	Unknown	Cynthia Lindsay	August 3, 1964
An American tries to open a tourist service in Paris. Starring Van Johnson, Jan Sterling, Marcel Dalio, and Judi Meredith.
8	"The Graduation Dress"	Richard Young	William R. Cox & William Faulkner	August 10, 1964
When a slick and lecherous city boy who works as a traveling photographer takes his camera into a rural area in the Tennessee hills to photograph a high school graduation, a beautiful country girl in need of a graduation dress captivates him, and he stirs up excitement when he tries to trade a dress for some favors. Starring Hugh O'Brian, Stella Stevens, Ellen Corby, Buddy Ebsen, Tommy Nolan, and Suzanne Sydney. A repeat of an episode which aired originally on General Electric Theater on October 30, 1960.
9	"The First Hundred Years"	Unknown	Unknown	August 17, 1964
A young couple raises a baby while trying to finish college. Starring Nick Adams, Joyce Bulifant, and Roger Perry.
10	"My Darling Judge"	Unknown	Unknown	August 31, 1964
A judge tries to get away from his duties temporarily and overcome family obstacles so he can enjoy a fishing trip. Starring Fred Clark and Audrey Totter.
11	"The Bean Show"	Unknown	Unknown	September 7, 1964
A variety show starring Orson Bean, featuring improvisational comedy sketches by the comedy troupe The Beanbaggers (made up of Avery Schreiber, Mina Kolb, Dick Shael, and Arlene Golonka), and musical performances by the Serendipity Singers.
12	"The Ivy League"	Unknown	Unknown	September 14, 1964
After his discharge from the military, a former United States Marine Corps sergeant enrolls as a college freshman. Starring William Bendix and Tim Hovey.

=== Season 3 (1965) ===
No. in season	Title	Directed by	Written by	Original release date
1	"Sybil"	Hy Averback	Jerry Davis, Jim Fritzell & Everett Greenbaum	June 25, 1965
As punishment for her vanity, a young wood nymph is banished from her native habitat and sent to reside on Earth until she does 100 good deeds. Starring Suzy Parker.
2	"Alec Tate"	Richard Kinon	Edmund Beloin & Henry Garson	July 2, 1965
The teenage sister of a bachelor who owns an apartment house arranges for him to meet an eligible young woman.
3	"The Barbara Rush Show"	Unknown	Unknown	July 9, 1965
A housewife takes a job as a public stenographer to support her medical-student husband and three children. Starring Barbara Rush.
4	"Patrick Stone"	Unknown	Unknown	July 16, 1965
An unusual request leads a private investigator into a series of complicated situations. Starring Keenan Wynn and Joanna Barnes.
5	"Starr, First Baseman"	Unknown	Unknown	July 23, 1965
Alternative titles "Starr" and "Starr of the Yankees." A rookie baseball player has an accident that almost ends his career before it can begin. Starring Martin Milner.
6	"The Brave Duke"	Unknown	Unknown	July 30, 1965
In 1870, an expatriate American who operates a casino in Mexico becomes involved in a gun-smuggling plot by Mexican revolutionaries. Starring Gerald Mohr.
7	"Luke and the Tenderfoot, Part I"	Unknown	Unknown	August 6, 1965
In the Old West, a traveling salesman and his inexperienced partner ride into a town being terrorized by a fearsome gunfighter. Starring Edgar Buchanan, Carleton Carpenter, and Charles Bronson.
8	"Luke and the Tenderfoot, Part II"	Unknown	Unknown	August 13, 1965
The conclusion of the story of a traveling salesman and his inexperienced partner who work together to stop a fearsome gunfighter in the Old West. Starring Edgar Buchanan, Carleton Carpenter, and Charles Bronson.
9	"Coogan's Reward"	Don Taylor	Story: Richard Donovan* Teleplay:Peggy Chantler Dick, William Cowley, & David Swift	August 20, 1965
An arrogant, conniving, and philandering war correspondent covering World War II in France prefers a hedonistic lifestyle to actually doing his job, so he never visits the front for his stories, preferring to enjoy life behind the lines and piece together phony stories from bits of information he gathers from other reporters. Starring Tony Randall, Jerry Barclay, Roxane Berard, Alan Carney, Alan Dexter, Robert Gist, Chet Stratton, and Jason Wingreen. A repeat of an episode of General Electric Theater that originally aired on January 5, 1959.
10	"Three on an Island"	Vincent Sherman	Hal Kanter	August 27, 1965
Three young single women help a boxer who cannot fight. Starring Pamela Tiffin, Julie Newmar, Monica Moran, and Jody McCrea.
11	"Cap'n Ahab"	Unknown	Unknown	September 3, 1965
At the reading of a will, two women who are distant cousins learn that they will inherit money, a townhouse in New York City, and a conniving 97-year-old parrot named Cap'n Ahab, but to qualify for the inheritance, they must live together and care for Cap'n Ahab. Starring Judy Canova and Jaye P. Morgan.
12	"Down Home"	Hal Kanter	Milt Josefsberg	September 10, 1965
After a soldier is discharged from the United States Army and returns to his home town to become the editor of a newspaper his aunt has inherited, the folksy humor in his writing so angers the town's banker that he tries to put the newspaper out of business. Starring Pat Buttram, El Brendel, Sara Haden, Jack Orrison, John Hale, and Mary Jane Saunders.

=== Season 4 (1966) ===
No. in season	Title	Directed by	Written by	Original release date
1	"Hey, Teacher"	Unknown	Unknown	July 4, 1966
On his hectic first day on the job as the only male member of the teaching staff of an elementary school, a third-grade teacher enlists the aid of the school's jokester janitor to deal with a snake that has gotten loose while the rest of the school's staff makes bets on how many hours he will last in the job. Starring Dwayne Hickman. A repeat of the episode previously aired on June 15, 1964.
2	"The Good Old Days"	Unknown	Unknown	July 11, 1966
In prehistoric times, a young caveman leaves home to live on his own and find adventure. Starring Darryl Hickman.
3	"Maggie Brown"	Unknown	Unknown	July 18, 1966
A woman who owns a nightclub in the South Pacific patronized by sailors must keep 3,000 of them away from her daughter – and then is forced to make her own beer when her club is declared off limits. Starring Ethel Merman. A repeat of the episode previously aired on September 23, 1963.
4	"Frank Merriwell"	Unknown	Unknown	July 25, 1966
The adventures of all-American hero Frank Merriwell, a Yale University student at the turn of the 20th century who excels at sports, solves mysteries, and rights wrongs. Starring Jeff Cooper and Tisha Sterling. Based on the character created by Gilbert Patten.
5	"Where There's Smokey"	Unknown	Unknown	August 1, 1966
A small-town fire chief's brother-in-law is an eager but ineffectual fireman who shares a home with the chief and the chief's wife, although the chief always is trying to get him move out of the house. The chief has a perfect record of fire safety and control until his brother-in-law unconsciously – but steadily – undermines the fire department′s operations. Starring Soupy Sales, Gale Gordon, and Jack Weston.
6	"My Lucky Penny"	Don Richardson	Unknown	August 8, 1966
Two couples spend a hectic two days guarding $15,000 in cash. Starring Richard Benjamin and Brenda Vaccaro.
7	"The Hoofer"	Unknown	Unknown	August 15, 1966
A pair of no-talent vaudeville performers searching for a great gig try a series of tricks to get a top agent and impresario in a Chicago hospital to see their act. Starring Donald O'Connor, Soupy Sales, and Jerome Cowan. Unsold pilot for The Donald O'Connor Show.
8	"My Son, the Doctor"	Unknown	Unknown	August 22, 1966
A struggling young pediatrician faces challenges.
9	"The Two of Us"	Unknown	Unknown	August 29, 1966
A young widow works as an illustrator, and her impressionable 7-year-old son imagines her drawings coming to life, preferring the world of fantasy he creates to making real friends. Starring Patricia Crowley and Bill Mumy.
9	"Off We Go!"	Unknown	Unknown	September 5, 1966
Eager to join the war effort during World War II, a 16-year-old boy who looks older than he is joins the United States Army Air Forces and quickly rises to the rank of colonel. Placed in command of a small air base in England, he deals with his commanding general while he and his squadron carry out their missions. Starring Michael Burns and Dick Foran.

=== Season 5 (1967) ===
No. in season	Title	Directed by	Written by	Original release date
1	"You're Only Young Twice"	Unknown	Unknown	July 3, 1967
A sweet old college professor invents a rejuvenation pill that makes anyone who takes it look 10 years younger, but only for a short time. He lets a pretty housewife try it, leading to an encounter with her errant husband in a nightclub and a teenage beach party at Malibu, California. Starring Ed Wynn in a posthumous role and Ethel Waters.
2	"Maggie Brown"	Unknown	Unknown	July 10, 1967
A woman who owns a nightclub in the South Pacific patronized by sailors must keep 3,000 of them away from her daughter – and then is forced to make her own beer when her club is declared off limits. Starring Ethel Merman. A repeat of the episode aired twice previously, on September 23, 1963, and July 18, 1966.
3	"My Lucky Penny"	Unknown	Unknown	July 17, 1967
Two couples spend a hectic two days guarding $15,000 in cash. Starring Richard Benjamin and Brenda Vaccaro. A repeat of the episode previously aired on August 8, 1966.
4	"My Boy Goggle"	Ralph Levy	Bill Manhoff	July 24, 1967
A father must deal with his son's behavior at school after the boy is accused of biting his music teacher. Starring Jerry Van Dyke, Teddy Eccles, Jeanne Rainier, Pamela Dapo, Alice Pearce, Lee Goodman, and Frances Robinson. Filmed in 1964. Based on the novel This is Goggle, or the Education of a Father by Bentz Plagemann.
5	"Alfred of the Amazon"	Unknown	Unknown	July 31, 1967
A bumbling young man who owns a rubber plantation in South America and fights injustice as a jungle adventurer in his spare time sets off into the Amazon rainforest to rescue a dentist and a nurse – who also is the dentist's beautiful daughter – from headhunters who are holding them captive. Starring Wally Cox.
6	"The Two of Us"	Unknown	Unknown	August 7, 1967
A young widow works as an illustrator, and her impressionable 7-year-old son imagines her drawings coming to life, preferring the world of fantasy he creates to making real friends. Starring Patricia Crowley and Bill Mumy. A repeat of an episode previously aired on August 29, 1966.
7	"Heaven Help Us"	Unknown	Unknown	August 14, 1967
After the spirit of his late wife returns to help him find a new mate, a magazine editor ends up with two dates on the same night. Starring Barry Nelson and Joanna Moore.
8	"The Jones Boys"	Unknown	Unknown	August 21, 1967
A man leads a boisterous team of maintenance men. Starring Mickey Shaughnessy.
9	"Hey, Teacher"	Unknown	Unknown	August 28, 1967
On his hectic first day on the job as the only male member of the teaching staff of an elementary school, a third-grade teacher enlists the aid of the school's jokester janitor to deal with a snake that has gotten loose while the rest of the school's staff makes bets on how many hours he will last in the job. Starring Dwayne Hickman. A repeat of an episode aired twice previously, on June 15, 1964 and July 4, 1966.
