= Sherman Todd =

American film editor and producer

- Born: April 1, 1904; Buffalo, Wyoming, U.S.
- Died: June 10, 1979 (aged 75); Laguna Beach, California, U.S.
- Occupations: Film editor, producer
- Spouse: Win Todd
- Children: 2

Sherman Todd (April 1, 1904 - June 10, 1979) was an American film editor and producer. He was nominated for two Academy Awards in the category Best Film Editing for the films The Long Voyage Home and For Whom the Bell Tolls.

Todd died in June 1979 in Laguna Beach, California, at the age of 75.

== Selected filmography ==
Sherman Todd began his career as an editor. Based on Todd's filmography at the Internet Movie Database.

With more than 30 film credits dating from 1931, his film editing work includes:

Editor
Year	Film	Director	Notes	Other notes
1931	Palmy Days	A. Edward Sutherland		
1933	Roman Scandals	Frank Tuttle		Uncredited
1935	Folies Bergère de Paris	Roy Del Ruth	First collaboration with Roy Del Ruth	
1935	Cardinal Richelieu	Rowland V. Lee		
1935	L'homme des Folies Bergère	Roy Del Ruth	Second collaboration with Roy Del Ruth	
1935	The Dark Angel	Sidney Franklin		
1936	Strike Me Pink	Norman Taurog		
1936	Beloved Enemy	H. C. Potter	First collaboration with H. C. Potter	
1937	Stella Dallas	King Vidor		
1938	The Goldwyn Follies	George Marshall		
1938	The Cowboy and the Lady	H. C. Potter	Second collaboration with H. C. Potter	
1939	They Shall Have Music	Archie Mayo		
1939	Raffles	Sam Wood	First collaboration with Sam Wood	
1940	Our Town	Sam Wood	Second collaboration with Sam Wood	
1940	The Long Voyage Home	John Ford		
1941	The Devil and Miss Jones	Sam Wood	Third collaboration with Sam Wood	
1941	Look Who's Laughing	Allan Dwan		
1942	Joan of Paris	Robert Stevenson		
1943	For Whom the Bell Tolls	Sam Wood	Fourth collaboration with Sam Wood	
1947	Magic Town	William A. Wellman		
1948	Berlin Express	Jacques Tourneur		
1948	They Live by Night	Nicholas Ray	First collaboration with Nicholas Ray	
1949	A Woman's Secret	Nicholas Ray	Second collaboration with Nicholas Ray	
1950	Our Very Own	David Miller		
1950	The Sun Sets at Dawn	Paul Sloane		
1951	Flying Leathernecks	Nicholas Ray	Third collaboration with Nicholas Ray	
1951	The Racket	John Cromwell		
1956	Backlash	John Sturges		
1956	A Day of Fury	Harmon Jones		
1956	Congo Crossing	Joseph Pevney	First collaboration with Joseph Pevney	
1956	Walk the Proud Land	Jesse Hibbs		
1956	Everything but the Truth	Jerry Hopper		
1956	The Great Man	José Ferrer		
1957	Istanbul	Joseph Pevney	Second collaboration with Joseph Pevney	
1957	The Girl in the Kremlin	Russell Birdwell		
1957	Night Passage	James Neilson		
1957	The Lady Takes a Flyer	Jack Arnold		
1958	Day of the Badman	Harry Keller		

Editorial department
Year	Film	Director	Role
1947	Sinbad the Sailor	Richard Wallace	Editorial supervisor
1952	One Minute to Zero	Tay Garnett	Editorial supervisor

Director
Year	Film	Notes
1951	The Racket	Uncredited

Producer
Year	Film	Director	Credit
1943	The Sky's the Limit	Edward H. Griffith	Associate producer
1943	Tender Comrade	Edward Dmytryk	Associate producer
1944	None but the Lonely Heart	Clifford Odets	Associate producer

Second unit or assistant director
Year	Film	Director	Role
1946	From This Day Forward	John Berry	Second unit director

Documentaries

Editor
Year	Film	Director
1954	The Immortal City	Jerome Cappi

TV pilots

Editor
Year	Film	Director
1961	The Jane Powell Show	Rod Amateau
1963	Munroe	Stanley Z. Cherry

TV series

Editor
Year	Title	Notes
1952	Hopalong Cassidy	3 episodes
1952−53	My Hero	7 episodes
1954	Cavalcade of America	4 episodes
1955	Stage 7	9 episodes
1955	Four Star Playhouse	2 episodes
1955−56	The Star and the Story	13 episodes
1958	Colgate Theatre	1 episode
1959	Trackdown	1 episode
1959	Steve Canyon	1 episode
1959	Law of the Plainsman	1 episode
1959	Black Saddle	2 episodes
1959	The David Niven Show	2 episodes
1959	The Detectives	3 episodes
1958−59	Richard Diamond, Private Detective	2 episodes
1958−59	Wanted Dead or Alive	6 episodes
1959−60	Zane Grey Theatre	4 episodes
1959−60	The Rifleman	8 episodes
1959−60	Johnny Ringo	3 episodes
1959−60	The DuPont Show with June Allyson	5 episodes
1960	The Tom Ewell Show	1 episode
1960	The Westerner	2 episodes
1960−61	Dante	3 episodes
1960−61	Peter Loves Mary	2 episodes
1961	Stagecoach West	1 episode
1960−62	The Law and Mr. Jones	5 episodes
1961−62	The Dick Powell Show	2 episodes
1962−63	The Lloyd Bridges Show	3 episodes
1964	Summer Playhouse	1 episode
1963−65	Burke's Law	21 episodes
1964−65	The Rogues	2 episodes
1965	Honey West	1 episode
1965−69	The Big Valley	34 episodes

Editorial department
Year	Title	Role	Notes
1954	Cavalcade of America	Supervising editor	1 episode
1957−58	The Court of Last Resort	Supervising editor; Supervising film editor	8 episodes
