= Mike Road =

American actor (1918–2013)

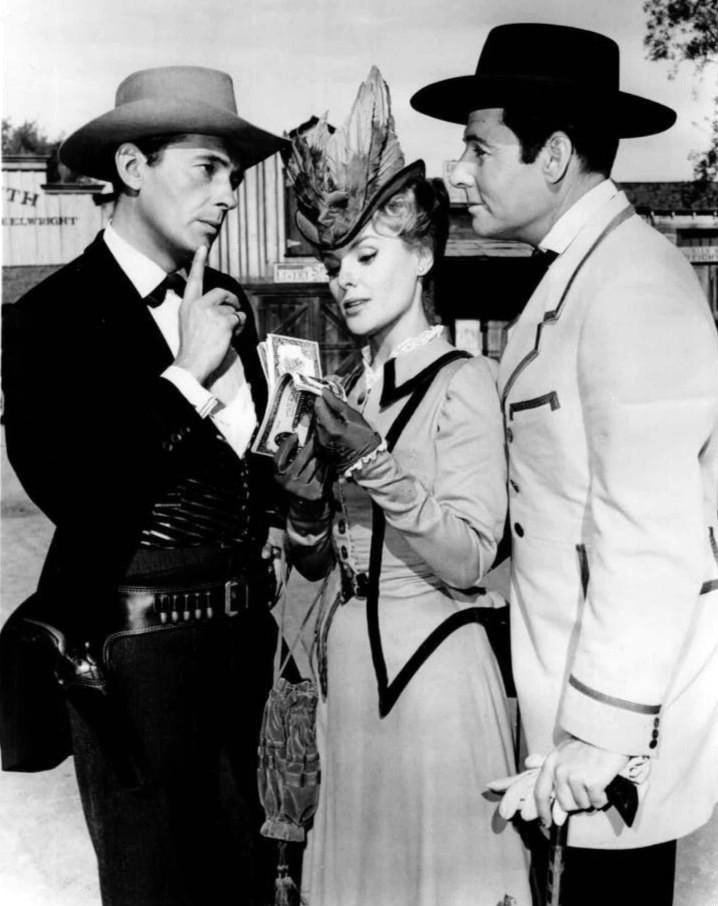
- Road (right) as Pearly Gates with Jack Kelly and Kathleen Crowley in Maverick (1962)
- Born: Milton Brustin; March 18, 1918; Malden, Massachusetts, U.S.
- Died: April 14, 2013 (aged 95); Los Angeles, California, U.S.
- Occupations: Actor and director
- Years active: 1939–1988
- Children: 2

Mike Road (born Milton Brustin; March 18, 1918 – April 14, 2013) was an American voice actor and Warner Bros. Television series contract player whose television career dates back to the 1950s and in films to the 1940s.

== Biography ==
Road was born Milton Brustin in Malden, Massachusetts, the son of Jewish parents Marion Portnoy and Benjamin Brustin. He got his start as an actor in school plays while in Malden High School, which led to him joining a theatre troupe in Boston. His Broadway debut came in the late 1930s in the short-lived play Doodle Dandy of the U.S.A. He supported himself by doing odd jobs such as usher, waiter, truck driver, delivery man and sign painter.

Road had a role in the play The Moonvine. His film career had also begun by this time. Between 1943 and 1946, he appeared in Gildersleeve on Broadway, Tender Comrade, Music in Manhattan, Heavenly Days and several other motion pictures. In 1946, he returned to the stage, playing the lead role in Dear Ruth. By 1952, Road had been elected director of The John Hancock Summer Theatre. In 1955, Road made his directorial debut in Sweden with the film The Magnificent Lie, starring Signe Hasso.

In the late 1950s, his television career also took off. He portrayed Marshal Tom Sellers on the 1958–59 NBC western series Buckskin, co-starring with Sally Brophy and Tom Nolan. Road guest starred twice on Maverick as Bart Maverick's rival Pearly Gates. He was also a regular on the ABC/Warner Brothers detective series Surfside 6, as well as on The Roaring 20s. He appeared in the series The Alaskans and Lawman, and in other venues: Sea Hunt, Gunsmoke (as “Ab Butler” in the S6E1 offering “Friend’s Pay Off”), The Patty Duke Show, I Dream of Jeannie, Bewitched, The Wild, Wild West ("The Night of the Tottering Tontine", S2E16, as Martin Dexter), and Alias Smith and Jones (episode: "Shootout at Diablo Station", 1971).

In his two appearances on the western series Colt .45, Road played Jesse James in "Alias Mr. Howard". He was also cast as a bandit-turned-storekeeper in the segment "Arizona Anderson", which aired on February 14, 1960.

As a voice actor, Road is best known as Race Bannon on Hanna-Barbera's Jonny Quest (1964–1965). During this time, he guest starred as Go-Go Ravine on The Flintstones episode "Fred Meets Hercurock". He was also the voice of Ugh the Giant Caveman on Space Ghost and Dino Boy (1966), Zandor on The Herculoids (1967), John Butler on Valley of the Dinosaurs (1974), and Reed Richards on The New Fantastic Four in 1978. He performed guest voices on The Funky Phantom (1971), Speed Buggy (1973) and Godzilla (1978). Road retired from voice acting after reprising his role as Zandor in Hanna-Barbera's Space Stars in 1981.

He returned to directing plays on the stage in the 1970s. In 1973, Road won the Los Angeles Drama Critics' Circle Award for Come Slowly Eden. He directed Toni Gerry in the drama one-woman play Hanna Speaks in 1988.

Mike Road died on April 14, 2013, at the age of 95 in Los Angeles.

== Voiceover roles ==
- Jonny Quest - Roger T. 'Race' Bannon / additional voices (1964–1965)
- The Flintstones - episode - "Fred Meets Hercurock" - Go-Go Ravine / Trainer / Guy #2 / Chauffeur (1965)
- Space Ghost and Dino Boy - Ugh (1966)
- Birdman and the Galaxy Trio (1967)
- The Herculoids - Zandor / Zok / Igoo / Tundro / additional voices (1967)
- The Funky Phantom (1971–1972)
- The ABC Saturday Superstar Movie - episode - "Gidget Makes the Wrong Connection" - Ralph Hightower / R.C. Man (1972)
- The New Scooby-Doo Movies - additional voices (1972)
- Sealab 2020 - Matthew Mills (1972)
- Josie and the Pussy Cats in Outer Space (1972)
- Valley of the Dinosaurs - John Butler (1974)
- Partridge Family 2200 AD (1974)
- The Last of the Mohicans - TV special - Hawkeye (1975)
- Captain Caveman and the Teen Angels - additional voices (1977–1980)
- The New Fantastic Four - Mister Fantastic / Reed Richards (1978)
- Godzilla - additional voices (1978–1979)
- Space Stars - Zandor, Tundro, Zok, Igoo, additional voices (1981)

== Television ==
- Buckskin - 34 episodes - Marshal Tom Sellers / Sheriff Tom Sellers (1958–1959)
- Wagon Train - episode - "The Martha Barham Story" - Capt. Wade Forrest (1959)
- Gunsmoke - episodes - "Friends Pay-Off" & "Big Man, Big Target" - Ab Butler & Joe Merchant (1960–1964)
- Maverick - episode - "Red Dog" - Buckskin Charlie King (1961)
- Cheyenne - episode - "The Quick and the Deadly" - Jud Ainley (1962)
- Maverick - episodes - "Dade City Dodge" & "The Troubled Heir" - Pearly Gates (1962)
- Bewitched - episodes - "My Friend Ben" & "Samantha for the Defense" - Chuck Hawkins (1966)
- I Dream of Jeannie - episode - "How Do You Beat Superman?" - Tony Millionaire (1966)
- The Wild Wild West -episode - "The Night of the Tottering Tontine" - Martin Dexter (1967)
- The New Adventures of Huckleberry Finn - additional voices (1968)
- McMillan & Wife - episode - "The Easy Sunday Murder Case" - Announcer at Dog Show (1971)
- Alias Smith and Jones - episodes - "A Fistful of Diamonds" & "Shootout at Diablo Station" - Sheriff Lom Trevors (1971)
- O'Hara, U.S. Treasury - - Russ Novack (1971)
- The Magical World of Disney - episodes - "Justin Morgan Had a Horse: Parts 1 & 2" - Dans Forth (1972)
- Police Woman - episode - "Father to the Man" - Rudy (1976)
