= Buckskin (TV series) =

- Genre: Western
- Written by: Charles Beaumont; Richard Matheson; Harold Swanton
- Directed by: Earl Bellamy; Abner Biberman; John Brahm; Edward Ludwig; Fletcher Markle
- Starring: Tom Nolan; Sally Brophy; Mike Road
- Theme music composer: Stanley Morton; Mort Green
- Composer: Stanley Wilson
- Country of origin: United States
- Original language: English
- No. of seasons: 1
- No. of episodes: 39

Production
- Producer: Robert Bassler
- Running time: 22–24 minutes
- Production companies: BetFord Corporation; Revue Productions

Original release
- Network: NBC
- Release: July 3, 1958 – May 25, 1959

Buckskin is an American Western television series starring Tom Nolan, Sally Brophy, and Mike Road. The series aired on the NBC network from July 3, 1958, until May 25, 1959, followed by summer reruns in 1959 and again in 1965.

== Synopsis ==
The show depicts life in fictitious Buckskin, Montana, in the 1880s, as seen through the eyes of 10-year-old Jody O'Connell, played by Nolan. Jody's widowed mother, Annie, played by Brophy, runs the town's boarding house. The lives of Jody and Annie interact with the townspeople and strangers passing through Buckskin. Another constant is Marshal Tom Sellers, played by Mike Road, who keeps the peace. Young Nolan narrates the series while on a corral fence and playing a harmonica.

== Cast ==
- Tom Nolan as Jody O'Connell
- Sally Brophy as Mrs. Annie O'Connell
- Mike Road as Marshal Tom Sellers
- Marjorie Bennett and Shirley Knight as Mrs. Newcomb
- Michael Lipton as Ben Newcomb
- Orville Sherman as Mr. Feeney

=== Notable guest stars ===
- Virginia Christine
- Andy Clyde
- Richard H. Cutting
- Jane Darwell
- Kathleen Freeman
- Robert Fuller
- Don Grady
- Michael Hinn
- Clegg Hoyt
- Ricky Kelman
- Roger Mobley
- Warren Oates
- Dennis Patrick
- Pernell Roberts
- Olive Sturgess
- Lyle Talbot
- Vic Tayback

== Episodes ==
No. in season	Title	Original release date
1	"The Lady from Blackhawk"	July 3, 1958
2	"The Man Who Waited"	July 10, 1958
3	"The Outlaw's Boy"	July 17, 1958
4	"The Ballad of Gabe Pruitt"	July 24, 1958
5	"The Trial of Chrissy Miller"	July 31, 1958
6	"Cash Robertson"	August 7, 1958
7	"Lament for Durango"	August 14, 1958
8	"Tree of Death"	August 21, 1958
9	"The Gold Watch"	August 28, 1958
10	"The Ghost of Balaclava"	September 4, 1958
11	"Hunter's Moon"	September 11, 1958
12	"China Boy"	September 18, 1958
13	"Tell Me, Leonardo"	September 25, 1958
14	"A Picture of Pa"	October 2, 1958
15	"The Money Man"	October 9, 1958
16	"Miss Pringle"	October 16, 1958
17	"A Permanent Juliet"	October 23, 1958
18	"A Man from the Mountains"	October 30, 1958
19	"The Bullnappers"	November 6, 1958
20	"The Greatest Man in History"	January 5, 1959
21	"The Monkey's Uncle"	January 12, 1959
22	"Mr. Rush's Secretary"	January 19, 1959
23	"Coup Stick"	February 2, 1959
24	"Fry's Wife"	February 9, 1959
25	"Who Killed Pat Devlin?"	February 16, 1959
26	"Little Heathen"	February 23, 1959
27	"The Knight Who Owned Buckskin"	March 2, 1959
28	"Cousin Casey"	March 9, 1959
29	"A Well of Gold"	March 16, 1959
30	"Act of Faith"	March 23, 1959
31	"The Venus Adjourner"	March 30, 1959
32	"Charlie, My Boy"	April 6, 1959
33	"Annie's Old Beau"	April 13, 1959
34	"Mail-Order Groom"	April 20, 1959
35	"The Manager"	April 27, 1959
36	"I'll Sing at Your Wedding"	May 4, 1959
37	"A Question of Courage"	May 11, 1959
38	"Mary MacNamara"	May 18, 1959
39	"The Better Mouse Trap"	May 25, 1959

== Production notes ==
The series first ran on Thursday evenings at 9:30 Eastern from July to September 1958 as a summer replacement for The Ford Show, Starring Tennessee Ernie Ford, Friday evenings at 7:30 from October 10, 1958, to January 1959, and Thursdays again at 7:30 from January to September 1959 (or Monday evenings at 7:30 from January to September 1959) The 1965 reruns were carried on Sundays at 8:30 pm. The Buckskin theme song was composed by Stanley Morton and Mort Green.

Sponsored by Ford automobiles, the show was produced by Tennessee Ernie Ford's company BetFord Corporation. It was Ernie's foray into production beyond The Ford Show.
