= Julie Adams =

American actress (1926–2019)

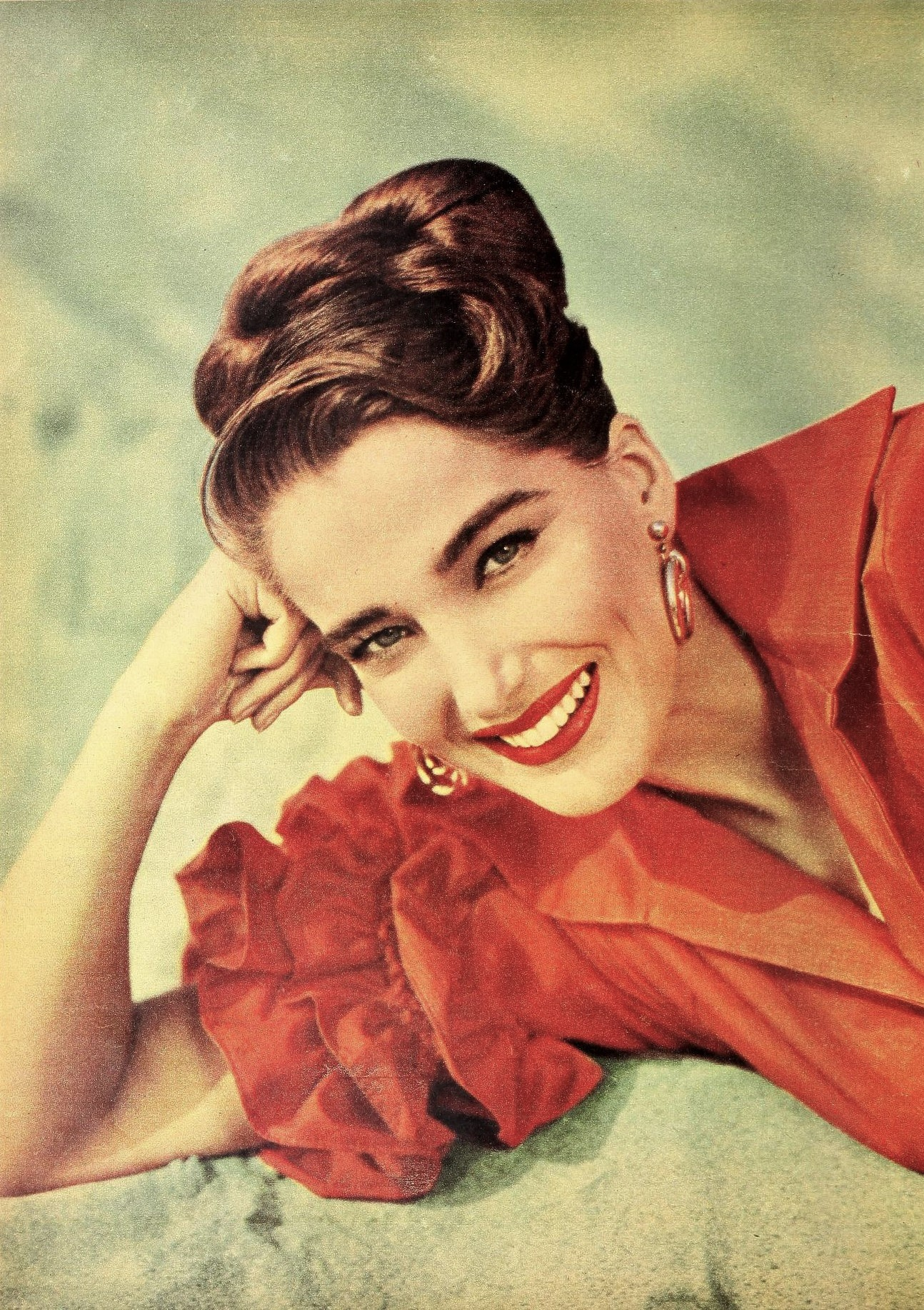
- Adams in 1953
- Born: Betty May Adams; October 17, 1926; Waterloo, Iowa, U.S.
- Died: February 3, 2019 (aged 92); Los Angeles, California, U.S.
- Other names: Betty Adams; Julia Adams
- Occupation: Actress
- Years active: 1946–2019
- Spouses: Leonard Stern (m. 1951; div. 1953) Ray Danton (m. 1954; div. 1981)
- Children: 2
- Website: julieadams.biz

Julie Adams (born Betty May Adams; October 17, 1926 – February 3, 2019) was an American actress, billed as Julia Adams in her early career, primarily known for her numerous television guest roles. She starred in a number of films in the 1950s, including Bend of the River (1952), opposite James Stewart; and Creature from the Black Lagoon (1954). Adams also had an extensive television career including roles as Paula Denning on the 1980s soap opera Capitol, and Eve Simpson on Murder, She Wrote.

== Early years ==
Julie Adams was born Betty May Adams on October 17, 1926, in Waterloo, Iowa, the daughter of Arkansas-born parents Esther Gertrude (Beckett) and cotton buyer Ralph Adams. She was an only child, and her parents were alcoholics. Her parents moved around a lot, with her father earning a living as a cotton buyer. Her father died when she was 15, and due to her mother's heavy drinking, Adams moved to Arkansas to live with her aunt and uncle in Blytheville, Arkansas. In 1946, at the age of 19, she was crowned "Miss Little Rock". Adams then moved to Hollywood, California, to pursue her acting career.

== Career ==
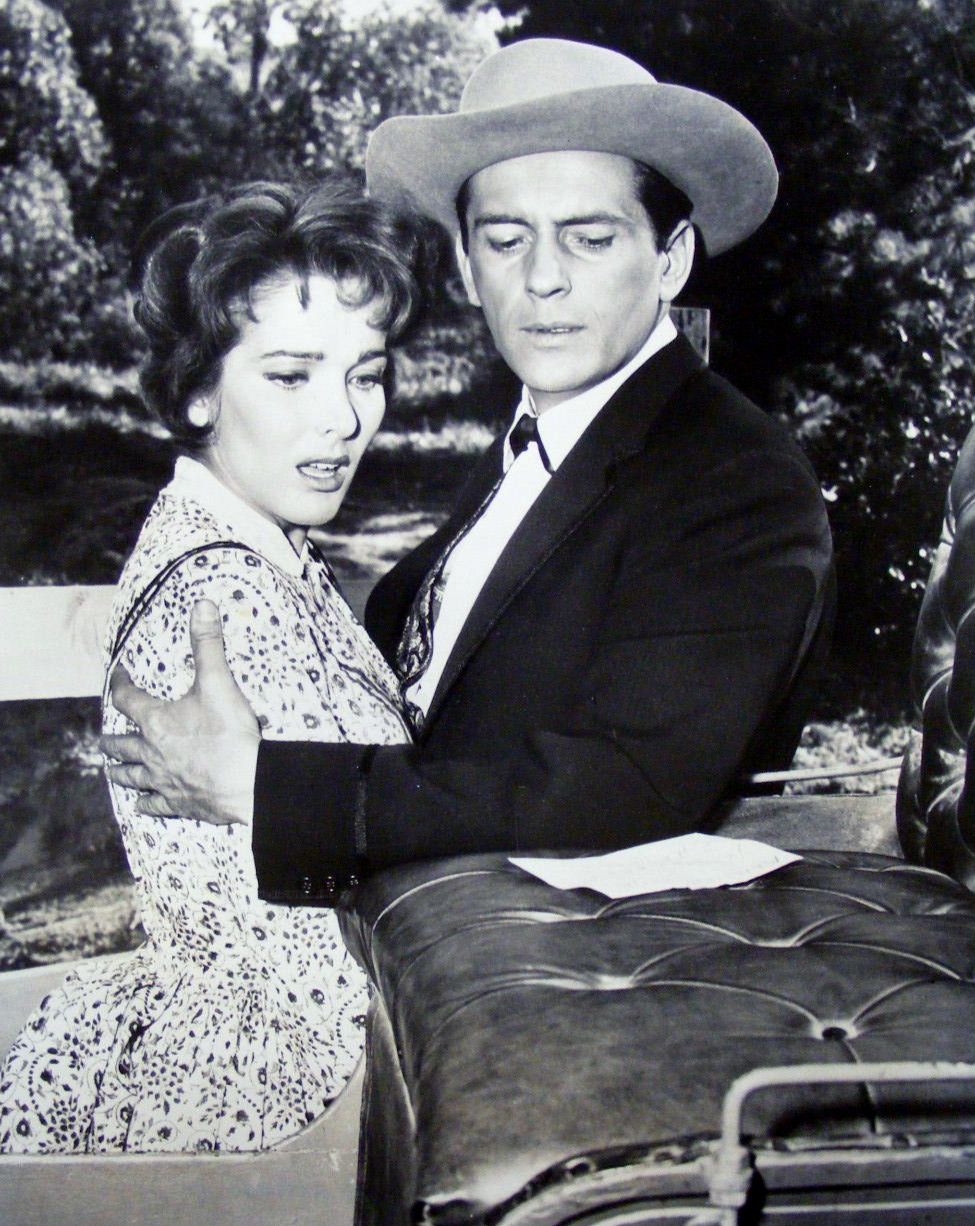
Adams and Jack Kelly in Maverick (1960)

=== Film ===
After moving to Hollywood, Adams worked as a part-time secretary and spent time taking speech lessons to lose her accent. Working under her real name, Betty Adams, she landed a role in Red, Hot and Blue (1949). Then, she landed a leading role in the Lippert Western The Dalton Gang (1949). B-movie stardom followed quickly when the producers of The Dalton Gang asked if she would star in their next six Westerns.

Adams's breakout role as a third-billed part in Universal Pictures' Bright Victory (1951), the audience response was enough that Universal put Adams under contract. Universal didn't like the name "Betty", so they changed her name to "Julia". She eventually changed it herself to "Julie". "The studio picked Julia, but I never have felt comfortable with it. I just like the name Julie better, and the studio has given me permission to make the change."

While under contract with Universal, she co-starred in films opposite some of Hollywood's top leading men, including with James Stewart in Bend of the River (1952), with Rock Hudson in The Lawless Breed (1953) and One Desire (1955), with Tyrone Power in The Mississippi Gambler (1953), with Glenn Ford in The Man from the Alamo (1953).

She was featured as the beautiful ichthyologist Kay Lawrence in the horror film Creature from the Black Lagoon (1954). The white one-piece swimsuit worn by Adams in the film was made exclusively for her. The studio, for publicity purposes, had Adams's legs insured by Lloyd's of London for $125,000. Although two sequels to Creature were made, Adams did not want to appear in them. Ultimately, Adams is best remembered for her role in Creature.

Adams with Rory Calhoun in the film The Looters (1955), the story of a plane crash in the Rocky Mountains. Part of the picture was filmed about Tarryall Creek at what is now Eleven Mile State Park in Park County in central Colorado. The advertising poster reads: "Five desperate men ... and a girl who didn't care ... trapped on a mountain of gale-lashed rock!"

Adams starred with Charlton Heston in The Private War of Major Benson (1955) and with Dan Duryea in Slaughter on Tenth Avenue (1957). She also starred in 1957's Four Girls in Town, a romantic comedy about four young women competing for the leading role in a new movie, featuring an international cast. In 1957, Adams's run at Universal came to an end with Slim Carter. After that, she did have a few more film appearances, but most of her work would be in television.

Adams's post-Universal films included The Gunfight at Dodge City (1959) with Joel McCrea. She appeared with Elvis Presley in the musical-comedy Tickle Me (1965). Adams thought highly of her co-star, noting: "He was such a gentleman, and surprisingly shy... I was quite in awe of him because he would do a musical number in one take, and that was wonderful".

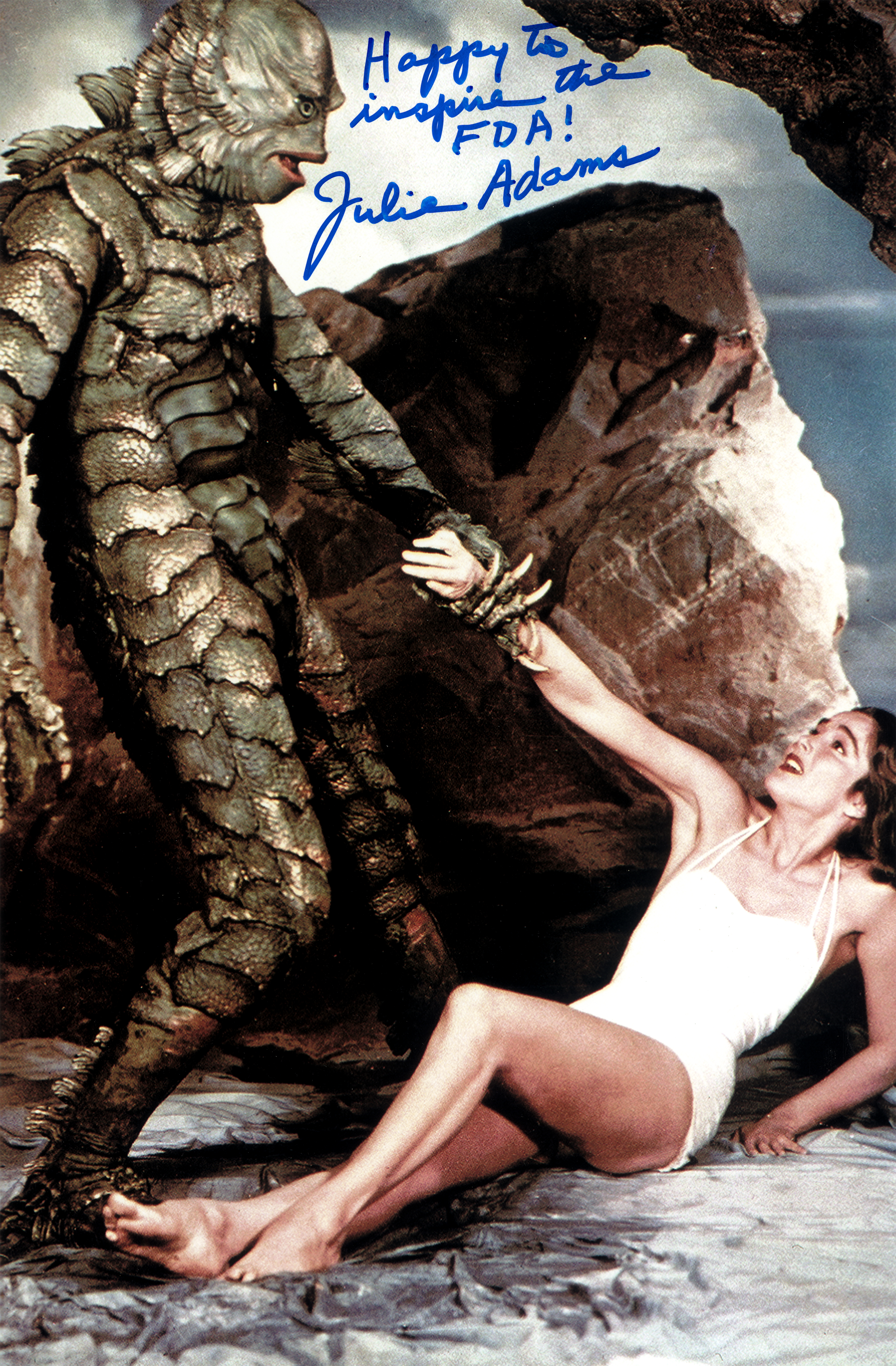
Adams was famously menaced in the 1954 horror classic Creature from the Black Lagoon

=== Television ===
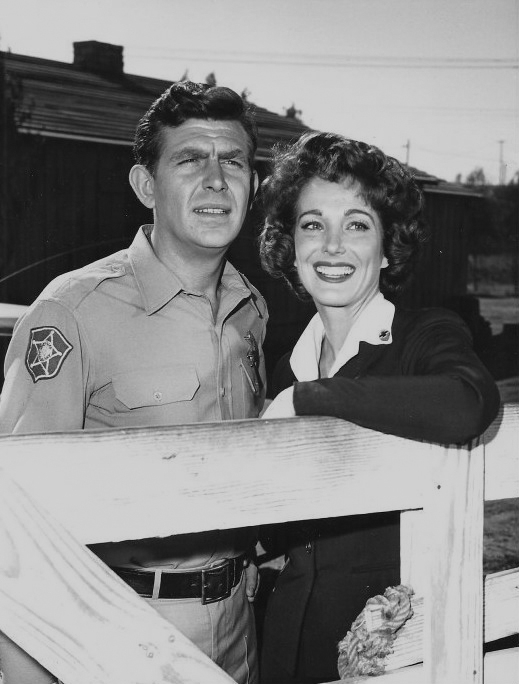
Julie Adams with Andy Griffith on The Andy Griffith Show (1962)

On television, Adams appeared on The Andy Griffith Show portraying Mary Simpson, a county nurse and romantic interest of Sheriff Andy Taylor in a 1962 episode. She also made four guest appearances on Perry Mason, including the 1963 episode, "The Case of the Deadly Verdict", in which she played Janice Barton, Mason's only convicted client during the show's nine-year run on CBS. In 1963, she starred in "The Case Of Lovers Leap". In 1964, she played Janice Blake in "The Case of the Missing Button". In 1965, she played the role of defendant Pat Kean in "The Case of the Fatal Fortune". Adams appeared on The Rifleman as a dubious vixen and romantic interest of lead character Chuck Connors. She guest-starred in five episodes of 77 Sunset Strip, three of Alfred Hitchcock Presents, and two of Maverick, "The White Widow" and "The Brasada Spur", both with Jack Kelly as Bart Maverick. She also guest starred in an episode of "Mannix" in 1967 called "Then the Drink Takes the Man."

More guest-star roles in popular television series followed, including One Step Beyond; The Big Valley, in its classic episode "The Emperor of Rice'"; McMillan & Wife; Police Woman; The Streets of San Francisco; The Incredible Hulk; Cannon; Quincy, M.E.; Too Close for Comfort; and Cagney & Lacey. Adams co-starred with James Stewart in all 24 episodes of The Jimmy Stewart Show on NBC in 1971–1972. Stewart played a professor, and Adams played his wife. She was cast in the recurring role of real estate agent Eve Simpson for ten episodes of CBS's Murder, She Wrote.

=== Appearances ===
Adams originally had no interest in monster movie conventions. However, in 2003, Ben Chapman convinced her to join him for a 50th anniversary celebration of Creature from the Black Lagoon at Creaturefest in 2002. The festival was held at Wakulla Springs, just south of Tallahassee, Florida, where underwater scenes were filmed in 1953.

In October 2012, the Academy of Motion Picture Arts and Sciences selected Creature from the Black Lagoon as one of 13 classic horror films to screen to honor the 100th anniversary of Universal Pictures. The film was shown (in 3D format) on October 16 at the Samuel Goldwyn Theater in Beverly Hills, California.

== Personal life and death ==
Adams was married to screenwriter Leonard B. Stern from 1951 to 1953.

Adams met Ray Danton while they both were working on the 1955 film The Looters. They married on March 20, 1955. The couple had two sons: Steven Richard Danton (b. 1956), an assistant director, and Mitchell Danton, a film editor. They divorced in 1974.

Adams died at age 92 on February 3, 2019, in Los Angeles, California.

== Awards ==
In 1999, Adams received a Golden Boot award for her work in Westerns. She was inducted into the Arkansas Entertainers Hall of Fame in 2000. At CineCon in 2011, Adams was honored with a Film Career Achievement Award. In 2012, she won the Rondo Award for the Monster Kid Hall of Fame at the annual Wonderfest in Louisville, Kentucky. In 2013, Adams received the University of Arkansas at Little Rock's Distinguished Alumni Award.
