= The Lady Takes a Flyer =

1958 film by Jack Arnold

- Film poster by Reynold Brown
- Directed by: Jack Arnold
- Screenplay by: Danny Arnold
- Based on: story by Edmund H. North
- Produced by: William Alland
- Starring: Lana Turner; Jeff Chandler
- Cinematography: Irving Glassberg
- Edited by: Sherman Todd
- Music by: Herman Stein
- Production company: Universal Pictures
- Distributed by: Universal Pictures
- Release date: January 30, 1958
- Running time: 95 minutes
- Country: United States
- Language: English
- Box office: $1 million

The Lady Takes a Flyer is a 1958 American CinemaScope Eastmancolor comedy-drama romance film released by Universal Pictures. It was directed by Jack Arnold and written by Danny Arnold based on a story by Edmund H. North.

The story is based on the real life experiences of couple Jack and Mary Ford, known among aviators as “The Flying Fords.” Jack Ford served as a consultant on the film.

== Plot ==
Daredevil pilot Mike Dandridge enters into a business partnership with flight-school pal Al Reynolds and meets Maggie Colby, who is also a pilot.

The two flyers take cargo to Japan, where they become romantically involved. Al is best man at their wedding, then joins the Air Force.

Mike hires new pilot Nikki Taylor and might be having an affair with her during business trips while Maggie stays home with their new baby. Maggie flies a shipment herself and lets Mike care of their daughter. He and copilot Phil take a risk by bringing the baby along on a flight to London. Their plane has difficulty landing in fog, angering Maggie, whose own plane barely landed safely. However, Mike and Maggie are brought closer by the experience.

== Cast ==
- Lana Turner as Maggie Colby
- Jeff Chandler as Mike Dandridge
- Richard Denning as Al Reynolds
- Andra Martin as Nikki Taylor
- Chuck Connors as Phil Donahoe
- Reta Shaw as Nurse Kennedy
- Alan Hale Jr. as Frank Henshaw
- Jerry Paris as Willie Ridgeley
- Dee J. Thompson as Collie Minor
- Nestor Paiva as Childreth
- James Doherty as Tower Operator

== Production ==
The film was based on an original screenplay, originally known as Pilots for Hire, then Lion in the Sky. The film was also known as Wild and Wonderful. It was the first of a two-picture deal that Turner had signed with Universal.

Filming began in April 1957.

A novelization of the screenplay, illustrated with production stills, was written by American writer Edward S. Aarons under the pseudonym Edward Ronns.

== Reception ==
Variety magazine said "Teaming of Lana Turner and Jeff Chandler figure .to help the chances of this peacetime air yarn, which: otherwise falls short of satisfactory entertainment. . Film is burdened with plodding treatment that militates against ready acceptance, but star names-— particularly femme’s firepower after her performance in Peyton Place (1957) -— coupled with a spicy bathtub sequence may. be exploited for fair returns in general market."

== Sources ==
- Reemes, Dana M. 1988. Directed by Jack Arnold. McFarland & Company, Jefferson, North Carolina 1988. ISBN 978-0899503318
