= Sally Brophy =

American actress, professor (1928–2007)

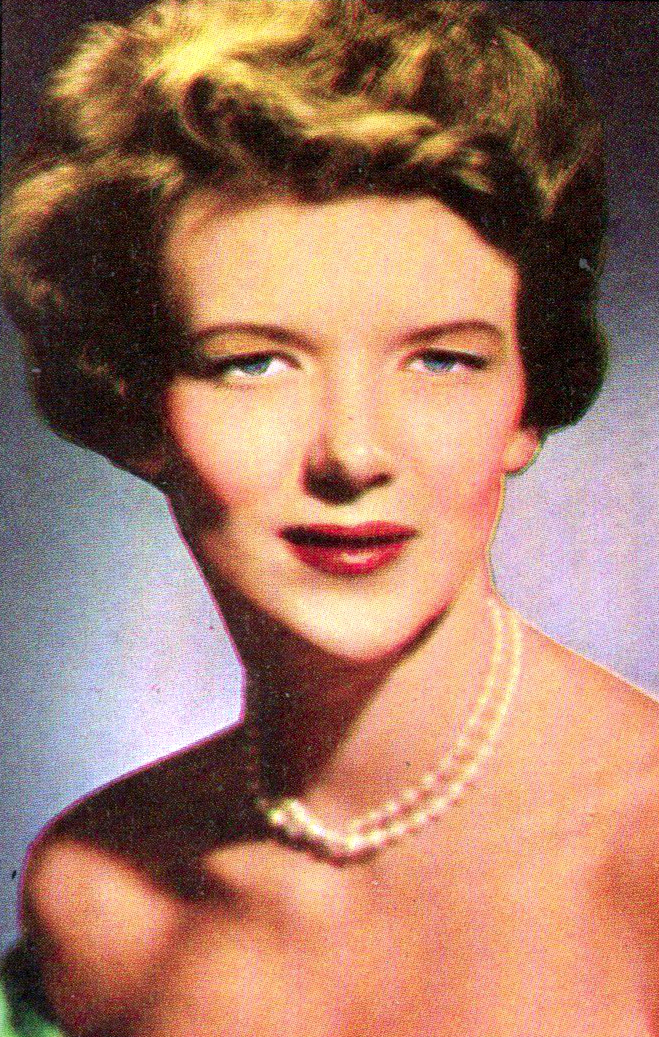
- Brophy in 1953
- Born: Sally Cullen Brophy; December 14, 1928; Phoenix, Arizona, U.S.
- Died: September 18, 2007 (aged 78); Princeton, New Jersey, U.S.
- Years active: 1953–1965
- Spouse: George Goodman (m. 1961)
- Children: 2

Sally Cullen Brophy (December 14, 1928 – September 18, 2007) was a Broadway and television actress and college theatre-arts professor.

== Early years ==
Born Frances Culen Brophy, she was the daughter of Mr. and Mrs. Frank Cullen Brophy. Her father was a rancher; Brophy was born in Phoenix, Arizona, and was one of seven children. She was active in dramatics at Sacred Heart Convent in Menlo Park, California, and attended College of New Rochelle. Additional experience came from her work as a summer apprentice at Westport, Connecticut's Theatre Guild. She studied at the Royal Academy of Dramatic Art in London, and then pursued a career on Broadway as Sally Brophy.

== Stage ==
Brophy starred with John Loder and Natalie Schafer in For Love or Money at the Sombrero Playhouse in Phoenix during January 1950. She also acted in the Phoenix Little Theatre. She worked in Private Lives with Tallulah Bankhead. In 1951, she was an understudy in Second Threshold. In 1954–1955, she starred as the grown-up "Wendy" in Peter Pan.

== Television ==
Brophy starred as Julie Fielding in Follow Your Heart on NBC-TV in 1953. In 1954, she guest-starred on an episode of the CBS crime drama, The Public Defender, starring Reed Hadley, and in an episode of Medic entitled "I Climb the Stairs". The next year, she appeared in the debut episode of Code 3 and in the episodes "In Nebraska" and "The Long Road to Tucson" in the roles of Lucy Miller and Sister Michael, respectively, of NBC's Western anthology television series Frontier.

Her other television appearances included the Rod Cameron syndicated series State Trooper and in the Frank Lovejoy 1957–1958 NBC detective series, Meet McGraw.

In 1958, she portrayed Annie O'Connell, co-starring in the NBC Western series Buckskin, a summer replacement series for The Ford Show, Starring Tennessee Ernie Ford. Brophy played widow Annie O'Connell, who ran a boarding house in the fictitious "Old West" town of Buckskin, Montana. The other stars were Tom Nolan, as Annie's 10-year-old son Jody, who was the narrator, and Mike Road, as Marshal Tom Sellers. Buckskin ran for 39 episodes from 1958 to 1959. Brophy and Nolan also appeared together in the March 5, 1959, episode of The Ford Show.

After Buckskin, Brophy had several additional guest roles; her last was in 1965 on Richard Crenna's CBS drama, Slattery's People.

== Family ==
In 1961, Brophy married George Goodman, an investment manager and financial reporter, who later became a best-selling economics author and TV personality under the pseudonym of "Adam Smith". The couple had two children. When Brophy retired from acting, the couple moved to Princeton, New Jersey.

== Teaching career ==
Brophy joined the faculty of Rider University (then Rider College) in nearby Lawrenceville, where she taught theater arts. She also directed student productions at Princeton University.

== Death ==
She died in Princeton, New Jersey, aged 78, of non-Hodgkin's lymphoma.
