= Slim Carter =

1957 film by Richard Bartlett

- Theatrical release poster
- Directed by: Richard Bartlett
- Screenplay by: Montgomery Pittman
- Story by: David Bramson; Mary C. McCall Jr.
- Produced by: Howie Horwitz
- Starring: Jock Mahoney; Julie Adams; Tim Hovey; William Hopper; Ben Johnson; Joanna Moore
- Cinematography: Ellis W. Carter
- Edited by: Fred MacDowell
- Music by: Herman Stein
- Production company: Universal-International Pictures
- Distributed by: Universal-International Pictures
- Release date: October 2, 1957
- Running time: 82 minutes
- Country: United States
- Language: English

Slim Carter is a 1957 American comedy film directed by Richard Bartlett and written by Montgomery Pittman. The film stars Jock Mahoney, Julie Adams, Tim Hovey, William Hopper, Ben Johnson and Joanna Moore. The film was released on October 2, 1957, by Universal-International Pictures.

== Plot ==
Clover Doyle discovers an unpleasant singing cowboy Hughie Mack, and begins promoting him as the renamed Slim Carter. An orphan boy wins a contest to spend time with Mack/Carter, and good qualities begin to emerge.

== Cast ==
- Jock Mahoney as Slim Carter aka Hugh Mack
- Julie Adams as Clover Doyle
- Tim Hovey as Leo Gallaher
- William Hopper as Joe Brewster
- Ben Johnson as Montana Burriss
- Joanna Moore as Charlene Carroll
- Walter Reed as Richard L. Howard
- Margaret Field as Hat Check Girl
- Bill Williams as Frank Hanneman
- Barbara Hale as Allie Hanneman
