= Tim Hovey =

American actor and musician

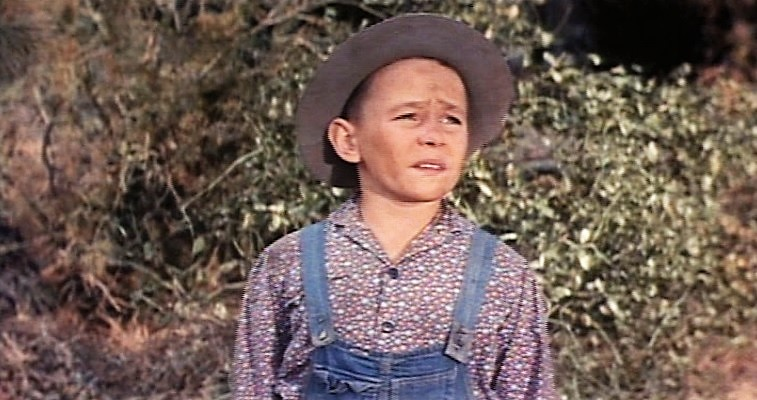
- Hovey in a trailer for the 1958 film Money, Women and Guns
- Born: June 19, 1945; Los Angeles, California, U.S.
- Died: September 9, 1989 (aged 44); Watsonville, California, U.S.
- Cause of death: Suicide by overdose
- Other name: Timothy Hovey
- Occupations: Actor, musician, audio engineer and road manager
- Years active: 1955–1989

Tim Hovey (June 19, 1945 – September 9, 1989) was an American child actor during the 1950s. He later became a musician, road manager and an audio engineer for rock bands.

== Acting career ==
Born in Los Angeles, California, Hovey was discovered by a talent agent who saw his photo in the window of a photography shop. In 1955, he made his acting debut in an episode of Lassie. Later that year, he made his film debut as Tiger Flaherty opposite Charlton Heston in The Private War of Major Benson.

From 1955 to 1959, Hovey worked steadily in films and television, often playing characters younger than his real age due to his small stature. In 1957, he was signed to a film contract with Universal-International. While working at U-I, Hovey appeared in the Westerns Slim Carter and Money, Women and Guns, both opposite Jock Mahoney.

Hovey's final onscreen appearance was in an episode of the anthology series Schlitz Playhouse of the Stars, in 1959. Despite receiving an offer to appear in a Broadway play produced and directed by Otto Preminger, Hovey chose to retire from acting.

== Later years ==
In the 1970s and 1980s, Hovey lived in Northern California and worked with computers. He was also the road manager for the rock band Grateful Dead. Hovey later learned how to play the slide guitar and would play with the band on occasion. From 1971 to 1977, Hovey served as the chief audio engineer for the Grateful Dead and Kingfish, the side project of Grateful Dead guitarist Bob Weir. He is credited as co-writer of "Important Exportin' Man" (with Dave Torbert), on the album The Adventures of Panama Red, by the New Riders of the Purple Sage.

== Death ==
On September 9, 1989, Hovey died of an intentional drug overdose at his home in Watsonville, California. Hovey's suicide, along with the suicides of fellow former child actors Trent Lehman and Rusty Hamer, prompted Paul Petersen to form the child actor advocacy group A Minor Consideration.

== Filmography ==
Year	Title	Role	Notes
1955	Lassie	Malcolm	2 episodes Credited as Timothy Hovey
1955	The Private War of Major Benson	Cadet Thomas "Tiger" Flaherty	
1955	The Colgate Comedy Hour	Cadet Flaherty	Episode #5.38
1955	Queen Bee	Ted Phillips	
1956	The Toy Tiger	Timmie Harkinson	
1956	Lux Video Theatre	Austin	Episode: "The Gay Sisters"
1956	Everything but the Truth	Willie Taylor	
1956	The Family Nobody Wanted	Donny	Playhouse 90 episode
1957	Man Afraid	Michael Collins	
1957	Slim Carter	Leo Gallaher	
1957	The Lux Show with Rosemary Clooney	Himself	Episode #1.11
1958	General Electric Theatre	Frank Morgan	Episode: "Kid at the Stick"
1958	Kraft Television Theatre	Jeff Hillyer	Episode: "Material Witness"
1958	Money, Women and Guns	Davy Kingman	
1958	Cimarron City	Avery Wickham	Episode: "Cimarron Holiday"
1959	Schlitz Playhouse of the Stars	Timmy Parker	Episode: "Ivy League"

== Bibliography ==
- Holmstrom, John. The Moving Picture Boy: An International Encyclopaedia from 1895 to 1995, Norwich, Michael Russell, 1996, pp. 253–254.
- Best, Marc. Those Endearing Young Charms: Child Performers of the Screen, South Brunswick and New York: Barnes & Co., 1971, pp. 116–121.
