= The Private War of Major Benson =

1955 film by Jerry Hopper

- Film poster by Reynold Brown
- Directed by: Jerry Hopper
- Screenplay by: William Roberts; Richard Alan Simmons
- Story by: Joe Connelly; Bob Mosher
- Produced by: Howard Pine
- Starring: Charlton Heston; Julie Adams; William Demarest; Sal Mineo; Tim Hovey
- Cinematography: Harold Lipstein
- Edited by: Ted J. Kent
- Music by: Henry Mancini
- Distributed by: Universal-International
- Release date: August 2, 1955
- Running time: 105 minutes
- Country: United States
- Language: English

The Private War of Major Benson is 1955 American military comedy film starring Charlton Heston, Julie Adams, Sal Mineo and Tim Hovey, about a tough-talking U.S. Army officer who must shape up the JROTC program at Sheridan Academy, a Catholic boys' military academy, or be forced out of the Army.

The film was shot on St. Catherine's Military School campus in 1955, with a full battalion of student cadets as the actors in all but the leading roles.

The film's basic premise was used twice in the following 40 years; Hard Knox (1984) and most notably Major Payne (1995), another Universal picture.

== Plot summary ==
Major Barney Benson, a hard-bitten combat soldier of World War II and the Korean Conflict with a Distinguished Service Cross, a Silver Star, and a 2nd Award of the Combat Infantry Badge, runs afoul of the Army bureaucracy with his theories concerning troop training in peacetime. As penance for ruffling the military's feathers, he is assigned as the Commandant of Sheridan Military Academy, a boys military school run by Roman Catholic nuns under the JROTC system.

Benson is not happy about his assignment, though he fancies the school's doctor, Kay Lambert, who returns his attentions. He is hard on the boys, who respond to his unforgiving approach by sending a petition to the father of Cadet Hibler, who has influence with a Congressman and through him, with the Pentagon, demanding his removal.

Compelled by custom to coach the Sheridan football team, which has not won a game in four years, Benson teaches the boys the Notre Dame T system, works them hard, and leads them to the league championship for the first time ever. However, the boys are not happy with their championship because Benson had taken all the fun out of the game. They refuse to place the trophy commemorating their victory in the niche chosen for it. Benson is thoroughly disillusioned with himself, the cadets, and the school.

He contacts his wartime commander, Major General Ramsey, asking for a transfer. Unbeknownst to Benson, the head of the school, Reverend Mother Redempta, is the general's sister. She has been keeping General Ramsey informed of Benson's progress at Sheridan. Rebuked, Major Benson returns to the school, determined to better understand the boys under his command.

After a bad day on the drill field where he is attempting to prepare the cadets for the annual JROTC inspection, Benson hitchhikes into town. There he discovers "Tiger" Flaherty, the most junior cadet in the school, trying to run away to his home in Los Angeles. He and Tiger talk as they walk back to the academy, and Tiger shows the Major how to sneak back onto the campus without getting caught. After Kay's watch, a present from the Corps of Cadets, disappears he tracks it down and discovers Cadet Hibler had "borrowed" it so he could work on it. He had taken it apart all right, but then could not put it back together. Theft is an expulsion offense at Sheridan, but Hibler is let off without so much as a demerit when he explains his motive to the Major. These two incidents cause the cadets to revise their opinion of Benson, but the petition has already been sent off, and the military wheels are grinding. It is entirely possible Benson will be dismissed from the Army because of it.

General Ramsey comes out to Sheridan for the annual JROTC tests. With Benson sidelined by a case of the measles, Cadet Lieutenant Colonel Dusik has taken over and relentlessly drilled the cadets under his command so they perform flawlessly for the inspectors. The school passes the test, insuring they will be retained in the JROTC program. The General informs Major Benson that he has been selected to command a battalion at Fort Benning, with an excellent chance for promotion in a year or so. Barney proposes to Kay, and she accepts. The sisters who run the academy are sorry to see them go, but are nevertheless happy for the couple.

== Cast ==
- Charlton Heston as Maj. Barney Benson
- Julie Adams as Dr. Kay Lambert
- William Demarest as John
- Tim Hovey as Cadet Tiger Flaherty
- Sal Mineo as Cadet Dusik
- Tim Considine as Cadet Hibler
- Nana Bryant as Mother Redempta
- Milburn Stone as General Ramsey

== Reception ==
Bosley Crowther of The New York Times wrote, " 'The Private War of Major Benson,' which came to the Plaza yesterday, demonstrates again the rigid precept that you can't win a battle against kids ... There are plenty of laughs in this picture — at the disciplinarian's expense. This may not be rightly regimental, but it is in the popular vein."

== Box Office ==
The Private War of Major Benson was made with a budget of $750,000. It earned $2.5 million at the box office, making it a success for Universal. Charlton Heston was not paid a flat fee for his work in the movie. Instead, he opted for a percentage of the gross.

== Accolades ==
Screenwriters Joe Connelly and Bob Mosher were nominated for the Academy Award for Best Story.
