= One Desire =

1955 film by Jerry Hopper

- Film poster by Reynold Brown
- Directed by: Jerry Hopper
- Screenplay by: Lawrence Roman; Robert Blees
- Based on: Tacey Cromwell; 1942 novel by Conrad Richter
- Produced by: Ross Hunter
- Starring: Anne Baxter; Rock Hudson; Julia Adams
- Cinematography: Maury Gertsman
- Edited by: Milton Carruth
- Music by: Frank Skinner; Henry Mancini (uncredited)
- Production company: Universal Pictures
- Release date: September 2, 1955
- Running time: 94 minutes
- Country: United States
- Language: English

One Desire is a 1955 Technicolor drama romance film directed by Jerry Hopper and starring Anne Baxter, Julia Adams and Rock Hudson. Described as a "rugged story of oil-boom Oklahoma in the early 1900s", it was adapted from Conrad Richter's best-selling 1942 novel Tacey Cromwell. Baxter portrays a gambling house owner, Hudson a card dealer turned bank president and Adams the woman who comes between them. A young Natalie Wood is also in a featured role.

Although the music is generally by Frank Skinner, the film features a Henry Mancini song sung by Gene Boyd and backed by the Glenn Miller Orchestra which was uncredited to Mancini.

== Plot ==
Clint Saunders is dismissed from his job as the White Palace saloon's card dealer after coming to work late. He doesn't mind, wishing to leave for Colorado and the lucrative silver mines there. Saloon owner Tacey Cromwell, in love with Clint, decides to leave with him and Clint's little brother Nugget, even though Clint doesn't wish to settle down.

In their new town, Clint becomes acquainted with prosperous Judith Watrous, a senator's daughter, who offers him a job running her bank and is obviously attracted to him. Tacey does her best to make a proper home for Nugget and for a young tomboy, Seely Dowder, taking in the girl when she becomes an orphan.

The haughty Judith learns of Tacey's past life, after having hired a private investigator and jealously has custody of the children taken from Tacey while Clint is out of town. A broken-hearted Tacey returns to her old saloon job, while Clint remains behind and marries Judith. As years go by, Seely grows up and encounters Tacey again. They return to Colorado, where upon discovering how Judith betrayed her, Tacey plans to open a rowdy new saloon, right across the street from the Judith/Clint home out of spite.

During a quarrel, a drunken Judith throws a lantern at Clint and sets their house ablaze. ( note they live in the "Herman Munster" house and ride by the "Beaver Cleaver" house too). She perishes in the fire. Tacey's saloon catches fire as well and burns to the ground. Tacey, the children and Clint vow to carry on and rebuild their lives.

== Cast ==
- Anne Baxter as Tacey Cromwell
- Rock Hudson as Clint Saunders
- Barry Curtis as Nugget Saunders
- Julia Adams as Judith Watrous
- Carl Benton Reid as Sen. Kenneth A. Watrous
- Natalie Wood as Seely Dowder
- Betty Garde as Mrs. O'Dell
- William Hopper as MacBain

== Reception ==
The Ames Daily Tribune praised the "exciting climax" of the film with a drunken quarrel and fire, and praised the "ace high" of the cast in their "demanding" roles. The New York Times described it as "nothing thing more than a plodding, old-fashioned soap opera" triangle and that "some spectators may find themselves simply tuning in, eyes closed, to the familiar train of events, dialogue and musical effects", although praised the performances of the cast. One book described it as "another 50s melodrama made at Universal".

== See also ==
- List of American films of 1955
