= Jerry Hopper =

American film director (1907–1988)

- Born: Harold Hankins Hopper; July 29, 1907; Guthrie, Oklahoma, U.S.
- Died: December 17, 1988 (aged 81); San Clemente, California, U.S.
- Occupation: Director
- Spouses: Marsha Hunt (m. 1938; div. 1943): Winifred Joyce Robinson (married 1949-?); Dorothy Ellis (married 1984)
- Children: 6

Harold Hankins Hopper (July 29, 1907 – December 17, 1988), known professionally as Jerry Hopper, was an American film and television director, active from the mid-1940s through the early 1970s.

== Early life ==
Jerry Hopper was born in Guthrie, Oklahoma.

== Career ==
Hopper started as an office assistant at Paramount Pictures before becoming a radio scriptwriter and an editor before moving to the directors' chair for several installments of their Musical Parade series (1946–48). Hopper went on to direct feature films, such as, The Atomic City (1952), Pony Express (1953), Secret of the Incas (1954), and The Private War of Major Benson (1955), the latter three with actor Charlton Heston. In 1958 he directed Brandon deWilde and Lee Marvin in The Missouri Traveler.

He then moved primarily into episodic television, having directed Colt .45, Bachelor Father, Wagon Train, Gunsmoke, The Addams Family, Burke's Law, Perry Mason, The Fugitive, Gilligan's Island, and Voyage to the Bottom of the Sea, among many others.

== Personal life ==
Hopper married actress Marsha Hunt on November 23, 1938. They divorced in 1943. He married Winifred Joyce Robinson in 1949. He later was married to actress Dorothy Ellis. Hopper had four sons and two daughters.

During World War II he became a combat photographer for the Army and was injured during the Battle of Leyte and received a Purple Heart.

He died of heart disease on December 17, 1988, in San Clemente, California, at age 81.

== Filmography ==
- Madron (1970)
- The Virginian (2 episodes, 1963–1970). TV episodes: The West vs. Colonel MacKenzie (1970) & Duel at Shiloh (1963). Both were combined and released as The Bull of the West in 1971.
- Maharlika (1970) (as Jerr Hopper)
- It Takes a Thief (1 episode, 1969). TV episode: Catspaw (1969)
- Get Smart (2 episodes, 1968). TV episodes A Tale of Two Tails (1968) & Diamonds Are a Spy's Best Friend (1968)
- Voyage to the Bottom of the Sea (15 episodes, 1965–1968). TV episodes: Attack! (1968) & Man-Beast (1968) & Terrible Leprechaun (1968) & Deadly Amphibians (1967) & Terror (1967) plus 10 more.
- Mr. Terrific (1 episode, 1967). TV episode: Stanley and the Mountaineers (1967)
- Gilligan's Island (7 episodes, 1966–1967): TV episodes: Splashdown (1967) & All About Eva (1966) & And Then There Were None (1966) & The Kidnapper (1966) & Gilligan vs. Gilligan (1966) plus 2 more.
- It's About Time (4 episodes, 1966). TV episodes: The Mother-in-Law (1966) & Androcles and Clon (1966) & Cave Movies (1966) & The Champ (1966)
- The Time Tunnel (1 episode, 1966). TV episode: Devil's Island (1966)
- Laredo (1 episode, 1966). TV episode: The Dance of the Laughing Death (1966)
- The Fugitive (14 episodes, 1963–1966). TV episodes: Coralee (1966) & Conspiracy of Silence (1965) & Escape into Black (1964) & Dark Corner (1964) & Nemesis (1964) plus 9 more.
- Perry Mason (8 episodes, 1961–1966). TV episodes: The Case of the Crafty Kidnapper (1966) & The Case of the Avenging Angel (1966) & The Case of the Misguided Model (1966) & The Case of the Counterfeit Crank (1962) & The Case of the Melancholy Marksman (1962) &The Case of the Tarnished Trademark (1962) & The Case of the Roving River (1961) & The Case of The Left-Handed Liar (1961)
- A Man Called Shenandoah (1 episode, 1966). TV episode: The Last Diablo (1966)
- Honey West (1 episode, 1965). TV episode: A Nice Little Till to Tap (1965)
- Burke's Law (11 episodes, 1964–1965). TV episodes: A Little Gift for Cairo (1965) & The Man's Men (1965) & Who Killed the Card? (1965) & Who Killed the Rabbit's Husband? (1965) & Who Killed Nobody Somehow? (1965) plus 6 more
- 12 O'Clock High (2 episodes, 1965). TV episodes: We're Not Coming Back (1965) & Big Brother (1965) TV episode
- Valentine's Day (3 episodes, 1964). TV episodes: The Seasick Sailor (1964) & Yen Ku Horowitz (1964) & The Baritone Canary (1964)
- The Addams Family (4 episodes, 1964). TV episodes: Morticia, the Matchmaker (1964) & Green-Eyed Gomez (1964) & The Addams Family Tree (1964) & Gomez, the Politician (1964)
- Gunsmoke (4 episodes, 1963–1964). TV episodes: Owney Tupper Had a Daughter (1964) & The Glory and the Mud (1964) & Pa Hack's Brood (1963) & Carter Caper (1963)
- Vacation Playhouse (1 episode, 1963). TV episode: Hooray for Love (1963)
- Wagon Train (13 episodes, 1958–1963). TV episodes: Alias Bill Hawks (1963) & The Roger Bigelow Story (1960) & The Horace Best Story (1960) & The Dick Jarvis Story (1960) & The Alexander Portlass Story (1960) plus 8 more
- Have Gun - Will Travel ( 4episodes, 1962–1963). TV episodes : trial at tabelrock Unforgiving Minute (1963) & Bob Wire (1963) & Marshal of Sweetwater (1962)
- The Alfred Hitchcock Hour (1 episode, 1962). TV episode: Day of Reckoning (1962)
- The New Breed (1 episode, 1962). TV episode: Walk This Street Lightly (1962)
- Tales of Wells Fargo (2 episodes, 1957–1961). TV episodes: Casket 7.3 (1961) & A Time to Kill (1957)
- Westinghouse Playhouse (2 episodes, 1961). TV episodes: The Mrs. Harper Story (1961) & Buddy's Formal Dinner (1961)
- Blueprint for Robbery (1961)
- Bat Masterson (1 episode, 1960). TV episode: The Last of the Night Raiders (1960)
- Cheyenne (1 episode, 1960). TV episode: Counterfeit Gun (1960)
- Mr. Lucky (2 episodes, 1959–1960). TV episodes: Election Bet (1960) & My Little Gray Home (1959)
- M Squad (3 episodes, 1959–1960). TV episodes: Diary of a Bomber (1960) & Race to Death (1960) & Shred of Doubt (1959)
- Overland Trail (1 episode, 1960). TV episode: The O'Mara's Ladies (1960)
- Westinghouse Desilu Playhouse (1 episode, 1959). TV episode: Ballad for a Bad Man (1959)
- The Untouchables (1 episode, 1959). TV episode: The Dutch Schultz Story (1959)
- Wichita Town (2 episodes, 1959). TV episodes: Drifting (1959) & The Night the Cowboys Roared (1959)
- Law of the Plainsman (1 episode, 1959). TV episode: Full Circle (1959)
- Markham (1 episode, 1959). TV episode: The Glass Diamond (1959)
- The Rifleman (4 episodes, 1958–1959). TV episodes: The Angry Man (1959) & The Deadeye Kid (1959) & The Gaucho (1958) & End of a Young Gun (1958)
- Dick Powell's Zane Grey Theater (2 episodes, 1958–1959). TV episodes: Deadfall (1959) & Legacy of a Legend (1958)
- Naked City (1 episode, 1958). TV episode: Meridian (1958)
- Bachelor Father (15 episodes, 1957–1958). TV episodes: Uncle Bentley and the Matchmaker (1958) & Waiting Up for Kelly (1958) & Bentley and the Social Worker (1958) & Uncle Bentley Loans Out Peter (1958) & Bentley and His Junior Image (1958) plus 10 more
- Jefferson Drum (1 episode, 1958). TV episode: Law and Order (1958)
- How to Marry a Millionaire (1 episode, 1958). TV episode: A Call to Arms (1958)
- The Missouri Traveler (1958)
- Leave It to Beaver (1 episode, 1957). TV episode: It's a Small World (1957)
- The Jane Wyman Show (1 episode, 1957). TV episode: The Wildcatter (1957)
- Everything But the Truth (1956)
- The Sharkfighters (1956)
- The Toy Tiger (1956)
- Never Say Goodbye (1956)
- The Square Jungle (1955)
- The Private War of Major Benson (1955)
- One Desire (1955)
- Smoke Signal (1955)
- Naked Alibi (1954)
- Secret of the Incas (1954)
- Alaska Seas (1954)
- Pony Express (1953)
- Hurricane Smith (1952)
- The Atomic City (1952)
- The Cinematographer (1951) (uncredited)
- History Brought to Life (1950) (uncredited)
- Jingle, Jangle, Jingle (1948)
- Smooth Sailing (1947)
- Sweet and Low (1947)
- Golden Slippers (1946)
