= Smoke Signal (film) =

1955 film

- Directed by: Jerry Hopper
- Screenplay by: George F. Slavin; George W. George
- Story by: George F. Slavin; George W. George
- Produced by: Howard Christie
- Starring: Dana Andrews; Piper Laurie; Rex Reason
- Cinematography: Clifford Stine
- Edited by: Milton Carruth
- Color process: Technicolor
- Production company: Universal International Pictures
- Distributed by: Universal Pictures
- Release date: March 1, 1955
- Running time: 88 minutes
- Country: United States
- Language: English
- Box office: $1 million (US)

Smoke Signal is a 1955 American Western film directed by Jerry Hopper and starring Dana Andrews, Piper Laurie and Rex Reason. It was produced and distributed by Universal Pictures.

== Plot ==
Cavalry officer Brett Halliday is facing a court-martial for treason over his defection to a Ute tribe that has been making raids on soldiers. After a bloody attack at the fort, survivors ford the Colorado River in boats, fleeing for their lives. They include the captain now in charge, plus Laura Evans, daughter of the dead commanding officer, and Lt. Ford, who is in love with Laura.

Harper is intent on bringing Halliday to justice. Ford falls to his death from a cliff while fighting with Halliday, who helps the others fend off another attack. A grateful Capt. Harper can't bring himself to set Halliday free, but hints that he will not interfere if Halliday should escape. Laura hopes to see him again as Halliday gets away.

== Cast ==
- Dana Andrews as Brett Halliday
- Piper Laurie as Laura Evans
- Rex Reason as Lt. Wayne Ford
- William Talman as Capt. Harper
- Milburn Stone as Sgt. Miles
- Douglas Spencer as Garode
- Gordon Jones as Cpl. Rogers
- William Schallert as Pvt. Livingston
- Robert Wilke as 1st Sgt. Daly
- Bill Phipps as Pvt. Poster
- Pat Hogan as Delche
- Peter Coe as Ute Prisoner

== Production ==
Parts of the film were shot in Professor Valley, Ida Gulch, Courthouse Wash, and San Juan River in Utah.

== See also ==
- List of American films of 1955
