= Money, Women and Guns =

Film directed by Richard Bartlett

- Theatrical release poster
- Directed by: Richard Bartlett
- Screenplay by: Montgomery Pittman
- Produced by: Howie Horwitz
- Starring: Jock Mahoney; Kim Hunter; Tim Hovey; Gene Evans; Tom Drake; Lon Chaney Jr. William Campbell; Jeffrey Stone; James Gleason; Judi Meredith; Phillip Terry
- Cinematography: Philip H. Lathrop
- Edited by: Patrick McCormack
- Production company: Universal-International Pictures
- Distributed by: Universal-International Pictures
- Release dates: June 21, 1958 (Los Angeles-Premiere); October 1958 (United States)
- Running time: 80 minutes
- Country: United States
- Language: English

Money, Women and Guns is a 1958 American Western film directed by Richard Bartlett and written by Montgomery Pittman. The film stars Jock Mahoney, Kim Hunter, Tim Hovey, Gene Evans, Tom Drake, Lon Chaney Jr., William Campbell, Jeffrey Stone, James Gleason, Judi Meredith, and Phillip Terry. The film was released in October 1958, by Universal Pictures.

== Plot ==
After a gold prospector is killed by masked robbers, a detective is hired to find the surviving killer as well as the prospector's legal inheritors.

== Cast ==
- Jock Mahoney as 'Silver' Ward Hogan
- Kim Hunter as Mary Johnston Kingman
- Tim Hovey as Davy Kingman
- Gene Evans as Sheriff Abner Crowley
- Tom Drake as Jess Ryerson
- Lon Chaney Jr. as Art Birdwell
- William Campbell as Clinton Gunston
- Jeffrey Stone as Johnny Bee
- James Gleason as Henry Devers
- Judi Meredith as Sally Gunston
- Phillip Terry as Damian Bard
- Richard Devon as Setting Sun
- Ian MacDonald as Nibbs
- Don Megowan as John Briggs

== Production notes ==
According to the AFI Catalog, although it was filmed in September 1957, its release was delayed for over a year. The song, "Lonely Is The Hunter," written and performed during the opening credits by Jimmy Wakely, suggests that it may have been a working title, and the final one a last-minute change—and a somewhat inaccurate one, as there are only two women in the film and neither has a significant role.

The following year, Pittman and Horwitz were reunited on the television series 77 Sunset Strip.

The film is noteworthy as Chaney's last film for the studio that helped make him a star 17 years earlier.
