= Backlash (1956 film) =

American Western starring Richard Widmark

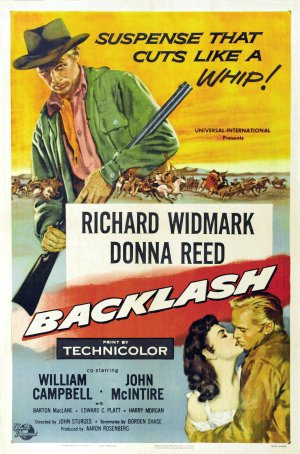
- Film poster by Reynold Brown
- Directed by: John Sturges
- Screenplay by: Borden Chase
- Based on: Fort Starvation; 1953 novel by Frank Gruber
- Produced by: Aaron Rosenberg
- Starring: Richard Widmark; Donna Reed; William Campbell; John McIntire
- Cinematography: Irving Glassberg
- Edited by: Sherman Todd
- Music by: Herman Stein
- Color process: Technicolor
- Production company: Universal International Pictures
- Distributed by: Universal International Pictures
- Release date: April 11, 1956
- Running time: 84 minutes
- Country: United States
- Language: English
- Budget: $1,025,000
- Box office: $1.6 million (US)

Backlash is a 1956 American Western film directed by John Sturges and starring Richard Widmark, Donna Reed and William Campbell. It was produced and distributed by Universal Pictures.

It was directed by John Sturges (with whom Widmark would also make another Western The Law and Jake Wade) and unfolds in the vein of the psychological Western (a subgenre that has yielded many films, e.g. those of Anthony Mann, with whose films this bears comparison). It delivers an unconventional story, written by Borden Chase, that sometimes crosses into film noir, as a colorful cast of supporting characters help or hinder the protagonist during the unfolding of its central mystery. Backlash was filmed on location at Old Tucson Studios.

== Plot ==
Jim Slater meets Karyl Orton in Gila Valley, Arizona. She thinks that he is searching for a gold cache believed to be hidden somewhere in the valley. When a man with a rifle starts shooting at him, Jim wonders if she can be trusted. After Jim kills his foe, he discovers the dead man was a deputy sheriff from Silver City. He takes the body there.

When Sheriff J. C. Marson questions him, Jim reveals that he is after the person responsible for his father's death. Jim's father and four other men were besieged and killed by Apaches. Jim believes there was a sixth man who got away and could have gone for help, but instead decided he wanted the gold they found all to himself. Marston reveals that one of the men was the brother of the dead deputy. There are two other brothers, who will want revenge. When Jim refuses to leave town, Marston suggests he go see Sergeant George Lake in Tucson. Lake led the detail that found the massacre victims.

Jim takes his advice but finds Lake and his men under siege at an isolated trading post. Lake tells Karyl that only three of the bodies could be identified. While there, Karyl stakes her claim to the gold; her husband was another victim of Gila Valley. Lake and Jim sneak out that night and stampede the Apaches' horses, allowing the party to escape. Lake, however, is mortally wounded. Before he dies, he reveals they found a horse bearing the brand of Carson's outfit in Texas.

When Jim returns to Tucson, he encounters Karyl in a hotel, being forced upstairs by a stranger. Karyl calls him by name, whereupon the stranger draws his gun. Jim kills him and wounds another man gunning for him, though he is shot in the shoulder. Afterward, Karyl reveals that the dead man is Jeff Welker and the survivor is his brother Tony. Jim slaps her. She tracks him down, tends to his wound, and offers to trade information. Jim kisses her.

When the pair reach their destination, Major Carson tries to recruit Jim against Bonniwell, who has organized the local bandits. Jim is not interested in the upcoming range war, though he does learn that Bonniwell arrived in the region with $60,000, the same amount as the missing gold. One of Carson's gunmen, the black-clad, insolent Johnny Cool, informs Bonniwell of Carson's plans.

Bonniwell gathers his men in town, guns down Sheriff Olson when he tries to keep the peace, and prepares an ambush. He finds Jim locked in the jail. He lets the prisoner out when he learns who he is, then reveals that he is Jim's father, whom Jim had not seen since he was a child. The gold came, not from mining, but via robbery. The others forced Bonniwell out, only to run afoul of the Apaches, leaving him to collect the gold. Disillusioned, Jim wants nothing to do with his father.

Johnny Cool comes after Jim, who is unarmed. Cool asks Bonniwell to give Jim a gun, which he does. Jim outdraws and kills Cool.

Karyl pleads with Jim to leave immediately, but he wants to warn Carson. When he tries to fire a warning shot, he discovers that Bonniwell gave him back an unloaded gun. Bonniwell chases his son with a knife, but Jim manages to wrestle a gun from one of the bandits and fire. Alerted, Carson has his men surround the town, whereupon the bandits panic and flee. Bonniwell offers to step out of hiding and draw to see which Slater is faster, but he treacherously already has his gun in his hand. Carson's men ride in and fatally shoot him just before Jim steps out in the open. Bonniwell seems ready to say something to Jim, but dies beforehand. Jim and Karyl walk off together.

== Cast ==
- Richard Widmark as Jim Slater
- Donna Reed as Karyl Orton
- William Campbell as Johnny Cool
- John McIntire as Jim Bonniwell
- Barton MacLane as Sergeant Lake
- Harry Morgan as Tony Welker
- Robert J. Wilke as Jeff Welker
- Jack Lambert as Benton
- Roy Roberts as Major Carson
- Edward C. Platt as Sheriff Marson
- Robert Foulk as Sheriff Olson
- Phil Chambers as Dobbs
- Gregg Barton as Sleepy
- Fred Graham as Ned McCloud
- Frank Chase as Cassidy
- Norman Leavitt as Hotel Clerk
