= Tom Nolan (actor) =

Canadian-American film and television actor

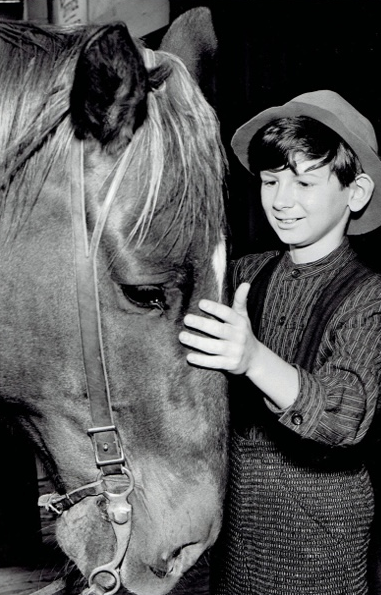
- Nolan in Buckskin, 1959
- Born: Maurice Joseph Girouard Jr. January 15, 1948 (age 78); Montreal, Quebec, Canada
- Occupations: Film and television actor
- Years active: 1952–1970

Maurice Joseph Girouard Jr. (born January 15, 1948) is a Canadian-American film and television actor. He is best known for playing Jody O'Connell in the American western television series Buckskin.

== Life and career ==
Nolan was born in Montreal, Quebec. He emigrated to the United States with his family, after his mother had health problems. Nolan attended at a stage school, at an early age for which he used the stage name Butch Bernard. He also attended Jen Loven Swim School. He began his screen career in 1952, where he played the uncredited role in the film Son of Paleface. He then appeared in films, such asf The Grasshopper, The Toy Tiger, The Seven Year Itch, Man Afraid, The Young Warriors, All Mine to Give, The Moonshine War, and Kiss Me, Stupid.

In 1958, Nolan starred in the NBC western television series Buckskin. He played the role of Jody O'Connell. His character was the son of Mrs. Annie O'Connell (Sally Brophy). After the series ended in 1959, he guest-starred in television programs, including, Gunsmoke, Bachelor Father, Rawhide, My Friend Flicka, Alfred Hitchcock Presents, The Rifleman, Lassie, The High Chaparral and Wagon Train.

Nolan retired from acting in 1970, last appearing in the film The Moonshine War. After retiring from acting, he worked as a writer.
