= The Looters (1955 film) =

1955 film by Abner Biberman

- Theatrical release poster
- Directed by: Abner Biberman
- Screenplay by: Richard Alan Simmons
- Story by: Paul Schneider
- Produced by: Howard Christie
- Starring: Rory Calhoun; Julie Adams; Ray Danton; Thomas Gomez; Frank Faylen; Russ Conway
- Cinematography: Lloyd Ahern Sr.
- Edited by: Russell F. Schoengarth
- Production company: Universal Pictures
- Distributed by: Universal Pictures
- Release date: May 1955
- Running time: 87 minutes
- Country: United States
- Language: English

The Looters is a 1955 American adventure film directed by Abner Biberman and written by Richard Alan Simmons. The film stars Rory Calhoun, Julie Adams, Ray Danton, Thomas Gomez, Frank Faylen and Russ Conway. The film was released in May 1955, by Universal Pictures.

== Plot ==
A group of plane crash survivors try to find refuge in the Rocky Mountains of Colorado. Two mercenaries, Peter and Jesse, set out on their trail with the intention of bringing them to safety. But Peter is lured by the belongings left in the plane and plans a real robbery against the survivors with final elimination of all witnesses.

== Cast ==
- Rory Calhoun as Jesse Hill
- Julie Adams as Sheryl Gregory
- Ray Danton as Pete Corder
- Thomas Gomez as George Parkinson
- Frank Faylen as Stan Leppich
- Russ Conway as Maj. Knowles
- John Stephenson as Lt. Jerry Stevenson
- Rod Williams as Co-pilot
