= Day of the Badman =

1958 film by Harry Keller

- Film poster
- Directed by: Harry Keller
- Screenplay by: Lawrence Roman
- Story by: John W. Cunningham
- Produced by: Gordon Kay
- Starring: Fred MacMurray; Joan Weldon; John Ericson
- Cinematography: Irving Glassberg
- Edited by: Sherman Todd
- Music by: Hans J. Salter
- Color process: Eastmancolor
- Production company: Universal Pictures
- Distributed by: Universal Pictures
- Release dates: January 29, 1958 (New York City); February 5, 1958 (Los Angeles)
- Running time: 81 minutes
- Country: United States
- Language: English

Day of the Badman (shown as Day of the Bad Man on the film's title screen) is a 1958 American Western film directed by Harry Keller and starring Fred MacMurray, Joan Weldon and John Ericson.

== Plot ==
Judge Jim Scott wants to sentence a killer to die, but the outlaw's family, including patriarch Charlie Hayes, resort to violence to save his life. Although sheriff Barney Wiley and most of the townsmen fear the Hayes family, Scott is determined to exact his cruel form of justice. Scott's life becomes even more complicated when he learns that his fiancée Myra has fallen in love with Wiley.

== Cast ==
- Fred MacMurray as Judge Jim Scott
- Joan Weldon as Myra Owens
- John Ericson as Sheriff Barney Wiley
- Robert Middleton as Charlie Hayes
- Marie Windsor as Cora Johnson
- Edgar Buchanan as Sam Wyckoff
- Eduard Franz as Andrew Owens
- Skip Homeier as Howard Hayes
- Peggy Converse as Mrs. Quary
- Robert Foulk as Silas Mordigan
- Ann Doran as Martha Mordigan
- Lee Van Cleef as Jake Hayes
- Eddy Waller as Mr. Slocum
- Christopher Dark as Rudy Hayes
- Don Haggerty as Deputy Floyd
- Chris Alcaide as Monte Hayes
- Tom London as Roy (uncredited)

== Reception ==
In a contemporary review for The New York Times, critic Howard Thompson wrote: "Neither the scenario nor Harry Keller's direction add anything new to the square-cut grimness of the picture, produced by Gordon Kay. The most telling contributions come from the good, colorful little cast ... Now for a change, how about a Western where the whole town tries to make a cowardly sheriff (or judge) do his duty?"

== See also ==
- List of American films of 1958
