= Man Afraid =

1957 film by Harry Keller

- Directed by: Harry Keller
- Written by: Herb Meadow
- Story by: Daniel B. Ullman
- Produced by: Gordon Kay
- Starring: George Nader; Phyllis Thaxter; Tim Hovey
- Cinematography: Russell Metty
- Edited by: Ted J. Kent
- Music by: Henry Mancini
- Production company: Universal Pictures
- Distributed by: Universal Pictures
- Release date: April 4, 1957
- Running time: 84 minutes
- Country: United States
- Language: English

Man Afraid is a 1957 American film noir directed by Harry Keller and starring George Nader, Phyllis Thaxter and Tim Hovey.

== Plot ==
A minister (George Nader) accidentally kills a young burglar. The father of the burglar (Eduard Franz) sets out to avenge his son's death by threatening the minister's son.

== Cast ==
- George Nader as Rev. David Collins
- Phyllis Thaxter as Lisa Collins
- Tim Hovey as Michael Collins
- Eduard Franz as Carl Simmons
- Harold J. Stone as Lieutenant Marlin
- Judson Pratt as Wilbur Fletcher
- Reta Shaw as Nurse Willis
- Tom Nolan as Ronnie 'Skunky' Fletcher
- Mabel Albertson as Maggie
- Martin Milner as Shep Hamilton
- Troy Donahue as reporter

== See also ==
- List of American films of 1957
