= Everything but the Truth =

1956 film by Jerry Hopper

- Directed by: Jerry Hopper
- Screenplay by: Herb Meadow
- Story by: Sheridan Gibney; Stanley Roberts
- Produced by: Howard Christie
- Starring: Maureen O'Hara; John Forsythe; Tim Hovey
- Cinematography: Maury Gertsman
- Edited by: Sherman Todd
- Music by: Milton Rosen; Irving Gertz; Henry Mancini
- Production company: Universal Pictures
- Distributed by: Universal Pictures
- Release date: December 1, 1956
- Running time: 83 minutes
- Country: United States
- Language: English

Everything but the Truth is a 1956 American Eastmancolor comedy film directed by Jerry Hopper and starring Maureen O'Hara, John Forsythe and Tim Hovey. Much of the film score was composed by Henry Mancini. It was produced and distributed by Universal Pictures.

== Plot ==
A schoolboy who has been urged to always tell the truth blurts out that an uncle of his has received a payoff from a politician. Chaos ensues, as teacher Joan Madison fights the school principal's decision to expel the boy from classes and enlists a newspaper columnist, Ernie Miller, to help support her cause.

== Cast ==
- Maureen O'Hara as Joan Madison
- John Forsythe as Ernie Miller
- Tim Hovey as Willie Taylor
- Frank Faylen as Mac MCmillen
- Les Tremayne as Lawrence "Larry" Everett
- Philip Bourneuf as Mayor Benjamin 'Ben' Parker
- Jeanette Nolan as Miss Adelaide Dabney
- Paul Birch as Sen. Winter
- Addison Richards as Roger Connolly
- Barry Atwater as Arthur Taylor
- Roxanne Arlen as Blonde in Washroom
- Ray Walker as Doctor
- Howard Negley as Fred - School Board Chairman
- Dorothy Abbott as Hostess
- Philo McCullough as Senator

== Bibliography ==
- Caps, John. Henry Mancini: Reinventing Film Music. University of Illinois Press, 2012.
- Malone, Aubrey. Maureen O'Hara: The Biography. University Press of Kentucky, 2013.
