= The Square Jungle =

1955 film by Jerry Hopper

- Film poster by Reynold Brown
- Directed by: Jerry Hopper
- Written by: George Zuckerman
- Produced by: Albert Zugsmith
- Starring: Tony Curtis; Patricia Crowley; Ernest Borgnine
- Cinematography: George Robinson
- Edited by: Paul Weatherwax
- Music by: Heinz Roemheld
- Production company: Universal Pictures
- Distributed by: Universal Pictures
- Release date: December 30, 1955 (New York City)
- Running time: 86 minutes
- Country: United States
- Language: English
- Box office: $1 million

The Square Jungle is a 1955 American film noir drama sport film directed by Jerry Hopper and starring Tony Curtis, Pat Crowley and Ernest Borgnine.

Former heavyweight champion of the world Joe Louis appears as himself.

== Plot ==
Pat Quaid, an alcoholic San Francisco widower, ends up in jail. His grocery-clerk son, Eddie, needs $25 to bail him out. When he can't borrow it, Eddie enters an amateur fight contest and wins it.

Julie Walsh is in love with Eddie, but her father disapproves of the Quaid family, particularly the boy's father, so he makes Julie stay away. Pat Quaid, once a promising prizefighter, urges his son to give it a try professionally. Eddie agrees on the condition that Pat quit drinking.

Eddie decides to adopt his dad's old ring name, Packy Glennon. To train him, the Quaids go to Bernie Browne, who also has had a problem with booze. Bernie's work with Eddie eventually leads to a fight with Al Gorski for the middleweight championship. Julie shows up, but Eddie angrily dismisses her. Pat explains that Julie's dad has recently committed suicide. Eddie chases after her.

Eddie wins the fight and becomes increasingly arrogant. He trains lazily for the rematch with Gorski and is beaten badly. A referee's decision to stop the fight might have saved Eddie from permanent damage or death, but instead of being grateful, Eddie complains publicly that Tommy Dillon stopped it too soon and should be banned as a referee.

In a third and final bout, Eddie beats Gorski mercilessly. Dillon, the ref, doesn't stop it this time. The crowd jeers Eddie when he leaves the ring as Gorski lies unconscious. A depressed Eddie goes on an alcoholic bender with another woman at a motel. He feels "dead inside," but when Julie is able to get him back to a boxing arena, Eddie finds that Gorski and the spectators all have forgiven him.

== Cast ==
- Tony Curtis as Eddie Quaid/Packy Glennon
- Patricia Crowley as Julie (credited as Pat Crowley)
- Ernest Borgnine as Bernie Browne
- Paul Kelly as Jim McBride
- Jim Backus as Pat Quaid
- Lee Snowden as Lorraine Evans
- John Daheim as Al Gorski (as John Day)
- John Marley as Tommy Dillon
- Joe Louis as himself
- David Janssen as Jack
- Carmen McRae as Singer
- Barney Phillips as Dan Selby
- Joseph Vitale as Tony Adamson (as Joe Vitale)
- Kay Stewart as Mrs. Gorski

== See also ==
- List of American films of 1955
- List of boxing films
