= The Toy Tiger =

1956 film by Jerry Hopper

- Directed by: Jerry Hopper
- Written by: Ted Sherdeman
- Story by: Marcella Burke; Frederick Kohner
- Produced by: Howard Christie
- Starring: Jeff Chandler; Laraine Day; Tim Hovey
- Cinematography: George Robinson
- Edited by: Milton Carruth
- Music by: Henry Mancini (uncredited); Herman Stein (uncredited); Stanley Wilson (uncredited)
- Production company: Universal-International Pictures
- Distributed by: Universal-International Pictures
- Release date: June 29, 1956 (United States)
- Running time: 88 mins.
- Country: United States
- Language: English
- Box office: $1.4 million (US rentals)

The Toy Tiger is a 1956 American comedy film directed by Jerry Hopper and starring Laraine Day and Jeff Chandler. It is a remake of Mad About Music (1938).

== Plot ==
New York City advertising executive Gwen Harkinson is a widow with a son, Timmy, who lives full-time in an upstate boarding school. She sends art director Rick Todd in that direction to try to rehire Mike Wyman, a former creative talent for the ad agency who has given up that life to become a sculptor.

At school, Timmy has been lying to classmates that his father is not only alive but a famous big-game hunter and explorer. Many doubt him. Timmy compounds his tall tale by insisting his father's on his way for a visit this very minute. When he sees Rick arrive in town, he pretends that's his Dad.

Rick ignores him until his assistant Larry Tripps meets the boy and accuses Rick of abandoning his own child. A puzzled Rick confronts young Timmy and insists he reveal the truth, but at the last minute, Rick can't bring himself to see the kid humiliated.

Mike not only refuses to return to advertising but inspires aspiring painter Rick to follow in his footsteps. Rick also goes camping with the students and pretends to be a great outdoorsman. Gwen visits and goes into a panic when told by the Fusenots, who run the school, that Timmy's off with his "father."

Once the confusion is worked out, Rick announces his intention to quit. Gwen, however, suddenly realizes that right in front of her eyes all along has been a perfect husband for her and father for her son.

== Cast ==
- Laraine Day as Gwen
- Jeff Chandler as Rick
- Tim Hovey as Timmy
- Richard Haydn as John Fusenot
- Cecil Kellaway as James Fusenot
- Judson Pratt as Mike
- David Janssen as Larry
- Robert Anderson as State Trooper

== Production ==
Filming started 15 November 1955.

== See also ==
- List of American films of 1956
