= Herman Stein =

American composer

Herman Stein (August 19, 1915 – March 15, 2007) was an American composer who wrote music for many of the 1950s science-fiction and horror films from Universal Studios. "Herman Stein was one of the architects of the sound of 1950s science-fiction movies." Stein retired in the 1970s and died of congestive heart failure in his home in Los Angeles at the age of 91.

== Life ==
Born in Philadelphia, Pennsylvania, Stein was a child prodigy, playing the piano by the age of three and making his professional concert debut at the age of six. He worked as a jazz composer and arranger for radio programs and big bands in the 1930s and early 1940s. He served in the army in World War II and moved to Hollywood in 1948, studying with the Italian composer Mario Castelnuovo-Tedesco. Subsequently, in 1951, he was hired by Universal Studios, where he scored the music for about 200 films. His name was seldom in the movie credits because of the studio's tendency to give solo credit to the music supervisor. Nonetheless, he either wrote the main themes, from which he and his colleagues worked, or, equally important, wrote the opening music, which often sets the tone for the film itself. In 1950, Stein married Anita Shervin who played a viola with the Los Angeles Philharmonic. Later he left Universal and composed music for television.

== Music ==
In 1932, aged just sixteen, Stein sold a jazz arrangement of The Song of the Volga Boatmen to bandleader Alex Bartha, who recorded it under the name "Red Blues." He also was co-composer/arranger of 'Line-a-Jive," recorded in 1935 by the Blanche Calloway band.

Stein composed the eerie music for, among others, the sci-fi and horror movies It Came From Outer Space, Revenge of the Creature and This Island Earth. Despite longstanding claims, he did not write music for the American version of Toho's King Kong vs. Godzilla. The suspect music heard in that film was composed by fellow Universal-International writer Hans J. Salter for Creature from the Black Lagoon, and those original music tracks were re-used in the U. S. release of the Japanese picture. Some of his music, however, was used in the film's theatrical trailer. In addition to horror films, Stein wrote for westerns, dramas and comedies, including the Audie Murphy western Drums Across the River and Roger Corman's civil rights drama The Intruder. His television work included such shows as The Life and Legend of Wyatt Earp, Gunsmoke, Lost in Space and Daniel Boone.

Among Stein's compositions are a number that he wrote just for fun, such as The Sour Suite a tonal, cheery, and quite tongue-in-cheek piece for woodwind quintet.

In 2008, a classical piano piece he wrote in 1949 ("Suite for Mario") for his composition teacher, the esteemed Mario Castelnuovo-Tedesco, received its world-premiere recording.

== Selected filmography ==
- Girls in the Night (1953)
- It Happens Every Thursday (1953)
- It Came from Outer Space (1953)
- Drums Across the River (1954)
- The Far Country (1954)
- Revenge of the Creature (1955)
- This Island Earth (1955)
- Female on the Beach (1955)
- Backlash (1956)
- I've Lived Before (1956)
- The Great Man (1956)
- The Unguarded Moment (1956)
- Quantez (1957)
- The Land Unknown (1957)
- The Monolith Monsters (1957)
- No Name on the Bullet (1959)
- The Intruder (1962)
- Taggart (1964)
- Let's Kill Uncle (1966)
