= Bob Herron (stuntman) =

American actor (1924–2021)

- Born: Robert Herron; September 23, 1924; Lomita, California, U.S.
- Died: October 10, 2021 (aged 97); Thousand Oaks, California, U.S.
- Occupations: Stuntman, actor
- Years active: 1950–2011
- Spouse: Lynne
- Children: 4

Robert Herron (September 23, 1924 – October 10, 2021) was an American stuntman and actor, best known for performing stunts in hundreds of Hollywood films between 1950 and 2011.

Herron was born in Lomita, California in September 1924. He began his career in the early 1950s, appearing in films and television series as an actor and as a stunt performer. His work includes The Ten Commandments (1956), Rio Bravo (1959), Spartacus (1960), The Absent-Minded Professor (1961), The Wild Bunch (1969), Shaft (1971), Diamonds Are Forever (1971) and Rocky (1976).

He died from complications of a fall on October 10, 2021, at the age of 97.

== Filmography ==
=== Film ===
Year	Title	Role	Notes
1952	Cattle Town	Rider	Uncredited
1953	Invaders from Mars	Martian	Uncredited
1953	The Man from the Alamo		Uncredited
1953	Gun Fury	Curly Jordan	
1954	Saskatchewan	Brill	
1954	Magnificent Obsession	Taxi Driver	Uncredited
1954	Four Guns to the Border	Evans	
1955	The Man from Bitter Ridge	Jim Hanley	Uncredited
1955	The Far Horizons	Minor Role	Uncredited
1956	The Proud Ones	Cowboy	Uncredited
1956	The Rawhide Years	Barfly	Uncredited
1956	Away All Boats	Sailor	Uncredited
1956	The Burning Hills	Faber	Uncredited
1956	Pillars of the Sky	Trooper	Uncredited
1956	The Ten Commandments	Courier	Uncredited
1956	The Mole People	Mole Person	Uncredited
1957	The Big Land	Texan	Uncredited
1957	Man Afraid	Frankie Simmons - Burglar	Uncredited
1958	Westbound	Henchman	Uncredited
1958	Born Reckless	Cowboy	Uncredited
1960	The Rise and Fall of Legs Diamond	Thug	Uncredited
1960	Seven Ways from Sundown	Waggoner	Uncredited
1960	Spartacus	Minor Role	Uncredited
1960	The Great Impostor	Highway Patrol Officer	Uncredited
1963	The Slime People	Slime Person	Uncredited
1963	Gunfight at Comanche Creek	Agent	Uncredited
1965	The Great Race	Palace Guard	Uncredited
1969	A Time for Dying	Rankin	
1970	There Was a Crooked Man...	Oran	Uncredited
1971	Dollars	Bodyguard	
1973	Oklahoma Crude	Dulling	
1974	Bank Shot	Bank Guard	Uncredited
1974	Black Samson	Nappa's Gang #5	
1977	Mr. Billion	Moose - Bodyguard	
1977	The Domino Principle	Brookshire	
1977	Local Color	Fred	
1978	The Fifth Floor	Sheriff	
1978	Movie Movie	Hood #2; Mover #1	(segment "Dynamite Hands") (segment "Baxter's Beauties of 1933")
1984	City Heat	Garage Soldier #5	
1988	The Seventh Sign	Jimmy's Guard #1	
1988	Betrayed	Bank Guard	
1988	The Naked Gun	Dr. Alford	Uncredited
1989	Grave Secrets	Kurt Norwood	
1994	True Lies	Hotel Guest	Uncredited

=== Television ===
Year	Title	Role	Notes	Ref.
1965	Star Trek: The Original Series	Stunt Double for Jeffrey Hunter	Pilot: "The Cage"	
1966	Star Trek: The Original Series	Sam	S1:E2: "Charlie X"	
1966	Star Trek: The Original Series	Stunt Double for Jeffrey Hunter	S1:E12: "The Menagerie"	
1969	Star Trek: The Original Series	Kahless	S3:E22: "The Savage Curtain"	
