= Zigzag (1963 film) =

- Directed by: Ronald Remy
- Produced by: Albert Zugsmith
- Starring: George Nader
- Production company: Medallion Pictures
- Release date: 1963
- Country: United States
- Language: English

Zigzag is a 1963 film directed by Ronald Remy and starring George Nader. Produced by Albert Zugsmith, it was made in the Philippines.

== Cast ==
- George Nader as The Blind Hunter
- Sylvia Lawrence as Sylvia Lawrence

== Production ==
Filming took place in the Philippines in May 1963. It was the first of a five-picture deal Nader signed with Medallion Pictures. He was meant to follow it with Walk by the Sea, directed by himself, in Hong Kong. Nader had previously made The Great Space Adventure for producer Albert Zugsmith in the Philippines.
