= George Nader =

American actor and writer (1921–2002)

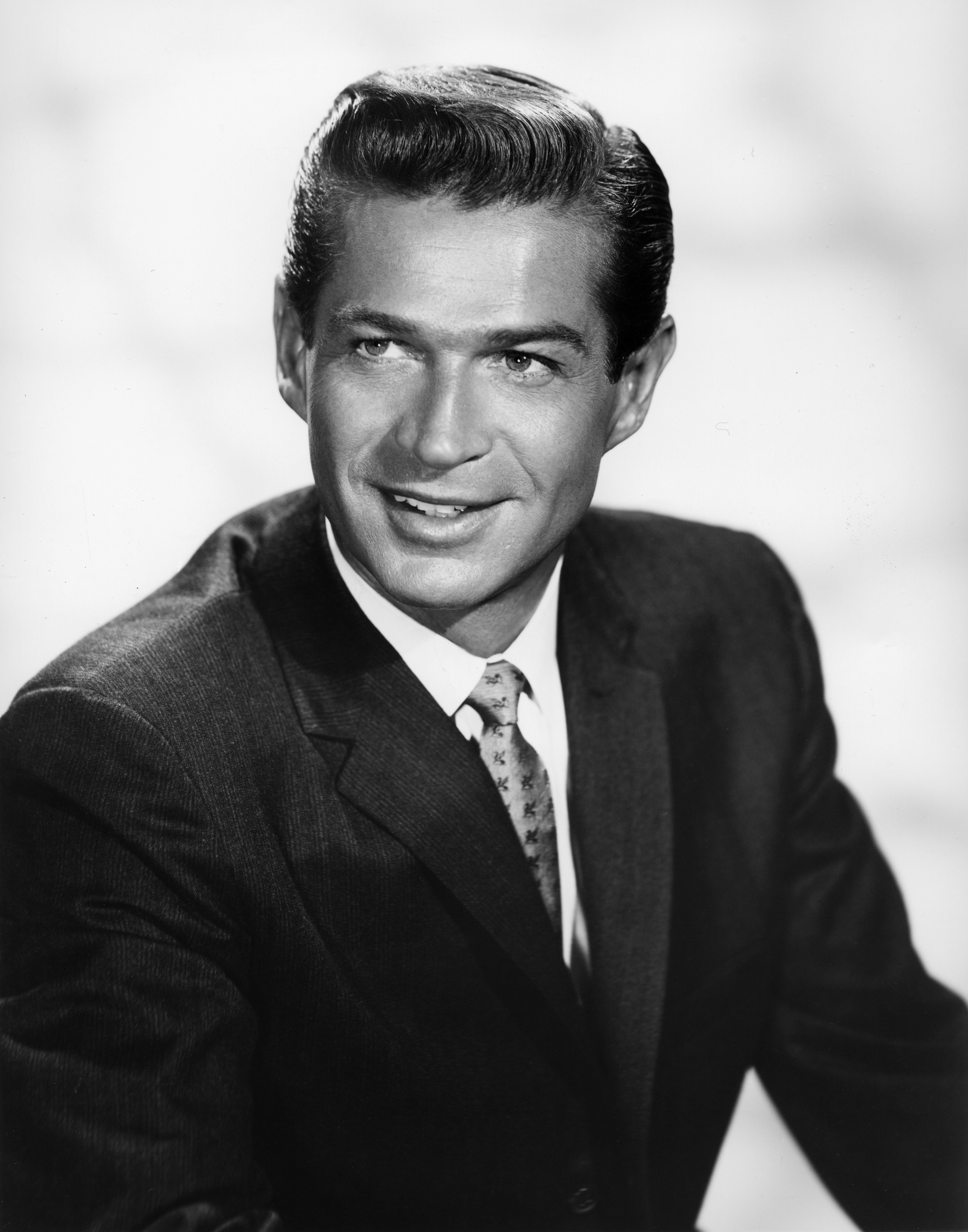
- Nader, circa 1960
- Born: George Garfield Nader, Jr. October 19, 1921; Pasadena, California, U.S.
- Died: February 4, 2002 (aged 80); Woodland Hills, California, U.S.
- Occupations: Actor; writer
- Years active: 1950–1974
- Partner: Mark Miller (1947–2002; Nader's death)
- Relatives: Michael Nader (nephew)
- Awards: Golden Globe Award for New Star of the Year – Actor 1954

George Garfield Nader Jr. (October 19, 1921 – February 4, 2002) was an American actor and writer. He appeared in a variety of films from 1950 to 1974, mainly action and adventure film roles, and had a long stint as a leading man at Universal Studios. He won the Golden Globe Award for New Star of the Year – Actor for the film Four Guns to the Border (1954).

During this period, he also did episodic television and starred in several series, including NBC's The Man and the Challenge (1959–60). In the 1960s he made several films in West Germany, playing FBI agent Jerry Cotton. He is also remembered for his first starring role, in the low-budget 3-D sci-fi film Robot Monster (1953), known as "one of the worst films ever made".

Discreetly gay during his acting career, he and his life partner Mark Miller were among Rock Hudson's closest friends. After retiring from acting, he wrote Chrome (1978), a science-fiction novel dealing positively with a same-sex relationship.

== Early life ==
Nader was born in Pasadena, California, the son of Alice (née Scott), who was from Kansas, and George Garfield Nader, who was from Illinois. His father was of Lebanese descent. He earned his Bachelor of Arts in theater arts at Occidental College.

During World War II, he served in the U.S. Navy as a communications officer in the Pacific Theater from 1943 to 1946.

== Career ==
=== Early career ===
Nader began his acting career in 1950. He appeared in several productions at the Pasadena Playhouse over four years, which led to a number of bit parts in films. He was in Rustlers on Horseback (1950) for Republic Pictures while also appearing on stage in Summer and Smoke at the Pasadena Playhouse.

He had small parts in You're in the Navy Now (1951), The Prowler (1951), Take Care of My Little Girl (1951), The Desert Fox: The Story of Rommel (1951), and Two Tickets to Broadway (1951). He had a bigger part in a Tim Holt Western, Overland Telegraph (1951), and a drama, Monsoon (1952). He was going to star in a film called GI Smith, but production was canceled. He had unbilled bit roles in the studio films Phone Call from a Stranger (1951) and Down Among the Sheltering Palms (1952).

=== Leading man ===
Nader's first starring role was in Robot Monster (1953), a 3-D feature film directed by Phil Tucker. Although the film is remembered primarily for its "camp" attributes as "one of the worst films ever made," it was financially successful and led to more prominent roles for Nader in other films. He supported Paulette Goddard in Sins of Jezebel (1953) and had a supporting role in Carnival Story (1954). He was the male love interest for Miss Robin Crusoe (1954) at Fox.

Meanwhile, Nader appeared regularly on TV shows such as Schlitz Playhouse of Stars, Hallmark Hall of Fame, Letter to Loretta, Cavalcade of America, Lux Video Theatre, and The Pepsi-Cola Playhouse.

=== Universal Pictures ===
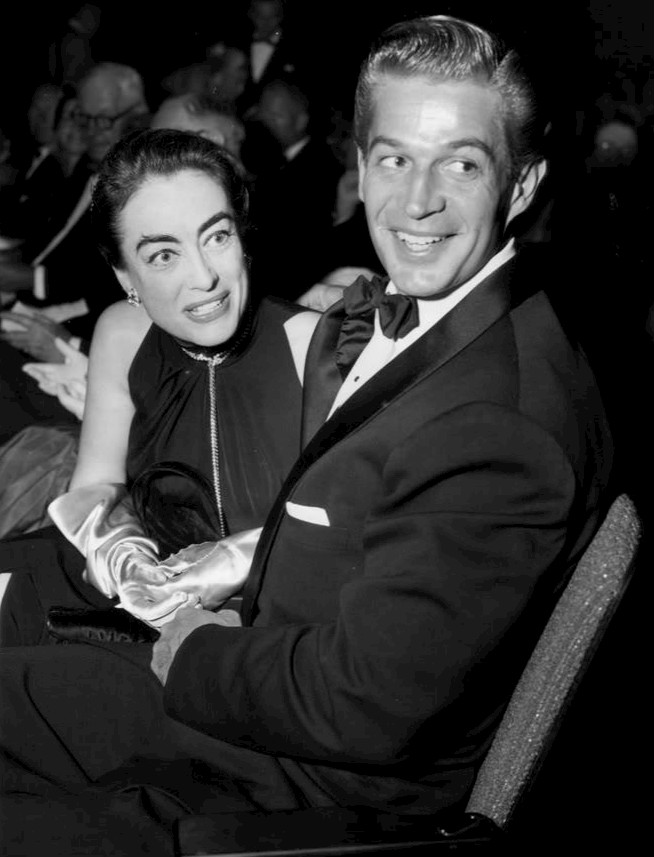
Nader with Joan Crawford (1954)

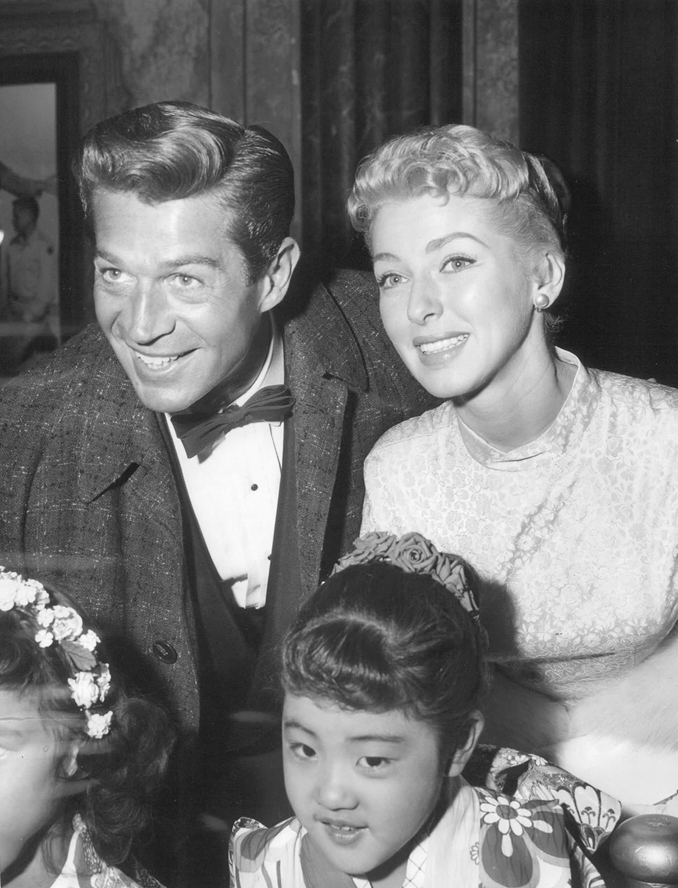
Nader with Dani Crayne (1956)

He made a number of films for Universal Studios, alongside leading men such as Rock Hudson, Tony Curtis, and Jeff Chandler. His first film for Universal was a Western, Four Guns to the Border (1954), wherein he was billed beneath Rory Calhoun and Colleen Miller. He followed it with Six Bridges to Cross (1955), supporting Tony Curtis and Julie Adams in a role that Chandler had refused.

Nader was promoted to lead in The Second Greatest Sex (1955) opposite Jeanne Crain and in Lady Godiva of Coventry (1955) opposite Maureen O'Hara, stepping in for Chandler again. In 1955, he won a Golden Globe Award for "Most Promising Newcomer".

He starred opposite Virginia Mayo in Congo Crossing (1956) and was second-billed to Chandler in Universal's expensive war epic Away All Boats (1956). He was Esther Williams's leading man in The Unguarded Moment (1956), which starred a young John Saxon. He had top billing in Four Girls in Town (1957) and Man Afraid (1957). Nader supported Audie Murphy in Joe Butterfly (1957), a military comedy. He had the lead in Appointment with a Shadow (1958) and Flood Tide (1958). He was Hedy Lamarr's love interest in The Female Animal (1958), replacing John Gavin. He had the starring role in Nowhere to Go, a 1958 British crime drama featuring the screen debut of Maggie Smith.

=== Television ===
Nader moved into regular television roles in the late 1950s, appearing in several short-lived series, including The Further Adventures of Ellery Queen (1959) and The Man and the Challenge (1959–60). In 1961, he appeared in an Alfred Hitchcock Presents episode "Self Defense," with Audrey Totter; the following year, he returned for the "Where Beauty Lies" episode opposite Cloris Leachman. In the 1961–62 season, he appeared as insurance investigator Joe Shannon in the syndicated crime drama Shannon, co-starring with Regis Toomey.

Nader appeared frequently on The Loretta Young Show, a dramatic anthology series on NBC.

He produced and directed Walk by the Sea (1963).

=== International ===
Nader had the title role in a European swashbuckler, The Secret Mark of D'Artagnan (1963). He made Zigzag (1963) and The Great Space Adventure (1964) for Albert Zugsmith; both films were made in the Philippines. He starred in The Human Duplicators (1965) and regularly guest-starred on TV shows.

Nader went to Germany to star as FBI agent Jerry Cotton in the German film Tread Softly (1965). It was a hit and led to a series of films: Manhattan Night of Murder (1965), Tip Not Included (1966), The Trap Snaps Shut at Midnight (1966), Murderers Club of Brooklyn (1967), Death in the Red Jaguar (1968), Death and Diamonds (1968), and Dead Body on Broadway (1969).

He appeared in two Harry Alan Towers productions, The Million Eyes of Sumuru (1967) shot in Hong Kong and The House of 1,000 Dolls (1967) filmed in Spain. One of his last films was Beyond Atlantis (1973), made in the Philippines.

=== Writing ===
In the 1970s, Nader suffered an eye injury in an automobile accident, which made him particularly sensitive to the bright lights of movie sets and forced him to retire from acting. He began writing, including his 1978 science fiction novel Chrome, which was about a forbidden gay romance between a man and an android.

According to Variety's Army Archerd, Nader had completed a book called The Perils of Paul (the title being a play on the melodrama serial The Perils of Pauline) about the gay community in Hollywood, which he did not want published until after his death.

== Personal life ==
Although Nader was not openly gay during his film career, he generally did not feign relationships with women to conceal it, instead deflecting questions by saying that he had not met "the right one".

Nader lived with his life partner, Mark Miller (November 22, 1926 – June 9, 2015), whom he met in 1947 while they were acting in a play together.

Miller worked as Rock Hudson's personal secretary from 1972 until the star's death, and Nader was the sole inheritor of the interest from Hudson's $27 million estate after his death from AIDS complications in 1985. Hudson biographer Sara Davidson described Nader, Miller, and another person as "Rock's family for most of his adult life". Nader publicly acknowledged his sexual orientation shortly afterward.

Nader and Miller eventually settled in Palm Springs.

== Death ==
Stricken by multiple health problems, Nader was hospitalized in September 2001. He died on February 4, 2002, in Woodland Hills, California, of cardiopulmonary failure, pneumonia, and multiple cerebral infarctions. He was survived by Miller (with whom he had spent 55 years), his cousins Sally Kubly and Roberta Cavell, and his nephew, actor Michael Nader. His ashes were scattered at sea; a cenotaph in his honor, together with Mark Miller and Rock Hudson, exists in Cathedral City's Forest Lawn Cemetery. In 2002, a Golden Palm Star on the Palm Springs, California, Walk of Stars was dedicated to him.

Writing for FilmInk, Stephen Vagg argued that Nader was "a solid, reliable performer whose acting never got its due, in part because he wasn't that great, but mostly because he appeared in so many programmers. One looks over his filmography and the most unusual credit is Robot Monster, followed by Nowhere to Go and… that's about it. His films weren't bad, they just weren't that interesting – like Nader himself really."

== Filmography ==
=== Film ===
Year	Title	Role	Notes
1950	Rustlers on Horseback	Jack Reynolds	Credited as George Nadar
1951	You're in the Navy Now	Crew member	Uncredited
1951	The Prowler	Photographer	Uncredited
1951	Take Care of My Little Girl	Jack Gruber	Uncredited
1951	The Desert Fox: The Story of Rommel	Commando	Uncredited
1951	Two Tickets to Broadway	Charlie	Uncredited
1951	Overland Telegraph	Paul Manning	
1952	Phone Call from a Stranger	Pilot	Uncredited
1952	Monsoon	Burton	
1952	Han glömde henne aldrig	Chris Kingsley (voice)	English dub, dubbed Sven Lindberg
1953	Down Among the Sheltering Palms	Lt. Homer Briggs	Uncredited
1953	Robot Monster	Roy	
1953	Sins of Jezebel	Jehu	
1954	Carnival Story	Bill Vines	
1954	Four Guns to the Border	Bronco	
1954	Miss Robin Crusoe	Jonathan	
1955	Six Bridges to Cross	Edward Gallagher	
1955	The Second Greatest Sex	Matt Davis	
1955	Lady Godiva of Coventry	Lord Leofric	
1956	Congo Crossing	David Carr	
1956	Away All Boats	Lieutenant Dave MacDougall	
1956	The Unguarded Moment	Lieutenant Harry Graham	
1957	Four Girls in Town	Mike Snowden	
1957	Man Afraid	Reverend David Collins	
1957	Joe Butterfly	Sergeant Ed Kennedy	
1957	Appointment with a Shadow	Paul Baxter	
1957	Flood Tide	Steve Martin	
1958	The Female Animal	Chris Farley	
1958	Nowhere to Go	Paul Gregory	
1962	The Secret Mark of D'Artagnan	d'Artagnan	
1963	Zigzag	The Hunter	
1963	The Great Space Adventure		
1963	A Walk by the Sea		
1965	The Human Duplicators	Glenn Martin	
1965	Schüsse aus dem Geigengasten	Jerry Cotton	
1965	Espionage in Lisbon	Drunk entering hotel room	Uncredited cameo
1965	Manhattan Night of Murder	Jerry Cotton	
1966	The Trap Snaps Shut at Midnight	Jerry Cotton	
1966	Die Rechnung – eiskalt serviert	Jerry Cotton	
1967	Der Mörderclub von Brooklyn	Jerry Cotton	
1967	The Million Eyes of Sumuru	Agent Nick West	
1967	The House of 1,000 Dolls	Stephen Armstrong	
1968	Dynamit in grüner Seide	Jerry Cotton	
1968	Radhapura – Endstation der Verdammten	Steve Weston	
1968	Tod im Roten Jaguar	Jerry Cotton	
1969	Todesschüsse am Broadway	Jerry Cotton	
1973	Beyond Atlantis	Nereus	

=== Television ===
Year	Title	Role	Notes
1950–1953	Fireside Theater	George; Mick; Charlie; Bob; Web Martin	Season 2 Episode 18: "The Golden Ball/Just Three Words" (1950) as George Season 5 Episode 17: "The Lady Wears a Star" (1953) as Mick Season 5 Episode 20: "Boundary Line" (1953) as Charlie Season 6 Episode 6: "Refuge" (1953) as Bob Season 6 Episode 12: "Appointment with Death" (1953) as Web Martin
1952	Gruen Guild Playhouse		1 episode
1952	Big Town		Season 2 Episode 38: "Baby Sitter"
1953	Your Jeweler's Showcase		Season 1 Episode 18: "Heart's Desire"
1953	Schlitz Playhouse of Stars	Richard MacLeod	Season 2 Episode 44: "Richard and the Lion"
1953	Your Play Time		TV, 1 episode
1953	Hallmark Hall of Fame	Joseph McCoy	(TV movie) "McCoy of Abilene"
1953–1961	The Loretta Young Show	(1) Keith Warren (2) Arthur Wayne (3) Steve Baxter (4) Newton Ralston (5) Robert Schumann (6) Charles Diebold (7) Barry Kendall (8) Austin Granger	Season 1 Episode 1: "Trial Run" (1953) as (1) Season 1 Episode 2: "The Mirror" (1953) as (2) Season 1 Episode 8: "Kid Stuff" (1953) as (3) Season 1 Episode 15: "Hotel Irritant" (1953) as (4) Season 1 Episode 26: "The Clara Schumann Story" (1954) as (5) Season 1 Episode 31: "The Enchanted Schoolteacher" (1954) as (6) Season 1 Episode 33: "Oh, My Aching Heart" (1954) as (7) Season 8 Episode 20: "The Choice" (1961) as (8)
1954	The Pepsi-Cola Playhouse	Bill Ferris	Season 1 Episode 16: "Account Closed" as Bill Ferris Season 1 Episode 22: "His Brother's Girl"
1954	Cavalcade of America	Eliphalet Remington II	Season 2 Episode 30: "Midnight School" Season 3 Episode 3: "The Forge" as Eliphalet Remington II
1954–1957	Lux Video Theatre	Jeremy; Don; Dr. Frank Matson	Season 5 Episode 9: "An Angel Went AWOL" (1954) as Jeremy Season 7 Episode 9: "The Glass Web" (1956) as Don Season 7 Episode 22: "One Way Street" (1957) as Dr. Frank Matson
1957	Climax!	Harry Parker	Season 3 Episode 41: "The Stranger Within"
1959	The Further Adventures of Ellery Queen	Ellery Queen	TV, 25 episodes
1959–1960	The Man and the Challenge	Dr. Glenn Barton	TV, 36 episodes
1960	Laramie	Wells Clark	Season 2 Episode 8: ".45 Caliber"
1961	The Andy Griffith Show	Dr. Robert Benson	Season 1 Episode 24: "The New Doctor"
1961	Shannon	Joe Shannon	TV, 36 episodes
1961	Alfred Hitchcock Presents	Gerald R. Clarke	Season 6 Episode 32: "Self Defense"
1962	Alfred Hitchcock Presents	Collin Hardy	Season 7 Episode 38: "Where Beauty Lies"
1965	Burke's Law	Chris Maitland	Season 2 Episode 30: "Who Killed the Jackpot"
1972	Owen Marshall: Counselor at Law		Season 1 Episode 15: "Warlock at Mach 3"
1972	The F.B.I.		Season 8 Episode 8: "A Game of Chess"
1974	Nakia	McMasters	TV movie, (final film role)
