= I Really Want to Know You =

1968 single by Jack Jones

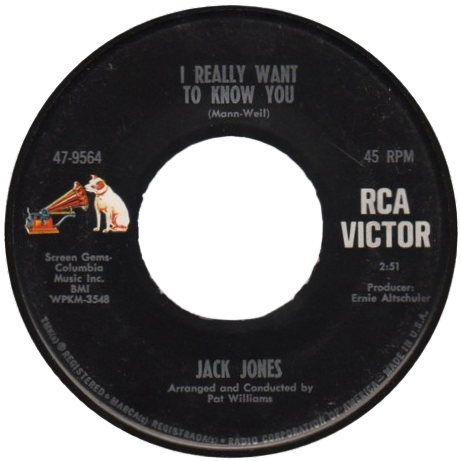
- A-side of the single

Single by Jack Jones

from the album Where Is Love?
- B-side: "This World Is Yours"
- Released: June 1968
- Recorded: Mid 1968
- Genre: Pop; Easy listening
- Length: 2:51
- Label: RCA Victor; 47-9564
- Songwriters: Barry Mann; Cynthia Weil
- Producer: Ernie Altschuler

Jack Jones singles chronology
"Follow Me" (1968)	"I Really Want to Know You" (1968)	"On My Word" (1968)

Professional ratings
Review scores
Source	Rating
Record World	4/5 stars
Billboard	Positive (Spotlight)
Cashbox	Positive (Pick of the Week)

"I Really Want to Know You" is a 1968 song written by Barry Mann and Cynthia Weil, and most notably performed by American singer and entertainer Jack Jones, who released the song as a single in June 1968. His version was the lead single for his Where Is Love? LP released in August 1968. Another version by The Partridge Family appeared on their highly successful pop album The Partridge Family Album two years later. It was recorded on May 16, 1970.

== Jack Jones version ==
=== Background ===
By 1968, Jones' chart performance had declined, but he still scored minor hits, and the main chart he had success with was the adult-oriented Easy Listening chart. The new single followed "Follow Me", which reached adult-oriented No. 20 on the charts and No. 117 on pop charts. "I Really Want to Know You" was the fourth of eight singles that he released that year. It was produced by Ernie Altschuler and arranged by Pat Williams, as on his previous single. It was featured on his album released two months later, Where Is Love?. By this time, Jones had been recording with RCA Victor for nearly a year, although Kapp would reissue some of Jones' material later as well.

=== Release and reception ===
"I Really Want to Know You" was released as a seven-inch single in late June 1968 by RCA Victor Records. The track was recorded as a ballad. It was backed by an upcoming song from the Columbia pictures technicolor war-themed film Anzio, titled "This World Is Yours" on the B-side, which would not be included on the same LP as "I Really Want to Know You".

The single received a positive critical reception. Record World put the single in its "Four Stars" singles section, believing that "Buyers of all ages will really want to have this Mann-Weil ballad." They stated that "Jack does it just right." Cashbox chose it as a "pick" for adult stations, and said that it's a "Particularly tempting side from Jack Jones gains listener curiosity from the start by juxtaposing snappy folk-country flavored guitar work in the slower framework of the Mann-Weil ballad." The publication noted that "Interplay on the volume levels gives a novel punch to the single, and the spectacular vocal performance make this a candidate for easy listening showcases and top forty sales." Billboard magazine reviewed the single on June 29, 1968, stating that "The fine voice of Jones, with top ballad material from Barry Mann and Cynthia Weil make this a top programmer with sales sure to follow."

=== Chart performance ===
The track did not appear on the Billboard Hot 100 chart, it reached the adult-oriented charts instead. It was ranked high on the Billboard Easy Listening survey, reaching number 15 during a nine-week run on it starting on July 13, 1968. "I Really Want to Know You" appeared on the Record World Top-Non Rock survey as well, reaching number 11 in August during a seven-week run on it.

=== Track listing ===
7" vinyl single

- "I Really Want to Know You" – 2:51
- "This World Is Yours" – 3:00

== Charts ==
Chart peaks for "I Really Want to Know You"
Chart (1968)	Peak position
US Billboard Easy Listening	15
US Record World Top Non-Rock	11
