= Appointment with a Shadow =

1957 film by Richard Carlson

- Theatrical release poster
- Directed by: Richard Carlson
- Written by: Alec Coppel; Norman Jolley
- Based on: story by Judson Philips (as Hugh Pentecost)
- Produced by: Howie Horwitz
- Starring: George Nader; Joanna Moore; Brian Keith; Virginia Field
- Cinematography: William E. Snyder
- Edited by: George A. Gittens
- Production company: Universal Pictures
- Distributed by: Universal Pictures
- Release date: September 1957 (United States)
- Running time: 72 minutes
- Country: United States
- Language: English

Appointment with a Shadow is a 1957 American CinemaScope crime film noir directed by Richard Carlson and starring George Nader, Joanna Moore, Brian Keith and Virginia Field.

== Plot ==
Alcoholic Paul Baxter has ruined his career as a reporter. After passing out in a bar, he is taken home by his friend, police lieutenant Spencer. Spencer's sister Penny is romantically involved with Baxter.

Penny has a tip on a story that could change Baxter's life, but she will reveal it only on the condition that Paul can last the day without drinking alcohol. Hung over and shaking, Paul takes the challenge.

Paul must be sober and alert for the expected arrival of the fugitive criminal Dutch Hayden at a restaurant. Spencer has information that Hayden has undergone plastic surgery to alter his appearance and is about to leave the country. Paul arrives at the restaurant in time but in rough shape; an accident has resulted in his clothing being soaked in liquor. Hayden arrives with his stripper girlfriend Flo Knapp, but just as Spencer's men shoot him dead, Paul spots the real Hayden, whose face has not been changed; the lie was part of a setup.

Paul tries to persuade Spencer and Penny that Hayden is alive, but they don't believe him because they think he is drunk. Flo takes Paul captive at gunpoint. Spencer eventually realizes that Paul was right all along.

== Cast ==
- George Nader as Paul Baxter
- Joanna Moore as Penny Spencer
- Brian Keith as Lt. Spencer
- Virginia Field as Florence Knapp
- Frank de Kova as Dutch Hayden
- Stephen Chase as Sam Crews

== Production ==
The film was originally entitled If I Should Die and was based on a magazine story by Hugh Pentecost. The story was originally adapted by Herbert Dalmas and was bought by Paramount in 1950.

Film rights eventually went to Universal. In 1956, head of production Don Hartman named his former assistant Howie Horwitz as producer. In 1956, Van Heflin signed to star and the film was scheduled to become one of the studio's largest productions of the year. However, filming was delayed. In August 1957, it was announced that Jeffrey Hunter, under contract to Twentieth Century-Fox but permitted to make one outside film per year, would take the lead role. The studio assigned Richard Carlson, known mostly as an actor, to direct. He had recently directed The Saga of Hemp Brown for Universal.

Filming began on October 23, 1957. Six days into filming, Hunter fell ill with hepatitis and withdrew after just one day of work. Filming recommenced on November 27, 1957, with Universal contract player George Nader in Hunter's role.

== Release ==
The 1957 Tony Curtis film The Midnight Story was released in the United Kingdom as Appointment with a Shadow, but the two films are unrelated.

== Reception ==
In a contemporary review for The New York Times, critic Richard W. Nason wrote that the film "has as much novelty and enchantment as the popcorn machine in the lobby."

== See also ==
- List of American films of 1957
