= Man in the Shadow (1957 American film) =

1958 film by Jack Arnold

- Film poster by Reynold Brown
- Directed by: Jack Arnold
- Written by: Gene L. Coon
- Produced by: Albert Zugsmith
- Starring: Jeff Chandler; Orson Welles; Colleen Miller; Ben Alexander
- Cinematography: Arthur E. Arling
- Edited by: Edward Curtiss
- Color process: Black and white
- Production company: Universal Pictures
- Distributed by: Universal Pictures
- Release dates: December 12, 1957 (Houston, San Antonio); December 12, 1957 (Fort Worth Texas); January 22, 1958 (United States)
- Running time: 80 minutes
- Country: United States
- Language: English
- Budget: $600,000
- Box office: $1.53 million

Man in the Shadow is a 1957 American CinemaScope crime Western film directed by Jack Arnold and starring Jeff Chandler, Orson Welles, Colleen Miller and Ben Alexander.

== Plot ==
The cow town of Spurline is effectively ruled by Virgil Renchler, owner of the Golden Empire ranch.

One night, some of Renchler's hands beat young laborer Juan Martín to death. The newly elected sheriff of Spurline, Ben Sadler, decides to investigate the murder, but must contend with Renchler's henchmen and the fierce opposition of the townspeople, who fear that Spurline would be ruined without the Golden Empire's business.

Ranch foreman Ed Yates admits to Renchler that he killed Martin, but employee Chet Huneker is persuaded to tell the law that he had hit Martin accidentally with a car. Renchler's daughter Skippy tells the sheriff what she remembers from the night of Martin's death.

Sadler is beaten by Yates and Huneker, then dragged through town, tied to the back of a truck. Sadler retrieves a shotgun, tosses aside his badge and, with help from cropper Aiken Clay, pursues Renchler and his men, defeating them with the help of the townspeople, who then return Sadler's badge to him.

== Cast ==
- Jeff Chandler as Ben Sadler
- Orson Welles as Virgil Renchler
- Colleen Miller as Skippy Renchler
- Ben Alexander as Ab Begley
- Barbara Lawrence as Helen Sadler
- John Larch as Ed Yates
- James Gleason as Hank James
- Royal Dano as Aiken Clay
- Paul Fix as Herb Parker
- Leo Gordon as Chet Huneker
- Martin Garralaga as Jesus Cisneros
- Mario Siletti as Tony Santoro, the barber
- Charles Horvath as Len Bookman
- William Schallert as Jim Shaney
- Joseph J. Greene as Harry Youngquist
- Forrest Lewis as Jake Kelley, the Coroner
- Harry Harvey Sr. as Dr. Creighton
- Joe Schneider as Juan Martin
- Mort Mills as Empire Ranch Gateman Bill Edmunds

== Production ==
The film was originally titled Pay the Devil. It was Jeff Chandler's last film under his exclusive deal with Universal.

Albert Zugsmith claimed that the film's budget was $600,000, much of which was overhead.

The part of Virgil Renchler was originally to be played by Robert Middleton, but agents from the William Morris Agency suggested Orson Welles, who badly needed the money ($60,000) to pay back taxes. It was Welles' first Western role. While making the film, Welles rewrote sections of the script. He also formed a relationship with Zugsmith, who produced Welles' next film as director, Touch of Evil (1958). Director Jack Arnold said that he experienced one incident with Welles on Welles' first day of shooting, but after that, Welles was "wonderful" to work with and offered many good ideas. Filming began in October 1956.

== See also ==
- List of American films of 1958
