= Herbert Anderson (actor) =

American actor (1917–1994)

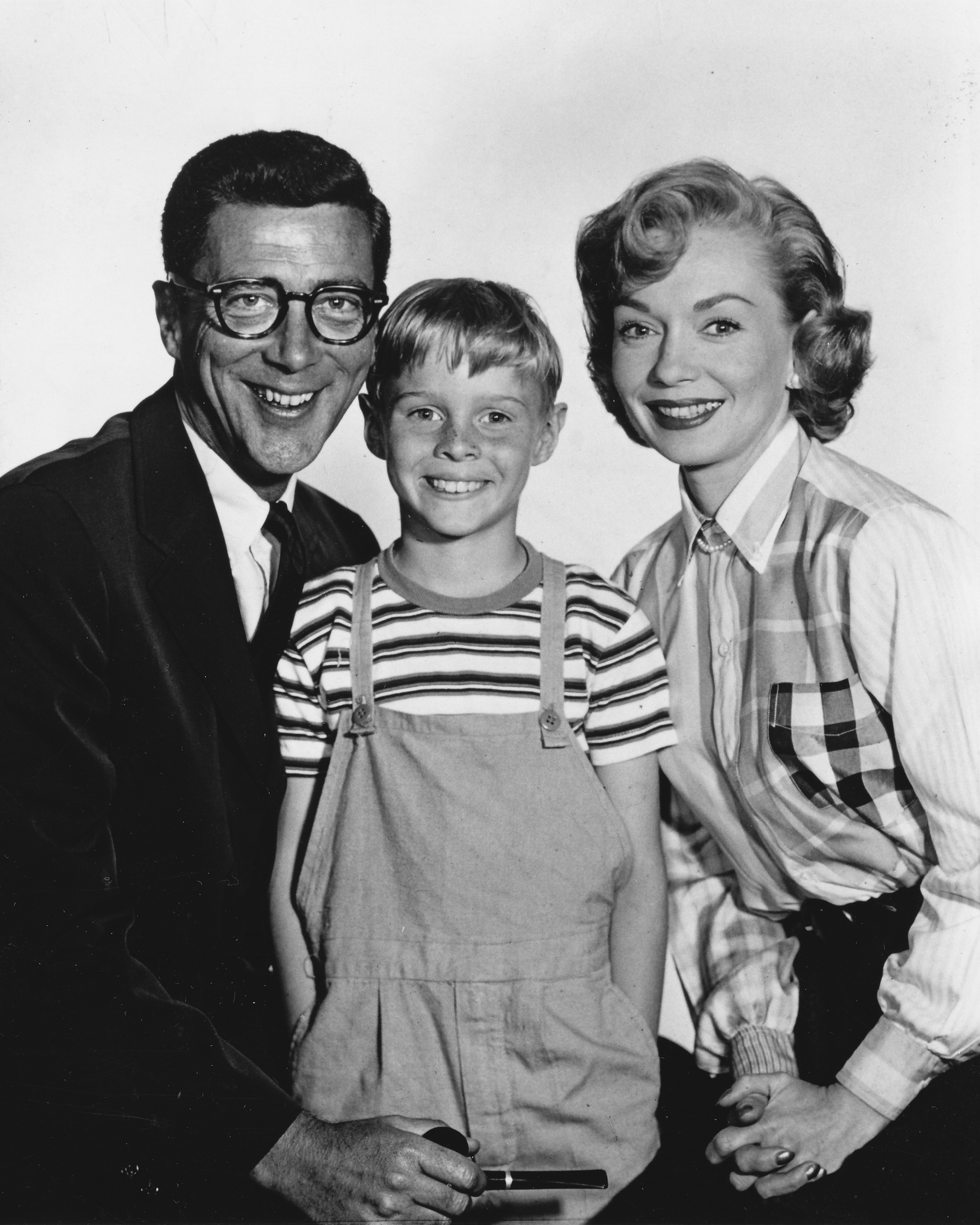
- Herbert Anderson (left) with his co-stars of Dennis the Menace, Gloria Henry and Jay North (1959)
- Born: March 30, 1917
- Died: June 11, 1994 (aged 77); Palm Springs, California, US
- Other names: Herb Anderson, Guy Anderson
- Occupation: Actor
- Years active: 1940–1975
- Spouse: Mary Virginia Palmer
- Children: 2

Herbert Anderson (March 30, 1917 – June 11, 1994) was an American character actor from Oakland, California, probably best remembered for his role as Henry Mitchell, the father, on the CBS television sitcom Dennis the Menace.

== Career ==
After a few minor roles in films for Warner Bros., Anderson got his big break in Navy Blues, starring Martha Raye and Ann Sheridan, followed by The Body Disappears and The Male Animal in which he co-starred with Henry Fonda and Olivia de Havilland. His other films include the 1949 World War II film Battleground, Give My Regards to Broadway, Excuse My Dust, Island in the Sky, The Benny Goodman Story, Kelly and Me, Joe Butterfly, My Man Godfrey (1957), I Bury the Living, Sunrise at Campobello, Hold On! and Rascal. Anderson also acted extensively in Broadway shows, including the role of Dr. Bird in The Caine Mutiny Court-Martial. He was also in the film version of The Caine Mutiny, with Humphrey Bogart; he was the only actor to appear in both the Broadway play and film.

In addition to his role on Dennis the Menace, Anderson is also known for many lead and guest-starring roles on television, including: Crossroads, The Many Loves of Dobie Gillis, The Real McCoys, Perry Mason, The David Niven Show, Mr. Adams and Eve, Sea Hunt, Alfred Hitchcock Presents, My Three Sons, The Bing Crosby Show, I Dream of Jeannie, The Smothers Brothers Show, The Cara Williams Show, Petticoat Junction, Bewitched, Daniel Boone, Family Affair, Adam-12, Green Acres, Batman, Dragnet (Ep. "The Bank Jobs" - 1967), The Brady Bunch, The Name of the Game, The Governor and J.J., Ironside, Gunsmoke (Ep. “Trip West” - 1964), Nanny and the Professor, The Jimmy Stewart Show, The Smith Family, The Rookies, Rawhide, The Man from U.N.C.L.E. and The Waltons.

== Death ==
Anderson retired from acting in 1982 after undergoing heart surgery. He died of complications from a stroke on June 11, 1994, in Palm Springs, California.

== Partial filmography ==
- The Fighting 69th (1940) - Private Casey (uncredited)
- Calling Philo Vance (1940) - First Reporter (uncredited)
- Dr. Ehrlich's Magic Bullet (1940) - Medical Assistant (uncredited)
- 'Til We Meet Again (1940) - (uncredited)
- Tear Gas Squad (1940) - Pliny Jones
- The Man Who Talked Too Much (1940) - Hotel Clerk #2 (uncredited)
- The Sea Hawk (1940) - Eph Winters (uncredited)
- Service with the Colors (1940, Short) - Hiram Briggs
- No Time for Comedy (1940) - Actor in Show (uncredited)
- Four Mothers (1941) - Reporter (uncredited)
- Honeymoon for Three (1941) - Floyd T. Ingram (Credits) / Floyd Y. Ingram
- The Strawberry Blonde (1941) - Girl-Chaser in Park (uncredited)
- Knockout (1941) - Reporter (uncredited)
- The Bride Came C.O.D. (1941) - 3rd Reporter
- Three Sons o' Guns (1941) - Michael (scenes deleted)
- Highway West (1941) - Worker (uncredited)
- Dive Bomber (1941) - Chubby
- Navy Blues (1941) - Homer Matthews
- The Body Disappears (1941) - George Appleby
- The Male Animal (1942) - Michael Barnes
- This Is the Army (1943) - Danny Davidson
- That Way with Women (1947) - Melvyn Pfeiffer
- Love and Learn (1947) - Pete
- My Wild Irish Rose (1947) - Reporter (uncredited)
- You Were Meant for Me (1948) - Eddie
- Give My Regards to Broadway (1948) - Frank Doty
- The Set-Up (1949) - Husband (uncredited)
- Battleground (1949) - Hansan
- The Yellow Cab Man (1950) - Willis Tomlin
- The Lawless (1950) - Jonas Creel
- The Skipper Surprised His Wife (1950) - Lieutenant Commander Kingslee (uncredited)
- The Magnificent Yankee (1950) - Baxter, Secretary
- The Prowler (1951) - Reporter (uncredited)
- Excuse My Dust (1951) - Ben Parrott
- Finders Keepers (1952) - Hotel Clerk
- The Girl in White (1952) - Dr. Barclay
- Island in the Sky (1953) - Breezy
- The Caine Mutiny (1954) - Ensign Rabbit (uncredited)
- The Benny Goodman Story (1956) - John Hammond Jr.
- Four Girls in Town (1957) - Ted Larabee
- Spring Reunion (1957) - Edward
- Kelly and Me (1957) - Ben Collins
- Joe Butterfly (1957) - Major Ferguson
- Night Passage (1957) - Will Renner
- My Man Godfrey (1957) - Hubert
- Alfred Hitchcock Presents (1958) (Season 4 Episode 5: "The $2,000,000 Defense") - John Keller
- Alfred Hitchcock Presents (1958) (Season 4 Episode 9: "Murder Me Twice") - George Thompson
- Official Detective (1958, Episode: "Muggers") - Mr. Melton
- I Bury the Living (1958) - Jess Jessup
- Perry Mason (1959) (Season 2, Episode 16: "The Case of the Fraudulent Photo") - Eugene Milton
- Sunrise at Campobello (1960) - Daly
- Gunsmoke (1964, Episode: "Trip West") - Elwood
- Hold On! (1966) - Ed Lindquist
- Batman 1967 (Season 3 Episode 5: "A Horse of Another Color") - Racing Secretary
- Dragnet (1967) (Season 1 Episode 15: "The Gun") - Robert Blake
- Dragnet (1967) (Season 2 Episode 4: "The Bank Jobs") - Dr. Philip Lang
- Dragnet (1968) (Season 2 Episode 15: "The Investigation") - Carl Shumley
- Rascal (1969) - Mr. Pringle
- The Rookies (1975) (Season 3 Episode 4: "Death at 6 am")

== Bibliography ==
- Halliwell, Leslie (1965). The Filmgoer's Companion / with a Foreword by Alfred Hitchcock. Hill and Wang.
