= Tonio Selwart =

German actor

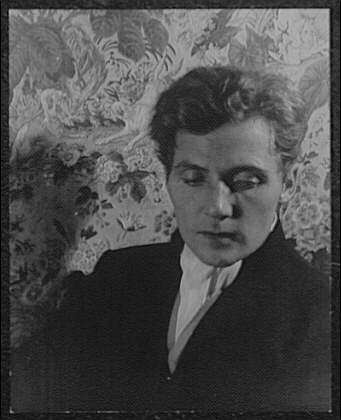
- Portrait of Selwart by Carl Van Vechten, September 20, 1933
- Born: Antonio Franz Theus Selmair-Selwart; June 9, 1896; Wartenberg, Bavaria, Germany
- Died: November 2, 2002 (aged 106); New York City, New York, U.S.
- Occupation: Actor
- Years active: 1921–1968
- Spouse(s): Claire Volkhart (m. 1918; died 1935)
- Partner: Ilse Jennings (19??–1967, died)

Antonio Franz Theus "Tonio" Selmair-Selwart (June 9, 1896 – November 2, 2002) was a German actor.

== Biography ==
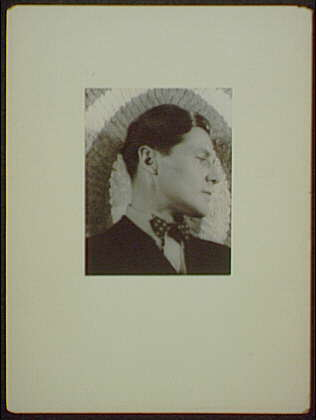
Portrait of Tonio Selwart by Carl Van Vechten, March 5, 1932

Selwart was born in Wartenberg, Bavaria, Germany, and raised in Munich. After studying medicine like his father (a well known surgeon), he decided instead to become an actor, following a lifelong interest in theater. Selwart thereafter studied acting and appeared in many plays throughout Europe. He appeared in a variety of stage productions, including classics such as Shakespeare and modern popular works like Heinrich von Kleist's romantic dream play, The Prince of Homburg, in which he played the title role.

After further honing his skills as a director, Selwart decided to try his luck in the United States of America. His luck panned out in New York City, where he landed the lead part in Lawrence Langner's and Armina Marshall's play The Pursuit of Happiness for the Theatre Guild in 1930. The comedy proved to be his first big success in America, running from 1933 to 1934, and made him, as he often put it, "a matinee idol for a whole year!" Riding high on this success, Selwart decided to emigrate permanently and became an American citizen. Selwart was himself an officer and fought in World War I on the Austro-Hungarian side, as a lieutenant in the cavalry.

He derived his nickname "Tonio" from his first name and from his family background – his parents were Austrian, and he had an Italian grandmother. He was familiar with the novella Tonio Kröger, which dealt with a half-German, half-Italian young artist in pre-World War I Germany and was written by Thomas Mann (a friend of his) and had a tape recording of the story being read by Mann himself. His wife, Claire Volkhart, a painter and sculptor, died in Germany in 1935 and his longtime companion, Ilse Jennings, a Paris-born Spanish artist, died in 1967. He died at the age of 106 in New York City on November 2, 2002.

== Acting career ==
=== Film ===
Selwart made a total of 21 film appearances. His debut was in Fritz Lang's Hangmen Also Die! (1943), as a Nazi Gestapo chief. In The Barefoot Contessa (1954), he appeared as the Pretender King, with Ava Gardner and Humphrey Bogart. His last film appearance, The Other Side of the Wind for Orson Welles, was left unreleased for decades. According to Welles in a letter to Selwart, it contains an excellent performance by this actor as the Baron. Selwart was much concerned that this "swan song" of his had never been released and even in 1992, at the age of 96, regretted that he would probably never see it. This was not only because of his age but because of his gradual loss of sight. The film was finally released in 2018, 16 years after Selwart's death.

Other titles include: Anzio (1968) by Edward Dmytryk, his last Hollywood film appearance; The North Star (1943), directed by Lewis Milestone with a script by playwright Lillian Hellman, with Erich von Stroheim; Edge of Darkness (1943), also by Milestone, his first film role, where he played his first film German soldier role, opposite Judith Anderson; Wilson (1944), where he played the German ambassador to Washington, D.C. during World War I, Count von Bernstorff; The Cross of Lorraine (1943), with Gene Kelly; The Hitler Gang (1944), playing the Nazi official Alfred Rosenberg and Romanoff and Juliet (1961), written, directed and starring Peter Ustinov, and an Italian-American adaptation of Homer's Iliad, Helen of Troy (1956), directed by Robert Wise, with Rossanna Podesta, Jacques Sernas, and in two featured roles, Selwart played opposite a then almost unknown Brigitte Bardot, in 1956.

While he played only supporting roles in English-language cinema, Selwart starred in Italian and French films, including Lupo della Frontiere (Wolf of the Frontier, 1951), during the 1950s; he never appeared in a German film. He also made a brief speaking part appearance in Luchino Visconti's Italian film Senso (1954), at the beginning opera house scene, as an Austrian officer. He spoke fluent Italian, English and French, which helped him with roles in several countries. Starting from the late 1940s until the 1950s and 1960s, he also appeared on American television, making guest appearances in drama programs, including The Fifth Column for Buick-Electra Playhouse on CBS in 1960, playing an almost-deaf Nazi officer in a group of fifth columnists operating behind the lines in Madrid during the Spanish Civil War in the 1930s (the program was adapted from a story by Ernest Hemingway and directed by John Frankenheimer).

=== Stage ===
Selwart appeared on stage around the United States (including Broadway) and in Canada. His performances included: The Pursuit of Happiness (touring with it across the U.S. and England), Candle in the Wind by Maxwell Anderson with Helen Hayes (where he played his first German Nazi officer role, a type of character he came to specialize in), The Laughing Woman with Helen Menken, Autumn Crocus, Seeds in the Wind, Liliom by Ferenc Molnár (in which Selwart played the title role), and The Hidden River in 1957, among many others.

Selwart's last American stage appearances were with Lotte Lenya in the 1964 tour of Brecht on Brecht and in the 1965 Carnegie Hall performance of Die Dreigroschenoper (The Threepenny Opera). He studied at the Actors Studio in New York and with Michael Chekhov in California. Selwart had referred to Chekov as "My best teacher in America." As a member of Eva Le Gallienne's Civic Repertory he appeared in Peter Pan, Alice in Wonderland, and Frank Wedekind's Spring's Awakening—a tragedy about adolescence which he also directed. Writer and poet May Sarton appeared in this production—one of her earliest stage roles.

In 1995, now legally blind, Selwart was interviewed by William F. Powers for his book, Alive and Well: The Emergence of the Active Nonagenarian (Rutledge Books, 1996). In the interview, Selwart reflected: "If I died today, I could say only that I had lived a very beautiful and charmed life. Even when it looked at times like something bad had happened, it soon turned back again to something positive. The loss of my eyesight, although difficult, did not make me bitter. I figured that at my age I have to expect something and remembered all those poor people who suffer from cancer and are in terrible pain. I say to myself that I may have trouble seeing, but I don't suffer any physical, mental, or emotional pain."

== Filmography ==
Year	Title	Role	Notes
1943	Hangmen Also Die!	Chief of Gestapo Kurt Haas	
1943	Edge of Darkness	Paul	Uncredited
1943	The North Star	German Captain	
1943	The Cross of Lorraine	Major Bruhl	
1944	Tampico	Kruger	
1944	The Hitler Gang	Alfred Rosenberg	
1944	Wilson	Count Von Bernstorff	
1944	Strange Affair	Leslie Carlson	
1947	Unconquered	Slave Buyer at Fair	Uncredited
1951	My Favorite Spy	Harry Crock	
1952	Frontier Wolf	Peter	
1954	Senso	Il colonello Kleist	
1954	Concert of Intrigue	General Renner	
1954	The Barefoot Contessa	The Pretender	
1956	Helen of Troy	Alpheus	
1956	Congo Crossing	Carl Rittner	
1958	Tempest		
1958	The Naked Maja	Aranda	
1960	Five Branded Women		
1961	Romanoff and Juliet	U.N. President	
1962	The Reluctant Saint	Examining Prelate	
1963	Duel at the Rio Grande		
1968	Anzio	Gen. Van MacKensen	
2018	The Other Side of the Wind	The Baron	(final film role)
