= Joe Butterfly =

1957 film by Jesse Hibbs

- Directed by: Jesse Hibbs
- Written by: Sy Gomberg; Jack Sher; Marion Hargrove
- Based on: play by Evan Wylie and Jack Ruge
- Produced by: Aaron Rosenberg
- Starring: Audie Murphy; Burgess Meredith; George Nader
- Cinematography: Irving Glassberg
- Edited by: Milton Carruth
- Production company: Universal Pictures
- Distributed by: Universal Pictures
- Release dates: May 29, 1957 (New York City); June 12, 1957 (Los Angeles)
- Running time: 90 minutes
- Country: United States
- Language: English
- Box office: $1.3 million (US rentals)

Joe Butterfly is a 1957 American comedy film directed by Jesse Hibbs starring Audie Murphy, George Nader and Keenan Wynn, with Burgess Meredith in the title role as a Japanese man. The movie was action star Murphy's only outright comedy, and it suffered by comparison to the similar Teahouse of the August Moon, released seven months earlier. The film was based on an unproduced play.

== Plot ==
The film follows the staff of the Army weekly magazine Yank, who are among the first American troops in Tokyo after Japan's surrender. They are given the difficult task of producing an issue of the magazine in three days. Short on ideas and having to meet the deadline, they enter Japan's black market and come across con artist Joe Butterfly. Butterfly shows them the high life, letting them live in a mansion complete with beautiful girls.

== Cast ==
- Audie Murphy as Private John Woodley
- George Nader as Sergeant Ed Kennedy
- Keenan Wynn as Henry Hathaway
- Keiko Shima as Chieko
- Fred Clark as Colonel E. E. Fuller
- John Agar as Sergeant Dick Mason
- Charles McGraw as Sergeant Jim McNulty
- Shinpei Shimazaki as a little boy
- Reiko Higa as False Tokyo Rose
- Tatsuo Saitō as father
- Chizu Shimazaki as mother
- Herbert Anderson as Major Ferguson
- Eddie Firestone as Sergeant Oscar Hulick
- Frank Chase as Chief Yeoman Saul Bernheim
- Harold Goodwin as Colonel Hopper
- Willard Willingham as a soldier
- Burgess Meredith as Joe Butterfly

== Production ==
Filming started July 1956. The movie was shot partly in Hong Kong and Japan as well as aboard the USS Los Angeles.

At one stage the film was not going to be shown in Japan.

According to co-writer Sy Gomberg, Audie Murphy was extremely uncomfortable playing comedy. However, the movie was an enormous hit in Japan, in part because of the Japanese people's admiration for Murphy, and partly because of its sympathetic depiction of the Japanese. Following the film, Murphy brought home a 14-year-old Japanese girl who stayed with the Murphys and helped raise their children while she attended school in America.

The original choice for the title character was meant to be David Wayne who had appeared as Sakini in the stage production of Teahouse of the August Moon. When he was unavailable the role was taken by Burgess Meredith who also played Sakini on stage.

== See also ==
- List of American films of 1957
