= Colleen Miller =

American actress (born 1932)

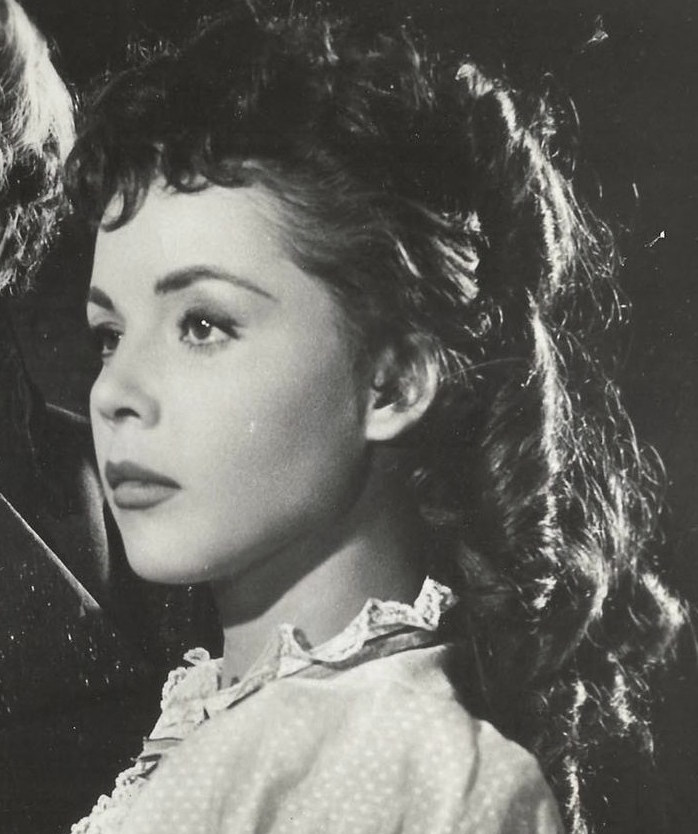
- Miller in The Purple Mask (1955)
- Born: Colleen Joy Miller; November 10, 1932 (age 93); Yakima, Washington, U.S.
- Occupation: Actress
- Years active: 1952–1972
- Spouses: Ted Briskin (m. 1955–1975) Walter Ralphs (m. 1976; died 2010)
- Children: 2

Colleen Joy Miller (born November 10, 1932) is an American former actress. She starred in several films, such as the Westerns Gunfight at Comanche Creek (1963) and Four Guns to the Border (1954).

== Early life ==
The daughter of Elias and Lillian Miller, she was born in Yakima, Washington, and raised in Portland, Oregon. Miller attended Lincoln High School in Portland and graduated at age fifteen. In 1949, she was chosen "Miss Portland". Her mother named her after actress Colleen Moore.

As a child, Miller studied ballet, but when she was older she changed to popular dancing. After graduating, she worked as a professional dancer in a San Francisco ballet company, and relocated to Las Vegas after three seasons to work at the Flamingo.

== Career ==
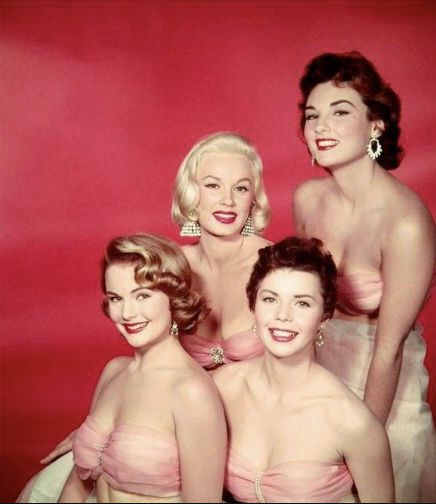
Photo of "Universal starlets" in 1954 (from left: Myrna Hansen, Mamie Van Doren, Allison Hayes, Colleen Miller)

While dancing in Las Vegas, Miller was spotted by a talent agent who signed her to a contract with Howard Hughes for his RKO Pictures company. She was 19 when she made her first film appearance in The Las Vegas Story, starring Jane Russell. She shared top billing with Rory Calhoun in her next film, a western titled Four Guns to the Border, which co-starred Nina Foch. She then had a leading role in Playgirl as a young Midwestern girl who comes to New York City to be a model and ends up involved in a shooting and a scandal. She then was signed by Universal Pictures, where she co-starred with Tony Curtis in two films, The Purple Mask and The Rawhide Years.

Miller made one more film after 1958, a western titled Gunfight at Comanche Creek opposite Audie Murphy, before retiring from acting. She has an uncredited bit part in 1972's Stand Up and Be Counted.

== Personal life ==
On January 20, 1955, Miller married camera manufacturer Ted Briskin. They remained wed until 1975. She married Walter Ralphs, an heir to the Ralphs supermarket chain, in 1976, until his death in 2010. She currently resides in California.

== Filmography ==
Year	Title	Role	Notes
1952	The Las Vegas Story	Mary	Starred Jane Russell, Victor Mature
1953	Man Crazy	Judy Bassett	
1954	Four Guns to the Border	Lolly Bhumer	co-starred with Rory Calhoun, Walter Brennan
1954	Playgirl	Phyllis Matthews	co-starred with Barry Sullivan
1955	The Purple Mask	Laurette de Latour	co-starred with Tony Curtis
1956	The Rawhide Years	Zoe Fontaine	co-starred with Tony Curtis
1957	The Night Runner	Susan Mayes	co-starred with Ray Danton
1957	Man in the Shadow	Skippy Renchler	co-starred with Jeff Chandler and Orson Welles
1957	Hot Summer Night	Irene Partain	co-starred with Leslie Nielsen
1958	Step Down to Terror	Helen Walters	co-starred with Charles Drake and Rod Taylor
1963	Gunfight at Comanche Creek	Abbie Stevens	co-starred with Audie Murphy and Ben Cooper
1972	Stand Up and Be Counted	Nun	Uncredited

== Works cited ==
- Fitzgerald, Michael G.; Magers, Boyd (2006). Ladies of the Western: Interviews with Fifty-One More Actresses from the Silent Era to the Television Westerns of the 1950s and 1960s. McFarland. ISBN 978-1-476-60796-2.
