= Playgirl (1954 film) =

1954 film by Joseph Pevney

- Theatrical release poster
- Directed by: Joseph Pevney
- Screenplay by: Robert Blees
- Story by: Ray Buffum
- Produced by: Albert J. Cohen
- Starring: Shelley Winters; Barry Sullivan; Colleen Miller
- Cinematography: Carl E. Guthrie
- Edited by: Virgil W. Vogel
- Production company: Universal Pictures
- Distributed by: Universal Pictures
- Release date: April 21, 1954
- Running time: 85 minutes
- Country: United States
- Language: English

Playgirl is a 1954 American crime film directed by Joseph Pevney and starring Shelley Winters, Barry Sullivan, and Colleen Miller. It was produced and released by Universal Pictures.

== Plot ==
Innocent and attractive Phyllis Matthews leaves her Nebraska home for New York City and an ambition to become a model. Fran Davis, a nightclub singer, welcomes her to town, where she quickly meets magazine writer Tom Bradley and his editor, Mike Marsh.

Fran is having a fling with Mike, who is married, but either unable or unwilling to get a divorce. Warned about life in the big city and how different it can be, Phyllis finds out first-hand in a hurry, wealthy Ted Andrews insulting her by offering $100 to spend the night.

Phyllis's beauty gives the magazine guys an idea. They pose her for the cover of their next issue, which makes Phyllis an overnight sensation. Fran, however, becomes morose, then angry, believing Phyllis is trying to seduce both Mike and Tom, and becoming desperate about her own future. A fit of anger results in an armed Fran accidentally shooting Mike, and the scandal envelops Phyllis, ruining her reputation and new career. She leaves for home, sadder but wiser.

== Cast ==
- Shelley Winters as Fran
- Barry Sullivan as Mike Marsh
- Colleen Miller as Phyllis Matthews
- Richard Long as Barron Courtney
- Gregg Palmer as Tom Burton
- Kent Taylor as Ted Andrews
- Jacqueline deWit as Greta Marsh
- Dave Barry as Jonathan
- Philip Van Zandt as Lew Martel
- James McCallion as Paul
- Paul Richards as Wilbur
- Helen Beverly as Anne
- Myrna Hansen as Linda
- Mara Corday as Pam

== Reception ==
The New York Times gave the film a mixed review, "Playgirl, at the Mayfair, is a routine, unconvincing case history about some of New York's plushier pitfalls. Shelley Winters, Barry Sullivan and a newcomer named Colleen Miller head the cast of this Universal-International drama that for all its pretensions of sophisticated insight seems as old and familiar as the very hills ... Inspired performances could hardly be expected from such contrived material, although the Blees scenario provides a smattering of pungent dialogue and one fine, ugly encounter between a sadistic restaurateur and a society weakling."
