= Congo Crossing =

1956 film by Joseph Pevney

- Film poster by Reynold Brown
- Directed by: Joseph Pevney
- Screenplay by: Richard Alan Simmons
- Story by: Houston Branch
- Produced by: Howard Christie
- Starring: Virginia Mayo; George Nader; Peter Lorre
- Cinematography: Russell Metty
- Edited by: Sherman Todd
- Color process: Technicolor
- Production company: Universal Pictures
- Distributed by: Universal Pictures
- Release date: July 2, 1956
- Running time: 85 minutes
- Country: United States
- Language: English

Congo Crossing is a 1956 American Technicolor adventure film directed by Joseph Pevney and starring Virginia Mayo, George Nader and Peter Lorre. It was produced and distributed by Universal Pictures. Most of the exterior sequences were shot in the Los Angeles County Arboretum and Botanic Garden.

== Plot ==
Congotanga, West Africa, has no extradition laws; the government is controlled by foreign gangsters, headed by Carl Rittner (Tonio Selwart). The latest plane from Europe carries Louise Whitman (Virginia Mayo), (fleeing a French murder charge), and Mannering (Raymond Bailey), who pays resident hit man O'Connell (Michael Pate) to kill her. Through a chain of circumstances Louise, O'Connell, and heroic surveyor David Carr (George Nader) end up alone in the jungle on Carr's mission to determine the true border of Congotanga... in which Rittner is keenly interested.

== Cast ==
- Virginia Mayo as Louise Whitman
- George Nader as David Carr
- Peter Lorre as Colonel John Miguel Orlando Arragas
- Michael Pate as Bart O'Connell
- Rex Ingram as Dr. Leopold Gorman
- Tonio Selwart as Carl Rittner
- Kathryn Givney as Amelia Abbott
- Tudor Owen as Emile Zorfus
- Raymond Bailey as Peter Mannering
- George Ramsey as Miguel Diniz
- Maurice Donner as Marquette
- Bernie Hamilton as Pompala
- Harold Dyenforth as Steiner

== See also ==
- List of American films of 1956

== Bibliography ==
- Fetrow, Alan G. Feature films, 1950-1959: a United States filmography. McFarland & Company, 1999.
- Youngkin, Stephen. The Lost One: A Life of Peter Lorre. University Press of Kentucky, 2005.
