= Lady Godiva of Coventry =

1955 film by Arthur Lubin

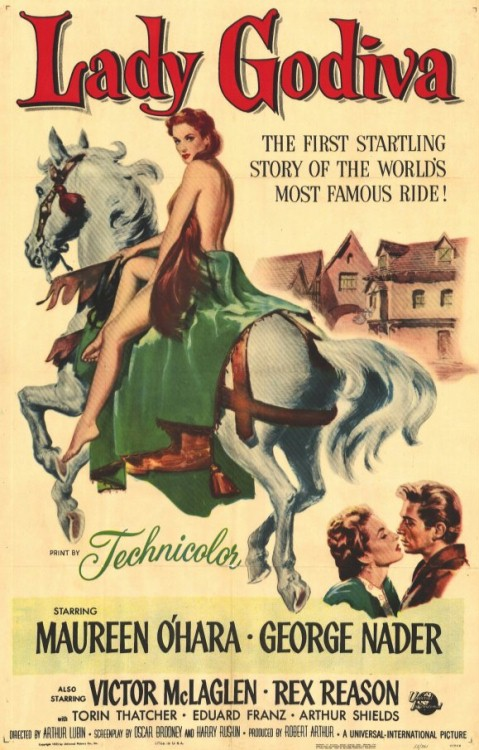
- Theatrical release poster by Reynold Brown
- Directed by: Arthur Lubin
- Written by: Harry Ruskin; Oscar Brodney
- Based on: Story by Oscar Brodney
- Produced by: Robert Arthur
- Starring: Maureen O'Hara; George Nader; Victor McLaglen; Rex Reason
- Cinematography: Carl Guthrie
- Edited by: Paul Weatherwax
- Music by: Hans J. Salter (uncredited); Frank Skinner (uncredited)
- Production company: Universal Pictures
- Distributed by: Universal Pictures
- Release date: November 2, 1955 (United States)
- Running time: 89 minutes
- Country: United States
- Language: English

Lady Godiva of Coventry is a 1955 American Technicolor historical drama film, directed by Arthur Lubin. It starred Maureen O'Hara in the title role. Alec Harford, the English actor who portrayed Tom the Tailor, died eight months before the film's release.

== Plot ==
The film is set in 11th-century England. King Edward the Confessor wants the Saxon Lord Leofric, who rules Coventry, to marry a Norman woman, Yolanda. When he refuses, he is sentenced to jail, where he meets Godiva, the sheriff's sister. The two fall in love and soon they are wedded. The times are turbulent and Godiva proves a militant bride; unhistorically, unrest between the Anglo-Saxon populace and the increasingly influential Norman French lead to her famous ride.

== Cast ==
- Maureen O'Hara as Lady Godiva
- George Nader as Lord Leofric
- Victor McLaglen as Grimald
- Rex Reason as Harold
- Torin Thatcher as Lord Godwin
- Eduard Franz as King Edward
- Leslie Bradley as Comte Eustace
- Arthur Shields as Innkeeper
- Robert Warwick as Humbert
- Arthur Gould-Porter as Thorold
- Grant Withers as Pendar
- Anthony Eustrel as Prior
- Kathryn Givney as An Abbess
- Sim Iness as Oswin
- Thayer Roberts as William, Duke of Normandy
- Alec Harford as Tom the Tailor
- Clint Eastwood as First Saxon (uncredited)
- Alma Lawton as Lady Yolanda (uncredited)

== Production ==
In early 1954, it was announced that Maureen O'Hara would star in the film based on a script by Oscar Brodney produced by Robert Arthur. It was made at Universal, where O'Hara had a one-film-a-year contract. The script was described as "semi-historical".

Lex Barker was reportedly going to play the male lead but O'Hara objected, claiming audiences would only see him as Tarzan. Jeff Chandler was signed instead. Victor McLaglen joined the cast as Chandler's helper.

Shortly before filming began, however, Chandler was replaced by a Universal contractee, George Nader. Chandler was still making Foxfire which would finish only a day before Godiva was scheduled to start and wanted a break. Nader had previously replaced Chandler on Five Rivers to Cross after the star was suspended by the studio due to a contract dispute.

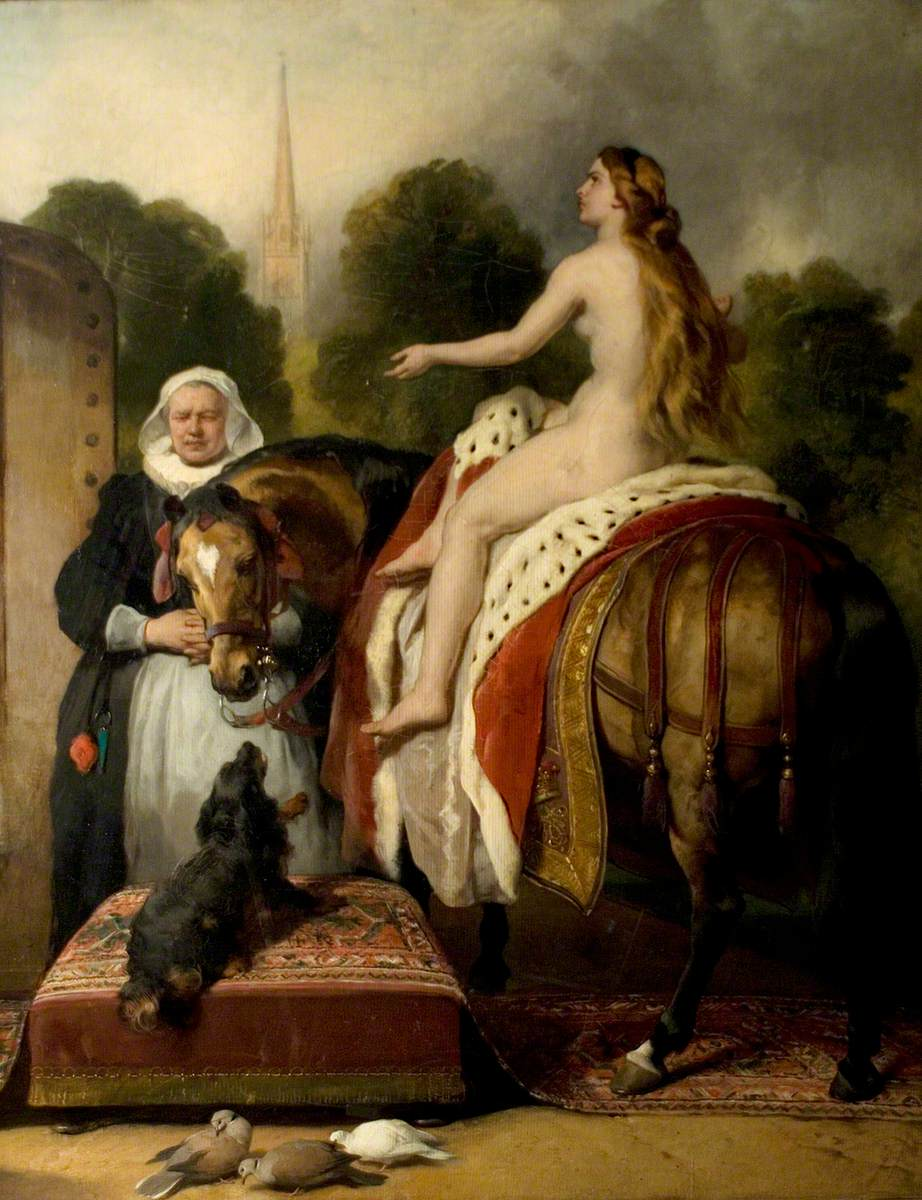
Lady Godiva's Prayer, Edwin Landseer (1865)

Arthur Lubin was assigned to direct. He said he did not want to but the studio would put him under suspension if he refused. He later called it "a bad picture".

Filming started on 30 August 1954.

Rex Reason joined the cast. He had previously been acting for Universal under the name "Bart Roberts" but for this film the studio allowed him to use his real name.

Maureen O'Hara filmed the famous ride wearing a leotard, with her long hair covering the rest of her body. Arthur Lubin said he was inspired by the painting by Edwin Landseer. The sequence was shot on a closed set.

== Reception ==
Diabolique magazine wrote in 2019, "Why this movie tanked compared to other colourful costume periods of the time is a mystery – it’s bright and cheerful and stars Maureen O’Hara in all her red haired glory (she does the final ride in a body stocking, in case you’re wondering). Maybe more screen time should have been devoted to her rather than her leading man, Universal’s back up Jeff Chandler, George Nader, but I’ve always liked this movie – like so much of Lubin’s output, it was perfect Saturday afternoon TV fodder when I was growing up."

== See also ==
- Godiva
- List of historical drama films
- List of American films of 1955
