= Flood Tide (1958 film) =

1958 film by Abner Biberman

- German release poster
- Directed by: Abner Biberman
- Written by: Dorothy Cooper
- Story by: Barry Trivers
- Produced by: Robert Arthur
- Starring: George Nader; Cornell Borchers; Michel Ray
- Cinematography: Arthur E. Arling
- Edited by: Ted J. Kent
- Music by: William Lava; Henry Mancini
- Production company: Universal Pictures
- Distributed by: Universal Pictures
- Release date: February 1958 (United States)
- Running time: 82 minutes
- Country: United States
- Language: English

Flood Tide is a 1958 American CinemaScope drama film noir romance film directed by Abner Biberman and starring George Nader, Cornell Borchers, and Michel Ray.

== Plot ==
A 10-year-old boy's testimony results in Bill Holeran being sent to prison. Steve Martin, landlord to widow Anne Gordon and her young son, suspects that something is amiss with the child's story, and resumes a romantic relationship with Anne that he had previously broken off, in order to get at the truth.

== Cast ==
- George Nader as Steve Martin
- Cornell Borchers as Anne Gordon
- Michel Ray as David Gordon
- Judson Pratt as Maj. Harvey Thornwald - Naval Doctor
- Joanna Moore as Barbara Brooks
- Charles Arnt as Mr. Appleby - Grocer (as Charles E. Arnt)
- Russ Conway as Bill Holeran
- John Morley as Detective lieutenant
- John Maxwell as John Brighton - Halleran's Attorney
- Carl Bensen as Dist. Atty. Adams
- Della Malzahn as Beverly
- Hugh Lawrence as Charlie "Barney" Barnum

== See also ==
- List of American films of 1958
