= The Las Vegas Story (film) =

1952 film by Robert Stevenson

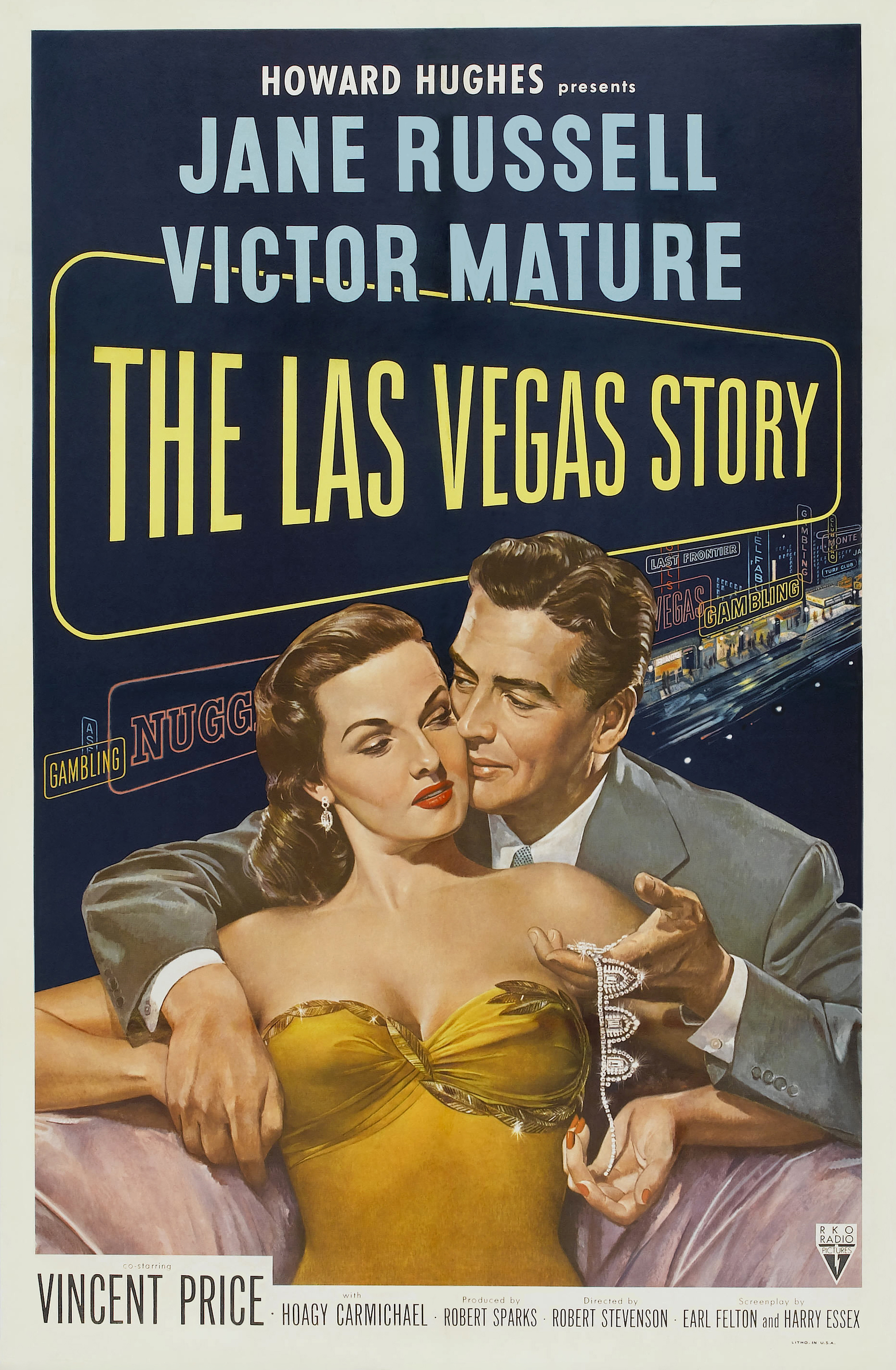
- Theatrical release poster
- Directed by: Robert Stevenson
- Screenplay by: Paul Jarrico; Earl Felton; Harry Essex
- Story by: Jay Dratler
- Produced by: Robert Sparks; Howard Hughes; Samuel Bischoff
- Starring: Jane Russell; Victor Mature; Vincent Price; Hoagy Carmichael
- Cinematography: Harry J. Wild
- Edited by: Frederic Knudtson; George C. Shrader
- Music by: Leigh Harline (score); Hoagy Carmichael (music, lyrics); Harold Adamson (lyrics)
- Production company: RKO Radio Pictures
- Release dates: January 30, 1952 (New York); February 16, 1952 (Los Angeles)
- Running time: 88 minutes
- Country: United States
- Language: English
- Box office: $1.2 million (U.S. rentals)

The Las Vegas Story is a 1952 American suspense film noir directed by Robert Stevenson and starring Jane Russell and Victor Mature. The film was produced by Samuel Bischoff, Robert Sparks and RKO Radio Pictures head Howard Hughes. The story linking the scenes is narrated by Hoagy Carmichael.

== Plot ==
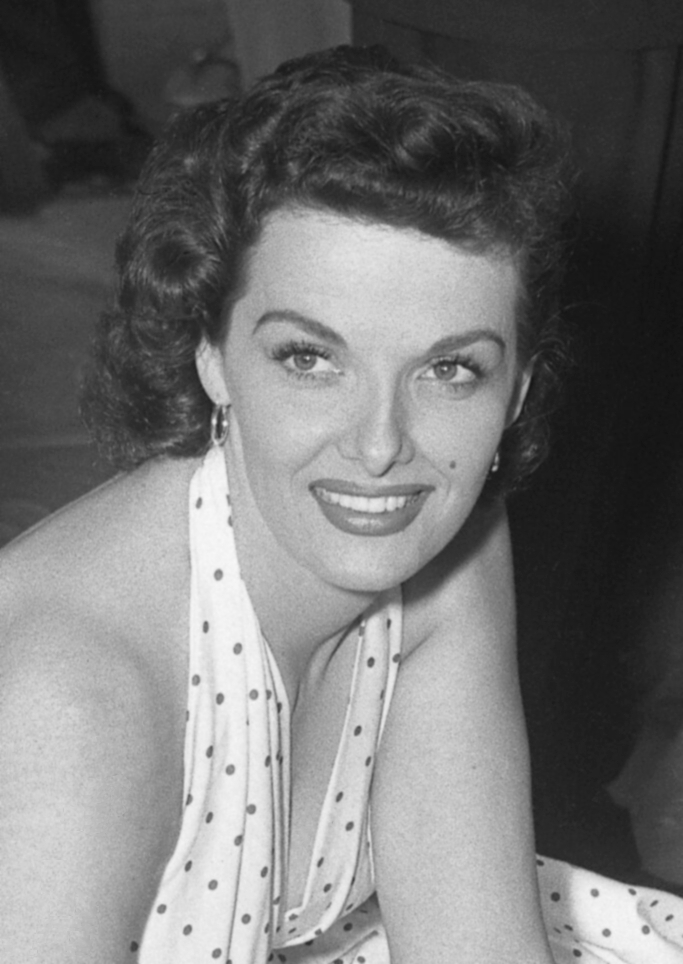
Jane Russell as Linda Rollins

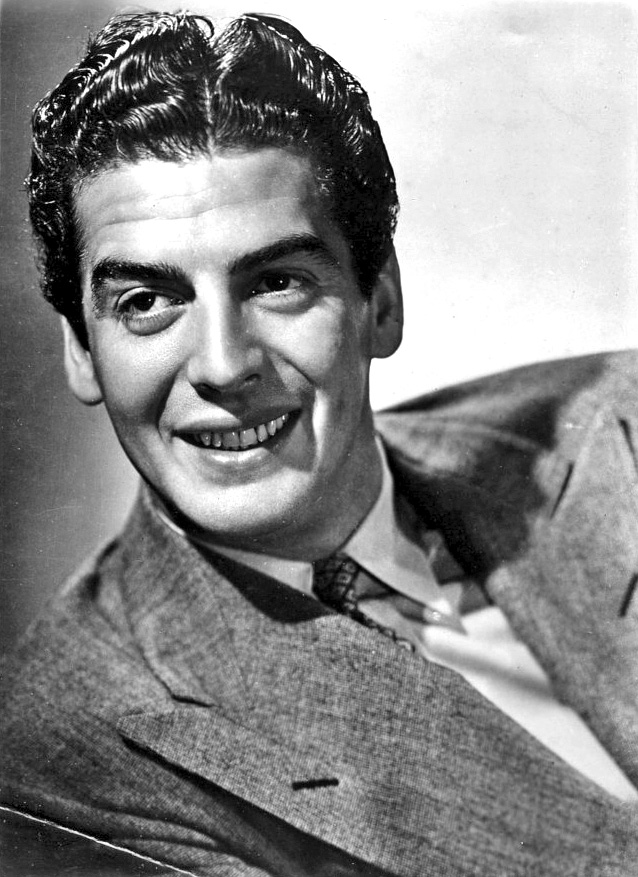
Victor Mature as Dave Andrews

Linda and Lloyd Rollins are traveling by train from Boston, Massachusetts, to Las Vegas, Nevada, on vacation. He has a gambling addiction and has taken money from his firm to cover gambling debts. She previously working in Las Vegas as a singer at the Last Chance Casino when she was single. At that time, Linda was in a relationship with Dave Anderson, a deputy with the Clark County Sheriff's Department. Also traveling on the train was Tom Hubler, another passenger.

Linda and Lloyd check in at the Fabulous Hotel, where Lloyd requests a $100,000 line of credit for the hotel casino. He immediately starts gambling. Linda sonn discovers that Lloyd wanted to visit Las Vegas to gamble, hoping to win enough money to settle his financial problems. She worries that he may be in legal trouble also. Lloyd insisted that Linda bring her necklace, worth $150,000, on this trip

When Linda returns to the Last Chance, she encounters Dave, now a detective with the sheriff's department. He had broken up with her when he shipped out with his military unit during the war and she did not say goodbye to him. The next day, Tom tries to talk to Linda about the necklace at the hotel pool, but she rebuffs him. Mr. Drucker, the hotel's managing director, discovers that Rollins is a fraud and expels him from the hotel.

Desperate for cash, Lloyd obtains $10,000 in credit from Clayton, owner of the Last Chance, with Linda's necklace as collateral. Outside the bar, Tom reveals to Lloyd that he is employed by the insurance company that wrote a policy on Linda's necklace. Tom demands to know who has the necklace. Lloyd says it is in the safe at the Fabulous Hotel, a lie.

Lloyd then loses all the $10,000 gambling. He returns to Clayton, asking for more credit. Clayton refuses, telling Lloyd that he will sell back the necklace to him for $10,000. Lloyd leaves the Last Chance empty handed.

The next morning, Clayton is found stabbed to death at the Last Chance, with the necklace missing. Dave assumes that Clayton's murderer took it. Dave arrests Rollins, who tries to persuade his wife to claim that they were together at the time of the murder. However, since she was at Dave's house at that time, it is impossible.

Tom returns to the crime scene with Linda. He asks her to reenact her steps from the previous night. In the process, Huber implicates himself to Linda as Clayton's murderer. Dave learns the truth when Happy the hotel entertainer tells him about Tom's interactions with Linda.

Dave phones Linda to warn her about Tom, but he kidnaps Linda in his search for the necklace. The Sheriff's Department places roadblocks on all major highways outside of Las Vegas and broadcast a description of Tom and his vehicle. He then hijacks another car at Lake Mead, killing the driver. Flying by helicopter, Dave spots the stolen vehicle. The helicopter forces the vehicle to stop at an abandoned airport in the desert. Tom drags Linda out of the car and wounds the pilot . He forces Dave to discard his gun by threatening to kill Linda. However, Dave chases down Tom and shoots him dead. Dave recovers the necklace.

Back in Las Vegas, Linda tells Lloyd that she is filing for a divorce He is arrested on charges including embezzlement and is extradited back to Massachusetts. Linda decides to stay in Las Vegas with Dave.

== Cast ==
- Jane Russell as Linda Rollins
- Victor Mature as Dave Andrews
- Vincent Price as Lloyd Rollins
- Hoagy Carmichael as Happy
- Brad Dexter as Tom Hubler
- Gordon Oliver as Mr. Drucker
- Jay C. Flippen as Captain H. A. Harris
- Will Wright as Mike Fogarty
- Bill Welsh as Mr. Martin
- Ray Montgomery as Desk Clerk
- Colleen Miller as Mary
- Robert J. Wilke as Clayton
- Paul Frees as District Attorney (uncredited)

== Production ==
The film, originally called The Miami Story, is based on a story by Jay Dratner. It was initially conceived as a vehicle for Robert Ryan.The original plan was to film the movie in Florida, but it was later changed to Nevada.

Filming of The Las Vegas Story was scheduled to begin in December 1950, but was delayed to March 1951. The title was changed to The Las Vegas Story. Production was scheduled to begin on March 19th, but was again delayed until April 9th and then to April 19th. Production wrapped by the second half of June.

RKO studio head Howard Hughes ordered the removal of screen credit for communist writer Paul Jarrico. In response, Jarrico sued RKO but lost the case because the court decided that he had voided the contract's morals clause. The Las Vegas Story was filmed in Las Vegas, at Naval Air Weapons Station China Lake and at locations in the Mojave Desert.

== Reception ==
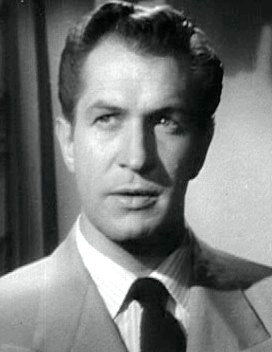
Vincent Price as Lloyd Rollins

In a contemporary review for The New York Times, critic Bosley Crowther called The Las Vegas Story "one of those jukebox gambling films that gives the impression of being made up as it goes along". He also wrote,

"Miss Russell is slightly grotesque to look upon in the tacky costumes and pinched-in get-ups with which she is cheaply adorned, and for the rest she contributes to the drama nothing more than a petulant pout and a twangy whine. But, then, the scriptwriters, Earl Felton and Harry Essex, have not made demands in their loose-jointed, tabloid-tinted fiction for more than the lady gives. And the rest of the cast does not embarrass her by playing above her head. The best to be said on behalf of this hit-or-miss R. K. O. film is that, in throwing side glances at the sap-traps of Las Vegas, it points its own indeterminate moral: patrons proceed at their own risk; the odds are in favor of the house."

Critic Edwin Schallert of the Los Angeles Times wrote:

"Colorful Nevada background of 'The Las Vegas Story' unquestionably will add to its special appeal to audiences here. A swank impression of the resorts in Las Vegas is a highlight, and the gambling issue is effectively woven into the plot, with possession of a diamond necklace as the special gimmick to keep the story going. ... [I]t is entertainment of varied character that is supplied by the picture, with performances that genuinely carry it along."

The Las Vegas Story lost an estimated $600,000 at the box office.

== See also ==
- List of films set in Las Vegas
