= The Night Runner =

1957 film directed by Abner Biberman

- Theatrical release poster
- Directed by: Abner Biberman
- Screenplay by: Gene Levitt
- Based on: Owen Cameron (Based on a adapted story by)
- Produced by: Albert J. Cohen
- Starring: Ray Danton; Colleen Miller
- Cinematography: George Robinson
- Edited by: Al Joseph
- Color process: Black and white
- Production company: Universal International
- Distributed by: Universal Pictures
- Release date: April 2, 1957
- Running time: 79 minutes
- Country: United States
- Language: English

The Night Runner is a 1957 American film noir drama film directed by Abner Biberman, produced by Albert J.Cohen, and starring Ray Danton and Colleen Miller. Its screenplay was written by Gene Levitt. The story focuses on a released mental patient who falls in love but cannot control his violent urges.

== Plot ==
Roy Turner, a mental patient with a violent past, is prematurely released from a state mental hospital because of overcrowding. His psychiatrist advises him to avoid stressful situations. Realizing that he cannot handle the pressures of big-city life, he moves into a beach-side motel in a small coastal town in Southern California and falls in love with Susan Mayes, the daughter of the motel's owner, Loren. Things go well until Loren discovers the truth about Roy's hospitalization. While Susan is out one evening, Loren commands Roy to leave, calling him a "lunatic". Roy snaps, killing the man. At first, no evidence ties Roy to the crime and, for a time, things again look bright for him and his relationship with Susan. They plan to sell the motel and move away together. However, while packing, Susan comes across a hotel registration card that might implicate Roy, although she does not realize this; she is merely excited that there may finally be a clue to finding her father's killer. Cornered, Roy suggests a moonlight walk on the beach. There, he confesses to killing her father and says he must now kill her. She falls from the rocks into the raging tide as he advances toward her. Roy comes to his senses and rescues her, taking her back to the motel, where he phones the police turning himself in.

== Cast ==
- Ray Danton as Roy Turner
- Colleen Miller as Susan Mayes
- Merry Anders as Amy Hansen
- Willis Bouchey as Loren Mayes
- Harry Jackson as Hank Hanson
- Robert Anderson as Ed Wallace
- Jess Inness as Miss Dodd
- Eddy Waller as Vernon
- John Stephenson as Dr. Crawford
- Alexander Campbell as Dr. Royce
- Natalie Masters as Miss Lowell
- Richard H. Cutting as Male Interviewer (as Richard Cutting)
- Steve Pendleton as Captain Reynolds
- Jack Lomas as Real Estate Man
- Bill Erwin as McDermott
- Alex Sharp as Deputy

== See also ==
- List of American films of 1957
