= Kathryn Givney =

American actress (1896–1978)

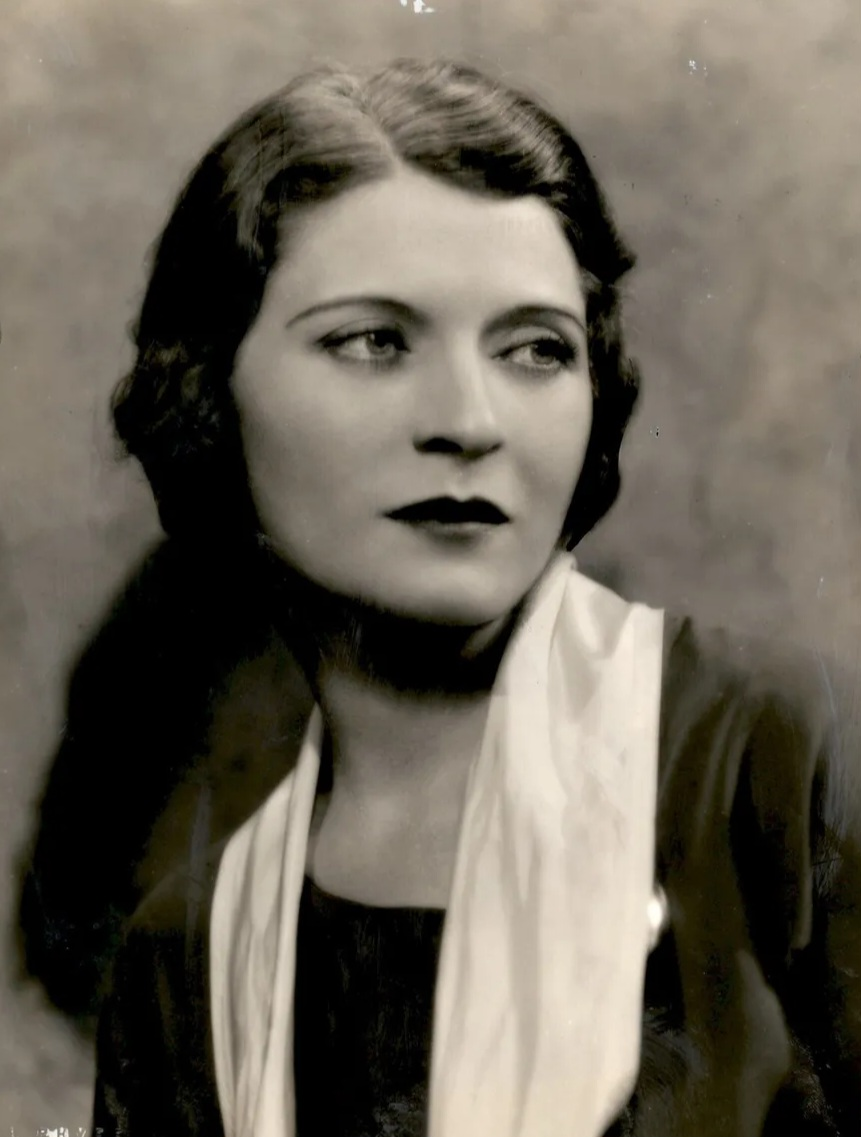
- Givney in 1937
- Born: Catharine Givney; October 27, 1896; Rhinelander, Wisconsin, U.S.
- Died: March 16, 1978 (aged 81); Hollywood, California, U.S.
- Resting place: Forest Lawn Memorial Park
- Occupation: Actress
- Years active: 1930–1972
- Spouse(s): J. George Stutzman (m. 1919, divorced) Francis Connolly (died 1960)

Kathryn Givney (October 27, 1896 – March 16, 1978) was an American actress in theater and in films.

== Biography ==
Givney was born Catharine Givney in Rhinelander, Wisconsin in 1896.

In 1928, Givney was a member of the S. E. Cochran Repertory Company. In 1930, she appeared in Stepping Sisters at the Hollywood Playhouse.

She appeared in the films Follow Thru, Isn't It Romantic?, My Friend Irma, Side Street, Ma and Pa Kettle Go to Town, Operation Pacific, Valentino, A Place in the Sun, Lightning Strikes Twice, Double Crossbones, Little Egypt, Too Young to Kiss, The Kid from Left Field, Let's Do It Again, Three Coins in the Fountain, Daddy Long Legs, Count Three and Pray, Lady Godiva of Coventry, Guys and Dolls, Congo Crossing, The Wayward Bus, A Certain Smile, The Man in the Net, From the Terrace, That Touch of Mink, Four Horsemen of the Apocalypse, and Once You Kiss a Stranger.

On Broadway, Givney appeared in This, Too, Shall Pass (1946), Good Night, Ladies (1945), Wallflower (1944), Tomorrow the World (1943), The Flowers of Virtue (1942), Little Dark Horse (1941), The Happiest Days (1939), One Thing After Another (1937), Fulton of Oak Falls (1937), If This Be Treason (1935), Lost Horizons (1934), Absent Father (1932), Peter Flies High (1931), The Behavior of Mrs. Crane (1928), Nightstick (1927), We All Do (1927), and Ballyhoo (1927). On television, Givney appeared on Season 1 Episode 18 of Hazel "Hazel's Secret Wish" which aired February 1, 1962. She also appeared in three Perry Mason episodes 1957–1966 as Amelia Haskins, Matilda Bendon, and Wilma Gregson. She guest starred in episode 24 from Season 5 of The Donna Reed Show, House on the Hill.

=== Marriage ===
Givney was married twice. Her first husband was J. George Stutzman, whom she married in 1919. The marriage ended in divorce. Givney was later married to Francis Connolly until his death in 1960.

=== Death ===
On March 16, 1978, Givney died at her home in Hollywood at age 81, and was buried at Forest Lawn Memorial Park in Hollywood Hills.

== Filmography ==
Year	Title	Role	Notes
1930	Follow Thru	Mrs. Bascomb	
1931	Lover Come Back	Mrs. March	
1948	Isn't It Romantic?	Clarisse Thayer	
1949	My Friend Irma	Mrs. Rhinelander	
1950	Side Street	Nurse Carter	Uncredited
1950	Ma and Pa Kettle Go to Town	Mrs. Victoria Masterson	
1951	Operation Pacific	Commander Steele	
1951	Valentino	Mrs. Williams	Uncredited
1951	A Place in the Sun	Louise Eastman	
1951	Lightning Strikes Twice	Myra Nolan	
1951	Double Crossbones	Lady Montrose	
1951	Little Egypt	Cynthia Graydon	
1951	Too Young to Kiss	Miss Benson	
1953	The Kid from Left Field	Judge Slavin	Uncredited
1953	Let's Do It Again	Mrs. Randolph	
1954	Three Coins in the Fountain	Mrs. Burgoyne	
1955	Daddy Long Legs	Gertrude Pendleton	
1955	Count Three and Pray	Mrs. Decrais	
1955	Lady Godiva of Coventry	Abbess	
1955	Guys and Dolls	General Matilda Cartwright	
1956	Alfred Hitchcock Presents	Mrs. Princey	Season 2 Episode 1: "Wet Saturday"
1956	Congo Crossing	Amelia Abbott	
1957	The Wayward Bus	Mrs. Elliott (Bernice) Pritchard	
1958	A Certain Smile	Madame Griot	
1959	The Man in the Net	Mrs. Carey	
1960	From the Terrace	Mrs. St. John	
1961	Alfred Hitchcock Presents	Mrs. Colton	Season 6 Episode 34: "Servant Problem"
1962	Four Horsemen of the Apocalypse	Elena von Hartrott	
1962	That Touch of Mink	Mrs. Evelyn Haskell	Uncredited
1962	Hazel	Mrs. Forbes-Craigie	Season 1 Episode 18: "Hazel's Secret Wish"
1969	Once You Kiss a Stranger	Aunt Margaret	
