= Hot Summer Night (film) =

1957 film

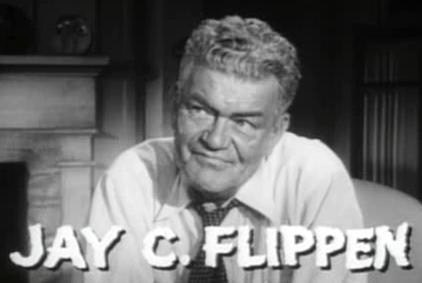
- Jay C. Flippen in film trailer
- Directed by: David Friedkin
- Written by: Morton Fine; David Friedkin; Edwin P. Hicks
- Produced by: Morton Fine
- Starring: Leslie Nielsen; Colleen Miller; Edward Andrews
- Cinematography: Harold J. Marzorati
- Edited by: Ben Lewis
- Music by: André Previn
- Distributed by: Metro-Goldwyn-Mayer
- Release date: February 15, 1957
- Running time: 86 minutes
- Country: United States
- Language: English
- Budget: $355,000
- Box office: $500,000

Hot Summer Night is a 1957 crime film directed by David Friedkin and starring Leslie Nielsen, Colleen Miller, and Edward Andrews.

== Plot ==
Out of work newspaper reporter Bill Partain is on his honeymoon when he reads about a bank robbery in Sedalia, Missouri, pulled off by notorious criminal Tom Ellis and his gang. Having once interviewed Ellis's girlfriend Ruth Childers for a Kansas City, Missouri, paper, Partain convinces himself an exclusive interview with Ellis will help him land a new job.

Lying to his new wife Irene about where they are going, Bill drives them to a small Ozarks town where he believes Ruth is living. Townspeople are reluctant to help Bill locate her, and deputy Lou Follett warns him that almost everyone in the community considers him one of them and will protect him - even to very extreme lengths.

Bill finally finds Ruth, who remembers him favorably. She manages to arrange his being taken to Ellis by a young man named Kermit, who is close to the gang, and sometimes works for Ellis.

Ellis grants Bill an interview, boasting of his crimes, to the consternation of off-balance gunman Elly Horn, who suddenly shoots both Ellis and Kermit. He also shoots his own gang member, Oren, by accidentally trying to kill Bill.

Irene, left behind, is desperate to find her husband, who is now being held by Oren and Elly for a ransom of $50,000. She gets the address from Ruth, hitchhikes to Ellis's hideout, and notifies the police, who arrive just in time to rescue Bill.

== Cast ==
- Leslie Nielsen as William Joel Partain
- Colleen Miller as Irene Partain
- Edward Andrews as Deputy Lou Follett
- Jay C. Flippen as Oren Kobble
- James Best as Kermit
- Paul Richards as Elly Horn
- Robert J. Wilke as Tom Ellis
- Claude Akins as Truck Driver
- Marianne Stewart as Ruth Childers
- Paul Wexler as the "Lean Man"

== Box office ==
According to MGM records, the film earned $250,000 in the U.S. and Canada and $250,000 in other markets, resulting in a loss to the studio of $110,000.
