= Step Down to Terror =

1958 film by Harry Keller

- Film poster by Reynold Brown
- Directed by: Harry Keller
- Written by: Mel Dinelli; Czenzi Ormonde; Sy Gomberg
- Based on: story Uncle Charlie by Gordon McDonnell
- Produced by: Joseph Gershenson
- Starring: Colleen Miller; Charles Drake; Rod Taylor
- Cinematography: Russell Metty
- Edited by: Frank Gross
- Production company: Universal Pictures
- Distributed by: Universal Pictures
- Release date: September 1958 (United States)
- Running time: 76 minutes
- Country: United States
- Language: English

Step Down to Terror (also known as The Silent Stranger) is a 1958 American film noir directed by Harry Keller and starring Colleen Miller, Charles Drake and Rod Taylor. It is a remake of the 1943 Alfred Hitchcock film Shadow of a Doubt.

== Plot ==
Johnny Williams is a psychotic serial killer who returns to his hometown to visit his mother and widowed sister-in-law Helen, who do not know of his criminal past. Johnny hopes to settle in town and start a new life, but Helen's suspicions are aroused by detective Mike Randall, who believes that the killer may be Johnny. When Helen notices that the initials on a signet ring that Johnny claims to have won in a card game match those of a recent murder victim, she is convinced of his guilt.

Mike is informed that the serial killer has been apprehended on the East Coast and tells Helen that she can now relax. However, Helen remains deeply suspicious of Johnny, who tries to persuade Helen to keep her mouth shut. He methodically plots her murder and slips poison into her drink. She begins to feel faint and Johnny leaves her for dead in order to attend a ceremony with his next victim. Mike, who had asked Helen for a date, becomes concerned and rushes to the house. A doctor is able to save Helen's life. She appears at the ceremony and startles Johnny, who thinks that she is dead.

Johnny later drags Helen into his car and drives away. Knowing Johnny is going to kill her, Helen suddenly grabs the keys, forcing Johnny to swerve to avoid hitting a boy riding a bike, and Johnny is killed in the resulting accident. At the memorial service, as Johnny is lauded as a model citizen, but only Helen, her arm in a sling, and Mike know the truth.

== Cast ==
- Colleen Miller as Helen Walters
- Charles Drake as Johnny Williams Walters
- Rod Taylor as Mike Randall
- Josephine Hutchinson as Sarah Walters
- Jocelyn Brando as Lily Kirby
- Alan Dexter as Roy
- Ricky Kelman as Doug Walters

== Production ==
At one stage, Ross Hunter was set to produce the film and Donna Reed was assigned the lead female role.

== See also ==
- List of American films of 1958
- Remakes of films by Alfred Hitchcock
