= Kelly and Me =

1957 film by Robert Zigler Leonard

- Theatrical release poster
- Directed by: Robert Z. Leonard
- Written by: Everett Freeman
- Produced by: Robert Arthur
- Starring: Van Johnson; Piper Laurie; Lucien Littlefield (uncredited)Martha Hyer; Onslow Stevens; Herbert Anderson; Douglas Fowley; Frank Wilcox
- Cinematography: Maury Gertsman
- Edited by: Ted J. Kent
- Music by: Henry Mancini
- Production company: Universal Pictures
- Distributed by: Universal Pictures
- Release date: April 10, 1957
- Running time: 86 minutes
- Country: United States
- Language: English

Kelly and Me is a 1957 American comedy film directed by Robert Z. Leonard and written by Everett Freeman. The film stars Van Johnson, Piper Laurie, Martha Hyer, Onslow Stevens, Herbert Anderson, Douglas Fowley and Frank Wilcox. The film was released on April 10, 1957, by Universal Pictures.

== Plot ==
Len Carmody, a failure in theatrical venues, finds success in talking films when he finds a trained dog.

== Cast ==
- Van Johnson as Len Carmody
- Piper Laurie as Mina Van Runkel
- Martha Hyer as Lucy Castle
- Onslow Stevens as Walter Van Runkel
- Herbert Anderson as Ben Collins
- Douglas Fowley as Dave Gans
- Frank Wilcox as George Halderman
- Dan Riss as Stu Baker
- Maurice Manson as Mr. Johnson
- Gregory Gaye as Milo
- Yvonne Peattie as Miss Boyle
- Elizabeth Flournoy as Miss Wilk
- Lyle Latell as Joe Webb
