= The Body Disappears =

1941 film

- Lobby card
- Directed by: D. Ross Lederman
- Screenplay by: Scott Darling; and Erna Lazarus
- Produced by: Ben Stoloff (associate producer); Bryan Foy (uncredited)
- Starring: Jeffrey Lynn; Jane Wyman; Edward Everett Horton; Herbert Anderson
- Cinematography: Allen G. Siegler, A.S.C.
- Edited by: Frederick Richards
- Music by: Howard Jackson
- Production company: Warner Bros. – First National Pictures
- Distributed by: Warner Bros. Pictures
- Release date: December 6, 1941
- Running time: 72 minutes
- Country: United States
- Language: English

The Body Disappears is a 1941 American comedy film directed by D. Ross Lederman and starring Jeffrey Lynn, Jane Wyman, Edward Everett Horton and Herbert Anderson. It was produced and distributed by Warner Bros. Pictures as a second feature.

== Plot ==
Unconscious after his bachelor party, Peter DeHaven (Jeffrey Lynn) is transported by his friends to the college dissecting room as a practical joke. Professor Shotesbury (Edward Everett Horton) mistakenly injects him with a serum that makes him invisible. While invisible, DeHaven learns that his fiancée, Christine (Marguerite Chapman), is only marrying him for his money. He also falls in love with Shotesbury's daughter, Joan (Jane Wyman). Meanwhile, Shotesbury is committed to a sanatorium by his colleagues for his claims about invisible monkeys and men. DeHaven and Joan, by this time also invisible, go to release Shotesbury from the mental hospital, which they achieve by making him invisible as well. All the while time is running out for DeHaven to receive an antidote. In the end, all receive the antidote, and DeHaven ends up with Joan. However, Shotesbury's servant Willie suddenly becomes invisible upon sitting down in the witness chair.

== Cast ==
- Jeffrey Lynn as Peter DeHaven
- Jane Wyman as Joan Shotesbury
- Edward Everett Horton as Professor Shotesbury
- Herbert Anderson as "Doc" George Appleby
- Marguerite Chapman as Christine Lunceford
- Craig Stevens as Robert Struck
- David Bruce as Jimmie Barbour
- Willie Best as Willie
- Ivan Simpson as Dean Claxton
- Michael Ames as Bill
- DeWolf Hopper as Terrence Abbott
- Natalie Schafer as Mrs. Lunceford
- Charles Halton as Professor Moggs
- Sidney Bracy as Barrett
- Wade Boteler as Inspector Deming

Uncredited (in order of appearance)
| Jack Mower | court clerk at Doc Appleby's testimony |
| John Hamilton | judge listening to Doc Appleby's testimony |
| Charles Drake | Arthur, attendee at Peter's bachelor party |
| Hank Mann | janitor at Professor Shotesbury's college |
| Roland Drew | producer of play |
| George Meeker | producer of play |
| Dick Elliott | producer of play |
| Eddie Kane | stage manager of play |
| Leslie Brooks | bridesmaid in play |
| Wedgwood Nowell | faculty member at Professor Shotesbury's college |
| Houseley Stevenson | faculty member at Professor Shotesbury's college |
| Frank Ferguson | Professor McAuley, faculty member at Professor Shotesbury's college |
| Romaine Callender | Professor Barkley, faculty member at Professor Shotesbury's college |
| Creighton Hale | Professor Edwards, faculty member at Professor Shotesbury's college |
| Eddy Chandler | police desk sergeant |
| Stuart Holmes | headwaiter in restaurant |
| Glen Cavender | waiter in restaurant |
| Frank Sully | attendant at rest home |
| Harry Lewis | elevator operator at Professor Shotesbury's college |
| John Dilson | Dr. Jasper at rest home |
| Saul Gorss | rest home attendant |
| Vera Lewis | Mrs. Moggs |
| Paul Stanton | prosecutor at hearing for Professor Shotesbury |

== Critical reception ==
Writing in AllMovie, critic Hal Erickson described the film as "an agreeably daffy comedy with science-fiction undertones," having "all manner of looney complications" and "still fresh and funny after nearly six decades." A review of the film in TV Guide described it as a "funny B movie" with "fine special effects [that] highlight this variation of the 'invisible man' theme," noting further that "Horton and wide-eyed Best [give] fine comic performances." Critic Dennis Schwartz described the film as a "delightful screwball comedy" and "the kind of old-fashioned comedy that can cheer you up with a few laughs if you are down, or if you are in a silly mood make you feel even sillier."

== Bibliography ==
- Dick, Bernard F. The President’s Ladies: Jane Wyman and Nancy Davis. Univ. Press of Mississippi, 2014.
