= The Secret Mark of D'Artagnan =

- Directed by: Siro Marcellini
- Written by: Ottavio Poggi; Milton Krims
- Starring: George Nader; Magali Noël
- Cinematography: Alvaro Mancori
- Edited by: Roberto Cinquini
- Music by: Carlo Rustichelli
- Release date: 1962
- Running time: 92
- Language: Italian

The Secret Mark of D'Artagnan (Italian: Il colpo segreto di D'Artagnan, French: Le secret de d'Artagnan) is a 1962 Italian-French adventure film written and directed by Siro Marcellini and starring George Nader and Magali Noël.

The film is about the adventures of D'Artagnan in the year 1632, between The Three Musketeers and Twenty Years After.

== Cast ==
- George Nader as D'Artagnan
- Magali Noël as Carlotta
- Georges Marchal as Duke of Montersant
- Alessandra Panaro as Diana
- Mario Petri as Porthos
- Massimo Serato as Cardinal Richelieu
- Franco Fantasia as Duke of Savignac
- Giulio Marchetti as King Louis XIII
- Piero Pastore as Conspirator
- Raf Baldassarre
- Tullio Altamura
