= The Great Space Adventure =

- Directed by: Albert Zugsmith
- Starring: George Nader
- Release date: 1963
- Countries: United States; Philippines
- Language: English

The Great Space Adventure is a 1963 film from Albert Zugsmith starring George Nader and Fay Spain.

Nader was signed in January 1963. The film was shot in the Philippines.

== Production ==
Produced by Famous Players Corporation
