= Gunfight at Comanche Creek =

1963 film by Frank McDonald

- Film poster
- Directed by: Frank McDonald
- Screenplay by: Edward Bernds
- Produced by: Ben Schwalb
- Starring: Audie Murphy
- Narrated by: Reed Hadley
- Cinematography: Joseph F. Biroc
- Edited by: William Austin
- Music by: Marlin Skiles
- Color process: Color by Deluxe
- Production company: Allied Artists Pictures
- Distributed by: Allied Artists Pictures
- Release date: November 6, 1963
- Running time: 91 minutes
- Country: United States
- Language: English

Gunfight at Comanche Creek is a 1963 American Western film directed by Frank McDonald and starring Audie Murphy. It is an uncredited remake of Last of the Badmen, an Allied Artists Pictures film from 1957.

== Plot ==
A gang of Colorado bank robbers led by Amos Troop uses a technique where they break prisoners out of jail, use them to commit crimes, then later kill them to collect the reward. A detective, Gifford, goes undercover with the gang to bring them to justice.

Saloon owner Abbie Stevens takes a liking to Gifford while he infiltrates the gang. So does a young outlaw, Kid Carter, who goes to the town's marshal to get help for Gifford, only to discover the marshal's actually the ringleader of the gang. Help arrives in the nick of time; the marshal and Troop are arrested and the rest killed in a shootout.

== Cast ==
- Audie Murphy as Bob Gifford aka Judd Tanner
- Ben Cooper as Carter
- Colleen Miller as Abbie Stevens
- De Forest Kelley as Amos Troop
- Jan Merlin as Nielson
- Adam Williams as Jed Hayden
- Susan Seaforth as Jamie
- Mort Mills as Ben Brady
- John Hubbard as Marshal Shearer
- John Milford as Bill Peters
- Michael Mikler as Rene Waller
- Thomas Browne Henry as Mike O'Bryant
- William Wellman Jr. as Day
- Laurie Mitchell as Tina Neville
- Tim Graham as Stage Driver
- Eddie Quillan as Hotel Clerk
