= Judson Philips =

American novelist

Judson Pentecost Philips (August 10, 1903 – March 7, 1989) was an American writer who wrote more than 100 mystery and detective novels under the pseudonyms Hugh Pentecost and Philip Owen, as well as under his own name. As Judson Philips, he also wrote numerous pulp sports novels in the 1930s.

== Biography ==
Philips was born in Northfield, Massachusetts, and traveled widely before completing his education and graduating from Columbia University in 1925.

Philips started writing short stories for pulp fiction magazines in the 1920s and 1930s. He also wrote plays and a newspaper column.

He was a prolific mystery writer, especially under the Hugh Pentecost moniker. His novels benefited from strong characterization, fair play with the reader, and unstilted language. He created several series characters, most of them "amateur" sleuths. Perhaps the best known is Pierre Chambrun, the suave manager of a New York luxury hotel who often has to solve murders among the rich and famous.

In 1973, Philips received the Grand Master Award, the highest honor bestowed by the Mystery Writers of America.

An entertaining conversationalist and raconteur, he was well respected in his community and in his literary genre. In 1950, he helped found the Sharon Playhouse, where he served as a producer and adviser. In the mid-1960s he hosted a program about events in Connecticut's "Northwest Corner" on radio station WTOR in Torrington, CT which attracted a following.

Phillips died of complications from emphysema in 1989, at age 85, in Canaan, Connecticut. He was survived by his wife, Norma Burton Philips; three sons and a daughter.

== Published works ==
=== As Judson Philips ===
==== Journalist Peter Styles series ====
1. Laughter Trap. Dodd, Mead and Company 1964
2. Black Glass City. Dodd Mead 1965
3. The Twisted People. Dodd Mead 1965
4. Wings of Madness. Dodd Mead 1966
5. Thursday's Folly. Dodd Mead 1967
6. Hot Summer Killing. Dodd Mead 1968
7. Nightmare at Dawn. Dodd Mead 1970
8. Escape a Killer. Dodd Mead 1971, ISBN 978-0-396-06313-1
9. The Vanishing Senator. Dodd Mead 1972, ISBN 978-0-396-06579-1
10. Larkspur Conspiracy. Dodd Mead 1973, ISBN 978-0-396-06837-2
11. The Power Killers. Dodd Mead 1974, ISBN 978-0-396-06979-9
12. Walked a Crooked Mile. Dodd Mead 1975, ISBN 978-0-396-07137-2
13. Backlash. Dodd Mead 1976, ISBN 978-0-396-07330-7
14. Five Roads to Death. Dodd Mead 1977, ISBN 978-0-396-07472-4
15. Why Murder. Dodd Mead 1979, ISBN 978-0-396-07683-4
16. Death is a Dirty Trick. Dodd Mead 1980, ISBN 978-0-396-07820-3
17. Murder as the Curtain Rises. Dodd Mead 1981, ISBN 978-0-396-07954-5
18. Target for Tragedy. Dodd Mead 1982, ISBN 978-0-396-08079-4

==== The Old Towne Detective Agency series ====
- The Death Syndicate . Triangle Books 1938
- Death Delivers a Postcard . Triangle Books 1940

==== Standalones ====
- Red War. Doubleday (publisher) 1936, co-author Thomas M. Johnson
- Murder in Marble: a Detective Story. Dodd Mead 1940, also Handi-Book
- Odds on the Hot Seat. Dodd Mead 1941, also Handi-Book
- The Fourteenth Trump. Dodd Mead 1942, also Handi-Book
- Killer on the Catwalk. Dodd Mead 1959
- Whisper Town. Victor Gollancz Ltd 1960
- A Dead Ending. Dodd Mead 1962
- The Dead Can't Love. Dodd Mead 1963
- Murder Arranged. Dodd Mead 1978, ISBN 978-0-396-07591-2

=== As Hugh Pentecost ===
==== Lt. Luke Bradley series ====
1. Cancelled in Red. Dodd Mead 1939
2. Twenty-Fourth Horse. Dodd Mead 1940
3. I'll Sing at Your Funeral. Dodd Mead 1942
4. The Brass Chills. Dodd Mead 1943

==== Dr. John Smith series ====
1. Memory of Murder. Ziff Davis Inc. 1946, four novellas: 'Memory of Murder'; 'Secret Corridors'; 'Volcano'; 'Fear Unlocked'
2. Where the Snow was Red. Dodd Mead 1949
3. Shadow of Madness. Dodd Mead 1950

==== Lt. Pascal series ====
1. Lieutenant Pascal's Tastes in Homicide. Dodd Mead 1954, collection of stories
2. The Obituary Club. Dodd Mead 1958
3. The Lonely Target. Dodd Mead 1959
4. Only the Rich Die Young. Dodd Mead 1964

==== Uncle George series ====
1. Choice of Violence. Dodd Mead 1961
2. Murder Sweet and Sour. Dodd Mead 1965
3. Around Dark Corners. Dodd Mead 1970, collection of stories
4. The Copycat Killers. Dodd Mead 1983, ISBN 978-0-396-08183-8
5. Price of Silence. Dodd Mead 1984, ISBN 978-0-396-08406-8
6. Death by Fire. Dodd Mead 1986, ISBN 978-0-396-08826-4
7. Pattern for Terror. Carroll & Graf Publishers 1990, ISBN 978-0-88184-519-8

==== Hotel Manager Pierre Chambrun ====
1. The Cannibal Who Overate. Dodd Mead 1962
2. The Shape of Fear. Boardman Books 1963
3. The Evil that Men Do. Boardman 1966
4. The Golden Trap. Dodd Mead 1967
5. The Gilded Nightmare. Dodd Mead 1968
6. Girl Watcher's Funeral. Dodd Mead 1969
7. The Deadly Joke. Dodd Mead 1971, ISBN 978-0-396-06331-5
8. Birthday, Deathday. Dodd Mead 1972, ISBN 978-0-396-06523-4
9. Walking Dead Man. Dodd Mead 1973, ISBN 978-0-396-06779-5
10. Bargain with Death. Dodd Mead 1974, ISBN 978-0-396-06919-5
11. Time of Terror. Dodd Mead 1975, ISBN 978-0-396-07123-5
12. The Fourteen Dilemma. Dodd Mead 1976, ISBN 978-0-396-07287-4
13. Death After Breakfast. Dodd Mead 1978, ISBN 978-0-396-07554-7
14. Random Killer. Dodd Mead 1979, ISBN 9780440172109
15. Beware Young Lovers. Dodd Mead 1980, ISBN 978-0-396-07808-1
16. Murder in Luxury. Dodd Mead 1981, ISBN 978-0-396-07921-7
17. With Intent to Kill, Dodd Mead 1982, ISBN 978-0-396-08042-8
18. Murder in High Places. Dodd Mead 1983, ISBN 978-0-396-08146-3
19. Remember to Kill Me. Dodd Mead 1984, ISBN 978-0-396-08309-2
20. Murder Round the Clock. Dodd Mead 1985, ISBN 978-0-396-08553-9
21. Nightmare Time. Dodd Mead 1986, ISBN 978-0-396-08793-9
22. Murder Goes Round and Round. Dodd Mead 1988, ISBN 978-0-396-08952-0

==== John Jericho series ====
1. The Sniper. Dodd Mead 1965
2. Hide Her from Every Eye. Dodd Mead 1966
3. The Creeping Hours. Dodd Mead 1966
4. Dead Woman of the Year. Dodd Mead 1967
5. Girl with Six Fingers. Dodd Mead 1969
6. Plague of Violence. Dodd Mead 1970, ISBN 978-0-396-06246-2
7. The Battles of Jericho. Crippen & Landru, 2008. Short stories

==== Julian Quist series ====
1. Don't Drop Dead Tomorrow. Dodd Mead 1971, ISBN 978-0-396-06389-6
2. Champagne Killer. Dodd Mead 1972, ISBN 978-0-396-06611-8
3. Beautiful Dead. Dodd Mead 1973, ISBN 978-0-396-06865-5
4. The Judas Freak. Dodd Mead 1974, ISBN 978-0-396-07001-6
5. Honeymoon with Death. Dodd Mead 1975, ISBN 978-0-396-07212-6
6. Die After Dark. Dodd Mead 1976, ISBN 978-0-396-07345-1
7. Steel Palace. Dodd Mead 1977, ISBN 978-0-396-07491-5
8. Deadly Trap. Dodd Mead 1978, ISBN 978-0-396-07606-3
9. Homicidal Horse. Dodd Mead 1979, ISBN 978-0-396-07724-4
10. The Death Mask. Dodd Mead 1980, ISBN 978-0-396-07883-8
11. Sow Death, Reap Death. Dodd Mead 1981, ISBN 978-0-396-08006-0
12. Past, Present and Murder. Dodd Mead 1982, ISBN 978-0-396-08103-6
13. Murder out of Wedlock. Dodd Mead 1983, ISBN 978-0-396-08215-6
14. Substitute Victim. Dodd Mead 1984, ISBN 978-0-396-08407-5
15. The Party Killer. Dodd Mead 1986, ISBN 978-0-396-08692-5
16. Kill and Kill Again. Dodd Mead 1987, ISBN 978-0-396-08898-1

==== Standalones ====
- Cat and Mouse. Chicago Royce Publishers 1940
- Chinese Nightmare. Dell Publishing 1947
- The Assassins. Dodd Mead 1955
- Kingdom of Death. Dodd Mead 1960
- The Deadly Friend. Dodd Mead 1961
- Murder Clear Track Fast. Dodd Mead 1961
- The Tarnished Angel. Dodd Mead 1963
- Day the Children Vanished. Pocket Books 1976, ISBN 978-0-671-80981-2
- Murder as Usual. Dodd Mead 1977, ISBN 978-0-396-07408-3

==== Anthologies ====
- Death Wears a Copper Necktie: and other stories. Walter Edwards Company 1946
- Alfred Hitchcock's Daring Detectives. Random House 1969, ISBN 978-0-394-81490-2

=== as Philip Owen ===
- Mystery at a Country Inn. Berkshire Press 1979, ISBN 978-0-912944-54-8
