= Charles Drake (actor) =

American actor (1917-1994)

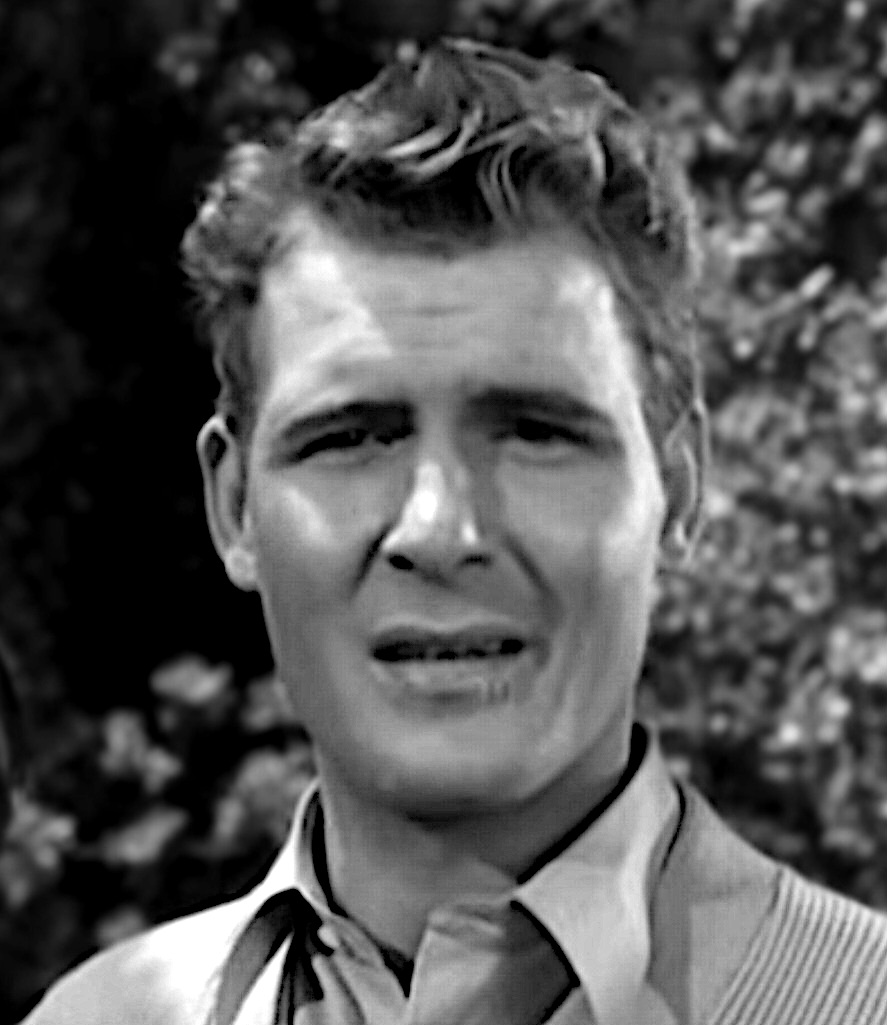
- Drake in Winning Your Wings (1942)
- Born: Charles Ruppert; October 2, 1917; New York City, U.S.
- Died: September 10, 1994 (aged 76); East Lyme, Connecticut, U.S.
- Education: Nichols College
- Occupation: Actor
- Years active: 1939–1976

Charles Drake (born Charles Ruppert; October 2, 1917 – September 10, 1994) was an American actor.

== Biography ==
Drake was born in New York City. He graduated from Nichols College and became a salesman. In 1939, he turned to acting and signed a contract with Warner Bros., but he was not immediately successful. Drake served in the U.S. Army during World War II. Drake returned to Hollywood in 1945 and was cast in Conflict which starred Humphrey Bogart. His contract with Warner Brothers eventually ended. In the 1940s, he did some freelance film work, including A Night in Casablanca (1946) starring the Marx Brothers.

In 1949, he moved to Universal Studios, where he co-starred with James Stewart and Shelley Winters in Winchester '73 (1950) and again co-starred with Stewart in the film Harvey (1950), a screen adaptation of the Broadway play. He co-starred in the Audie Murphy biopic To Hell and Back (1955), as Murphy's close friend, "Brandon".

In 1955, Drake turned to television as one of the stock-company players on Montgomery's Summer Stock, a summer replacement for Robert Montgomery Presents, and from 1957 he hosted the syndicated TV espionage weekly Schilling Playhouse (also known as Rendezvous). In 1956 Drake appeared as Tom Sweeny with Murphy and Anne Bancroft in Walk the Proud Land.

Drake teamed again with Audie Murphy, for the Western film No Name on the Bullet (1959), which featured Murphy in a rare villainous role as a hired assassin and Drake playing a small-town doctor trying to stop his reign of terror.

On November 14, 1961, Drake played state line boss Allen Winter in the episode "The Accusers" of NBC's Laramie Western series. On February 6, 1963, Drake played Hollister in the Wagon Train episode "The Hollister John Garrison Story". He also played Charles Maury in "The Charles Maury Story" in 1958, Season 1, episode 32.

Drake played the part of Oliver Greer in The Fugitive episode "The One That Got Away" (1967). He guest-starred in the fourth season (1968–1969) of NBC's Daniel Boone as Simon Jarvis. In 1969, Drake appeared as Milo Cantrell on the TV series The Virginian in the episode titled "A Woman of Stone." In 1970, he appeared as Randolf in "The Men From Shiloh" (the rebranded name of The Virginian) in the episode titled "Jenny." He played in eighty-three films between 1939 and 1975, including Scream, Pretty Peggy. More than fifty were dramas, but he also acted in comedies, science fiction, horror, and film noir. In an episode of the original Star Trek series ("The Deadly Years", 1967), Drake guest-starred as Commodore Stocker.

Drake died on September 10, 1994, in East Lyme, Connecticut, at the age of 76.

== Selected filmography ==
- Career (1939) - Rex Chaney
- Conspiracy (1939) - Police Guard (uncredited)
- The Hunchback of Notre Dame (1939) - Young Priest (uncredited)
- I Wanted Wings (1941) - Cadet (uncredited)
- Affectionately Yours (1941) - Hospital Intern (uncredited)
- Million Dollar Baby (1941) - Pamela's First Dance Partner (uncredited)
- Out of the Fog (1941) - Reporter (uncredited)
- Sergeant York (1941) - Scorer (uncredited)
- Dive Bomber (1941) - Pilot (uncredited)
- Navy Blues (1941) - Sea bag Inspection Officer (uncredited)
- Nine Lives Are Not Enough (1941) - 'Snappy' Lucas
- One Foot in Heaven (1941) - Second Bridegroom (uncredited)
- The Maltese Falcon (1941) - Reporter (uncredited)
- The Body Disappears (1941) - Arthur (scenes deleted)
- Dangerously They Live (1941) - Joe, Hospital Orderly with Dr. Murdock (uncredited)
- You're in the Army Now (1941) - Private (uncredited)
- The Man Who Came to Dinner (1942) - Sandy
- Bullet Scars (1942) - Harry a Reporter (uncredited)
- The Male Animal (1942) - Student (uncredited)
- Larceny, Inc. (1942) - R.V. Boyce - Driver in Accident (uncredited)
- Yankee Doodle Dandy (1942) - (uncredited)
- Wings for the Eagle (1942) - Customer (uncredited)
- The Gay Sisters (1942) - Man Entering Courtroom (uncredited)
- Busses Roar (1942) - Eddie Sloan
- Across the Pacific (1942) - Officer (uncredited)
- Now, Voyager (1942) - Leslie Trotter (uncredited)
- The Hard Way (1943) - Trailer Narrator (uncredited)
- Air Force (1943) - Navigator
- Conflict (1945) - Prof. Norman Holsworth
- You Came Along (1945) - Lt. R. Janoschek
- Whistle Stop (1946) - Ernie
- Winter Wonderland (1946) - Steve Kirk
- A Night in Casablanca (1946) - Lt. Pierre Delmar
- The Pretender (1947) - Dr. Leonard G. Koster
- The Tender Years (1948) - Bob Wilson
- The Babe Ruth Story (1948) - Reporter (uncredited)
- Tarzan's Magic Fountain (1949) - Mr. Dodd
- Johnny Stool Pigeon (1949) - Hotel Clerk (uncredited)
- Comanche Territory (1950) - Stacey Howard
- I Was a Shoplifter (1950) - Herb Klaxon
- Louisa (1950) - Voice of Radio Broadcaster (uncredited)
- Winchester '73 (1950) - Steve Miller
- Peggy (1950) - Tom Fielding
- Deported (1950) - Voice of Customs Official (uncredited)
- Mystery Submarine (1950) - Commodore (voice, uncredited)
- Harvey (1950) - Dr. Raymond Sanderson
- Air Cadet (1951) - Captain Sullivan
- The Fat Man (1951) - Radio Broadcaster at Racetrack (voice, uncredited)
- Little Egypt (1951) - Oliver Doane
- You Never Can Tell (1951) - Perry Collins
- The Treasure of Lost Canyon (1952) - Jim Anderson
- Red Ball Express (1952) - Pvt. Ronald Partridge / Narrator
- Bonzo Goes to College (1952) - Malcolm Drew
- Gunsmoke (1953) - Johnny Lake
- The Lone Hand (1953) - George Hadley
- It Came from Outer Space (1953) - Sheriff Matt Warren
- War Arrow (1953) - Sgt. Luke Schermerhorn
- The Glenn Miller Story (1954) - Don Haynes
- Tobor the Great (1954) - Dr. Ralph Harrison
- Four Guns to the Border (1954) - Jim Flannery
- To Hell and Back (1955) - Brandon
- Female on the Beach (1955) - Police Lieutenant Galley
- All That Heaven Allows (1955) - Mick Anderson
- The Price of Fear (1956) - Police Sgt. Pete Carroll
- Walk the Proud Land (1956) - Tom Sweeny
- Jeanne Eagels (1957) - John Donahue
- Until They Sail (1957) - Capt. Richard Bates
- Step Down to Terror (1958) - Johnny Williams Walters
- No Name on the Bullet (1959) - Luke Canfield
- Tammy Tell Me True (1961) - Buford Woodly
- Back Street (1961) - Curt Stanton
- Showdown (1963) - Bert Pickett
- The Lively Set (1964) - Paul Manning
- Dear Heart (1964) - Frank Taylor
- The Third Day (1965) - Lawrence Conway
- The Money Jungle (1967) - Harvey Sheppard
- Valley of the Dolls (1967) - Kevin Gillmore
- The Counterfeit Killer (1968) - Dolan
- The Swimmer (1968) - Howard Graham
- Hail, Hero! (1969) - Senator Murchiston
- The Arrangement (1969) - Finnegan
- The Seven Minutes (1971) - Sgt. Kellogg
- The Screaming Woman (1972, TV Movie) - Ken Bronson
- Scream, Pretty Peggy (1973, TV Movie) - George Thornton
- The Lives of Jenny Dolan (1975, TV Movie) - Alan Hardesty
- My Brother's Wedding (1983) - Pastor #2 (final film role)
