= Anzio (film) =

1968 film by Edward Dmytryk, Duilio Coletti

- US film poster by Frank McCarthy
- Directed by: Edward Dmytryk (Note: Duilio Coletti credited as co-director on Italian prints.)
- Written by: HAL Craig; Frank De Felitta; Duilio Coletti; Giuseppe Mangione
- Based on: Anzio (1961 book) by Wynford Vaughan-Thomas
- Produced by: Dino De Laurentiis
- Starring: Robert Mitchum; Peter Falk; Earl Holliman; Mark Damon; Reni Santoni; Thomas Hunter; Anthony Steel; Wade Preston; Arthur Kennedy; Robert Ryan
- Cinematography: Giuseppe Rotunno
- Edited by: Peter Taylor; Alberto Gallitti (Italian version)
- Music by: Riz Ortolani
- Production company: Dino de Laurentiis Cinematografica
- Distributed by: Columbia Pictures
- Release date: July 24, 1968 (U.S.)
- Running time: 118 minutes
- Countries: Italy; United States
- Language: English
- Box office: $1,400,000 (US, Canada)

Anzio (Italian: Lo sbarco di Anzio, lit. 'The Anzio Landings', released in the United Kingdom as The Battle for Anzio) is a 1968 war film directed by Edward Dmytryk and produced by Dino De Laurentiis. It depicts Operation Shingle, the 1944 Allied seaborne assault on the Italian port of Anzio during World War II. The screenplay was adapted from the book Anzio by Wynford Vaughan-Thomas, who had covered the battle as a BBC war correspondent.

The film stars Robert Mitchum, Peter Falk, Robert Ryan and Arthur Kennedy, alongside a range of international actors portraying mostly fictional characters inspired by real participants in the battle. Notable exceptions include Wolfgang Preiss as Field Marshal Albert Kesselring and Tonio Selwart as General Eberhard von Mackensen. Although the production was based in Italy with an Italian crew and producer, none of the principal cast were Italian, and the film includes no major Italian characters.

Anzio was released by Columbia Pictures on July 24, 1968, to a mixed reception.

== Plot ==
After meeting American general Jack Lesley, war correspondent Dick Ennis is assigned to accompany US Army Rangers for the upcoming attempt to outflank the tough enemy defenses. The amphibious landing is unopposed, but Lesley is cautious, preferring to fortify his beachhead before advancing inland. Ennis and a Ranger named Pvt. Movie drive in a jeep through the countryside, picking up a Black Devil named Corporal Jack Rabinoff along the way, and together, they discover there are few Germans between the beachhead and Rome, but this information is ignored. As a result, the German commander, Kesselring, is able to gather his forces and launch an effective counterattack.

Ennis is with the Rangers and Rabinoff - who's acting as a guide - who are ambushed at the Battle of Cisterna, resulting in heavy casualties. Ennis, Rabinoff, Movie, T/Sgt. Abe Stimmler, and Pvts. Wally Richardson, Doyle, Andy and Cellini manage to escape to a ruined church, and then through a minefield as a tank chases them. After reaching safety on a hill, Ennis radios the news of the disaster back to Lesley at the beachhead calling it another costly failure in judgment by the brass. The eight men take cover in the woods, before discovering the Germans building a new defensive line, with forced labourers. The men all split up to find out more, but the following morning, Richardson is killed after getting caught.

The following night, the seven remaining men take shelter in a house occupied by three Italian women. A German patrol soon arrives at the house only to be slaughtered by the Americans. Throughout this period, Ennis asks what makes one human being willingly kill another. Rabinoff replies that he loves it, having lied to re-enlist after being badly injured in the Pacific, and that combat and war allow him to live more intensely than he otherwise could.

Having almost reached friendly lines, Doyle, Andy, Cellini and Rabinoff are all killed in a shootout with a group of German snipers while Stimmler is wounded. It is during this shootout that Ennis is finally forced to kill one of the Germans with Rabinoff's gun. Afterwards Ennis, Stimmler and Movie make it back and deliver intelligence about the Germans' new defense line. Ennis learns that the too-cautious General Lesley had been relieved of command of the Allied forces at Anzio. Thanks to the behind-enemy-lines information provided by Ennis, the Allies break out of the beachhead at Anzio and General Carson and the Fifth Army race to Rome. They enter the Eternal City and enjoy an enthusiastic victory parade.

== Cast ==
- Robert Mitchum as Dick Ennis, war correspondent
- Peter Falk as Corporal Jack Rabinoff
- Robert Ryan as Lieutenant General Carson (based on Mark W. Clark)
- Earl Holliman as Technical Sergeant Abe Stimmler
- Mark Damon as Private Wally Richardson
- Arthur Kennedy as Major General Jack Lesley (John P. Lucas)
- Wolfgang Preiss as Generalfeldmarschall Albert Kesselring
- Tonio Selwart as Generaloberst Eberhard von Mackensen
- Reni Santoni as Private Movie
- Joseph Walsh as Private Doyle
- Thomas Hunter as Private Andy
- Giancarlo Giannini as Private Cellini
- Arthur Franz as Major General Luke Howard
- Anthony Steel as Major-General Marsh
- Patrick Magee as Major-General Starkey
- Wayde Preston as Colonel Hendricks
- Venantino Venantini as Captain Burns
- Elsa Albani as Emilia
- Annabella Andreoli as Anna
- Stefanella Giovannini as Diana
- Marcella Valeri as Assunta
- Enzo Turco as Pepe
- Elisabeth Tompson as Raffaella
- Wolfgang Hillinger as Hans

== Production ==
Originally, Italian director Duilio Coletti was attached to helm the film. He was replaced during pre-production by Edward Dmytryk, but remained on-board as a second unit director. In Italian prints of the film, Coletti is credited as a director, due to the film's status as an Italian-American co-production.

Shooting took place on-location in Anzio, Taranto, and Rome. A scene shot in the Colosseum was reported as "the biggest scene ever shot in Rome," involving some 3000 actors. Luigi Scaccianoce was the production designer.

Peter Falk thought that the script he read was clichéd and wanted off the film. At the last minute, Dino De Laurentiis put Falk's name above the title billing and gave him his choice of writer for his character's dialogue. Falk stayed and wrote his lines himself. The production saw De Laurentiis bring in for the first time another actor who made a debut, Giancarlo Giannini, who would later do international films and would work with director Lina Wertmüller.

Rabinoff is based on a real 1st Special Service Force soldier, Sgt John L. "Jake" Walkmeister, who ran an illegal brothel of Italian prostitutes in a stolen ambulance. Walkmeister was killed by shrapnel at Port Cros during Operation Dragoon, the invasion of southern France.

In the English-language version, Italian characters speak in Italian, while German commanders are depicted speaking English.

== Music ==
Riz Ortolani scored the film, with a ballad called "This World is Yours" with lyrics by Doc Pomus that was sung beneath the credits by Jack Jones.

== Reception ==
The film opened to mixed reviews in the US; many felt it did not work as well as Dmytryk's early war films. The New York Times film review was generally dismissive, and described the film as "a very ordinary war movie with an epic title, produced by Dino De Laurentiis, the Italian producer... who thinks big but often produces small". In contrast, Chicago Sun-Times critic Roger Ebert had a more favourable opinion of the film, described it as "a good war movie and even an intelligent one". On the review aggregator website Rotten Tomatoes, 67% of 6 critics' reviews are positive.

== See also ==
- List of American films of 1968
