= The Rawhide Years =

1956 film by Rudolph Maté

- Directed by: Rudolph Maté
- Screenplay by: Earl Fenton
- Produced by: Stanley Rubin
- Starring: Tony Curtis; Colleen Miller; Arthur Kennedy
- Cinematography: Irving Glassberg
- Edited by: Russell F. Schoemgarth
- Music by: Hans J. Salter; Frank Skinner
- Color process: Technicolor
- Production company: Universal International Pictures
- Distributed by: Universal Pictures
- Release date: 1956
- Running time: 85 minutes
- Country: United States
- Language: English
- Box office: $1 million (US)

The Rawhide Years is a 1956 American Western film directed by Rudolph Maté and starring Tony Curtis. Colleen Miller and Arthur Kennedy. It was produced and distributed by Universal Pictures.

== Plot ==
Ben Matthews gives up the flashy life of a riverboat gambler, hoping to settle down in Galena with his girlfriend, luscious entertainer Zoe. But, Galena's leading citizen is murdered on the riverboat while on their way. Ben is implicated on arrival and flees, all the while working both sides of the law to clear his name. Three years of wandering later, Zoe's letters stop coming and Ben returns to find her. Encountering Rick Harper, whom he initially takes as a would be bandit, they develop a friendship that winds up with both men saving the other's neck.

== Cast ==
- Tony Curtis as Ben Matthews
- Colleen Miller as Zoe Fontaine
- Arthur Kennedy as Rick Harper
- William Demarest as Brand Comfort
- William Gargan as Marshal Sommers
- Peter van Eyck as Andre Boucher
- Minor Watson as Matt Comfort
- Donald Randolph as Carrico
- Robert Wilke as Neal
- Trevor Bardette as Captain
- James Anderson as Deputy Wade
- Robert Foulk as Mate
- Chubby Johnson as Gif Lessing
- Leigh Snowden as Miss Vanilla Bissell
- Don Beddoe as Frank Porter

== See also ==
- List of American films of 1956
