= Four Guns to the Border =

1954 film by Richard Carlson

- Film poster by Reynold Brown
- Directed by: Richard Carlson
- Screenplay by: George Van Marter; Franklin Coen
- Based on: Louis L'Amour (based on a story by)
- Produced by: William Alland
- Starring: Rory Calhoun; Colleen Miller; George Nader; Walter Brennan; Nina Foch
- Cinematography: Russell Metty
- Edited by: Frank Gross
- Color process: Technicolor
- Production company: Universal-International Pictures
- Distributed by: Universal-International Pictures
- Release date: December 12, 1954
- Running time: 83 minutes
- Country: United States
- Language: English

Four Guns to the Border is a 1954 American Western film directed by Richard Carlson and starring Rory Calhoun, Colleen Miller, George Nader, Walter Brennan and Nina Foch. It was produced and distributed by Universal-International Pictures.

== Plot ==
In 1881, a gang of four bandits have their eye on robbing the bank of Cholla, Arizona. Although several attempts have ended in the town cemetery for previous bank robbers, Cully, the leader, has a plan.

On the run from their latest dud scheme they tangle with Simon Bhumer and his appealing daughter Lolly. Dutch, one of Cully's gang, recognises Simon as a former gunslinger. Now settled down, he is a protective father to his motherless daughter who is just returning from school in Kansas. Young, uninhibited and inexperienced around men Lolly regularly ends rolling around on the ground, tearing her clothing, and getting soaked with water, but she shoots well with a rifle.

The gang move on to their friend and conspirator Greasy's La Tienda general store out in the sticks, and wait for him to turn up from scouting out the town. Later, Simon and Lolly catch up with them there after renegade Apache smoke signals are seen in the hills. In a change to the usual horseplay Lolly becomes a source of attraction for the gang members and indulged with gifts until her father steps in. Cully and Lolly hated each other at first meeting, but now each senses something good in the other. Restless at night they experience an instinctive attraction during a desert rainstorm. The group separate, Simon and Lolly towards their farm at Shadow Valley a few miles from the Mexican border, the gang to the bank robbery. Lolly is overwhelmed by a great urge to return to Cully.

Cully's plan is to ride on ahead into his (reveal) old hometown of Cholla, and have it out with his former friend and rival Jim Flannery, now the town sheriff. Flannery had kicked him out of town some time before and now has married Maggie, Cully's old girlfriend, who'd hoped she'd seen the last of him. As all the townsfolk watch Cully and Jim beat the living daylights out of each other in a grudge match, the others rob the bank without incident or alarm. Heading for the Mexican border, the gang sees that the Apaches are on the warpath and that Greasy has been killed. At the last waterhole before the border Cully has to choose between being safe and rich in Mexico or rescuing Simon and Lolly from an Apache war party. The posse led by Jim Flannery is not far behind. After a lot of shooting, the promise of domesticity triumphs.

== Cast ==
- Rory Calhoun as Cully
- Colleen Miller as Lolly Bhumer
- George Nader as Bronco
- Walter Brennan as Simon Bhumer
- Nina Foch as Maggie Flannery
- John McIntire as Dutch
- Charles Drake as Sheriff Jim Flannery
- Jay Silverheels as Yaqui
- Nestor Paiva as Greasy
- Mary Field as Mrs. Pritchard
- Robert F. Hoy as Smitty (as Robert Hoy)
- Bob Herron as Evans (as Robert Herron)
- Regis Parton as Cashier (as Reg Parton)
- Donald Kerr as Town Loafer
