= Petticoat =

Skirt-like undergarment, sometimes intended to show, worn under a skirt or dress

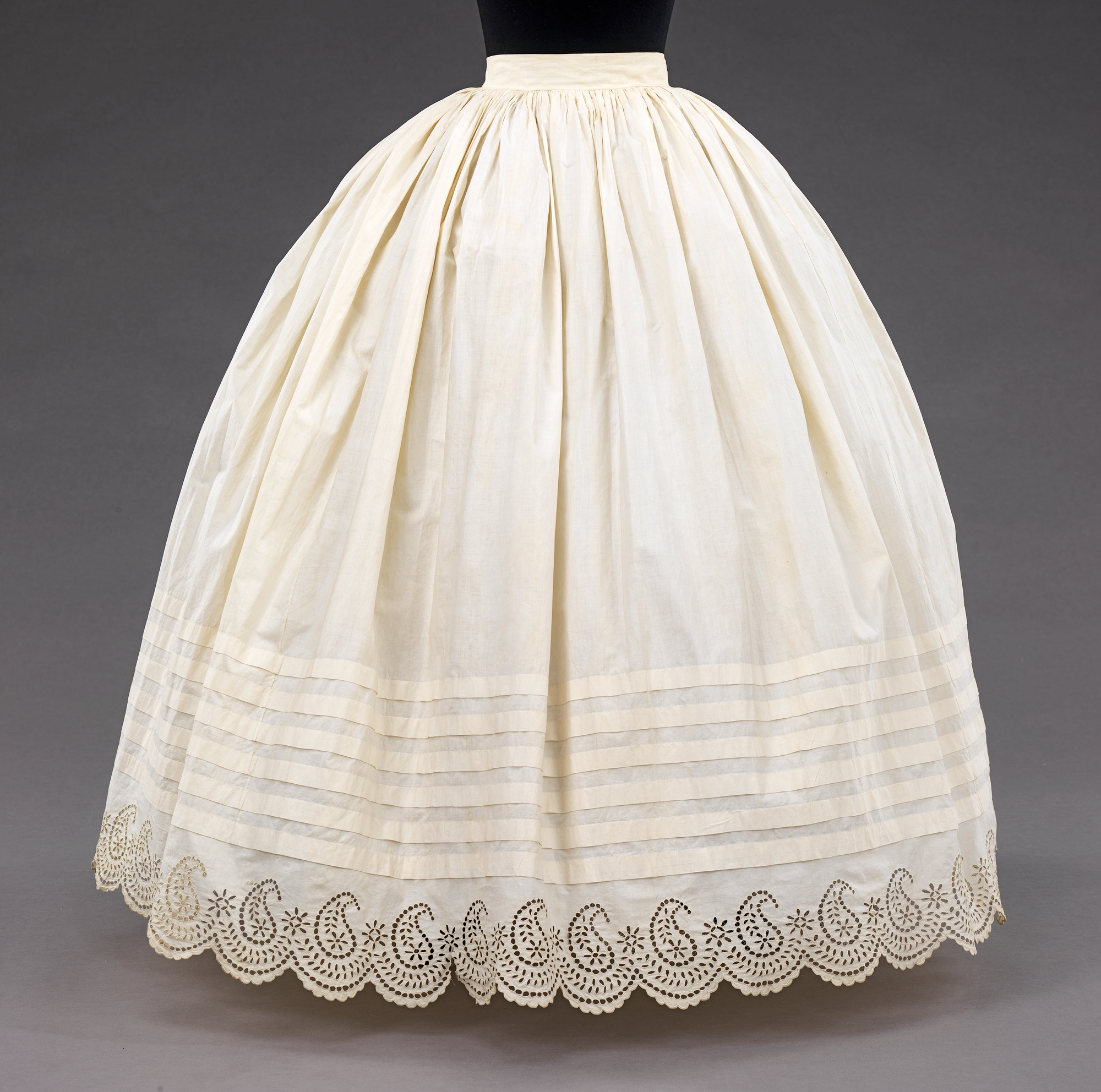
American petticoat, 1855–1865

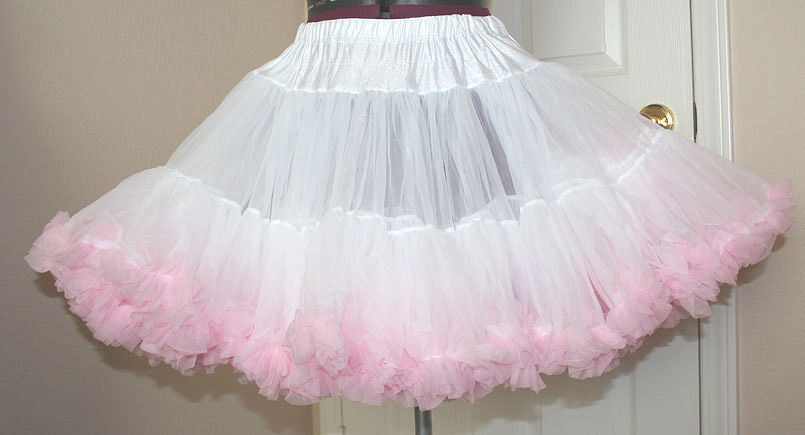
Modern petticoat

A petticoat or underskirt is an article of clothing, a type of undergarment worn under a skirt or a dress. Its precise meaning varies over centuries and between countries.

According to the Oxford English Dictionary, in current British English, a petticoat is "a light loose undergarment ... hanging from the shoulders or waist". In modern American usage, "petticoat" refers only to a garment hanging from the waist. They are most often made of cotton, silk or tulle. Without petticoats, skirts of the 1850s would not have the volume they were known for. In historical contexts (16th to mid-19th centuries), petticoat refers to any separate skirt worn with a gown, bedgown, bodice or jacket; these petticoats are not, strictly speaking, underwear, as they were made to be seen. In both historical and modern contexts, petticoat refers to skirt-like undergarments worn for warmth or to give the skirt or dress the desired attractive shape.

== Terminology ==
Sometimes a petticoat may be called a waist slip or underskirt (UK) or half slip (US), with petticoat restricted to extremely full garments. A chemise hangs from the shoulders. Petticoat can also refer to a full-length slip in the UK, although this usage is somewhat old-fashioned.

== History ==
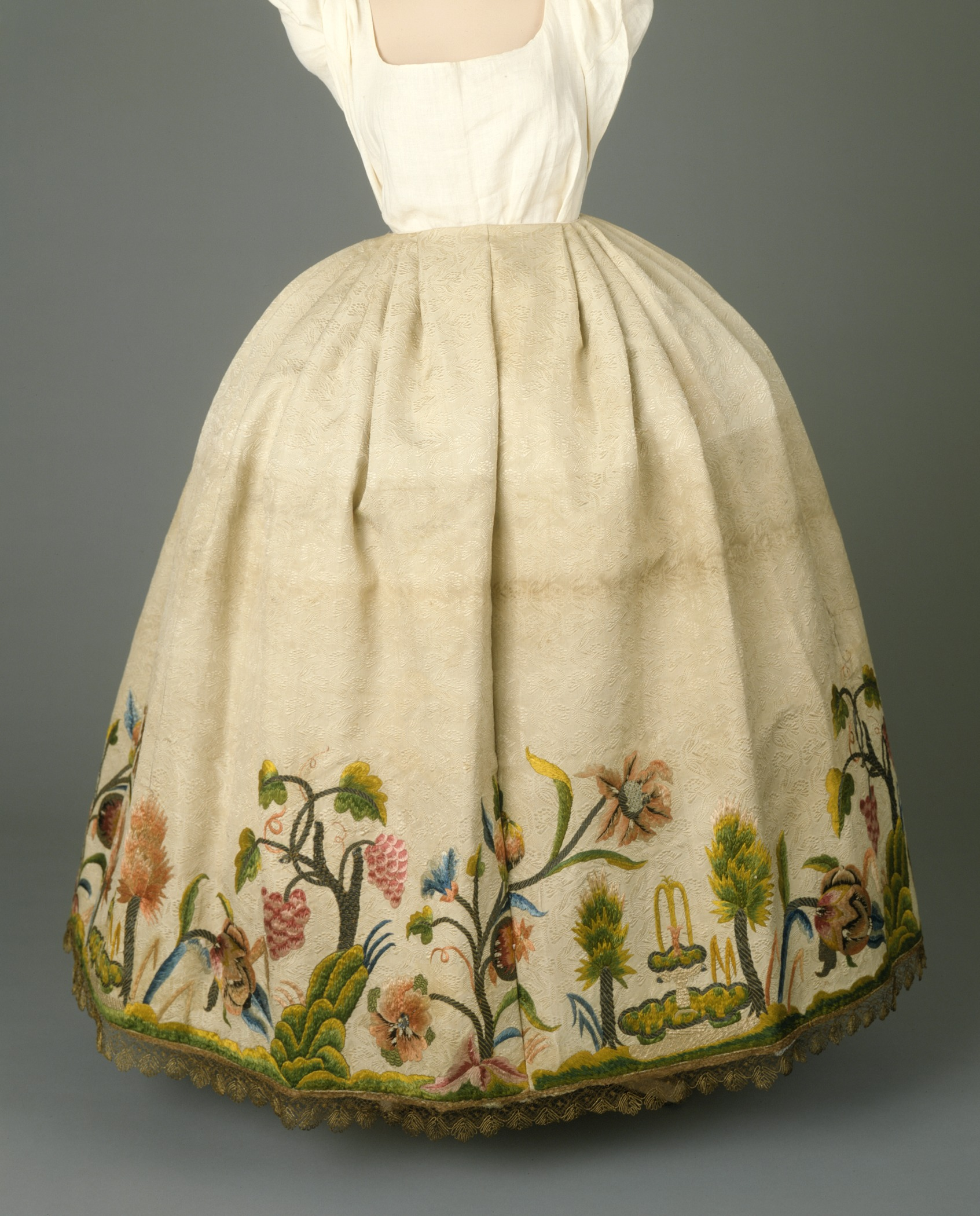
Silk embroidery on petticoat, Portugal, c. 1760

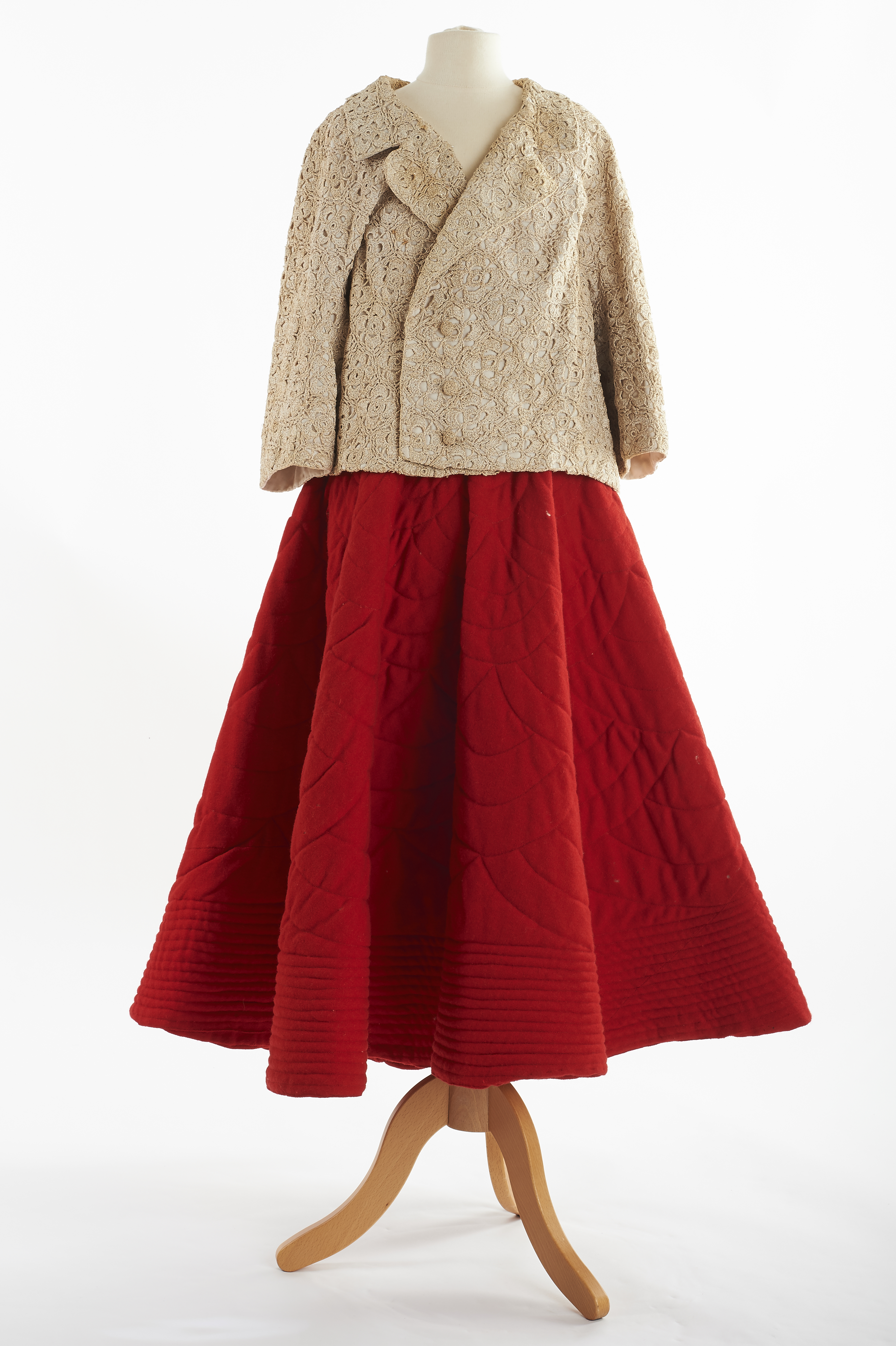
Washer woman petticoat inspired skirt and jacket by Sybil Connolly

In the 14th century, both men and women wore undercoats called "petticotes". The word "petticoat" came from Middle English pety cote or pety coote, meaning "a small coat/cote". Petticoat is also sometimes spelled "petty coat". The original petticoat was meant to be seen and was worn with an open gown. The practice of wearing petticoats as undergarments was well established in England by 1585. In French, petticoats were called jupe. The basquina, worn in Spain, was considered a type of petticoat.

The petticoat in western men’s dress, what would become known in later years develop into the waistcoat, was from the mid-15th century to around the 17th century an under-doublet. The garment was worn in cooler months under a shirt for warmth, and was usually padded or quilted.

In the 18th century in Europe and in America, petticoats were an integral component of a gown, considered a part of the exterior garment and were meant to be seen. The term petticoat was used to refer to such an outer skirt from the 16th to the 19th century, which were fashioned from either matching or contrasting textiles, in simple fabrics, or were highly decoratively embroidered. An underpetticoat was considered an undergarment and was shorter than a regular petticoat. Underpetticoats were also known as a dickey. Also in the American colonies, working women wore shortgowns (bedgowns) over petticoats that normally matched in color. The hem length of a petticoat in the 18th century depended on what was fashionable in dress at the time. Often, petticoats had slits or holes for women to reach pockets inside. Petticoats were worn by all classes of women throughout the 18th century. The style known as polonaise revealed much of the petticoat intentionally.

In the early 19th century, dresses became narrower and simpler with much less lingerie, including "invisible petticoats". Then, as the waltz became popular in the 1820s, full-skirted gowns with petticoats were revived in Europe and the United States.

In the Victorian era, petticoats were cemented as undergarments, used to give bulk and shape to the skirts worn over the petticoat. By the mid 19th century, petticoats were worn over hoops also known as crinoline. Popular white cotton petticoats as an undergarment in the 1860s, for example, regularly featured a lace and broderie anglaise decorative border. As the bustle became popular in the 1870s, petticoats developed flounces towards the back in order to cater for this style of under structure. Petticoats also continued to be worn in layers through this decade. Coloured petticoats came into fashion by the 1890s, with many being made from silk and featuring decorative frills to the bottom edge.

In the early 20th century, petticoats were circular, had flounces and buttons, in which women could attach additional flounces to the garment. Bloomers were also touted as a replacement for petticoats when working and by fashion reformers.

After World War I, silk petticoats were in fashion.

Petticoats were revived by Christian Dior in his full-skirted "New Look" of 1947, and tiered, ruffled, stiffened petticoats remained extremely popular during the 1950s and 1960s. These were sold in a few clothing stores as late as 1970.

Sybil Connolly recalled how a red flannel petticoat, worn by a Connemara woman, inspired her first international fashion collection which took place in New York in 1953. She had travelled to Connemara for inspiration, where she saw a woman wearing a traditional red flannel petticoat. She bought a bolt of the same fabric from the local shop and made it into a quilted evening skirt, which was a huge success at the fashion show. One of these skirts is part of the collection at The Hunt Museum.

== Non-Western petticoats ==
Compared to the Western petticoat, South Asian petticoats are rarely shorter than ankle length and are always worn from the waist down. They may also be called inner skirts or inskirts.

In Japan, similar to a petticoat, a nagajuban (commonly referred to simply as a juban; a hadajuban is sometimes worn underneath a nagajuban) is worn under the kimono as a form of underwear similar in function to the petticoat. The juban resembles a shorter kimono, typically without two half-size front panels (the okumi) and with sleeves only marginally sewn up along the wrist-end. Juban are commonly made of white silk, though historically were typically made of red silk; as the collar of the juban shows underneath the kimono and is worn against the skin, a half-collar (a han'eri) is often sewn to the collar as a protector, and also for decoration. The hadajuban is sometimes worn underneath the juban, and resembles a tube-sleeved kimono-shaped top, without a collar, and an accompanying skirt slip.

== In popular culture ==
The early feminist Mary Wollstonecraft was disparaged by Horace Walpole as a "hyena in petticoats". Florentia Sale was dubbed "the Grenadier in Petticoats" for travelling with her military husband Sir Robert Henry Sale around the British Empire.

The phrase "petticoat government" has referred to women running government or domestic affairs. The phrase is usually applied in a positive tone welcoming female governance of society and home, but occasionally is used to imply a threat to "appropriate" government by males, as was mentioned in several of Henry Fielding's plays. An Irish pamphlet Petticoat Government, Exemplified in a Late Case in Ireland was published in 1780. The American writer Washington Irving used the phrase in Rip Van Winkle (1819). Frances Trollope wrote Petticoat Government: A Novel in 1850. Emma Orczy wrote Petticoat Government, another novel, in 1911. G. K. Chesterton (1874–1936) mentions petticoat in a positive manner; to the idea of female dignity and power in his book What's Wrong With the World (1910) he states:

It is quite certain that the skirt means female dignity, not female submission; it can be proved by the simplest of all tests. No ruler would deliberately dress up in the recognized fetters of a slave; no judge would appear covered with broad arrows. But when men wish to be safely impressive, as judges, priests or kings, they do wear skirts, the long, trailing robes of female dignity. The whole world is under petticoat government; for even men wear petticoats when they wish to govern.

President Andrew Jackson's administration was beset by a scandal called the "Petticoat affair", dramatized in the 1936 film The Gorgeous Hussy. A 1943 comedy film called Petticoat Larceny (cf. petty larceny) depicted a young girl being kidnapped by grifters. In 1955, Iron Curtain politics were satirized in a Bob Hope and Katharine Hepburn film The Iron Petticoat. In the same year Western author Chester William Harrison wrote a short story "Petticoat Brigade" that was turned into the film The Guns of Fort Petticoat in 1957. Blake Edwards filmed a story of an American submarine filled with nurses from the Battle of the Philippines called Operation Petticoat (1959). Petticoat Junction was a CBS TV series that aired in 1963. CBS had another series in the 1966–67 season called Pistols 'n' Petticoats.

== See also ==
- Breeching (boys), a historical practice involving the change of dress from petticoat-like garments to trouser-like ones
- Crinolines and hoop skirts, stiff petticoats made of sturdy material used to extend skirts into a fashionable shape
- Peshgeer
