= Man with a Camera =

American crime drama television series (1958–1960)

- Genre: Crime / Drama
- Written by: James Edmiston; Paul David; Wilton Schiller
- Directed by: Paul Landres; Gerald Mayer
- Starring: Charles Bronson; James Flavin; Ludwig Stössel
- Theme music composer: Herschel Burke Gilbert
- Composer: Leon Klatzin
- Country of origin: United States
- Original language: English
- No. of seasons: 2
- No. of episodes: 29

Production
- Producers: Don W. Sharpe; Warren Lewis; For MWC Productions, Inc.
- Production locations: Hollywood, California at Desilu Studios, doubling for New York City
- Cinematography: Paul Ivano; Robert B. Hauser; Black-and-White
- Running time: 30 minutes

Original release
- Network: ABC
- Release: October 10, 1958 – February 8, 1960

Man with a Camera is an American television crime drama starring Charles Bronson as a war veteran turned photographer and investigator. It was broadcast on ABC from October 10, 1958, to February 29, 1960.

== Plot ==
Bronson portrayed Mike Kovac, a former World War II combat photographer. He usually assists "newspapers, insurance companies, the police, private individuals, and anyone else who wanted a filmed record of an event".

Kovac frequently works as a private investigator, becoming involved in criminal investigations and cases that the police have been unable to resolve.

Besides an array of cameras for normal use, for surreptitious work Kovac employs cameras hidden in a radio, cigarette lighter and even his necktie. He also has a phone in his car, and a portable darkroom in the trunk where he can develop his negatives on the spot.

Kovac's police liaison, beginning in the second season, is Lieutenant Donovan (James Flavin), though he frequently seeks advice from and is aided by Anton Kovac (Ludwig Stössel), his father. They are of ambiguous Eastern European ancestry, in one episode Mike and his father serve kapusta to another character.

== Cast ==
- Charles Bronson as Mike Kovac
- James Flavin as Lieutenant Donovan
- Ludwig Stössel as Anton Kovac

== Guest stars ==
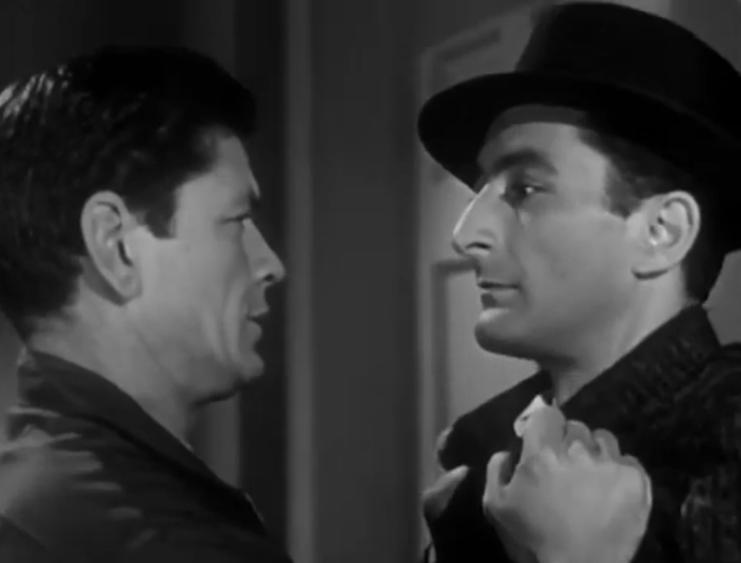
Charles Bronson (left) and Walter Maslow (right) in Man with a Camera, 1959

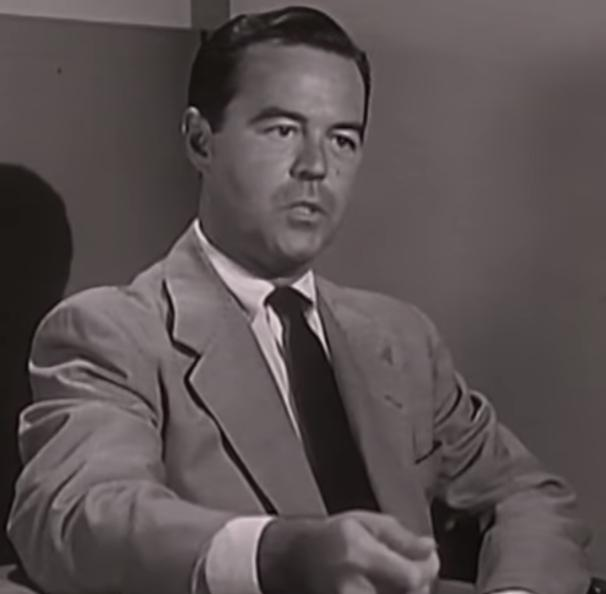
Casey Walters in Man with a Camera, 1959

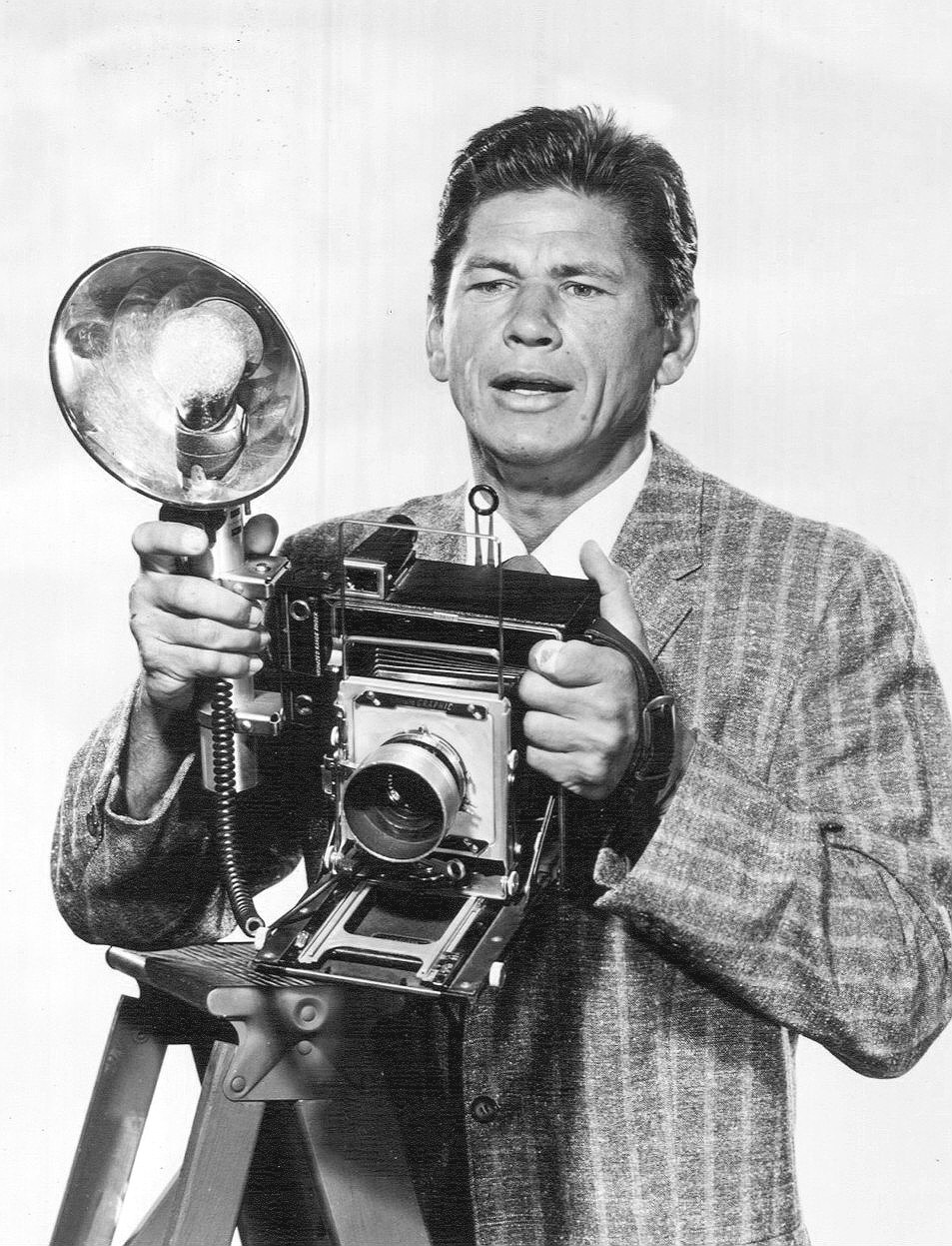
Bronson as Mike Kovac

- Mario Alcalde
- Rachel Ames
- Roscoe Ates
- Phyllis Avery
- Baynes Barron
- Arthur Batanides
- Nesdon Booth
- Steve Brodie
- Sebastian Cabot
- King Calder
- Anthony Caruso
- James Chandler
- John Cliff
- Marian Collier
- Booth Colman
- Russ Conway
- Yvonne Craig
- Norma Crane
- Audrey Dalton
- Alan Dexter
- Angie Dickinson
- Dolores Donlon
- Tex Driscoll
- Don Durant
- Robert Ellenstein
- Bill Erwin
- Frank Faylen
- Virginia Field
- John Goddard
- Don Gordon
- Rodolfo Hoyos Jr.
- Anthony Jochim
- I. Stanford Jolley
- William Kendis
- Don Kennedy
- Jess Kirkpatrick
- Berry Kroeger
- Fred Krone
- Ethan Laidlaw
- Tom Laughlin
- Nolan Leary
- Norman Leavitt
- Ruta Lee
- Karl Lukas
- Gavin MacLeod
- Howard McNear
- Eve McVeagh
- Theodore Marcuse
- Walter Maslow
- Gregory Morton
- Dennis Patrick
- John M. Pickard
- Phillip Pine
- Joe Ploski
- Mike Ragan
- Bert Remsen
- Lee Roberts
- Penny Santon
- Cosmo Sardo
- Simon Scott
- Johnny Seven
- Doris Singleton
- Harry Dean Stanton
- Ludwig Stössel
- Lawrence Tierney
- Peter Walker
- Casey Walters
- Dick Wessel
- Jesse White
- Grant Williams

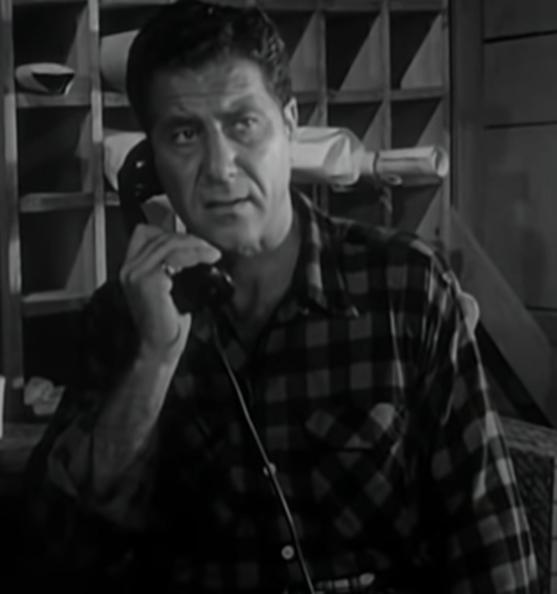
Baynes Barron in Man with a Camera, 1959

== Episodes ==
=== Season 1 (1958–59) ===
No. overall	No. in season	Title	Directed by	Written by	Original release date
1	1	"Second Avenue Assassin"	Gerald Mayer	William Fay	October 10, 1958
2	2	"The Warning"	Gerald Mayer	Richard M. Bluel	October 17, 1958
3	3	"Profile of a Killer"	Gerald Mayer	Story by : Richard M. Bluel; Teleplay by : James Edmiston	October 24, 1958
4	4	"Turntable"	Gerald Mayer	Lowell Barrington	November 7, 1958
5	5	"Closeup on Violence"	William Castle	Jack Laird & Wilton Schiller	November 14, 1958
6	6	"Double Negative"	Gerald Mayer	Story by : Ken Pettus; Teleplay by : James Edmiston	November 21, 1958
7	7	"Another Barrier"	Gerald Mayer	Stanley Niss	November 28, 1958
8	8	"Blind Spot"	Gerald Mayer	Donn Mullally	December 5, 1958
9	9	"Two Strings of Pearls"	Gerald Mayer	Robert J. Shaw	December 12, 1958
10	10	"Six Faces of Satan"	Boris Sagal	David P. Harmon	December 19, 1958
11	11	"Lady on the Loose"	Gerald Mayer	Oliver Crawford	December 26, 1958
12	12	"The Last Portrait"	Gerald Mayer	Wilton Schiller & Jack Laird	January 2, 1959
13	13	"The Face of Murder"	Gerald Mayer	Berne Giler	January 9, 1959
14	14	"Mute Evidence"	Paul Landres	Dallas Gaultois & James Edmiston	January 16, 1959
15	15	"The Big Squeeze"	Harold Schuster	David P. Harmon	January 23, 1959

=== Season 2 (1959–60) ===
No. overall	No. in season	Title	Directed by	Written by	Original release date
16	1	"The Killer"	Paul Landres	E. Jack Neuman	October 19, 1959
17	2	"Eyewitness"	Gene Fowler Jr.	Paul David	October 26, 1959
18	3	"The Man Below"	Gene Fowler Jr.	David P. Harmon	November 2, 1959
19	4	"Black Light"	Paul Landres	Wilton Schiller	November 9, 1959
20	5	"The Positive Negative"	Paul Landres	Oliver Crawford	November 16, 1959
21	6	"Missing"	Gene Fowler, Jr.	Story by : Hal Evarts; Teleplay by : Robert E. Thompson & Lee Loeb	November 23, 1959
22	7	"Live Target"	Paul Landres	Barry Trivers	December 7, 1959
23	8	"Girl in the Dark"	Gilbert Kay	Barry Trivers	December 14, 1959
24	9	"The Bride"	Paul Landres	Paul David	December 21, 1959
25	10	"The Picture War"	Paul Landres	David P. Harmon	January 4, 1960
26	11	"Touch Off"	Paul Landres	Oliver Crawford	January 11, 1960
27	12	"Hot Ice Cream"	Paul Landres	Story by : Howard Koppelman; Teleplay by : Howard Koppelman & Paul David	January 25, 1960
28	13	"Fragment of a Murder"	Wilton Schiller	Gilbert Kay	February 1, 1960
29	14	"Kangaroo Court"	Gilbert Kay	Wilton Schiller	February 8, 1960

== Production ==
Man with a Camera was filmed in Culver City, California, at Desilu Studios. From October 1958 to March 1959 it was broadcast on Fridays from 9 to 9:30 p.m. Eastern Time. From October 1959 to February 1960 it was broadcast on Mondays from 10:30 to 11 p.m. E.T. General Electric's Lamp Division sponsored the 1959-1960 episodes. Warren Lewis was the executive producer for Sharpe & Lewis Productions. A. E Houghton was the producer, and Gerald Mayer was a director.

== Home media ==
The entire run of the series' 29 episodes was released in 2007 by the Infinity Entertainment Group, in collaboration with the Falcon Picture Group and the UCLA Film & Television Archive, from which the source prints were obtained.

Alpha Video has released three individual volumes on DVD, each containing four episodes from the series. A fourth volume was released on February 25, 2014. On October 17, 2017, Mill Creek Entertainment released the complete series on DVD + Digital. Entire Series can be seen on Tubi streaming.
