= Kathy O' =

1958 film by Jack Sher

- Directed by: Jack Sher
- Screenplay by: Jack Sher; Sy Gomberg
- Story by: Jack Sher ("Memo on Kathy O'Rourke")
- Produced by: Sy Gomberg
- Starring: Dan Duryea; Jan Sterling; Patty McCormack; Mary Fickett
- Cinematography: Arthur E. Arling
- Edited by: George A. Gittens
- Music by: Frank Skinner
- Color process: Eastmancolor
- Production company: Universal International Pictures
- Distributed by: Universal Pictures
- Release date: September 24, 1958
- Running time: 99 minutes
- Country: United States
- Language: English

Kathy O' is a 1958 American CinemaScope comedy-drama film directed by Jack Sher and starring Dan Duryea, Jan Sterling, Patty McCormack and Mary Fickett.

== Plot ==
Kathy O'Rourke is a child actress who portrays girls such as Shirley Temple on the screen. However, in real life, Kathy is a self-centered brat. Publicity agent Harry Johnson is tasked by the studio with the job of keeping national magazine reporter Celeste Saunders, his ex-wife, from discovering that their child star is a devil and not an angel. Celeste and Kathy become great friends because Celeste treats Kathy as a normal child and not as a star. When Kathy runs away to be with Celeste, Harry is accused of kidnapping her.

== Cast ==
- Dan Duryea as Harry Johnson
- Jan Sterling as Celeste Saunders
- Patty McCormack as Kathy O'Rourke
- Mary Fickett as Helen Johnson
- Sam Levene as Ben Melnick
- Mary Jane Croft as Harriet Burton
- Rickey Kelman as Robert 'Bo' Johnson
- Terry Kelman as Tommy Johnson
- Ainslie Pryor as Lieut. Chavez
- Barney Phillips as Matt Williams
- Mel Leonard as Sid
- Casey Walters as Billy Blair
- Walter Woolf King as Donald C. Faber
- Alexander Campbell as Bixby
- Joseph Sargent as Mike
- Mary Carver as Marge

== See also ==
- List of American films of 1958
