= Invitation to Ohio =

1964 film

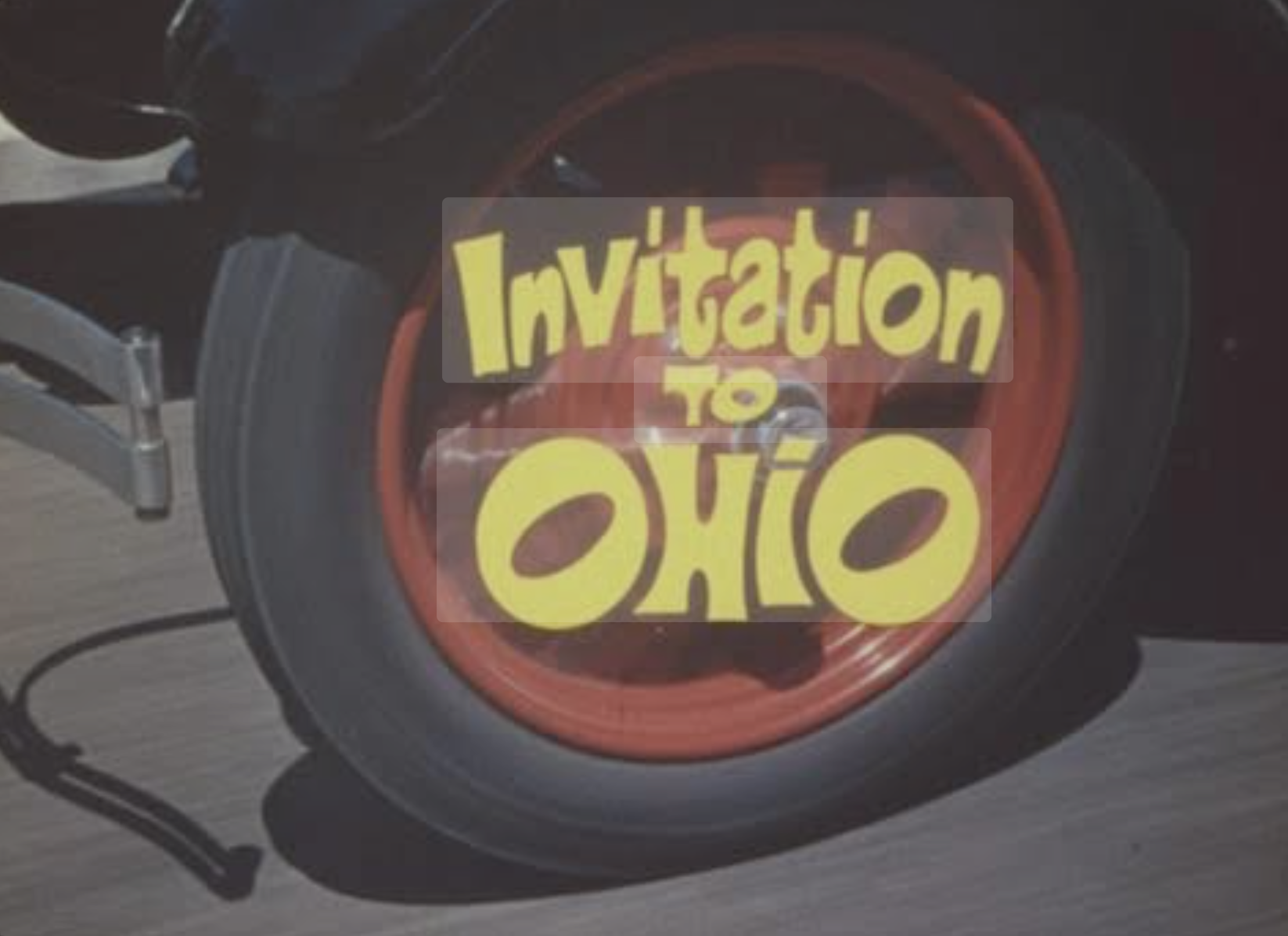
- Title frame
- Directed by: Julius Potocsny
- Written by: Frank Siedel
- Starring: Wally Cox; John Dehner; James A. Rhodes
- Cinematography: Harry Horrocks (uncredited)
- Edited by: Kay McCartney (uncredited)
- Music by: Zoltán Rozsnyai
- Production companies: Cinécraft -Continental Productions, Inc.
- Distributed by: Ohio Bell Telephone Company
- Release date: December 16, 1964
- Running time: 30 minutes
- Country: United States
- Language: English

Invitation to Ohio is a 1964 short industrial or sponsored film produced to attract new industries to Ohio and encourage existing industries to expand in the state. The film starred Hollywood actors Wally Cox and John Dehner.

One of the last big film projects for Ohio Bell, the movie was distributed free of charge to schools, civic groups, trade organizations, and business associations. "Invitation to Ohio" stands out for its high production quality and creative storytelling as part of the broader post–World War II genre of industrial films promoting places.

== Synopsis ==
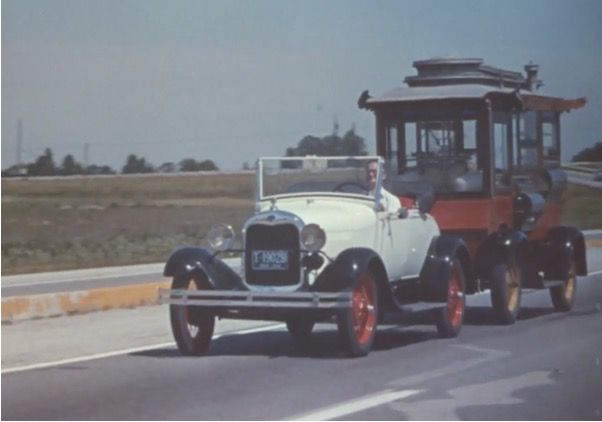
Frame from "Invitation to Ohio" (1964)

Wally Cox plays Doc Hutton, a small-time popcorn and peanut vendor looking to relocate his business. After seeing an ad for Ohio in The Wall Street Journal, Hutton contacts the state’s Director of Development, played by John Dehner, a prolific American character actor.

Mistaking Hutton for the president of a major corporation, the Director invites him to Ohio. Hutton accepts, prompting an extensive statewide tour during which the Director outlines the benefits of doing business in Ohio. Viewers are treated to a smorgasbord of Ohio's educational, recreational, and scientific facilities - from tugboats on the Ohio River to open-heart surgery at the Cleveland Clinic. In the end, of course, Doc Hutton decides to locate to Ohio along with his authentic 1880 vintage popcorn wagon.

"Invitation to Ohio" includes approximately 400 scenes emphasizing Ohio industries such as steel, rubber, automotive parts, glassware, and the emerging computing and communications sectors. The film also highlights the state’s research and development hubs, universities, cultural institutions, and recreational opportunities.

The movie opens with a statement on the purpose of the film by the Honorable Jim Rhodes, 61st and 63rd Governor of Ohio.

== Cast ==
- Wally Cox as "Doc" Hutton
- John Dehner as Director of Development
- Honorable Jim Rhodes, 61st and 63rd Governor of Ohio

== Production and background ==
Directed by Hungarian-born Julius Potocsny (1929–2002), “Invitation to Ohio” premiered on December 16, 1964, at Stouffer’s Top of the Town in Cleveland. At the time, Potocsny was Vice President and Executive Producer at Cinécraft Productions.

Composer and orchestra director Zoltán Rozsnyai wrote and directed the score, and musicians from the Cleveland Orchestra performed it. The entire Cleveland Orchestra, directed by George Szell, appears in the film.

In 2025, the National Film Preservation Foundation awarded the Hagley Museum and Library a grant to preserve the film. A copy of the restored film is on YouTube and on the Hagley website.
