= The Guns of Fort Petticoat =

1957 film

- Original film poster
- Directed by: George Marshall
- Screenplay by: Walter Doniger
- Based on: Petticoat Brigade; 1955 short story by C. William Harrison
- Produced by: Harry Joe Brown
- Starring: Audie Murphy
- Cinematography: Ray Rennahan
- Edited by: Al Clark
- Music by: Mischa Bakaleinikoff
- Color process: Technicolor
- Production company: Brown-Murphy Pictures
- Distributed by: Columbia Pictures
- Release date: April 1957
- Running time: 81 minutes
- Country: United States
- Language: English
- Box office: $1,080,000 (US rentals)

The Guns of Fort Petticoat is a 1957 American Western film produced by Harry Joe Brown and Audie Murphy for Brown-Murphy Pictures. It was based on the 1955 short story "Petticoat Brigade" by Chester William Harrison (1913–1994) that he expanded into a novelization for the film's release. It was directed by George Marshall, distributed by Columbia Pictures and filmed at the Iverson Movie Ranch and at Old Tucson.

The fictional story tells the tale of an Army deserter training a disparate group of women to become Indian fighters climaxing in a Battle of the Alamo-type action.

== Plot ==
In 1864, towards the end of the American Civil War, Texan Lt. Frank Hewitt was serving with the U.S. Cavalry under Colonel John Chivington. On patrol, Hewitt meets a group of unarmed Indians who are returning to the Sand Creek reservation that they were not supposed to leave. While being briefed by Hewitt, the colonel orders the attack known to history as the Sand Creek Massacre. Hewitt not only disagrees with the punishment of the Indians but realizes they will use the attack as an excuse to unite and spread terror throughout the Southwest, including his hometown in Texas, which has sent most of its men to fight for the Confederacy. Colonel Chivington sees Indian attacks on Texas, which will create havoc in the Confederacy, as a bonus. Violently objecting, Hewitt is placed under arrest and confined to quarters.

Hewitt deserts to warn the Texans but is hated and ignored as a traitor by his now-Confederate former neighbors, who despise him for serving with the Union. No one believes him until he brings home the dead body of a woman murdered by Comanches who have joined the uprising. Hewitt organizes a brigade of women and trains them in marksmanship and combat tactics. Armed and given military ranks, Hewitt and the women seize the day and hold on to the only safety they have in an abandoned mission (Fort Petticoat). The "blue-belly traitor" Hewitt and the petticoat brigade are deserted by the only remaining man; they fight off scavengers and Comanches as they struggle to build trust and work together during the ensuing attacks.

As the final gunfight ends, Hewitt and his greatest female critic fall in star-crossed love left over from childhood memories. But Hewitt cannot reciprocate because as an honorable soldier, he must return to his post at Sand Creek and face desertion charges. As Hewitt is being renounced as a deserter and a liar for his most fantastic story of helping to rescue the women in Texas and training them to fight off Comanches, Col. Chivington's commanding general happens to enter the trial room. As the guilty sentence and execution are about to be pronounced, Hewitt's female confederates return the favor, marching armed into the trial to stop the proceeding. The commanding general, in a surge of sentimental goodwill, orders a surrender to the armed ladies who have saved the day and proved Hewitt's truthfulness. Hewitt's testimony snares Col. Chivington (who is relieved of command and ordered held for trial) and Hewitt's hopes in his new-found Confederate love are restored.

== Cast ==
- Audie Murphy as 1st Lt. Frank Hewitt
- Kathryn Grant as Anne Martin
- Hope Emerson as Sgt. Hannah Lacey
- Jeff Donnell as Mary Wheller
- Jeanette Nolan as Cora Melavan
- Sean McClory as Emmett Kettle
- Ernestine Wade as Hetty
- Peggy Maley as Lucy Conover
- Isobel Elsom as Mrs. Charlotte Ogden
- Patricia Tiernan as Stella Leatham (as Patricia Livingston)
- Kim Charney as Bax Leatham
- Ray Teal as Salt Pork
- Nestor Paiva as Tortilla
- James Griffith as Kipper
- Madge Meredith as Hazel McCasslin
- Ainslie Pryor as Col. John Chivington
- Hugh Sanders as Sgt. Webber
- Al Wyatt Sr. as Sgt. Lebbard

== Production ==
The novel Guns of Fort Petticoat was published in March 1956.

In July 1955 Murphy announced he would make the film, which then had the working title Petticoat Brigade, after The World in My Corner and a biopic of Charles Marion Russell. He called the movie a "Destry-style Western." Murphy produced the movie through Brown-Murphy Pictures, which he had set up with producer Harry Joe Brown. On November 9, 1955, Murphy signed a contract with Walt Disney Productions and Brown-Murphy Pictures to appear in two films, of which this was the first. Disney wanted Murphy to make another movie; Murphy, who had the right to select stories, submitted proposals to appear in adaptations of Peer Gynt by Henrik Ibsen and The Idiot by Dostoevski. Brown accused Murphy of trying to get out of his contract and sued him for $1 million.

The working title of the film was Petticoat Brigade; screenwriter and television director Walter Doniger was originally set to direct the film.

Aline MacMahon was to appear in the cast but found the role too strenuous. She was replaced by Hope Emerson. Lucy Marlow was cast in a key role then dropped out and was replaced by Patricia Livingston.
