= The Adventures of Hiram Holliday =

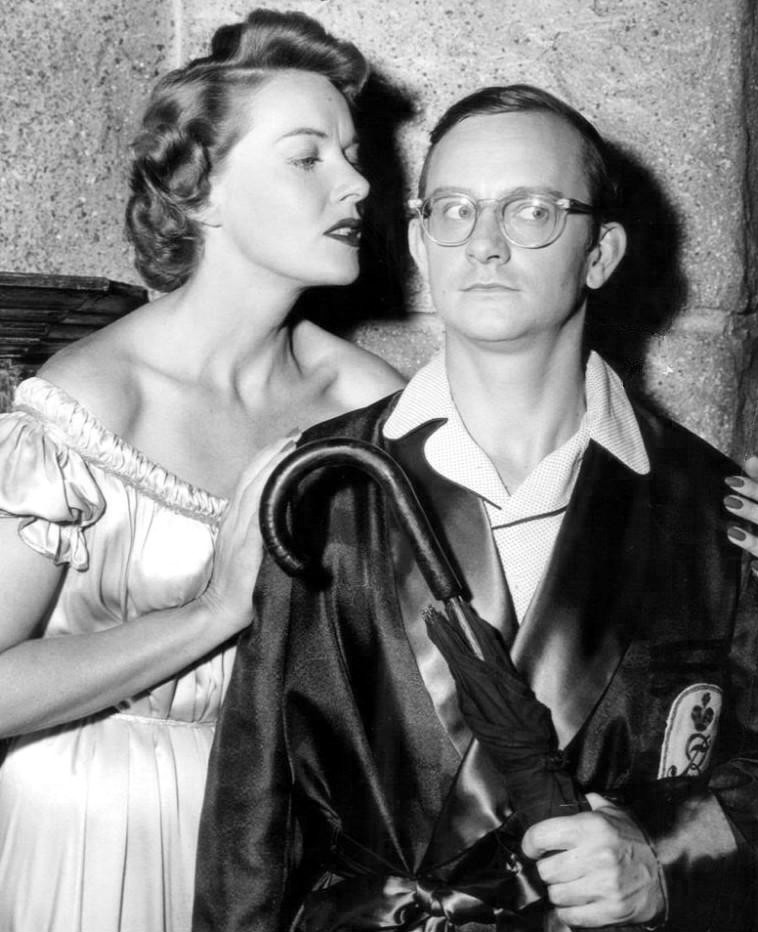
- Wally Cox as Hiram Holliday with Angela Greene, 1957
- Genre: Adventure sitcom
- Created by: Paul Gallico, based on his novel of the same name
- Starring: Wally Cox; Ainslie Pryor; Thurston Hall; Stanley Adams; Maureen Hingert; Lita Milan
- Country of origin: United States
- Original language: English
- No. of seasons: 1
- No. of episodes: 23 (3 unaired)

Production
- Producer: Philip Rapp
- Camera setup: Multi-camera
- Running time: 25 mins.
- Production company: California National Productions

Original release
- Network: NBC
- Release: October 3, 1956 – February 27, 1957

The Adventures of Hiram Holliday is an American adventure sitcom that aired on NBC from October 3, 1956 to February 27, 1957. Starring Wally Cox in the title role, the series is based on the 1939 novel of the same name by Paul Gallico.

== Plot ==
The series is similar to the book, and focuses on the adventures of a newspaper proofreader who through years of secret practice has gained James Bond-like skills in many forms of physical combat, shooting, and in activities as diverse as rock climbing and scuba diving. The proofreader, Hiram Holliday (Cox), was revealed to be muscular when stripped.

The starting gimmick of the series was that Holliday had inserted a comma in a news story which saved the publisher a small fortune in a trial. The grateful publisher rewarded Holliday with a trip around the world, which set the scene for him to solve crimes and thwart foreign spies in every port of call he visited.

== Personnel ==
Other cast members included actor Ainslie Pryor as Holliday's reporter sidekick, Joel Smith, and Sebastian Cabot as Monsieur Cerveaux, a criminal mastermind he repeatedly encountered. Thurston Hall portrayed Harrison Prentice, the newspaper's publisher.

Philip Rapp adapted, directed, and produced the series. Other directors included George Cahan and William Hole. Other writers included Bernard Drew, Doris Gilbert, Siegfried Herzig, John Kohn, Richard Powell, and Joel Malcolm Rapp.

== Production ==
California National Productions filmed 26 black-and-white episodes of The Adventures of Hiram Holliday with a laugh track, with 22 broadcast in its initial run. (Or twenty- It is possible that episodes Pasto Duro and The Vanishing House were postponed and not broadcast at this time.) Three additional scripts were commissioned (via WGA records- Pandora's Box, The Rustled Rocket and The Treasure Trove), and four previously-unbroadcast episodes aired during reruns in 1959 (The Surplus General, The Diamond Eater, The Amontillado, The Invisible Man, as well as Pasto Duro and The Vanishing House). "The Surplus General" is held by the Paley Center.

== Reception and cancellation ==
Sponsor General Foods (GF) renewed The Adventures of Hiram Holliday in June 1956, buying the Wednesday 8 to 8:30 p.m. time slot on NBC. Jell-O Desserts and Sanka Coffee featured as advertisements. The show's competition included Walt Disney on ABC and Arthur Godfrey and His Friends on CBS. GF sought to move the show to another time slot in December 1956, but NBC was unable to find another sponsor to take its place. NBC canceled the series in early 1957 after 20 episodes produced aired. There were American and Canadian reruns in 1959. The entire series later ran on the BBC from the fall of 1960 to the summer of 1961. In its BBC rerun, The Adventures of Hiram Holliday was the first US series to be shown five days a week in the same time slot.

Star Wally Cox was well known for portraying the title role in Mister Peepers, an early live NBC sitcom about a mild-mannered junior high school science teacher; it was typecasting he was never able to escape in later years. Hiram Holliday was Cox's last starring role.

== Episodes ==
Episodes of The Adventures of Hiram Holliday
Date	Episode	Synopsis
October 3, 1956	"Attache Case"	(Circulates in German)
October 10, 1956	"Lapidary Wheel"	(Circulates in English)
October 17, 1956	"False Monarch"	
October 24, 1956	"The Hollow Umbrella"	(At Paley Center in English)
October 31, 1956	"Sea Cucumber"	(Circulates in English)
Nov 7, 1956	"Gibraltar Road"	(Circulates in English)
November 14, 1956	"Monaco Hermit Crab"	
Nov 21, 1956	"Hawaiian Hamzah"	(Circulates in English)
November 28, 1956	"Swiss Titmouse"	
Dec 5, 1956	"The Wrong Rembrandt"	(Circulates in English)
December 12, 1956	"Dancing Mouse"	(Circulates in English)
Dec 19, 1956	"Christmas in Vienna/Christmas Fruchtbrod"	(Circulates in German)
Dec 26, 1956	"Adventure of the Romantic Pigeon"	(Circulates in English)
Jan 2, 1957	"Sturmzig Cuneiform"	(Circulates in German) (at UCLA in English)
Jan 9, 1957	"Moroccan Hawk Moth"	
January 16, 1957	"The Unkissed Bride"	
Jan 23, 1957 (scheduled)	"The Vanishing House"	(possibly unaired until 30-Oct-1959, more likely delayed)
Jan 30, 1957	"Shipwrecked Ancestor"	
Feb 6, 1957 (scheduled)	"Pasto Duro"	(possibly unaired until 23-0ct-1959, more likely delayed)
Feb 13, 1957	"Ersatz Joel"	
Feb 20, 1957	"Hiram's Holiday"	(At Paley Center in English)
Feb 27, 1957	"Misguided Missile"	(Held at UCLA) (Series finale, with four further episodes unaired at this time)
Mar 20, 1957	"Amontillado"	(Unaired during original run.)
Mar 27, 1957	"The Invisible Man"	(Unaired during original run.)
Dec 11, 1959	"The Surplus General"	(Possibly unaired until 1959 reruns.) (At Paley Center in English)
Dec 18, 1959	The Diamond Eater	(Possibly unaired until 1959 reruns.)

== Critical response ==
Reviewing the premiere episode of the show, Jack Gould wrote in The New York Times, "The series may work out as a Cox video vehicle, but avid Holliday enthusiasts might have some reservations." Gould said that the adaptation suited the spirit of the book and that Cox's appearance was suited to the literary character. He added that Cox and the show "are quite a few notches above the norm" but followed that statement with a warning: "... perhaps the only danger is that the basic premise may wear thin rather quickly upon repetition." Gould also found fault with Pryor's stepping out of character midway through the episode to introduce a commercial

== Earlier adaptation of novel ==
In 1951, The Philco Television Playhouse presented an hour-long adaptation of The Adventures of Hiram Holliday, with E. G. Marshall as Holliday. Jerry Franken, in a review in the trade publication Billboard, called the presentation an "incredible mangling" of Gallico's story, adding that it sometimes "verged on the ludicrous". Franken added that the actors "were too handicapped by the sloppy production to breathe any life into the proceedings."

== Novel ==
The original novel was Gallico's first published book. It was published by Grosset and Dunlap on the cusp of World War II in 1939. In form, the novel is a connected series of adventures, rather akin to short stories which flow into one another.

In the book, Holliday was rewarded with time off and a cash reward which he used to go to Europe. In Europe he fights spies and Nazis, finds his true love (and has affairs with several other women), achieves some fame as a foreign correspondent with his newspaper back in New York, and becomes the man of action he aspired to be. The book has the major themes of the protagonist coming to grips with his own character and destiny, how individuals act when confronted by great evil, and the overarching question of would war come to Europe. The book encapsulates Gallico's views and insights at the time of writing, without the hindsight of later events - some of which turned out to be wrong and others were quite accurate.

George Ward notes that "It is very evident that the Hiram Holliday saga was written in the direct aftermath of the Munich Agreement. It is clear where Gallico stood about Neville Chamberlain's policies of Appeasement. Holliday (and implicitly, Gallico) believes that the British have become soft and decadent, that they have lost the will to fight. The drunken debauched lord which Holliday sees in a night club is contrasted with the high ideals of Chivalry and the poetry of Chaucer(...) Where the British have been found wanting, a single plucky and quixotic American attempts to step into the breach".

The part set in Austria, in the direct aftermath of the Anschluss, depicts sullen Austrians who feel that their country had been invaded and occupied by unsavory foreigners. In this, Gallico - himself of partial Austrian origin - foreshadowed the doctrine of "Austria — the Nazis' first victim" which would become the political cornerstone of the post-war Second Austrian Republic. However, Gallico seems to have expected a post-war Habsburg restoration which failed to materialize.
