= Jack Sher =

American journalist

John Jacob Sher (16 March 1913 – 23 August 1988) was an American newspaper columnist, songwriter, film director, film writer, and producer.

== Career ==
Born in Minneapolis, Sher wrote for several magazines, including the Saturday Evening Post, Esquire, Redbook, Radio Mirror, Reader's Digest, and Collier's. He also had been a columnist for the New York Reporter, and from 1937 to 1940 Screen & Radio Weekly, a nationally syndicated Sunday supplement published by the Detroit Free Press.

Sher wrote a number of films for Audie Murphy, including in 1959, The Wild and the Innocent, which he also directed. In the 1979 remake for TV, The Kid from Left Field, Gary Coleman (1968–2010), who starred in the series, accepted the NAACP Image Award for Best Children's Special of Episode in a Series. Sher's 1971–1972 television play, Goodbye, Raggedy Ann was nominated for an Emmy for Outstanding Writing Achievement in Drama – Original Teleplay.

== Selected Credits ==
=== Broadway ===
- The Perfect Set-Up? – playwright

Songs:

"Make This a Slow Goodbye," Jack Sher (words), Farlan Myers (music)

=== Film ===
- My Favorite Spy (1951) – writer
- Shane (1953) – writer
- Off Limits (1953) – writer
- The Kid from Left Field (1953) – writer
- World in My Corner (1956) – writer
- Walk the Proud Land (1956) – writer
- Four Girls in Town (1957) – writer, director
- Joe Butterfly (1957) – writer
- Kathy O' (1958) – writer, director
- The Wild and the Innocent (1959) – writer, director
- The 3 Worlds of Gulliver (1960) – writer, director
- Love in a Goldfish Bowl (1961) – writer, director
- Paris Blues (1961) – writer
- Critic's Choice (1963) – writer
- Move Over, Darling (1963) – writer
- Slither (1973) – producer

=== Television ===
- Bewitched – 3 episodes

"It Takes One to Know One (26 November 1964; season 1, episode 11) – writer
"No More Mr. Nice Guy" (23 March 1967; season 3, episode 28) – writer
"Art for Sam's Sake" (23 February 1967; season 3, episode 24) – writer

- The Wackiest Ship in the Army – 1 episode

"The Stowaway" (31 October 1965; season 1, episode 7) – writer

- Goodbye, Raggedy Ann (1971) – producer, writer
- Holmes and Yo-Yo (1976–77) (TV series) – creator
- The Kid from Left Field (1979) – writer

=== Books ===
- Twelve Sport Immortals, Ernest Victor Heyn (1904–1995) (ed.), Bartholomew House (1951); OCLC 44087908, 2573468, 664373471

Sher contributed 8 essays

- Twelve More Sport Immortals, Ernest Victor Heyn (1904–1995) (ed.), Bartholomew House (1951); OCLC 1515524

Sher contributed 6 or more essays
