= Cole Younger, Gunfighter =

1958 film

- Theatrical release poster
- Directed by: R. G. Springsteen
- Screenplay by: Daniel Mainwaring
- Based on: The Desperado; 1950 novel by Clifton Adams
- Produced by: Ben Schwalb
- Starring: Frank Lovejoy; James Best; Abby Dalton; Jan Merlin; Douglas Spencer; Ainslie Pryor
- Cinematography: Harry Neumann
- Edited by: William Austin
- Music by: Marlin Skiles
- Color process: Color by DeLuxe
- Production company: Allied Artists Pictures
- Distributed by: Allied Artists Pictures
- Release date: March 30, 1958
- Running time: 78 minutes
- Country: United States
- Language: English

Cole Younger, Gunfighter is a 1958 American CinemaScope Western film directed by R. G. Springsteen and written by Daniel Mainwaring. It is based on the 1950 novel The Desperado by Clifton Adams. The film stars Frank Lovejoy, James Best, Abby Dalton, Jan Merlin, Douglas Spencer and Ainslie Pryor. The film was released on March 30, 1958, by Allied Artists Pictures.

== Plot ==
An outlaw helps a cowboy fight corruption.

== Cast ==
- Frank Lovejoy as Cole Younger
- James Best as Kit Caswell
- Abby Dalton as Lucy Antrim
- Jan Merlin as Frank Wittrock
- Douglas Spencer as Marshal Fred Woodruff
- Ainslie Pryor as Captain Follyard
- Frank Ferguson as Sheriff Ralph Wittrock
- Myron Healey as Phil Bennett / Charlie Bennett
- George Keymas as Sgt. Price
- Dan Sheridan as Phelps
