= Ainslie Pryor =

American actor

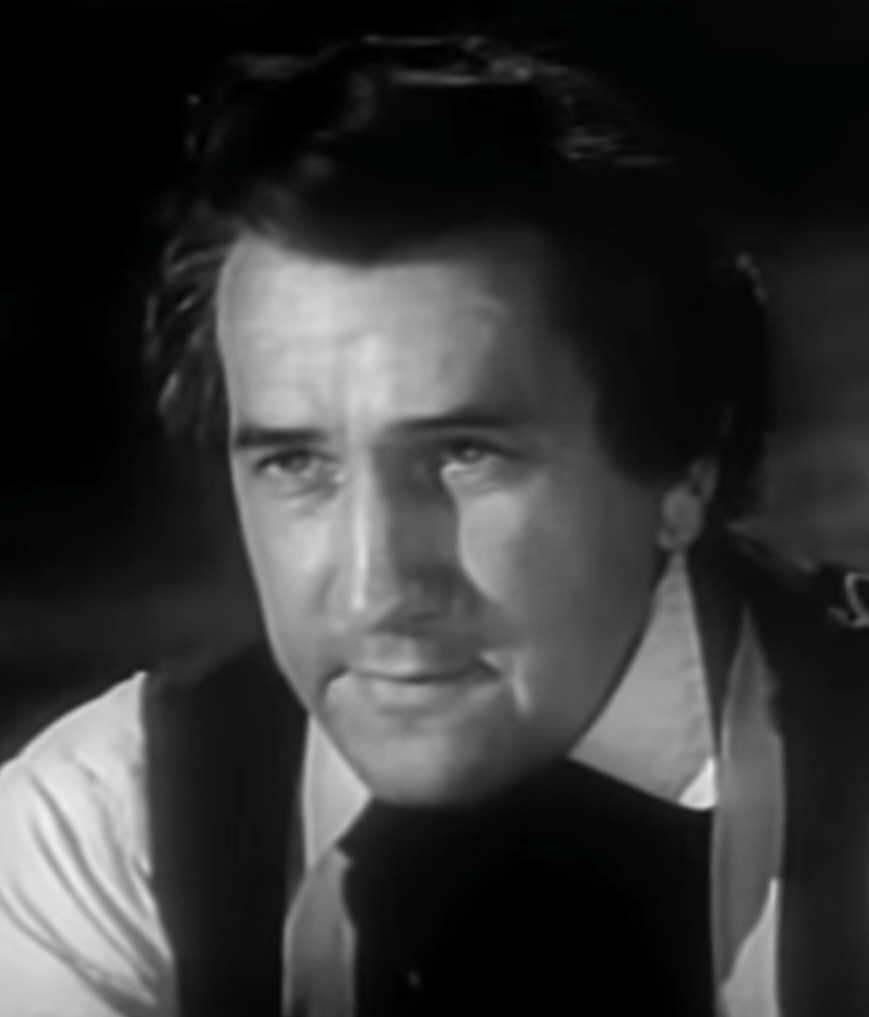
- Pryor in an episode of Medic (1955)
- Born: James Ainslie Pryor; February 1, 1921; Memphis, Tennessee, U.S.
- Died: May 27, 1958 (aged 37); Hollywood, California, U.S.
- Occupation: Actor
- Spouse: Susanne Wellman
- Children: 3

James Ainslie Pryor (February 21, 1921 – May 27, 1958) was an American actor.

== Early years ==
Pryor was born in Memphis, Tennessee, the son of William E. Prior. He graduated from Christian Brothers College and attended Southwestern and VPI. During World War II, he served with the Merchant Marine.

== Career ==
=== Radio ===
Pryor's early entertainment activities came in radio when he worked as an announcer at stations in New Haven, Connecticut, and New York City. He also was program director at WJPR radio in Greenville, Mississippi.

=== Stage ===
Before Pryor acted in films, he performed on stage. He organized a school and community theater while he worked in Greenville. He also managed and directed a little theater group in Raleigh, North Carolina. For three years he acted in The Lost Colony in Manteo, North Carolina, where he befriended Andy Griffith. His performances there, observed by actor Charles Laughton and producer Paul Gregory, led to his Broadway debut as the prosecuting attorney in The Caine Mutiny Court-Martial.

=== Film and television ===
He appeared in the films The Girl in the Red Velvet Swing, Ransom!, Walk the Proud Land, Four Girls in Town, The Shadow on the Window, The Guns of Fort Petticoat, The Left Handed Gun, Kathy O' and Onionhead.

On television, Pryor had a regular role as the sidekick of Wally Cox's lead character in the adventure sitcom The Adventures of Hiram Holliday. He portrayed Dr. William Beaumont in the "Who Search for Truth" episode of Medic (1956). He also appeared in the series' Ford Star Jubilee, Steve Donovan, Western Marshal, Lux Video Theatre, Front Row Center, You Are There, Medic, Wire Service, Sheriff of Cochise, Meet McGraw, Sugarfoot, Gunsmoke (In 1957 as “Cole Yankton”, an outlaw who had been Kitty’s first love in S3E4’s Kitty’s Outlaw”), Suspicion, Cheyenne, Studio One, General Electric Theater, Playhouse 90.

== Personal life and death ==
Pryor was married to Susanne Wellman, and they had three children. Both of them were artists whose work was displayed in North Carolina's State Art Gallery for several years.

He died of cancer on May 27, 1958, in Hollywood, California at age 37.

== Filmography ==
| Year | Title | Role | Notes |
|---|---|---|---|
| 1955 | The Girl in the Red Velvet Swing | Sport Donnelly | Uncredited |
| 1956 | Ransom! | Al Stannard | |
| 1956 | The Last Hunt | First Buffalo Hunter | |
| 1956 | Walk the Proud Land | Capt. Larsen | |
| 1957 | Four Girls in Town | James Manning | |
| 1957 | The Shadow on the Window | Dr. Hodges | |
| 1957 | The Guns of Fort Petticoat | Col. Chivington | Uncredited |
| 1958 | Cole Younger, Gunfighter | Captain Follyard | |
| 1958 | The Left Handed Gun | Joe Grant | |
| 1958 | Kathy O' | Lt. Chavez | Posthumously released |
| 1958 | Onionhead | Chief Miller | Final film role, posthumously released |
