= Four Girls in Town =

1957 film

- Film poster by Reynold Brown
- Directed by: Jack Sher
- Screenplay by: Jack Sher
- Produced by: Aaron Rosenberg
- Starring: George Nader; Julie Adams; Elsa Martinelli; John Gavin; Gia Scala
- Cinematography: Irving Glassberg
- Edited by: Fredrick Y. Smith
- Music by: Alex North
- Production company: Universal Pictures
- Distributed by: Universal Pictures
- Release date: January 16, 1957 (New York City)
- Running time: 85 minutes
- Country: United States
- Language: English
- Box office: $1 million (US)

Four Girls in Town is a 1957 American CinemaScope Technicolor drama film, directed by Jack Sher, about four girls trying to be movie stars.

== Plot ==
When the leading lady drops out of a new film to be shot in New Orleans, studio head James Manning seeks an unknown actress to be his new star. He finds four leading candidates and employs aspiring director Mike Snowden to conduct their screen tests.

The young women come from all walks of life. Kathy Conway is a Minnesota girl who agrees to try acting to please her mother. Ina Schiller is from Vienna, where she was recently widowed. Vicki Dauray comes from Paris, where she leaves behind a husband and child. Maria Antonelli is a beauty from Italy whose talent is mainly in alluring men.

Kathy takes a personal interest in Mike, but is disappointed when he leaves a party with Ina instead. Handsome actor Tom Grant is interested in Vicki and publicist Ted Larabee promotes her, neither aware that she is a married woman. Ina is introduced to Mike's moody composer friend Johnny Pryor, while Maria is seduced by Spencer Farrington Jr., a playboy hotelier.

Kathy's mother turns up and expects everyone to recognize her daughter as a future star. Kathy fails her screen test, but realizes Mike wants to pursue a personal relationship with her. The original actress changes her mind and takes back the film role, but the studio offers Ina and Maria movie contracts, and marriage contracts with their new suitors. Vicki is not disappointed, realizing that her family comes first.

== Cast ==
- George Nader as Mike Snowden
- Julie Adams as Kathy Conway
- Marianne Cook (Marianne Koch) as Ina Schiller
- Elsa Martinelli as Maria Antonelli
- Gia Scala as Vicki Dauray
- Sydney Chaplin as Johnny Pryor
- Grant Williams as Spencer Farrington Jr.
- John Gavin as Tom Grant
- Herbert Anderson as Ted Larabee
- Hy Averback as Bob Trapp
- Ainslie Pryor as James Manning
- Judson Pratt as William Purdy

== See also ==
- List of American films of 1957
