= Goodbye, Raggedy Ann =

- Written by: Jack Sher
- Directed by: Fielder Cook
- Starring: Mia Farrow; Hal Holbrook; John Colicos; Marlene Warfield; Martin Sheen
- Music by: Wladimir Selinsky
- Country of origin: United States
- Original language: English

Production
- Executive producer: Fielder Cook
- Producer: Jack Sher
- Cinematography: Earl Rath
- Editors: Philip W. Anderson; Gene Fowler, Jr.
- Running time: 75 minutes
- Production company: Metromedia Productions

Original release
- Network: CBS
- Release: October 22, 1971

Goodbye, Raggedy Ann is a 1971 American made-for-television drama film starring Mia Farrow, Hal Holbrook, John Colicos, Marlene Warfield, and Martin Sheen.

== Plot ==
Brooke Collier (Farrow) is an unstable Hollywood starlet who still clings to her ragdoll like a child, despite the rising amount of very adult problems in her life - her career has stalled, she is having an affair with a married man (Flanders), and she suffers violent, irrational mood swings. In an attempt to rebound from her life's failings, she accepts a marriage proposal from a millionaire (Colicos). Throughout all of her internal, and occasionally external, conflicts, her only friend is a frustrated writer and neighbor, Harlan Webb (Holbrook). As Brooke's situation and temperament become increasingly dire, Harlan may be the only one who can save her from herself.

== Cast ==
- Mia Farrow as Brooke Collier
- Hal Holbrook as Harlan Webb
- John Colicos as Paul Jamison
- Marlene Warfield as Louise Walters
- Ed Flanders as David Bevin
- Martin Sheen as Jules Worthman
- Walter Koenig as Jerry
