= Wally Cox =

American actor (1924–1973)

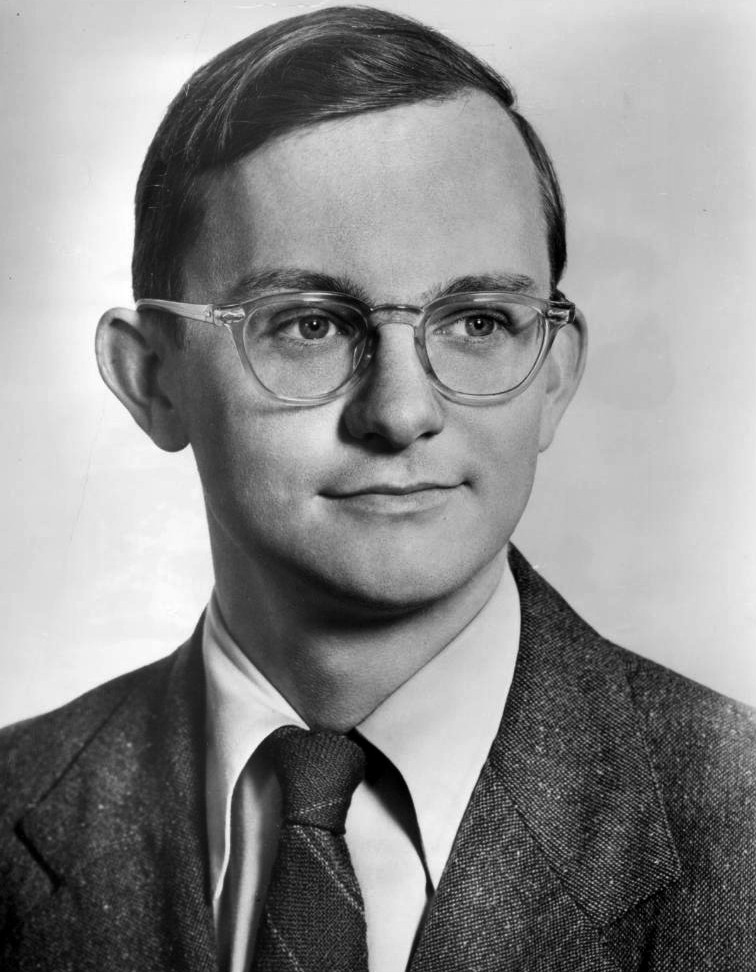
- Cox in 1962
- Born: Wallace Maynard Cox; December 6, 1924; Detroit, Michigan, U.S.
- Died: February 15, 1973 (aged 48); Los Angeles, California, U.S.
- Occupations: Actor; Comedian
- Years active: 1948–1973
- Spouses: Marilyn Gennaro (m. 1954; div. 1961); Milagros Tirado (m. 1963; div. 1966); Patricia Tiernan (m. 1969)
- Children: 2

Wallace Maynard Cox (December 6, 1924 – February 15, 1973) was an American actor. He began his career as a stand-up comedian and played the title character of the early American television series Mister Peepers from 1952 to 1955. He also appeared as a character actor in over 20 films and dozens of television episodes. Cox was the voice of the animated canine superhero Underdog in the Underdog TV series.

== Early life, education, and career beginnings ==
Cox was born on December 6, 1924, in Detroit, Michigan. At age 10, he moved with his divorced mother, mystery author Eleanor Blake, and his younger sister to Evanston, Illinois, where he became close friends with a neighbor, Marlon Brando. His family relocated several times, including a period in New York City, before returning to Detroit, where Cox graduated from Denby High School.

During World War II, Cox and his family returned to New York City, where he attended the City College of New York. He spent four months in the United States Army. According to a fellow soldier, Cox displayed unusual behaviors during basic training at Camp Wolters, Texas, such as donning his uniform and full pack to pick flowers on Sundays in an apparent effort to secure a discharge. After leaving the Army, he enrolled at New York University and supported his ailing mother and sister by making and selling jewelry in a small shop, while also performing comedy monologues at parties. These performances eventually led to regular nightclub appearances, including at the Village Vanguard, beginning in December 1948.

He became Brando's roommate, and his friend encouraged him to study acting with Stella Adler.

== Career ==
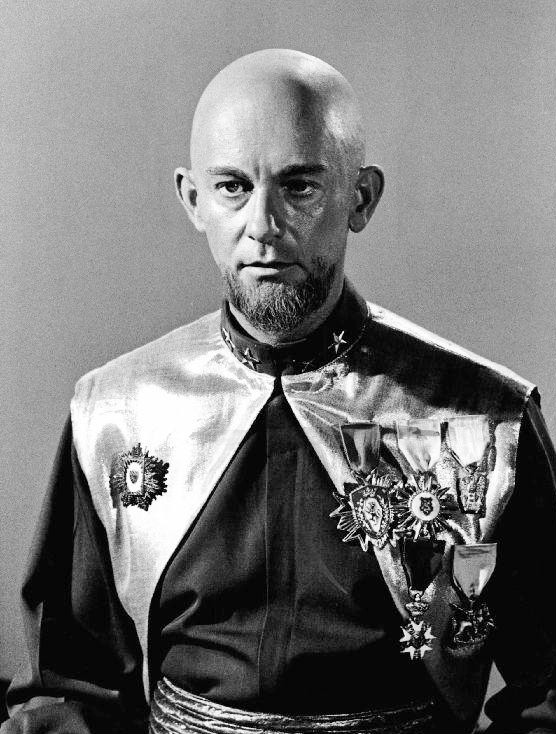
Cox on an episode of Lost in Space (1967)

In 1949, Cox appeared on the CBS network radio show Arthur Godfrey's Talent Scouts, to the great amusement of host Godfrey. The first half of his act was a monologue in a slangy, almost-mumbled punk-kid characterization, telling listeners about his friend Dufo: "What a crazy guy." The gullible oaf Dufo would take any dares and fall for his gang's pranks time after time, and Cox would recount the awful consequences: "Sixteen stitches. What a crazy guy." Just as the studio audience had reached a peak of laughter, Cox suddenly switched gears, changed characters, and sang a high-pitched version of "The Drunkard Song" ("There is a Tavern in the Town"), punctuated by eccentric yodels. "Wallace Cox" earned a big hand that night, but lost by a narrow margin to The Chordettes; yet he made enough of a hit to record his radio routine for an RCA Victor single. The "Dufo" routine ("What a Crazy Guy") was paired with "Tavern in the Town."

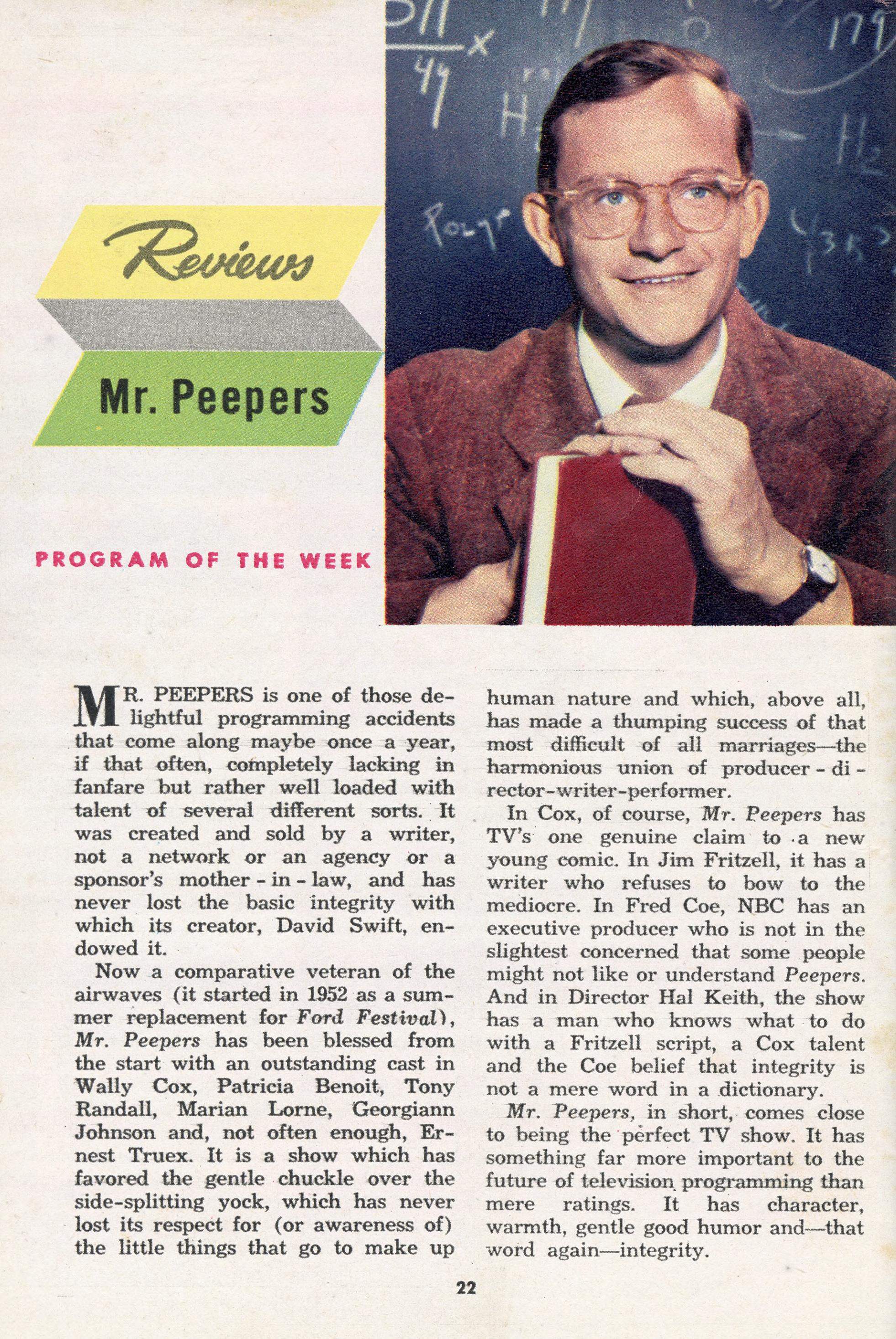
Cox in TV Guide, May 28, 1954

He appeared in Broadway musical reviews, night clubs, and early television comedy-variety programs between 1949 and 1951, including the short-lived (January–April 1949) DuMont series The School House and CBS Television's Faye Emerson's Wonderful Town. He appeared on the Goodyear Television Playhouse in 1951, starring in the comedy episode "The Copper" as the titular policeman. Series producer Fred Coe approached Cox about a starring role in a proposed live television sitcom Mister Peepers, which he accepted. The show ran on NBC television for three years. During this time, he also guest-starred on NBC's The Martha Raye Show.

Billboard magazine chronicled Cox's spectacular rise in booking fees: in the late 1940s, it was $75 per week at New York's Village Vanguard, $125 per week at the Blue Angel; $250 per week in Broadway's "Dance Me a Song" revue in 1950, and the Persian Room for $500 per week. The eight-year pact that he signed with NBC in late 1952 paid him $100,000 for 1953.

In 1953, Cox's comedy sketches were featured in The Ford 50th Anniversary Show, a program that was broadcast live on both NBC and CBS. Cox's four sketches consisted of a man trying to improve his physique, an expert on relaxation methods, a man practicing techniques that allow him to change from a wallflower to a social hit, and a man learning to dance. The program attracted an audience of 60 million viewers. Forty years after the broadcast, television critic Tom Shales recalled it as both "a landmark in television" and "a milestone in the cultural life of the '50s".

In 1959, Cox was featured in the guest-starring title role in "The Vincent Eaglewood Story" on NBC's Western series Wagon Train. He played a prominent supporting role as Preacher Goodman in Spencer's Mountain (1963), a Navy sonar operator in The Bedford Incident (1964), and a drug-addicted doctor opposite Marlon Brando in the World War II suspense film Morituri (1965).

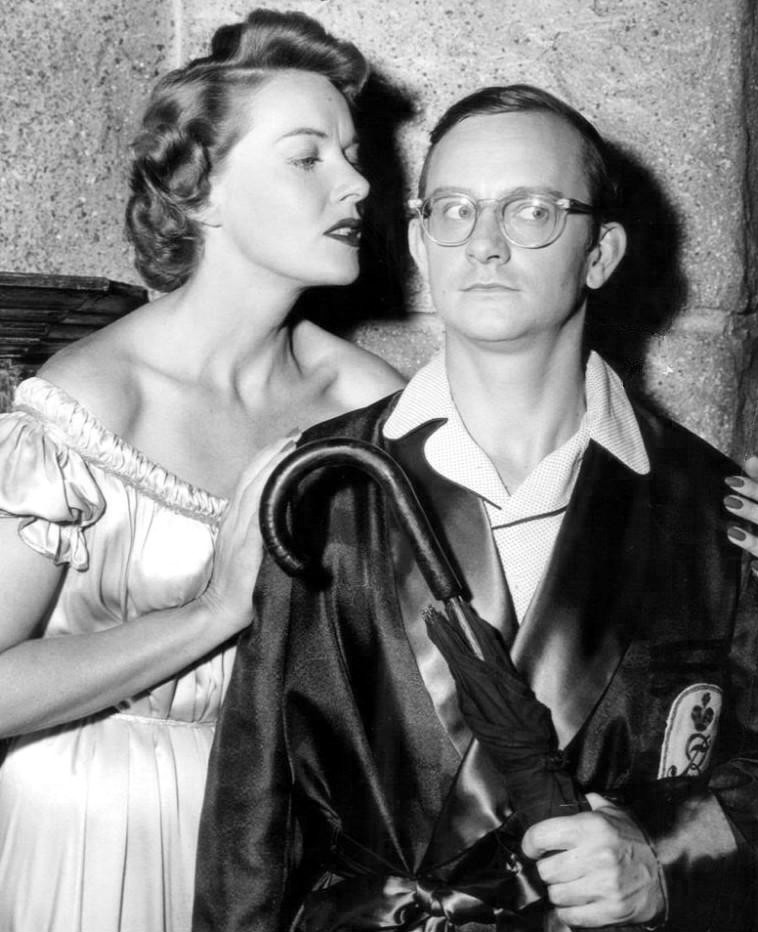
Cox as Hiram Holliday with Angela Greene (1957)

Other roles included the hero of the series The Adventures of Hiram Holliday, based on a series of short stories by Paul Gallico and co-starring Ainslie Pryor. He was a regular occupant of the upper left square on the television game show Hollywood Squares and voiced the animated cartoon character Underdog. He also was a guest on the game show What's My Line? and on the pilot episodes of Mission: Impossible and It Takes a Thief. Cox made several appearances on Here's Lucy, as well as The Beverly Hillbillies, Lost in Space, I Spy and evening talk shows. He played a pickpocket in an episode of Car 54, Where Are You?. Cox also appeared on The Twilight Zone, season five, episode number 140, titled "From Agnes—With Love".

He played character roles in more than 20 motion pictures and worked frequently as a guest star in television drama, comedy, and variety series in the 1960s and early 1970s. These included a supporting role in 20th Century Fox's unfinished film Something's Got to Give (1962), which starred Marilyn Monroe, Dean Martin and Cyd Charisse. He was cast as a down-on-his-luck prospector seeking a better life for his family in an episode of Alias Smith and Jones, a Western comedy, and in Up Your Teddy Bear (aka Mother) (1970), he starred with Julie Newmar. Cox's television and screen persona was that of a shy, timid but kind man who wore thick eyeglasses and spoke in a pedantic, high-pitched voice.

Cox wrote a number of books, including Mister Peepers: A Sort of Novel, co-written with William Redfield, which was created by adapting several scripts from the television series; My Life as a Small Boy, an idealized depiction of his childhood; a parody and update of Horatio Alger in Ralph Makes Good, which was probably originally a screen treatment for an unmade film intended to star Cox, and a children's book, The Tenth Life of Osiris Oakes.

== Personal life ==
In a 1950s article on Cox's series Mister Peepers, Popular Science reported that Cox kept a small workshop in his dressing room. (Cox's Hollywood Squares colleague Peter Marshall recalled in his memoir Backstage with the Original Hollywood Square that Cox installed and maintained all the wiring in his own home.)

While he maintained a meek onscreen persona, TV viewers did get a glimpse of Cox's physicality on an episode of I've Got a Secret, aired on May 11, 1960, in which he and host Garry Moore ran around the stage assembling furniture while the panel was blindfolded. On the May 15, 1974, installment of The Tonight Show, actor Robert Blake spoke of how much he missed his good friend Cox, who was described as being adventurous and athletic.

Cox married three times—to Marilyn Gennaro, Milagros Tirado, and Patricia Tiernan. He was survived by his third wife and his two children.

Throughout his life, Cox remained close friends with Marlon Brando. Brando appeared unannounced at Cox's wake, and was reported to have kept Cox's ashes in his bedroom, conversing with them nightly. Their close friendship was the subject of rumors, and Brando once told a journalist: "If Wally had been a woman, I would have married him and we would have lived happily ever after." Journalist Stephen Saban claims that writer-editor Beauregard Houston-Montgomery said that while under the influence of marijuana, Brando told him that Cox had been the love of his life.

== Death ==
Cox was found dead on February 15, 1973, in his home in the Bel Air section of Los Angeles; he was 48. According to the autopsy, Cox died of a heart attack caused by a coronary occlusion. Initial reports indicated that he wished to have no funeral and that his ashes be scattered at sea. A subsequent report indicated that his ashes were put in with those of Brando and another close friend, Sam Gilman, and scattered in Death Valley and Tahiti.

== Partial filmography ==
- The Sniper (1952) as Man Pressing Clothes at Dry Cleaners (uncredited)
- The Ford 50th Anniversary Show (1953)
- Wagon Train, "The Vincent Englewood Story" (1959)
- State Fair (1962) as Hipplewaite
- Car 54 Where Are You? - "No More Pickpockets" (1962) as Benny
- Something's Got to Give (unfinished Marilyn Monroe film, 1962) as Shoe Salesman
- Spencer's Mountain (1963) as Preacher Clyde Goodman
- The Twilight Zone – "From Agnes—With Love" (1964) as James Elwood
- Fate is the Hunter (1964) as Ralph Bundy
- Underdog (1964 – 1967) - Underdog (voice)
- The Yellow Rolls-Royce (1964) as Ferguson
- Invitation to Ohio (1964) co-stars as Doc Hutton
- Morituri (1965) as Dr. Ambach
- The Bedford Incident (1965) as Seaman Merlin Queffle
- Mission: Impossible (1966) as Terry Targo in the series pilot
- The Dick Van Dyke Show (1966) as Lincoln Goodheart (in S5:E17, "The Making of a Councilman")
- The Beverly Hillbillies (1966) as Professor P. Caspar Biddle
- Lost in Space – "Forbidden World" (1966) as Tiabo
- The Monkees (1967) – Man With "?" Box (uncredited) in S1:E29, "Monkees Get Out More Dirt"
- A Guide for the Married Man (1967) as Technical Adviser (Married 14 years)
- Vacation Playhouse (1967) as Alfred (in S5:E5 "Alfred of the Amazon")
- The One and Only, Genuine, Original Family Band (1968) as Mr. Wampler
- Quarantined (1970) as Wilbur Mott
- The Young Country (1970) as Aaron Grimes/Ira Greebe
- The Wacky Zoo of Morgan City (1970) as Becker
- The Cockeyed Cowboys of Calico County (1970) as Mr. Bester
- The Boatniks (1970) as Jason
- Up Your Teddy Bear (1970) as Clyde King
- The Barefoot Executive (1971) as Mertons
- The Night Strangler (1973) as Mr. Berry
