= Walk the Proud Land =

1956 film by Jesse Hibbs

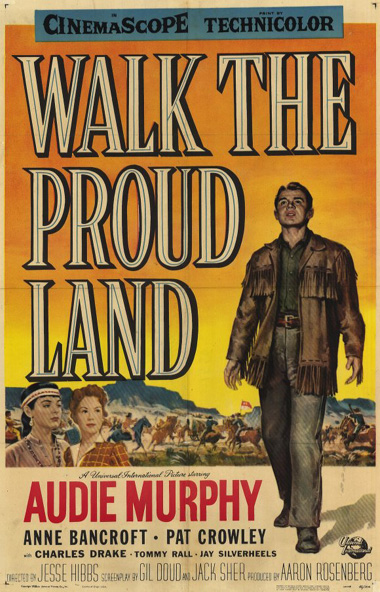
- Film poster by Reynold Brown
- Directed by: Jesse Hibbs
- Written by: Gil Doud; Jack Sher
- Based on: Apache Agent: The Story of John P. Clum; 1936 book by Woodworth Clum
- Produced by: Aaron Rosenberg
- Starring: Audie Murphy; Anne Bancroft; Pat Crowley
- Narrated by: Grant Williams
- Cinematography: Harold Lipstein
- Edited by: Sherman Todd
- Music by: Joseph Gershenson
- Production company: Universal-International Pictures
- Distributed by: Universal-International
- Release date: August 1, 1956
- Running time: 88 minutes
- Country: United States
- Language: English
- Box office: $1.5 million (US/Canada rentals)

Walk the Proud Land is a 1956 American CinemaScope Technicolor Western film directed by Jesse Hibbs and starring Audie Murphy and future Academy Award winner Anne Bancroft. Filmed at Old Tucson Studios, it recounts the first successful introduction of limited self-government by John Clum (1851–1932), Indian agent for the San Carlos Apache Indian Reservation in the Arizona Territory and is based on the 1936 biography Apache Agent by his son Woodworth Clum (1878–1946).

== Plot ==
The film begins in 1874, when John Clum arrives in Tucson, Arizona as the new Indian agent of the San Carlos Apache Indian Reservation. He meets with Arizona Territory Governor Safford and Army General Wade, both of whom mock the Department of the Interior's decision to change its policy toward the Apache, Wade calling them "savages". Arriving at San Carlos, Clum gives his papers to Wade's subordinate Captain Larsen and meets Larsen's subordinate Sergeant Sweeney. Clum orders Larsen to free Apache Chief Eskiminzin and his sub-chiefs, who are chained to posts. Clum gives Eskiminzin authority to dispense justice among his people as he sees fit, and orders Larsen and his troops, who have even less regard for the Apache than Safford and Wade do, to leave.

An Indian widow given to him as a housekeeper, Tianay, falls in love with Clum; he tells her that he is engaged, and his culture does not permit a man to have two "wives" at the same time. Two white men Clum encountered in Tucson showing off the scalps of Apache men and women they had taken are captured by Eskiminzin's son Taglito for poaching on the reservation. Clum demands the Sheriff charge the two men with attempted murder for wounding Taglito. Angered that no merchant will sell him beef or provisions, Clum goes to Safford and demands that Wade return the guns confiscated from the Apache. Safford overrules Wade's objections and tells Clum he will have the guns that afternoon. Back at San Carlos, newly armed Disalin attacks Clum, trying to encourage the other warriors to "be men again". Disalin is shot and killed by Taglito. As Sweeney berates Clum for re-arming the men, Tianay, dressing Clum's wound, tells them Disalin was Taglito's brother. Eskiminzin asks Clum to partake in a blood oath, as Taglito killed Disalin out of love for Clum. Clum says he would be honored and participates in the rite.

Clum and Taglito later go into Tucson and find a drunken Sweeney clutching a pillar outside a saloon. In the saloon, Clum and Sweeney, who tells Clum he has been discharged and plans to return to his native Iowa, are confronted by the two white men Clum wanted arrested; the Sheriff let them go. Taglito drives Clum and Sweeney, who have been beaten up by the two white men, back to San Carlos. Clum persuades Sweeney to stay on and organize a police force composed of Eskiminzin's men.

Almost immediately after his fiancée Mary arrives in Tucson, she and Clum are married by the Justice of the Peace. Mary had envisioned a fancy wedding, but Clum's insistence of treating the Apache as fellow human beings has rubbed nearly everyone in town the wrong way; he tells her they are lucky they are able to get married at all. Conflict arises between Mary and Tianay as soon as Clum moves Mary in.

Geronimo comes to the reservation to recruit warriors. Eskiminzin flatly rejects his efforts yet tells his men they may join Geronimo if they wish; none do. Clum tells Geronimo that he and his people are welcome to live at San Carlos if they agree to certain rules, including being unarmed while on the premises. Geronimo agrees to discuss it with his people. Tianay marvels at Clum's bravery, telling Mary he is the first white man to have spoken to Geronimo and lived.

Tianay's son Tono idolizes Geronimo and persuades his friend Pica to leave with him. It is after sundown when Sweeney discovers the boys are gone. Tianay realizes Tono is looking for Geronimo's camp, and insists she join Clum to search for them. They find the boys the next morning safe, asleep after having been scared by a coyote. On the way back, they encounter Geronimo and his men attacking a group of settlers; they are chased away by the Army. Clum, Tianay, and the boys return in a wagon with wounded settlers. The attack prompts warrior Santos (who has been courting Tianay) and several other men to join Geronimo. Clum asks Santos to take him to Geronimo, an idea Sweeney finds insane. A fed-up Mary packs her bags to leave but is "talked" out of it by Tianay, who admits she wants her to go but also knows that it is Mary whom Clum loves.

On the trail, Clum, Sweeney, and their party stop to rest. Clum discovers Tono hiding in his wagon. He decides Tono, who still idolizes Geronimo, "needs to learn a lesson" and allows him to stay. Clum then devises a plan: by using the echoes generated by the mountains whenever gunshots are fired, he hopes to convince Geronimo that he has more men than he actually does; he orders the men to hide in the mountains. Clum arrives at the camp with Tono beside him. After a heated exchange, Clum springs the plan. He returns with Geronimo and his men in shackles to find Wade has commandeered San Carlos. Clum quits, but is talked out of it by Eskiminzin, who says the people need him, and by Mary, who tells her husband that she has done some growing up in his absence. He tells Eskiminzin they are going to talk some sense into Wade after he washes up, then walks toward the house with Mary. The film ends with Tono holding a rifle above his head: "I am Mister [Clum]! I capture all my enemies!".

The epilogue states Clum never stopped fighting for the welfare of "his Indians", and the government turned administration of San Carlos over to the Apache in 1955.

== Cast ==
- Audie Murphy as John Philip Clum
- Anne Bancroft as Tianay
- Pat Crowley as Mary Dennison
- Charles Drake as Tom Sweeny
- Tommy Rall as Taglito
- Robert Warwick as Chief Eskiminzin
- Jay Silverheels as Geronimo
- Eugene Mazzola as Tono
- Marty Carrizosa as Pica
- Anthony Caruso as Disalin
- Victor Millan as Santos
- Ainslie Pryor as Larsen
- Eugene Iglesias as Chato
- Morris Ankrum as Gen. Wade
- Addison Richards as Gov. Safford
- John Pickard as the Sheriff
- Maurice Jara as Alchise

== Production ==
The role of Mary Dennison, Clum's fiancée, was originally offered to Piper Laurie, but she turned it down so she could study at the Actors Studio in New York. Pat Crowley was cast instead.

The right to use the title "Walk the Proud Land" was obtained from Logan Forster, author of "Proud Land," a novel of the same genre.

== Release ==
The film had its world premiere on August 1, 1956 at Walter Reade's Community Theatre in Hudson, New York.

== Reception ==
William Brogdon of Variety called the film "generally unexciting". The film was not a success at the box office, something attributed to the fact that Murphy played a pacifist rather than an action hero. This ended Murphy's plans to make his dream project, a biopic of painter Charles Marion Russell.

== See also ==
- List of American films of 1956
