= Mary Fickett =

American actress (1928–2011)

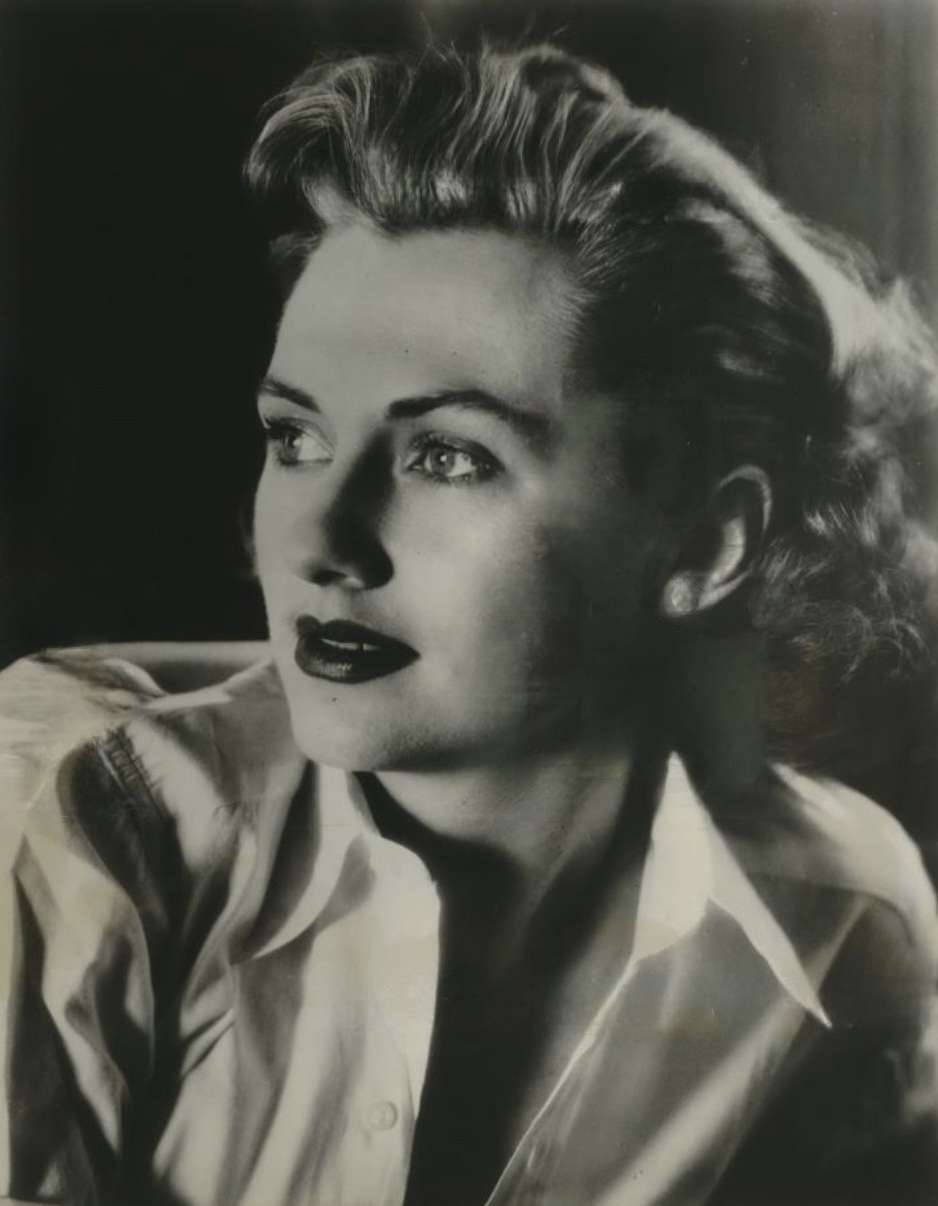
- Fickett in 1955
- Born: May 23, 1928; Buffalo, New York, U.S.
- Died: September 8, 2011 (aged 83); Callao, Virginia, U.S.
- Education: Wheaton College
- Alma mater: Neighborhood Playhouse
- Occupation: Actress
- Years active: 1946–2000
- Notable work: The Edge of Night, All My Children
- Spouse: Allen Fristoe (m. 1979–2008) (his death)
- Children: 2

Mary Fickett (May 23, 1928 – September 8, 2011) was an American actress with roles in the American television dramas The Nurses and The Edge of Night as Sally Smith (1961) and Dr. Katherine Lovell (1967–68). She was best known as Ruth Perkins Brent Martin on All My Children, a role she played from 1970–1996 (briefly reprising the role from 1999–2000).

== Early life ==
Fickett was born in Buffalo, New York and raised in Bronxville, a suburb of New York City. She was the daughter of Homer Fickett and Mary Bruce Stewart Fickett, who at one time were city editor and reporter, respectively, on the Buffalo Courier-Express newspaper. He later directed radio programs. She graduated from Riverdale Country School and attended Wheaton College in Massachusetts.

== Stage, film and television ==
Fickett made her theatrical debut in 1946 on Cape Cod in a July 4 production of Pygmalion with Gertrude Lawrence. In 1949, she made her Broadway debut appearing in I Know My Love, a comedy starring Alfred Lunt and Lynn Fontanne. Fickett studied acting at New York City's Neighborhood Playhouse under Sanford Meisner and dancing under Martha Graham and started her television career working on "Television Theatre" programs like Kraft Television Theatre in the 1950s.

Joan Fontaine's illness led to a starring role for Fickett in Tea and Sympathy in 1955. She was signed on March 1, 1954, as understudy for Deborah Kerr, who then starred in the show, and she remained in that status when Fontaine replaced Kerr. She had 45 minutes' notice before curtain time when Fontaine became ill with a virus. "The audience groaned when the announcement was made," Fickett said later, "but they stood up and cheered at the final curtain and I cried." Fontaine returned to the role, but later bursitis caused her to withdraw from the production. At that point the producers gave the role to Fickett permanently. She went on to win a Theatre World Award award for her work in the show. Her first feature film was Man on Fire alongside Bing Crosby in 1957. She appeared in the film Kathy O' (1958). In 1958, she received a Tony Award nomination as Best Featured Actress in a Play for her performance as Eleanor Roosevelt in Sunrise at Campobello, opposite Ralph Bellamy.

Beginning on October 2, 1961, Fickett was hostess on Calendar on CBS-TV weekdays from 10 to 10:30 a.m. Eastern Time, a forerunner to CBS's The Early Show; she appeared alongside host Harry Reasoner, conducting interviews and appearing in commercials. A review of the premiere episode in The New York Times said, "Miss Fickett is a charming co-host, quick and bright with nary a trace of condescending theatricalism." She also appeared in an episode of Have Gun Will Travel, which starred Richard Boone. The episode was in season five, "The Vigil". In 1969 she appeared on Bonanza season 10, episode 18 as the title character in "Erin", as an Irish immigrant raised among Native Americans who becomes Hoss's fiancee.

== All My Children ==
In January 1970, the American Broadcasting Company launched its new soap opera All My Children, created by Agnes Nixon. Fickett was an original cast member playing Ruth Parker Brent, a nurse at the local hospital and wife of alcoholic car salesman Ted Brent. Her character quickly found an attraction to the widowed Joe Martin (Ray MacDonnell). The pair tried to ignore their attraction until Ruth's husband was killed in a car accident. Ruth married Joe onscreen, and she moved into the Martin house with Joe, mother-in-law Kate, and step-daughter Tara. Happiness for the new family was shortened by the Vietnam War. Agnes Nixon had always intended for her soap opera to deal with important issues of the day, so to facilitate Richard Hatch exiting the role of Phil Brent his character was drafted into service.

Ruth became an anti-war protester and made some of the first anti-Vietnam speeches aired on American daytime television. This storyline decision, although troubling to television executives at the time, earned Fickett a 1973 Emmy Award for Outstanding Achievement by Individuals in Daytime Drama, the first such award given to a daytime performer. In 1974 she was nominated for the first Daytime Emmy Award for Outstanding Lead Actress in a Drama Series. The storyline involved her son being missing in action. This was another milestone for daytime TV, as it was the first time a war scene was aired on daytime television. The audience saw Phil being hit by a bullet and going down, then carried away by a young Vietnamese boy (played by the adopted son of a friend of Nixon).

Joe and Ruth were happily married, but she later had a friendship with Dr. David Thornton which would jeopardize her marriage. Ruth and Joe thought that they could not conceive a child together. To have the child they always wanted they began proceedings to adopt Tad Gardner, a child who had been pushed out of a moving vehicle. Joe's son and daughter-in-law found Tad and decided to adopt him, but daughter-in-law Mary was killed, so Ruth and Joe adopted him. A problem arose when Tad's father, Ray Gardner, arrived in town wanting money and filed a lawsuit to stop the adoption proceedings. He then tried to extort money from the Martin family, in exchange for stopping the lawsuit. Joe refused to do this and kicked him out of his house, but Ruth called him back saying they could "sort things out." Fickett's second controversial storyline started when Ray showed up in a drunken rage and raped Ruth. Fickett received her second Daytime Emmy nomination for this storyline in 1978. Ruth and Joe later had their own son, Joe Martin, Jr. (called Joey), but there was a fear during the pregnancy that the child would have Down syndrome.

== Retirement ==
In the mid-1990s, Fickett decided that she wanted to reduce her schedule and spend more time with her family. She allowed her contract to expire and expected to go on recurring status, meaning she could still appear on the program but did not have to meet any contractual obligations or minimum number of appearances. Negotiations with the producers of the program broke down, and the role of Ruth Martin was recast with Lee Meriwether taking on the character in 1996. In 1998, Meriwether was let go and Fickett rehired on recurring status beginning on Christmas episode. She resumed the role of Ruth and supported several front burner storylines including son Tad's romance with Dixie and the breakdown of son Dr. Jake (Joey) Martin's marriage to Gillian. After another year, Fickett decided to call it quits from the busy schedule of soap opera acting and retired in December 2000. In 2002, the producers wanted to bring the character of Ruth back, but Fickett remained in retirement, so Meriwether was rehired and played Ruth whenever the occasion arose.

== Personal life and death ==
Fickett married actor James Congdon on October 26, 1958, in New York City. She later married Jay Leonard Scheer, with each marriage ending in divorce. Her third and final marriage was to Allen Fristoe (a daytime TV director) from June 1979 until his death in 2008. Fickett had two children from her three marriages.

In 2007, Fickett moved in with her daughter, Bronwyn Congdon, in Colonial Beach, Virginia, where she remained bedridden. Fickett died September 8, 2011, aged 83, at her Callao, Virginia home, from complications of Alzheimer's disease, according to her daughter. ABC dedicated the series finale episode of All My Children in Fickett's memory. That episode aired September 21, 2011.
