= Marlene Warfield =

American actress (1941–2025)

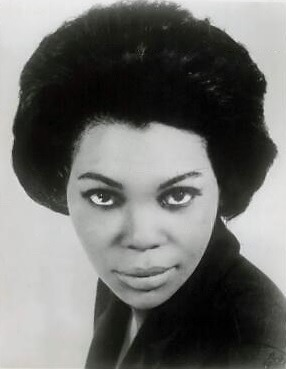
- Warfield in 1969
- Born: Marlene Ronetta Warfield; June 19, 1941; New York City, U.S.
- Died: April 6, 2025 (aged 83); Los Angeles, California, U.S.
- Occupation: Actress
- Years active: 1957–2011
- Spouse: William Horsey (m. 1967; died 1993)
- Children: 1

Marlene Ronetta Warfield (June 19, 1941 – April 6, 2025) was an American actress who worked in theatre, film, and television.

== Background ==
Warfield was born in Queens, New York, on June 19, 1941, and brought up in Brooklyn. She attended the High School of Performing Arts and began acting on stage as a teenager, in 1957. She later attended the Brooklyn Conservatory of Music and the American Institute of Theatre and TV Arts.

== Career ==
Warfield began her career in New York, working on stage and screen. She moved to Los Angeles in the late 1970s. She portrayed the underground revolutionary Laureen Hobbs in the 1976 film Network and played Victoria Butterfield on the television sitcom Maude (1977–1978). Warfield starred in the play Janie Jones at the New Theatre, London (opened July 15, 1968).

She won the Clarence Derwent Award in 1969 for Outstanding Broadway Debut Performance and a Theatre World Award for the role of Clara in The Great White Hope, which she reprised in the 1970 film version.

== Personal life and death ==
In 1967, Warfield married William Horsey (died 1993); they had a son. She died of lung cancer at a Los Angeles hospital on April 6, 2025, at the age of 83.

== Filmography ==
Film and television
Year	Title	Role	Notes
1970	Joe	Bellevue Nurse	Feature film
1970	The Great White Hope	Clara	Feature film
1970	The Name of the Game	Sdhari	Episode: "The Time Is Now"
1971	Goodbye, Raggedy Ann	Louise Walters	Television film
1972	Cutter	Susan Macklin	Television film
1972	Madigan	Clara	Episode: "The Midtown Beat"
1972	Across 110th Street	Mrs. Jackson	Feature film
1973	Pomroy's People	School Teacher	Television pilot
1976	Network	Laureen Hobbs	Feature film
1977–1978	Maude	Victoria Butterfield	Main cast (8 episodes)
1978	Lou Grant	Joanne Bartlett	Episode: "Hero"
1979	The Jeffersons	Mrs. Owens	Episode: "Me and Mr. G"
1981	The Sophisticated Gents	Lil Joplin	Television miniseries
1981	Little House on the Prairie	Mattie Ledoux	Episode: "Dark Sage"
1983	Hill Street Blues	Ada Baxter	Episode: "Moon Over Uranus: The Sequel"
1984	Cagney & Lacey	Detective #2	Episode: "Old Debts"
1986	Child's Cry	Maxine	Television film
1986	Jo Jo Dancer, Your Life Is Calling	Sonja	Feature film
1989	Perry Mason: The Case of the Lethal Lesson	Prosecutor	Television film
1989	How I Got Into College	Librarian	Feature film
1990	Freddy's Nightmares	Helen Woodman	Episode: "A Family Affair"
1990	Equal Justice	Judge Evelyn Kass	Episode: "Sugar Blues"
1996	In the House	Grandma Hill	Episode: "The Max Who Came to Dinner"
1997	ER	Babs Chenovert	Episode: "Tribes"
1999	The West Wing	Ruth	Episode: "Pilot"
2000	So Weird	Mrs. Clemens	Episode: "Blues"
2001	Dead Last	Woman	Episode: "The Crawford Touch"
2002	The Shield	Dottie Cummings	Episode: "Dawg Days"
2003	Cold Case	Samuela Robbins	Episode: "The Runner"
2011	Aurora Borealis	Mrs. Parker	Short film
