= Harbor Command =

American police TV series

- Genre: Action
- Starring: Wendell Corey; Casey Walters
- Country of origin: United States
- Original language: English
- No. of seasons: 1
- No. of episodes: 39

Production
- Camera setup: Single-camera
- Running time: 30 mins.
- Production company: Ziv Television Programs

Original release
- Network: Syndication
- Release: October 11, 1957 – July 4, 1958

Harbor Command is an American police series that was syndicated, with 39 half-hour episodes produced in 1957-1958. A Spanish-language version was broadcast in Panama, Peru, Puerto Rico, and Venezuela.

== Overview ==
The series stars Wendell Corey as Captain Ralph Baxter, head of the Harbor Command of a large coastal city. Baxter and the officers in his unit fought "dope smugglers, murderers, and other assorted villains".

Baxter differed from other police officers in that he had studied criminal psychology, enabling him "to figure out what the criminal mind would do under certain circumstances."

Although series had a water setting, much of Baxter's activity occurred on land as he used his police car to track down suspects.

== Production ==
The series was produced by Ziv Television Programs, with the assistance of the law enforcement arms of Harbor and Port Authorities across the country. Captain Richard Storm, of the Port of San Diego's Harbor Police, was credited as the technical adviser for the series. Vernon Clark and Herbert Strock were producers, and Strock directed. Vincent Forte wrote for the series.

Corey said that he and Ziv received most of the revenue from sales of the show, which affected the quality of episodes. "There isn't enough left to get good supporting actors or buy good scripts," he said. He added that executives in production often made bad scripts worse with their own changes.

Two episodes were filmed in San Diego, with the show otherwise being based in San Francisco.

Hamm's Beer sponsored the show in 55 markets in mountain states, the Midwest and the Southwest, closing the deal in January 1957 before the show debuted that fall.

Ziv selected Character Merchandising of New York to create items for Harbor Command-related items for children. The first product was a four-foot fireboat that shot water.

Production expenses led Ziv to end the series after its 39-episode initial run.

== Critical response ==
A review in The New York Times called Harbor Command "a sea-going version of the landlubbing crime stories that float around the television screens Friday nights this season." The review complimented the way ships and the waterfront contributed a "colorful backdrop" but added that without those elements "you have the same old whodunit stew."

The trade publication Variety's review of the premiere episode called Harbor Command "Dragnet in a nautical setting". It observed that Corey was "okay" in his role but that the episode's script should have been better. It concluded that the "generally run-of-the-mill production" had some high points, but the music reached "annoying proportions both in volume and number of repeats."

== Guest stars ==
- Fred Aldrich
- Rayford Barnes
- Ray Boyle
- Bill Cassady
- Don Eitner
- Jack Hogan
- Harry Holcombe
- Ray Kellogg
- Joan Marshall
- Peter Marshall
- Ken Mayer
- Joyce Meadows
- Ed Nelson
- Leonard Nimoy
- Edmond O'Brien
- Richard O'Brien
- Jack Reitzen
- Ronnie Schell
- William Swan
- Robert Tetrick
- Gary Vinson
- John Vivyan
- Patrick Waltz

== Episodes ==
| No. | Title | Directed by | Written by | Original release date |
|---|---|---|---|---|
| 1 | "Champhor Tubes aka Cop Killer" | Herbert L. Stock | Story by : Leo Handel; Teleplay by : Vincent Forte | October 11, 1957 |
| 2 | "Murder On Pier 7 aka Camera Murder" | James Sheldon | Arthur Weiss | October 18, 1957 |
| 3 | "Boat Bomb aka Time Bomb" | Leon Benson | Don Ingalls | October 25, 1957 |
| 4 | "The Bag aka Metallic Sodium" | Herbert L. Strock | Teleplay by : John Kneubuhl | November 1, 1957 |
| 5 | "Fisherman's League aka Protection Racket" | James Sheldon | Don Clark | November 8, 1957 |
| 6 | "Frightened Witness aka Silent Watchman" | Leon Benson | William Driskill | November 15, 1957 |
| 7 | "The Assassin aka Hired Killer" | Leon Benson | Lee Berg | November 22, 1957 |
| 8 | "Counterfeit Money aka Counterfeit" | Sutton Roley | A. Sanford Wolfe and Irwin Winehouse | November 29, 1957 |
| 9 | "Final Score aka Frame-Up" | Sutton Roley | Don Ingalls | December 6, 1957 |
| 10 | "Dead on 'B' Deck aka Smuggled Jewels" | Lew Landers | Arthur Weiss | December 13, 1957 |
| 11 | "Ransom At Sea aka Kidnapping" | Unknown | Unknown | December 20, 1957 |
| 12 | "Floating Transmitter aka Heroin" | Unknown | Unknown | December 27, 1957 |
| 13 | "Illegal Entry aka Crime vs. The Media" | Unknown | Unknown | January 3, 1958 |
| 14 | "Yacht Club aka Simple Burglary" | Unknown | Unknown | January 10, 1958 |
| 15 | "Trapped Pilings aka Revenge" | Unknown | Unknown | January 17, 1958 |
| 16 | "Harbor Mission aka Mission Hideout" | Unknown | Unknown | January 24, 1958 |
| 17 | "Gold Smugglers aka Suicide or Murder" | Unknown | Unknown | January 31, 1958 |
| 18 | "Contraband Diamonds aka $500,8B0000 in Diamonds" | Unknown | Unknown | February 7, 1958 |
| 19 | "The Big Hoax aka Top Man Junkie" | Unknown | Unknown | February 14, 1958 |
| 20 | "The Witness aka Child Witness" | Unknown | Unknown | February 21, 1958 |
| 21 | "Killer On My Doorstep aka Held Hostage" | Unknown | Unknown | February 28, 1958 |
| 22 | "Four To Die aka Black Pearls" | Unknown | Unknown | March 7, 1958 |
| 23 | "Hostage aka Newlywed Hostages" | Unknown | Unknown | March 14, 1958 |
| 24 | "Rendezvous At Sea aka Kidnap-Murder" | Unknown | Unknown | March 21, 1958 |
| 25 | "Right To Die aka Self-Paid Murder" | Unknown | Unknown | March 28, 1958 |
| 26 | "Date With Eternity aka Distress Call" | Unknown | Unknown | April 4, 1958 |
| 27 | "Sunken Gold aka Gold and Murder" | Unknown | Unknown | April 11, 1958 |
| 28 | "Decoy aka Smuggled Plates" | Unknown | Unknown | April 18, 1958 |
| 29 | "Arson aka Firebug" | Unknown | Unknown | April 25, 1958 |
| 30 | "Shore Patrol aka Rolling the Navy" | Unknown | Unknown | May 2, 1958 |
| 31 | "Smallpox" | Unknown | Unknown | May 9, 1958 |
| 32 | "Ghost Ship aka Boat Adrift" | Unknown | Unknown | May 16, 1958 |
| 33 | "Bum's Rush aka Murder Extortion" | Unknown | Unknown | May 23, 1958 |
| 34 | "Lover's Lane Bandits" | Unknown | Unknown | May 30, 1958 |
| 35 | "Lobster Smuggling" | Unknown | Unknown | June 6, 1958 |
| 36 | "Clay Pigeon aka Stalking Capt. Baxter" | Unknown | Unknown | June 13, 1958 |
| 37 | "The Phychiatrist aka Imaginary Insult" | Unknown | Unknown | June 20, 1958 |
| 38 | "Sanctuary aka Internation Intrigue" | Unknown | Unknown | June 27, 1958 |
| 39 | "Desperate Men aka Armed Robbery" | Unknown | Unknown | July 4, 1958 |

== Home release ==
On September 17, 2013, Timeless Media Group released Harbor Command- The Complete Series on DVD in Region 1.

== See also ==
- Seaway
