= Zoltán Rozsnyai =

Hungarian conductor and musical director

- Born: January 29, 1926; Budapest, Hungary
- Died: September 10, 1990 (aged 64); San Diego, California, U.S.
- Education: Franz Liszt Academy of Music
- Occupations: Conductor, musical director
- Known for: Founder of Philharmonia Hungarica; Music Director of San Diego Symphony; Assistant Conductor of New York Philharmonic
- Notable work: Search (1964), Invitation to Ohio (1964)

Zoltán Rozsnyai (January 29, 1926 – September 10, 1990) was a Hungarian conductor and musical director.

Born in Budapest, he was a graduate of the Franz Liszt Academy of Music, where he studied under Zoltán Kodály, Béla Bartók, and Ernest von Dohnányi, and conducting under János Ferencsik, among others. Already a concert pianist at the age of 10, he was one of the youngest students ever accepted by the Academy. At 24, he was appointed Music Director of the Debrecen Opera and subsequently the orchestras of Miskolc, Pécs and Györ in Hungary.

In 1954, he became permanent conductor of the Hungarian National Philharmonia Concert Organization. In May 1956, he was awarded the second prize at the International Conductor's Competition in Rome, which resulted an immediate invitation to return to Rome as a guest conductor. After the Hungarian Revolution of 1956, Rozsnyai left Budapest for Vienna, where he founded the famous Philharmonia Hungarica, composed of outstanding exiled musicians. With tireless effort, he built the Philharmonia Hungarica into one of the most outstanding concert orchestras in Europe.

Rozsnyai made his U.S. debut as a guest conductor with the Minneapolis Symphony in December 1956.

Under the auspices of the Rockefeller and Ford Foundations, Rozsnyai brought the Philharmonia Hungarica to America in 1959 for its first United States tour. They earned high critical acclaim everywhere. Individual guest invitations followed.

In 1961, Rozsnyai became a United States resident. In 1962, he became Assistant Conductor of the New York Philharmonic under Leonard Bernstein. In 1963, he was named Music Director of the Cleveland Philharmonic and the next year, Music Director of the Utica Symphony Orchestra.

Rozsnyai wrote and conducted scores for several films, including Search (1964) and Invitation to Ohio (1964) These two films were directed by another exiled Hungarian, Julius Potocsny, and produced by Cinécraft Productions, Inc. with the music played by members of the Cleveland Orchestra.

In 1967, Rozsnyai was selected from over 130 candidates for the position of Music Director of the San Diego Symphony. Under his direction, the Orchestra made its first professional recording on the Vox label. This recording was added to Zoltán Rozsnyai's many record credits, which include Columbia Masterworks as well as distinguished European labels. In 1982, he built up the Knoxville Symphony on the occasion of the World's Fair, and in 1987, he founded the International Orchestra of San Diego. This orchestra consisted of a select group of young musicians who had performed with symphonic orchestras and musical ensembles all over the world.

The orchestra, being close to Mexico, performed on both sides of the border to unusual acclaim. He joined his International Orchestra of San Diego with the Pro-Musica Ensenada Choir and the Convivium Musicum Choir of Mexico and produced Mozart's Requiem, Vivaldi's Gloria and made a recording of Haydn's Seasons. He worked with the International University Orchestra of San Diego until September 10, 1990, when he died from a heart attack.
