= Florentia Sale =

British writer (1790–1853)

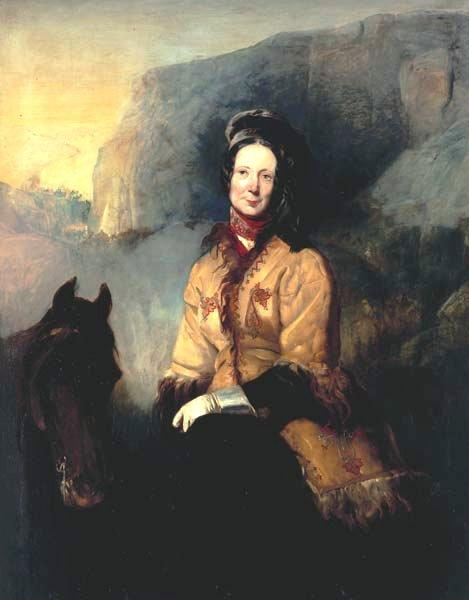
- Sale by Richard Thomas Bott, 1844
- Born: Florentia Wynch; 13 August 1790; Madras, Tamil Nadu, India
- Died: 6 July 1853 (aged 62); Cape Town, South Africa
- Notable work: A Journal of the Disasters in Afghanistan, 1841–2
- Spouse: Sir Robert Henry Sale (1809–1845)

Florentia Sale, Lady Sale (née Wynch; 13 August 1790 – 6 July 1853) was an Englishwoman who travelled the world while married to her husband, Sir Robert Henry Sale, a British army officer. She was dubbed "the Grenadier in Petticoats" for her travels with the army, which took her to regions such as Mauritius, Burma, Afghanistan, India, and various other areas under the control of the British Empire.

== Early life ==
Florentia Wynch was born on 13 August 1790, in Madras, during Company rule in India, the daughter of George Wynch, a member of the civil service. George's father Alexander Wynch was the Governor of Madras for a time during the 1770s. It is possible she is named after her paternal grandmother, Florentia Craddock, wife of Alexander. She was raised by her uncles and received a good education as a child.

== Marriage and adult life ==
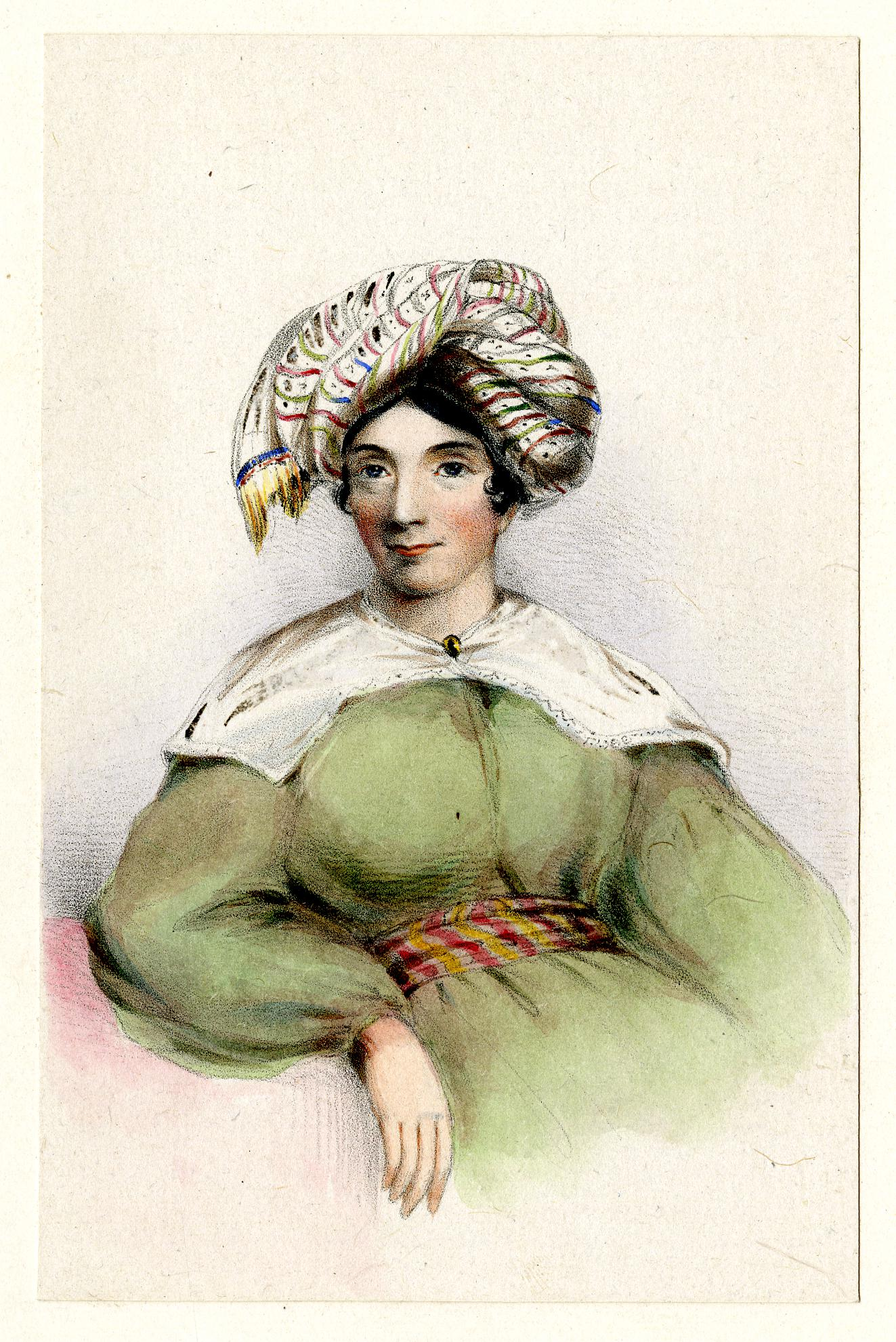
Portrait of Lady Sale from Prison Sketches. Comprising portraits of the Cabul prisoners, and other subjects by Vincent Eyre

In 1809, Wynch married Sir Robert Henry Sale of the British Army. She accompanied him on his numerous postings, raising their children while he fought. The Sales had three sons and seven daughters. During the First Anglo-Afghan War, Lady Sale, along with other women and children, as well as soldiers, were taken prisoner in 1842 during the British Army's retreat from Kabul and detained for nine months. The group were taken hostage by Akbar Khan following the massacre in the Khurd Karbul Pass. Amongst the hostages with Lady Sale was her youngest daughter Alexandrina, along with her husband Lieutenant John Sturt. Sturt was fatally injured by a severe wound to his abdomen, in an attack in which Lady Sale was shot in the wrist and Mrs Sturt's pony was shot in the neck and ear. The two women nursed him during his final hours. Upon his death, she secured him a Christian burial. After nine months, the party managed to negotiate the Afghan captors into releasing them; they were then rescued by Sir Richmond Shakespear on 17 September 1842. Throughout her time as a captive, Lady Sale kept a diary, detailing the events of the ordeal in a very straight forward and thoughtful manner. She sent parts of her diary through her captivity to her husband and he sent it on to the authorities in England and it was quoted by the papers at the time. She was unimpressed by how the newspapers had reported her actions. A year later, she published this as A Journal of the Disasters in Afghanistan, 1841–42, which documented her experiences throughout the Afghan War, and the book received critical acclaim. During her time in Afghanistan, Lady Sale collected some ancient coins and donated 20 of them to the British Museum. One of the coins is on display today.

Lady Sale's husband was killed in action in 1845 during the First Anglo-Sikh War, leaving her widowed. From 1846-1848 she had a grace and favour apartment at Hampton Court Palace, just outside London. She remained in India for most of the rest of her life. After her husband's death she received a pension of £500 per annum in light of her conduct as a prisoner and her husband's military services. Sale took a trip to the Cape of Good Hope in 1853 for her health, though she died not long after her arrival, on 6 July 1853, in Cape Town, South Africa. Lady Sale was originally buried in the Somerset Road Cemetery. After the leveling of this cemetery, the monument for Lady Sale and her remains were re-erected in the Maitland Cemetery, Cape Town, where her grave exists to this day. Her tombstone reads "underneath this stone reposes all that could die of Lady Sale".

== Works ==
- Sale, Florentia (1843). A Journal of the Disasters in Afghanistan, 1841–42. London: John Murray.
