= Chester William Harrison =

American novelist

Chester William Harrison (1913 in Indiana – 1994) was an American author who wrote under the names C. William Harrison, Coe Williams and Will Hickok. He wrote up to 1200 novels, non-fiction books and pulp and slick magazine stories.

== Biography ==
Harrison worked as a portrait photographer and a builder of house trailers where he had his first fictional story published in 1936. His first novel Boothill Trail was published in 1940.

His Collier's Weekly two part magazine story Petticoat Brigade was purchased by Audie Murphy and co-produced with Harry Joe Brown as the 1957 film The Guns of Fort Petticoat. Harrison did a novelization of the screenplay and the original stories under the same title in the same year.

Under the name Will Hickok he wrote three western novels: Web of Gunsmoke (1955), The Restless Gun (1959) and Trail of the Gun (1960), the latter two tie-ins with the American television show The Restless Gun.

His non-fiction works include Conservation, the Challenge of Reclaiming our Plundered Land, Find a Career in Auto Mechanics, Here Is Your Career: The Building Trades and Here is Your Career, Auto Mechanic.
