= Casey Walters =

American film, television and theatre actor

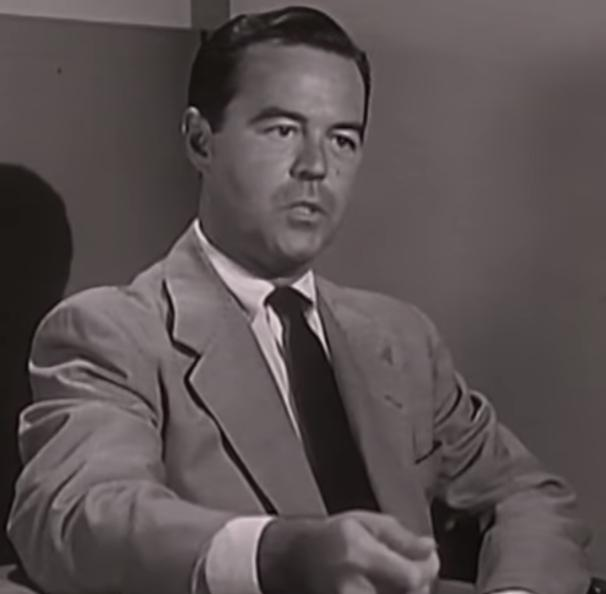
- Walters in Man with a Camera, 1959
- Born: June 25, 1916; Boston, Massachusetts, U.S.
- Died: December 3, 1991 (aged 75); Helena, Montana, U.S.
- Occupations: Film, television and theatre actor
- Years active: 1948–1967

Casey Walters (June 25, 1916 – December 3, 1991) was an American film, television and theatre actor. He was best known for playing Sgt. Jim Warren in the American police procedural television series Harbor Command.

Born in Boston, Massachusetts. Walters began his career in 1948, as appearing in the Broadway play Mister Roberts, where he played the role of “Dolan”.

Later in his career, Walters appeared in another Broadway play, titled, Red Roses for Me, playing the role of “Mulcany”. His final Broadway credit was from the play A Minor Adjustment, in which he played the role of “Cameron Clark”. In his film and television career, Walters co-starred in the police procedural television series Harbor Command playing the role of Sgt. Jim Warren, in which Walters starred with Wendell Corey who played the role of Captain Ralph Baxter.

Walters died on December 3, 1991 of a stroke in Helena, Montana, at the age of 75.
