= Paul Huson =

British writer and artist (born 1942)

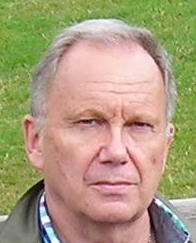
- Born: Paul Anthony Huson; 19 September 1942 (age 84); London, England
- Occupations: Writer, artist
- Partners: William Bast

Paul Huson (born 19 September 1942) is a British writer and artist currently living in the United States. In addition to writing several books about occultism and witchcraft, he has worked extensively in the film and television industries.

== Early life ==
Huson was born on 19 September 1942 in London, the son of the author Edward Richard Carl Huson and painter and motion picture costume designer Olga Lehmann. Huson attended North Bridge House School from 1949 through 1956 and Leighton Park School from 1956 through 1959, then entered the Slade School of Fine Art at the University of London as a Diploma student from 1959 through 1963, with a principal in painting under Andrew Forge and a subsidiary in theatrical design under Nicholas Georgiadis and Peter Snow. In 1963 he was awarded an Associated Rediffusion Scholarship to study film under Thorold Dickinson for a further post graduate year.

== Work in film and television ==
After a walk-on role in René Clément's film starring Gerard Phillipe, Monsieur Ripois, Huson acted in Laurence Olivier's film of Richard III playing the part of Edward, Prince of Wales, one of the two Princes in the Tower.

From 1965 through 1968 Huson worked as an art director for BBC television and Columbia Pictures, UK, before emigrating to the United States, where he began writing books and stories and scripts for American television, which included the television series Family and James at 15. Between 1982 and 1987 he and his partner William Bast wrote and produced three television series Tucker's Witch, The Hamptons, and The Colbys (a spin-off of the Aaron Spelling series Dynasty); The Colbys won the 1986 People's Choice Award. In 1989 he and Bast wrote a two-part series Twist of Fate, followed in 1991 by The Big One: the Great Los Angeles Earthquake, another two-parter, which was instrumental in alerting Los Angeles to their inadequate earthquake response arrangements at that time. In 1995 Huson and Bast wrote the teleplay for Danielle Steel's popular novel Secrets. In 1995 they wrote Deadly Invasion: The Killer Bee Nightmare; a paranormal thriller The Fury Within; and Power and Beauty, a controversial biographical teleplay about socialite Judith Exner and her relationship with President John F. Kennedy.

== Esoteric studies ==
While still a student at the Slade Huson studied the Qabalah and the Western Esoteric Tradition with Dion Fortune's Society of the Inner Light. In 1964 he worked as Karlis Osis' research assistant at the American Society for Psychical Research in New York. In 1965 he studied the history and practices of the Hermetic Order of the Golden Dawn and the Stella Matutina under the aegis of Israel Regardie.

Huson subsequently wrote a number of popular books on occult and allied subjects: the influential Mastering Witchcraft (1970) a study of tarot symbolism The Devil's Picturebook (1971); Mastering Herbalism (1974); an introduction to parapsychology How to Test and Develop your ESP (1975); two novels, The Keepsake (1981), and The Offering (1984), and a second work on tarot symbolism and the history of tarot reading, Mystical Origins of the Tarot (2004). He generally illustrates his non-fiction books himself, and designed a deck of tarot cards based upon his research, Dame Fortune's Wheel Tarot (2009).

== Memberships ==
He is a member of the Authors Guild of America, the Academy of Television Arts & Sciences, the Writers Guild of America, west, and the British Academy of Film and Television Arts.

== Personal life ==
Huson lives in Los Angeles. His frequent collaborator and partner for forty-nine years was William Bast.
