= The Masque of the Red Death (1964 film) =

1964 horror film by Roger Corman

- Theatrical release poster by Reynold Brown
- Directed by: Roger Corman
- Screenplay by: Charles Beaumont; R. Wright Campbell
- Based on: "The Masque of the Red Death" "Hop-Frog" by Edgar Allan Poe
- Produced by: Roger Corman
- Starring: Vincent Price; Hazel Court; Jane Asher; David Weston; Nigel Green; Patrick Magee
- Cinematography: Nicolas Roeg
- Edited by: Ann Chegwidden
- Music by: David Lee
- Production company: Alta Vista Productions; Anglo-Amalgamated
- Distributed by: American International Pictures (U.S.); Warner-Pathé (U.K.)
- Release date: June 24, 1964
- Running time: 90 minutes
- Countries: United States; United Kingdom
- Language: English
- Box office: 121,794 admissions (France)

The Masque of the Red Death is a 1964 gothic horror film directed and produced by Roger Corman, and starring Vincent Price, Hazel Court, Jane Asher, David Weston, Nigel Green, and Patrick Magee.

The screenplay, written by Charles Beaumont and R. Wright Campbell, was based upon the 1842 short story by Edgar Allan Poe, and incorporates a subplot based on another Poe tale, "Hop-Frog". Another subplot is drawn from Torture by Hope by Auguste Villiers de l'Isle-Adam. The story follows a prince who terrorizes a plague-ridden peasantry while merrymaking in a lonely castle with his jaded courtiers.

It is the seventh of a series of eight Corman film adaptations largely based on Edgar Allan Poe's works made by American International Pictures (AIP). It was an international co-production between AIP and British studio Anglo-Amalgamated, filmed at Elstree Studios. The film was released in both the U.S. and U.K. on June 24, 1964.

== Plot ==
On a mountain in medieval Italy, an old woman meets a red-cloaked figure shuffling Tarot cards. The figure gives her a white rose, which then turns red and dappled with blood.

Prince Prospero, a Satanist, visits the village he rules, and is confronted by two starving villagers, Gino and Ludovico. Meanwhile, the old woman dies, infected with a deadly plague known as the Red Death. Upon discovering her, Prospero orders the village burned and abducts Gino, Ludovico and Francesca, who is Ludovico's daughter and Gino's lover. He then tells the local nobility to come to his castle.

At the castle, Francesca is finely dressed by Prospero's consort, Juliana, and the gathered nobility are entertained by two dwarf dancers, Esmeralda and Hop-Toad. When Esmeralda accidentally knocks over a goblet of wine, one of Prospero's guests, Alfredo, strikes her. Meanwhile, Juliana tells Prospero she wishes to be initiated into his Satanic cult.

Imprisoned in the castle, Gino and Ludovico are taught armed combat so that they can kill one another as entertainment for the nobility, which they refuse to do. Juliana performs a ritual in the Black Room, pledging her soul to Satan, and then gives Francesca the key to Ludovico and Gino's cell. During their escape attempt, Gino, Ludovico and Francesca are recaptured by Prospero.

At a feast, Prospero summons Gino and Ludovico. During his execution, Ludovico attempts to kill Prospero. He fails and dies at Prospero's hands. Prospero then casts Gino out of the castle to be killed by the Red Death. In the Black Room, Juliana undergoes her final initiation ceremony, drinking from a chalice and suffering hallucinations of figures who stab at her as she lies on an altar. Awakening from her dream, Juliana is killed by a falcon. As the nobles gather about her body, Prospero comments that Juliana is now married to Satan.

Outside the castle, the remaining villagers beg Prospero for sanctuary, and he orders them to go away. When they refuse to move, he has them shot down with crossbow bolts, deliberately sparing only one small girl.

Meanwhile, Hop-Toad, enraged by the striking of Esmeralda, persuades Alfredo to wear an ape costume to Prospero's masked ball, where no one is allowed to wear red. In the guise of the ape's trainer, Hop-Toad ties Alfredo to a lowered chandelier and raises him above the assembled guests. He then soaks Alfredo with brandy and fatally sets him on fire before fleeing.

During the ball, Prospero notices the entry of the mysterious red-cloaked figure. He and Francesca follow the figure into the Black Room, as Prospero believes it to be an ambassador of Satan. He asks to see its face, to no avail. At the ball, all of the nobles die of the Red Death, but their corpses keep dancing. Prospero asks for Francesca to be spared and given the same high status in Hell as he believes he himself will receive. The figure complies, and Francesca sadly kisses Prospero before leaving. The figure turns out to not be a servant of Satan, but the Red Death itself. Prospero rips off its mask to reveal his own blood-spattered face beneath. Horrified, he attempts to flee through the now-infected crowd, to no avail. Cornering Prospero in the Black Room, the Red Death notes that his soul "has been dead for a long time" and kills him.

The Red Death (Anthrax) later plays with the surviving girl, using the Tarot cards. Other similarly cloaked figures gather around the Red Death, each wearing a different colour: white (Tuberculosis), yellow (Yellow Fever), orange (Scurvy), blue (Cholera), violet (Influenza), and black (Bubonic Plague). They discuss among themselves how many people each of them "claimed" that night. When asked of his work, the Red Death notes that only six are left: Francesca, Gino, Hop-Toad, Esmeralda, the little girl, and an old man from a nearby village. The Red Death declares "Sic transit gloria mundi" (Latin for "Thus passes the glory of the world") and the cloaked figures walk into the night. Over the procession are Poe's words: "And darkness and decay and the Red Death held illimitable dominion over all".

== Cast ==
- Vincent Price as Prince Prospero
  - Price also plays the Red Death during the unmasking scene
- Hazel Court as Juliana, his mistress
- Jane Asher as Francesca, a peasant girl
- David Weston as Gino, Francesca's lover
- Nigel Green as Ludovico, Francesca's father
- Patrick Magee as Alfredo
- John Westbrook as The Red Death
- Paul Whitsun-Jones as Scarlatti
- Robert Brown as Guard
- Skip Martin as Hop-Toad, a dwarf jester
- Verina Greenlaw as Esmeralda, Hop-Toad's dwarf lover
- David Davies as Lead villager
- Sarah Brackett as Grandmother
- Doreen Dawn as Annamaria
- Brian Hewlett as Signor Lampredi
- Harvey Hall as Signor Rivoli

== Production ==
Roger Corman later said he always felt "The Masque of the Red Death" and "The Fall of the House of Usher" were the two best Poe stories. After the success of House of Usher (1960), he strongly considered making Masque as the follow-up.

In 1961, Corman announced he would make Masque from a script by Charles Beaumont to be produced for his Filmgroup Company. However, he later said he was reluctant to move forward because it had several elements similar to The Seventh Seal (1957), and Corman was worried people would say he was stealing from Bergman. "I kept moving The Masque of the Red Death back, because of the similarities, but it was really an artificial reason in my mind", he later said. Eventually, he decided to go ahead and do it anyway.

Another factor in the delay was that Corman had a great deal of trouble coming up with a screenplay with which he was happy. Drafts were written by John Carter, Robert Towne and Barboura Morris, but Corman was not happy with any of them.

There were also a number of rival adaptations of Masque being considered around this time. The Woolner Brothers announced a film based on the story as did producer Alex Gordon, who said he had Price as star.

Corman was pleased with an early draft from Beaumont, which introduced the concept of Prince Prospero being a Satanist. Corman felt this draft still needed work, but Beaumont was too ill to come to England for rewriting. So he hired R. Wright Campbell, who had just made The Secret Invasion with Corman, to come with him. Corman says it was Campbell who introduced the subplot of the dwarf, from another Poe story, "Hop-Frog".

=== Casting ===
Corman cast Patrick Magee, with whom he had previously worked on The Young Racers (1963). "He could find these strange little quirks which he would bring out during his performance, making it a richer and more fully rounded characterization", recalls Corman.

=== Filming ===
AIP had a co-production deal with Anglo-Amalgamated in England, so producers Samuel Z. Arkoff and James H. Nicholson suggested to Corman that the film be made there. This meant the film could qualify for the Eady levy and increase the budget; normally, an AIP film was done in three weeks, but Masque was shot in five weeks. (Although Corman felt that five weeks in England was the equivalent to four weeks in the US because English crews worked slower.) Many of the extensive castle sets at Elstree Studios were left over from Becket, which had been shot earlier that year and had won a BAFTA award for its sets (as well as a nomination for the Academy Award for Best Art Direction). The film was one of the first films shot in colour by cinematographer Nicolas Roeg.

Daniel Haller was used as production designer but not credited to ensure the film qualified as British. Corman says this was why George Willoughby was credited as producer, although it was Corman who was the actual producer.

Corman later expressed dissatisfaction with the final "masque" sequence, which he described as "the greatest flaw" in the film, feeling he did not have enough time to shoot it. He filmed it in one day, which he said would have been enough time in Hollywood but that English crews were too slow.

== Release ==
The film was released in both the U.S. and U.K. on June 24, 1964.

When the film came out, producer Alex Gordon sued AIP, claiming the film was based on a script he had written; however, he lost his case in court.

=== Censorship ===
British censors removed part of a scene where Hazel Court's character asks the devil to send her a demon. The BBC wrongly claimed in a documentary the removed scene was one where she imagines a series of demonic figures attacking her while she lies on a slab.

This was proven when journalist Sandy Robertson, using a letter from producer Samuel Z. Arkoff, finally got the BBFC to release their files on the film. The scene where she is attacked by figures while on a slab was in every print seen in the UK, including one Robertson saw as early as the 1960s. British and US censors required different cuts, which were not restored until the 2018 restoration by Martin Scorsese's film foundation.

Corman recalled years later:

From the standpoint of nudity, there was nothing. I think she was nude under a diaphanous gown. She played the consummation with the Devil, but it was essentially on her face; it was a pure acting exercise. Hazel fully clothed, all by herself, purely by acting, incurred the wrath of the censor. It was a different age; they probably felt that was showing too much. Today, you could show that on six o’clock television and nobody would worry.

== Reception ==
Eugene Archer of The New York Times wrote, "The film is vulgar, naive and highly amusing, and it is played with gusto by Mr. Price, Hazel Court and Jane Asher ... On its level, it is astonishingly good." Variety declared, "Corman in his direction sets a pace calculated to divert the teenage taste particularly, and past experience with Poe makes him a worthy delineator of this master of the macabre. In Price is the perfect interpreter, too, of the Poe character, and he succeeds in creating an aura of terror."

The Monthly Film Bulletin wrote, "Unquestionably Roger Corman's best film to date, The Masque of the Red Death has passages of such real distinction that one wishes he could be persuaded to take himself more seriously ... Where most films of this nature tend simply to pile on the blood, here there is a genuine chill of intellectual evil, because Vincent Price, initiating horrible tortures with a characteristic air of sadistic glee, also conveys a genuine philosophical curiosity as to the unknown territories into which his quest for evil may lead him."

The film was not as successful as other Poe pictures, which Sam Arkoff attributed to it being "too arty farty" and not scary enough. Corman later said, "I think that is a legitimate statement. The fault may have been mine. I was becoming more interested in the Poe films as expressions of the unconscious mind, rather than as pure horror films." Nonetheless, Corman says the film is one of his favourites. Andrew Johnston, writing in Time Out New York concluded: "Elaborate sets and costumes and Nicolas Roeg's lush technicolor photography make this as close as Corman ever came to real greatness."

On the review aggregator website Rotten Tomatoes, 92% of 12 critics' reviews are positive. On Metacritic, the film has a weighted average score of 77 out of 100 based on 8 critics, which the site labels as "generally favorable" reviews.

== Preservation ==
The Masque of the Red Death was preserved by the Academy Film Archive in 2019.

== Merchandise ==
- Dell Comics published a comic book adaptation of the film.
- A novelization of the film was written in 1964 by Elsie Lee, adapted from the screenplay by Charles Beaumont and R. Wright Campbell, and published by Lancer Books in paperback.
- David Lee's soundtrack of the film was finally released on CD in 2012 by Quartet Records.

== Use in music ==
A dialogue from the film appears in the song "And When He Falleth" by Theatre of Tragedy, on the album Velvet Darkness They Fear.

A line of dialogue is also used in the song "Dopethrone" by English metal band Electric Wizard.

In the intro to "Beneath the Mask" by the doom metal band Bell Witch, dialogue from the scene in which Prospero meets the Red Death in the Black Room was sampled.

The movie was also sampled by Entombed, in their song "Living Dead".

== Remake ==
A 1989 remake, executive produced by Corman, was written and directed by Larry Brand. The cast included Patrick Macnee and Adrian Paul.

== See also ==
- Edgar Allan Poe in television and film
- List of cult films
