= Elsie Lee =

American author (1912–1987)

Elsie Lee (née Williams, January 24, 1912 – February 8, 1987) was an American author of over 35 fiction and non-fiction books.

== Life ==
Elsie Williams was born in Brooklyn, New York to Helen (Bogert) and Samuel Byron Williams, Jr. Samuel was a telephone engineer born in Ohio, who worked for Western Electric in New York City. Helen was a housewife. When Elsie was 13 years old, a brother, David G. Williams, was born.

Elsie began cooking at age eight, attended Swarthmore College in Swarthmore, Pennsylvania from 1928 to 1932, and attended the Pratt Institute from 1932 to 1933.

Elsie married Morton Lee on December 27, 1941. She was a member of the Society of Friends (Quakers), the Authors Guild of Authors League of America, and Mensa. Her interests included cats, cooking, music, bridge, two-pack solitaire games, word games, and jigsaw puzzles.

Elsie worked as a librarian for Price, Waterhouse & Company 1937–1942; as an office manager for Reeves Laboratories 1942–1945; a librarian for the Gulf Oil Company 1947–1951; an executive secretary for Andrews, Clark & Buckley 1951-53 (all in New York City); and as a writer from 1945 until her death. She mentions in Elsie Lee's Book of Simple Gourmet Cookery that she lived in Washington for six years, and Hollywood for three.

Elsie began writing in the 1940s, selling her first stories to the Ladies Home Journal. She described her writing this way: "I write fairy tales for grownups, principally women... I am better at characterizations than plots, and best with cats who are unanimously adored by my readers... I will not compromise on the quality of vocabulary and grammar in my books... it is a writer's responsibility to TEACH subtly through entertainment..."

Her pseudonyms included Elsie Cromwell, Jane Gordon, and Lee Sheridan.

Elsie Williams Lee died February 8, 1987, at the age of 75 while living in New York City.

== Works ==
=== Fiction ===
- The Blood Red Oscar (1962)
- Sam Benedict: Cast the First Stone∞ (1963) (The cover wrongly attributes another writer, the prolific tie-in novelist and pulp fiction veteran Norman Daniels, who may initially have had the assignment, but Lee is credited on the title page.) A novelization of the episode "Twenty Aching Years", teleplay by Ellis Marcus.
- The Comedy of Terrors∞ (1964), based on the screenplay by Richard Matheson
- The Masque of the Red Death∞ (1964), based on the screenplay by Charles Beaumont and R. Wright Campbell
- Muscle Beach Party∞ (1964), based on the screenplay by Robert Dillon
- Clouds Over Vellanti (1965)
- Dark Moon, Lost Lady (1965)
- The Doctor's Office (1965)
- The Curse of Carranca (1966)
- The Drifting Sands (1966)
- Mansion of Golden Windows (1966)
- Season of Evil (as Jane Gordon) (1966)
- Sinister Abbey (1967)
- The Spy at the Villa Miranda (1967)
- Fulfillment (1968)
- Barrow Sinister (1969)
- The Governess (as Elsie Cromwell) (1972)
- Satan's Coast (1969)
- Ivorstone Manor (as Elsie Cromwell) (1970)
- The Diplomatic Lover (1971)
- Star of Danger (1971)
- Silence is Golden (1971)
- Wingarden (1971)
- The Passions of Medora Graeme (1972)
- Prior Betrothal (1973)
- The Wicked Guardian (1973)
- Second Season (1973)*
- An Eligible Connection (1975)
- The Nabob's Widow (1976)
- Roommates (1976)
- Mistress of Mount Fair (1977)

∞Novelizations of a television show or screenplay

*dedicated to Anne McCaffrey & Mister Ed

=== Non-fiction ===
- How to Get the Most Out of Your Tape Recording (with Michael Sheridan as Lee Sheridan) (1958)
- More Fun with Your Tape Recordings and Stereo (with Michael Sheridan as Lee Sheridan) (1958)
- The Exciting World of Rocks and Gems (1959)
- The Bachelor's Cookbook (with Michael Sheridan as Lee Sheridan) (1962)
- Easy Gourmet Cooking (1962)
- At Home with Plants: A Guide to Successful Indoor Gardening (1966)
- Second Easy Gourmet Cookbook (1968)
- Elsie Lee's Book of Simple Gourmet Cookery (1971)
- Elsie Lee's Party Cookbook (1974)
