= Secrets (1992 American film) =

- Genre: Drama; Romance
- Based on: Secrets by Danielle Steel
- Written by: William Bast; Paul Huson
- Directed by: Peter H. Hunt
- Starring: Christopher Plummer; Stephanie Beacham
- Theme music composer: Arthur B. Rubinstein
- Country of origin: United States
- Original language: English

Production
- Executive producer: Douglas S. Cramer
- Producer: James H. Brown
- Production locations: Lake View Medical Center - 11600 Eldridge Avenue, Lake View Terrace, Los Angeles, California; L'Orangerie - 903 North La Cienega Boulevard, Los Angeles, California
- Cinematography: Paul Lohmann
- Editor: Frank Morriss
- Running time: 93 minutes
- Production companies: The Cramer Company; NBC Productions

Original release
- Network: NBC
- Release: April 6, 1992

Secrets, also known as Danielle Steel's Secrets, is a 1992 American made-for-television drama film directed by Peter H. Hunt. The film is based upon the 1985 novel of the same name written by Danielle Steel. The drama centers on a television producer and his relationship with the star of his latest TV series.

== Plot ==
The film focuses on the cast and crew of a new TV series called Manhattan, which is shot on location in New York City. Mel Wexler is a successful producer who has become a workaholic since the death of his family in a plane crash. Trying to forget his loss, he throws himself on producing Manhattan. For the lead role, he tries to cast the film star Sabina Quarles, who has a reputation of being hard to work with. She initially declines, explaining she is too good for television. However, because of her past with Mel, she finally accepts the role. They soon start a relationship, but he remains suspicious of her constant visits to San Francisco. She is reluctant to explain why she is going there every month, which makes him think she is having an affair.

Meanwhile, playing her stepson in the series is Bill Warwick, an actor who is a sex symbol. He is married to Sandy, but because of his image, he has to keep their marriage a secret. Sandy was once a great actress, but her drug addiction has turned her into a street prostitute. He thinks a co-starring role could help her to get back on the right path, but she fails to show up at her audition. The role eventually goes to Gaby Smith, a rich actress who graduated from Yale. Bill is upset that his wife wasn't given the role and as a result, treats Gaby with some disdain.

The only colleague supporting her is Jane Adams, who at first hesitated to take the role, because it required her to move from Los Angeles to New York City. Her husband Dan doesn't approve of her acting career and she is therefore a victim of domestic violence. Her teenage daughter Alexa thinks Jane is the cause of the family falling apart and doesn't want to have anything to do with her. While shooting the series, Jane starts a relationship with co-star Zack Taylor, who also bears a dark secret. Three years ago, he spent the night with a girl. It later appeared her mother taped their night and that she was a minor. Since then, she has been blackmailing him for money. Jane feels bad for him and decides to get the video tape by posing as a cop and threatening to sue the girl's mother. It eventually turns out that the girl was already 18 years old.

One night, Sandy is in trouble with a drug dealer and calls Bill for help. He realizes she will never be the same and decides to file for divorce. However, the same night she is murdered and Bill becomes the prime suspect. Gaby tries to help him by giving him a false alibi, but that only makes him look more suspicious. Although she caused him more trouble, he apologizes to her for being mean and they eventually start dating. Meanwhile, the crew of Manhattan decide to shoot a death scene of Bill's character, in case he is found guilty. However, his innocence is eventually proven and he remains on the series.

Meanwhile, Jane is at one point held hostage by her ex-husband, because he found out about her relationship with Zack. Alexa, who was currently staying at Jane's, walks in on them and realizes that actually her father was the antagonist.

At the end of the film, Sabina admits to Mel that she was once impregnated by a politician and gave birth out of wedlock. The son turned out to be very sick and he required the best doctors, who were only available in San Francisco. When Mel finds out, he proposes to Sabina and invites them both to live with him.

== Cast ==
- Christopher Plummer as Mel Wexler
- Stephanie Beacham as Sabina Quarles
- Linda Purl as Jane Adams
- Gary Collins as Zack Taylor
- Ben Browder as Bill Warwick
- Josie Bissett as Gabrielle "Gaby" Smith
- John Bennett Perry as Dan Adams
- Nicole Eggert as Alexa Adams
- Brenda Bakke as Sandy Warwick
