= Secret Invasion (disambiguation) =

Secret Invasion is a 2008 comic-book crossover storyline by Marvel Comics.

Secret Invasion may also refer to:

- Secret Invasion (TV series), a 2023 Disney+ miniseries based on the Marvel Comics storyline
- The Secret Invasion, a 1964 film by Roger Corman
