= Tucker's Witch =

American television series

- Amanda and Dickens
- Genre: Detective; Fantasy; Comedy-drama
- Created by: William Bast; Paul Huson
- Starring: Tim Matheson; Catherine Hicks; Bill Morey; Alfre Woodard; Barbara Barrie
- Theme music composer: Brad Fiedel
- Opening theme: Brad Fiedel
- Ending theme: Brad Fiedel
- Composers: Brad Fiedel (unaired pilot, 1.1, 1.2, 1.3, 1.4, 1.5, 1.8, 1.9, 1.10, 1.11, 1.12); Shirley Walker (1.6); J.A.C. Redford (1.7); George Kahn (co-composer on episodes 1.11, 1.12)
- Country of origin: United States
- No. of seasons: 1
- No. of episodes: 12 (pilot not aired)

Production
- Running time: 60 minutes
- Production company: Hill/Mandelker Films

Original release
- Network: CBS
- Release: October 6, 1982 – June 2, 1983

Tucker's Witch is a detective fantasy television series that aired on CBS from October 6 to November 10, 1982, and again sporadically from March 31 to June 2, 1983. It stars Tim Matheson and Catherine Hicks as a charming married couple, Rick and Amanda Tucker, who own and operate a private detective agency in Laurel Canyon in Los Angeles. Amanda is a witch who possesses psychic and other powers that help the agency solve cases. However, as Amanda is often not in full control of her powers, her witchly exploits also often lead the couple into trouble.

Also in the cast were Bill Morey as the Tuckers' grumpy (but ultimately friendly) police contact Lt. Fisk; Alfre Woodard as the Tuckers' efficient administrative assistant Marcia; and Barbara Barrie as Amanda's cheerful widowed mother Ellen, a herbalist and healer who often visited the Tuckers. Amanda inherited her powers not from Ellen, but from Ellen's deceased mother—witchly powers were said to skip a generation.

Amanda's beige-and-black blue-eyed cat (and familiar), seen prominently in the credits and most episodes, was named Dickens.

== Pilot ==
The show's pilot was first filmed in early 1982 as The Good Witch of Laurel Canyon and starred Art Hindle and Kim Cattrall. In May 1982, CBS announced that the series had been picked up with that title and cast.

However, Cattrall's racy scene in the 1982 film Porky's reportedly caused CBS to demand her replacement. The show was retitled Tucker's Witch and the pilot was reshot with a new cast; Catherine Hicks replaced Cattrall and Tim Matheson was cast in Hindle's role (Hindle had also played a small role in Porky's). The original pilot never aired, but it is now available on the Amazon-owned IMDb TV streaming service along with the show's other episodes.

In a 1986 interview with the Toronto Star, Hindle spoke of his and Cattrall's departures from the series:

All the networks show these pilots to members of the public they pick up on the street and they put push-button responses in their hands. They respond to whether they like the character, don't like the character; or they like the story, don't like the story; like the scene, don't like the scene. She (Cattrall) she didn't do too well with these reponses [sic] so they replaced her. And then I just walked. I had other things to do and I didn't really want to get involved with something they were going to start pulling strings all the time.

== Broadcast history ==
Tucker's Witch aired at 10 p.m. Eastern on Wednesdays in its first run, and proved unable to compete with ABC's Dynasty and NBC's Quincy, M.E.. The show was placed on hiatus after six episodes had aired; months later, it was brought back to burn off the remaining episodes. The program was switched to Thursday for the second half of its run.

At least one episode of the series misspells Catherine Hicks' name, omitting the middle 'E' (Cathrine Hicks).

In later rebroadcasts on the USA Network, the program was retitled The Good Witch of Laurel Canyon, the series' original title.

The show was produced by Hill-Mandelker Films.

== Cast ==
- Tim Matheson as Rick Tucker
- Catherine Hicks as Amanda Tucker
- Bill Morey as Lt. Sean Fisk
- Alfre Woodard as Marcia Fulbright
- Barbara Barrie as Ellen Hobbes

== Ratings ==
Season	Episodes	Start date	End date	Nielsen rank	Nielsen rating
1982-83	12	October 6, 1982	June 2, 1983	78	N/A

== Episodes ==
The series pilot, in which Art Hindle and Kim Cattrall played Rick and Amanda, was never broadcast.

Ted Danson played an elevator killer in the premiere episode, which aired just one week after the premiere of Danson's Cheers. Others Tucker's Witch guest stars included Barry Corbin, Simon Oakland, Joe Penny and Noble Willingham.

No.	Title	Directed by	Written by	Original release date
0	"Pilot"	Peter H. Hunt	William Bast & Paul Huson	UNAIRED
Rick and Amanda are hired to find a serial killer who victimizes women in elevators. With Ted Danson.
1	"The Good Witch of Laurel Canyon"	Peter H. Hunt	William Bast & Paul Huson	October 6, 1982
Rick and Amanda are hired to find a serial killer who victimizes women in elevators. With Ted Danson. This is almost a shot-for-shot and line-for-line remake of the unaired pilot, utilizing as many reused shots as possible surrounding new footage of Hicks and Matheson in the lead roles.
2	"Big Mouth"	Rod Daniel	William Bast & Paul Huson	October 13, 1982
The Tuckers try to discover the identity of someone threatening the life of a TV gossip reporter.
3	"The Corpse Who Knew Too Much"	Harry Winer	Steve Kline	October 20, 1982
Rick and Amanda investigate a potential murder victim who seems to be living a double life.
4	"Curse of the Toltec Death Mask"	Harry Winer	Maryanne Kasic & Michael Scheff	October 27, 1982
A series of murders is tied to a stolen artifact.
5	"Terminal Case"	Randa Haines	Lee Sheldon	November 3, 1982
The Tuckers join forces with a teenager to try to stop a homicidal mayoral candidate. With Nancy Cartwright and Kenneth Mars.
6	"Abra-Cadaver"	Rod Daniel	Bernie Kukoff	November 10, 1982
The Tuckers investigate a mystery involving a dead composer, smuggled diamonds, and a jewel thief.
7	"Dye Job"	Harvey Laidman	Marc Rubin	March 31, 1983
8	"Psych Out"	Peter H. Hunt	Steve Kline	April 7, 1983
9	"Rock Is a Hard Place"	Corey Allen	Lee Sheldon	April 14, 1983
10	"Formula for Revenge"	Harvey Laidman	William Bast & Paul Huson	April 28, 1983
11	"Living and Presumed Dead"	Corey Allen	Steve Kline	May 5, 1983
12	"Murder Is the Key"	Victor Lobl	Bernie Kukoff	June 2, 1983

== Releases ==
The entire series, including the unaired first pilot, is available on the Amazon-owned IMDb TV streaming service.
