= Cell 2455 Death Row =

1954 book by Caryl Chessman

- Author: Caryl Chessman
- Genre: Memoir
- Publisher: Prentice-Hall
- Publication date: 1954

Cell 2455, Death Row: A Condemned Man's Own Story is a 1954 memoir and the first of four books written on death row by convicted robber, rapist and kidnapper Caryl Chessman (27 May 1921 – 2 May 1960). Sentenced to death in 1948 under California's Little Lindbergh Law, Chessman became internationally famous for waging a legal battle to stay alive and fight his conviction and death sentence through voluminous appeals. Chessman became a cause célèbre for the movement to ban capital punishment. Before he was executed in 1960, he was at the time the longest-serving death row inmate in modern history.

== Publishing history ==
Chessman began writing his memoir after San Quentin Prison Warden Harley Teets told him he should do something with his life. Chessman wrote his autobiography, detailing his life in crime, with Teets's encouragement. The book was sold by literary agent Joseph Longstreth, who publicized the book, championing the condemned man's work. When it was published in 1954, the book became a best-seller and was made into a 1955 film of the same name. The great success caused Teets to attempt to prevent Chessman from additional writing. However, subsequent books written by Chessman were smuggled out of prison.
