= Quantez =

1957 film by Harry Keller

- Film poster by Reynold Brown
- Directed by: Harry Keller
- Screenplay by: R. Wright Campbell
- Story by: Ann Edwards; R. Wright Campbell
- Produced by: Gordon Kay
- Starring: Fred MacMurray; Dorothy Malone
- Cinematography: Carl E. Guthrie
- Edited by: Fred MacDowell
- Music by: Herman Stein
- Color process: Eastmancolor
- Production company: Universal International Pictures
- Distributed by: Universal Pictures
- Release date: September 6, 1957
- Running time: 81 minutes
- Country: United States
- Language: English

Quantez is a 1957 American CinemaScope Western film directed by Harry Keller and starring Fred MacMurray and Dorothy Malone.

== Plot ==
Heller's (John Larch) gang of outlaws pull a robbery, kill a man and ride toward Mexico, fleeing a posse. To spend the night, they first head for the border town of Quantez, but are shocked to discover that it has become a ghost town, with no one else there.

Gentry (Fred MacMurray), the gang's most experienced man, finds liquor in the saloon, while Teach (John Gavin), a younger gunslinger, becomes interested in Chaney (Dorothy Malone), who is Heller's woman but upset over the murder during the holdup. Gato, who was raised by Apaches, is infuriated by Heller's referring to him as "breed" and other slights.

Gato (Sydney Chaplin) discovers a warning from Apaches to anyone who comes to town. He seeks out Delgadito (Michael Ansara), the tribe's leader, and proposes they kill the whites and divide the loot. Heller, meantime, is trying to get his partners to do the same, kill the others so there's more money to split among who's left. Gentry and Teach both have feelings for Chaney, who wants to leave town as soon as possible. in the meantime Gato is killed by Delgalito after a betrayal.

A wandering minstrel and artist comes to town, calling himself Puritan (James Barton), and while he paints Heller's portrait, he sings a song about John Coventry, a legendary outlaw in these parts. Puritan is suddenly astonished when he spots Gentry and realizes that he is Coventry. The veteran gunman explains that he is trying to put his violent life behind him for good. After Puritan paints a picture of Chaney Gentry helps him escape. this incites Heller who had planned on killing him for his horse.

As the remaining group preparede to leave Quantez, Heller is killed by an Apache arrow. Gentry, Chaney and Leach run from the attacking Apaches and with arrows raining down, Gentry sacrifices himself, providing cover while Chaney and Teach make their getaway.

== Cast ==
- Fred MacMurray as Gentry / John Coventry
- Dorothy Malone as Chaney
- John Larch as Heller
- John Gavin as Teach
- James Barton as Puritan
- Michael Ansara as Delgadito
- Sydney Chaplin as Gato

== Reaction ==
The New York Times said the film "could hardly be duller".
