= Deadly Invasion: The Killer Bee Nightmare =

- Genre: Horror
- Written by: William Bast; Paul Huson
- Directed by: Rockne S. O'Bannon
- Starring: Robert Hays; Nancy Stafford; Ryan Phillippe
- Music by: Garry Schyman
- Country of origin: United States
- Original language: English

Production
- Executive producers: Robert M. Sertner; Frank von Zerneck
- Producers: William Bast; Paul Huson; Randy Sutter
- Cinematography: Matthew Williams
- Editor: Stephen Adrianson
- Running time: 90 minutes
- Production company: Von Zerneck Sertner Films

Original release
- Network: Fox
- Release: March 7, 1995

Deadly Invasion: The Killer Bee Nightmare is a 1995 American made-for-television natural horror film starring Robert Hays and Nancy Stafford. It originally aired on the Fox Network on March 7, 1995.

== Plot ==
The film opens in rural Texas. A police officer sees a car parked outside an abandoned farmhouse and stops to investigate. A hole has been ripped into one side of the house. He climbs inside and sees some bodies lying on the floor. He tries to wake them up before realizing they are dead. He is then attacked and killed by a swarm of bees.

The film then cuts to Blossom Meadow, California. The Ingram family has just moved there from Boston. Through a series of events, a huge swarm of killer bees invades the town and the family must work together to survive. Eventually, the father manages to pacify the bees using smoke while the rest of the family escape to the barn using an old tunnel. The next day, the family cleans the dead bees out of the house after an exterminator comes to finish them off.

== Cast ==
- Robert Hays as Chad Ingram
- Nancy Stafford as Karen Ingram
- Ryan Phillippe as Tom Redman
- Gina Philips as Tracy Ingram
- Gregory Gordon as Kevin Ingram
- Whitney Danielle Porter as Lucy Ingram
- Dennis Christopher as Pruitt Taylor Beauchamp
- Danielle von Zerneck as Linda
