= The Great Los Angeles Earthquake =

- Genre: Action; Drama; Thriller
- Written by: William Bast; Paul Huson
- Directed by: Larry Elikann
- Starring: Joanna Kerns; Dan Lauria; Lindsay Frost; Joe Spano; Michael T. Weiss; Richard Masur; Ed Begley, Jr.
- Theme music composer: David Shire
- Country of origin: United States
- Original language: English

Production
- Executive producers: Frank von Zerneck; Robert M. Sertner
- Producers: Stratton Leopold; Susan Weber-Gold; Gregory Prange
- Production locations: La Brea Tar Pits - 5801 Wilshire Blvd, Los Angeles, California
- Cinematography: Dennis C. Lewiston
- Editors: Stephen Adrianson; Gregory Prange
- Running time: 178 minutes
- Production company: Von Zerneck Sertner Films

Original release
- Network: NBC
- Release: November 11, 1990

The Great Los Angeles Earthquake is a 1990 American made-for-television disaster film about a massive earthquake that strikes Los Angeles, California. The movie stars Joanna Kerns in the movie's lead role, seismologist Clare Winslow, who tries to warn city leaders of the possibility that a powerful earthquake may strike southern California. The film aired on NBC on November 11–12, 1990.

== Plot ==
The movie opens with a small tremor occurring in the hills outside Los Angeles near a United States Geological Survey (USGS) research post, cutting to a scene of a teenage girl on a date with her boyfriend at the Earthquake Ride at Universal Studios Hollywood. The girl is later revealed to be Heather, daughter of Clare Winslow (Joanna Kerns), a seismologist with the USGS.

Clare and her staff, among whom is her assistant Jerry Soloway (Ed Begley Jr.), have been studying a series of tremors near Los Angeles. With this information, she concludes that there is a better-than-average chance that a massive earthquake will strike along the San Andreas Fault and cause severe damage to Los Angeles, and such an earthquake appears imminent. Against her will, she conducts an interview with Kevin Conrad (Richard Masur), a sensationalist television reporter who prematurely airs it after altering the interview to shock instead of inform, creating a political firestorm and causing tension between Clare and her husband Steve (Dan Lauria).

Steve works closely with high-powered and wealthy real estate developer Wendell Cates (Robert Ginty) who faces losing money and his socio-political reputation from public fear of the possibility of the earthquake. Wendell threatens Clare and attempts to have her fired from her job. Nevertheless, Clare tries to alert the more skeptical city and state government officials including Chad Spaulding (Joe Spano) of the Office of Emergency Management. Fearing political fallout and possible panic, they decide to ignore her warnings.

As this unfolds, Clare's family dynamic is further explored through her strained relationship with teenage daughter Heather (Holly Fields), which is mirrored by the relationship of Clare's mother Anita Parker (Bonnie Bartlett) and Clare's sister Laurie (Lindsay Frost), who are estranged from each other due to Anita's open resentment of Laurie's romantic relationship with LAPD officer Matt (Alan Autry).

When tremors are detected along the smaller, lesser-known Newport-Inglewood fault, city officials call a news conference to alert citizens of the threat. For most residents, however, it will already be too late. Not long after preparations and evacuations begin, the long-feared earthquake strikes, reaching 8.0 in magnitude and quickly followed by a 7.2 aftershock, causing massive damage and killing thousands; among the victims is Anita, who had been trapped in a high-rise condominium elevator with Laurie during the quake. During the time that they are trapped they reconcile shortly before Laurie is rescued by other survivors, but Anita is less fortunate and dies when the elevator crashes to the bottom of the shaft. Another victim is Miguel, son of Clare's housekeeper Sonia, who is fatally injured during the collapse of his high school gymnasium at his graduation rehearsal. Steve Winslow is thought to be dead after being crushed by a wall at the airport, but he is revealed to have survived the quake at the end of the film.

Other deaths include those of Wendell Cates, who is thrown to his death from his skyscraper window, and Chad Spaulding, who is electrocuted while attempting to escape from the USGS safety bunker beneath City Hall. A more redeeming storyline is that of Kevin Conrad, who is transformed from a cut-throat reporter looking for a hot story into a more sensitive and humanitarian character deeply affected by the tragedy and devastation. The remainder of the movie centers on the political and social fallout following the earthquake, and Winslow's attempts to reunite with her family.

== Cast ==
- Joanna Kerns as Dr. Clare Winslow
- Dan Lauria as Steve Winslow
- Bonnie Bartlett as Anita Parker
- Lindsay Frost as Laurie Parker
- Alan Autry as Matt
- Joe Spano as Chad Spaulding
- Holly Fields as Heather Winslow
- Brock Peters as David Motubu
- Stephen Elliott as Dr. Owen Parker
- Robert Ginty as Wendell Cates
- Clarence Gilyard Jr. as Roy Bryant
- Silvana Gallardo as Sonia
- Michael T. Weiss as Larry, The Mayor's City Official Aide
- Charles Siebert as Mayor Frank Baldwin
- Richard Herd as Ray Goodrich
- J. Kenneth Campbell as Todd Harris
- Richard Masur as Kevin Conrad
- Ed Begley Jr. as Jerry Soloway
- Richard Anthony Crenna as Dan Milford
- Kasi Lemmons as Melanie Bryant
- Allan Wasserman as Barry Jacobs
- Ross Kettle as Dirk Van Weelden
- Eloy Casados as Ektor
- Jacob Vargas as Miguel
- Mort Sertner as Sam Lombardi
- John DiSanti as Ben Williams
- Steven Barr as Officer Johnson (credited as Steven V. Barr)
- Patrick Thomas O'Brien as Jim Allen
- Wendy Oates as Mona
- Annabelle Weenick as Wilma
- Matt Roe as Hal Kellogg
- Vladimir Kulich as William De Brujn
- Michael Bendetti as Tim Bradley
- James Hardle as Dave Smithers
- Dean Abston as Ed Mason
- Evelyn Bakerges as Jackie
- Don Pugsley as The Governor
- Jack Rader as Watch Commander
- Felecia M. Bell as Motubu's Secretary
- Catherine Davis Cox as Nurse
- Lance E. Nichols as Paramedic
- Jeff Imada as Teacher

== Production Notes/Broadcast History ==
According to an interview in The Los Angeles Times, the film's theme was inspired by the bombing of Pan Am Flight 103, based on the idea of someone raising the alarm with no action being taken. Executive producer Frank von Zerneck quoted NBC studio executives as saying “L.A., so what? Our network covers 50 states. The attitude of most of the people in the country is, ‘Good for them. It deserves to fall off into the Pacific. People in California are crazy anyway.’”

The film was made over a three-year period for an estimated $9.2 million. Action scenes were filmed on "New York Street" at the Universal Studios lot, the same location used in Earthquake.

Speaking about the production, actress Joanna Kerns said, “The technical advisers thoroughly scared me. I wound up bolting my house to the foundation. I have all my furniture bolted to the walls. I have earthquake kits everywhere-cars, dressing rooms, homes. Lots of water. Emergency numbers.”

== Reception ==
The Washington Post wrote, “Bad as it is, "The Big One" does seem an improvement over the 1974 theatrical release "Earthquake," which also fantasized the destruction of L.A. Why do filmmakers keep returning to this topic? Guilt. They feel sheepish about all the money they make from mediocre entertainment and are haunted by the fear that there's biblical-scale retribution in the works.”

Michael Hill of The Baltimore Sun praised the special effects and compared it to the poignancy of The Day After. He also described it as “a throwback to TV films of more than a decade ago, "The Big One" is a well-made mess of a melodrama, hitting every one of its predictable notes with force and clarity, adding the bombastic percussion of nearly-spectacular special effects to an appropriately responsible cautionary message."

== See also ==
- Dante's Peak
- Volcano
