= Mastering Witchcraft =

1970 book by Paul Huson

- Author: Paul Huson
- Language: English
- Publisher: G.P. Putnam's Sons
- Publication date: 1970
- Pages: 255
- ISBN: 0-552-08992-3
- OCLC: 462789209

Mastering Witchcraft: A Practical Guide for Witches, Warlocks and Covens is a book written by Paul Huson and published in 1970 by G.P. Putnam's Sons, the first mainstream publisher to produce a do-it-yourself manual for the would-be witch or warlock.

The book has been described as one of the main motivators of the so-called "occult explosion" of the 1970s; it was regarded as one of the chief sources of information and ritual for non-Wiccan and non-feminist witchcraft.

== Further references to Mastering Witchcraft and witchcraft ==
- Clifton, Chas S., Her Hidden Children: The Rise of Wicca and Paganism in America, Lanham, MD: Rowman Altamira, 2006, ISBN 0-7591-0202-3.
- Farrar, Stewart, Eight Sabbats for Witches, ISBN 0-919345-26-3.
- Lewis, James R. (ed), Magical Religion and Modern Witchcraft, Baker, James W., "White Witches: Historic Fact and Romantic Fantasy", Albany: State University of New York Press, 1996, ISBN 0-7914-2890-7.
- Skelton, Robin, Spellcraft, Toronto: McClelland and Stewart, 1978, ISBN 0-7710-8177-4.
- Luhrmann, T.M., Persuasions of the Witch's Craft, Cambridge, Massachusetts: Harvard University Press, 1989, ISBN 0-674-66323-3.
- Valiente, Doreen, The Rebirth of Witchcraft, London: Robert Hale, 1989, ISBN 0-7090-3715-5.
