= Cannonball (TV series) =

British/Canadian TV adventure series (1958–1959)

- Genre: Adventure drama
- Directed by: Harry Keller; Lesley Selander; Les Goodwins
- Starring: Paul Birch; William Campbell
- Opening theme: Cannonball theme song
- Countries of origin: Canada; United Kingdom; United States
- Original language: English
- No. of seasons: 1
- No. of episodes: 39 (list of episodes)

Production
- Production locations: Bolton, Ontario, Canada
- Running time: 22 minutes
- Production company: Incorporated Television Company

Original release
- Network: CBC Television (Canada); ABC Weekend TV for ITV (United Kingdom); Syndication (United States)
- Release: October 6, 1958 – July 13, 1959

Cannonball is a British/Canadian adventure drama series starring Paul Birch and William Campbell, and aired on CBC Television in Canada, ABC Weekend TV in the United Kingdom, and in syndication in the United States. Produced by Normandie Productions and ITC Entertainment, the series' interiors were filmed at Canadian Film Industries Limited, a studio in Canada. Exteriors were shot in and around Toronto.

The series is one of the few ITC productions to air on ABC Weekend TV in the UK. Because Associated TeleVision (ATV) owners of ITC, also ran the London weekend and Midlands weekdays ITV companies, they tended to hold the rights for ITC series in order to show each one in the Midlands (where ABC was the weekend operator) during the week. The series aired from October 6, 1958 to July 13, 1959, for 39 episodes in black-and-white.

== Synopsis ==
The series follows the adventures of Mike Malone (Paul Birch), whose (rarely-used) nickname is 'Cannonball', and his younger co-worker Jerry Austin (William Campbell). The two truckers haul cargo across the US and Canada for the fictitious Toronto-based C&A Transport Company Ltd., often encountering danger, people in trouble, and difficult situations along the way.

When not on the road, Jerry rooms with the Malone family at their home at 40 Stanley Avenue in Toronto. The supporting cast includes Beth Lockerbie as Mary Malone, Mike's wife, and Beth Morris as high-school student Ginny Malone and Steve Barringer as grade-school student Butch Malone, the couple's two children. Howard Milsom appears as C&A Transport Company Ltd.'s dispatcher Harry Butler.

The pilot episode has several differences from the series. Apart from the two leads, the entire cast is different, although all the supporting roles (Mary, Ginny, Butch and Harry) are the same. The Malone house is completely different, both inside and outside, and the trucking firm that Mike, Jerry and Harry (Stafford Repp) work for is called Can-Am Trucking. As well, the closing credits feature the Can-Am truck hurtling down U.S. Route 101 in Los Angeles, near the Fallbrook exit, indicating that the pilot was at least partially (if not wholly) shot in LA, although it is explicitly set in Toronto and surrounding area.

The truck depicted in most episodes is a GMC Model 950 COE (cab-over engine) diesel tractor built and sold in the same decade by General Motors.

The duo's adventures come to an end in the series's final episode, "Tunnel Eyes". Austin, who is Malone's co-driver on the truck, has an opportunity to go back and finish college. Malone knows this but realizes Austin will not take the opportunity because it will break up their partnership. In his yearly medical check up, Malone pretends to have tunnel vision (lack of peripheral vision) which means he no longer qualifies to drive trucks. This frees Austin who is able to finish his college education, while Mike takes a desk job within the C&A organization.

== Main cast ==
- Paul Birch as "Cannonball" Mike Malone
- William Campbell as Jerry Austin
- Beth Lockerbie as Mary Malone
- Beth Morris as Virginia "Ginny" Malone
- Steve Barringer as Butch Malone
- Howard Milsom as Harry Butler

== Episode list ==
The original production order appears to be lost and all that remains is a partial list based upon Canadian Broadcasting Corporation and ITV air dates. As titles were not shown on-screen, these titles may be speculative.

- "The Runaway Truck"
- "Pills"
- "Nitro Haul"
- "Small Cargo"
- "The Big Ambulance"
- "Mark Time"
- "The Necklace"
- "Shock"
- "The Attack"
- "The Girl Reporter"
- "Butch"
- "Little Old Man"
- "Sauce for the Goose"
- "The Girl at Joe's Place"
- "Nanette"
- "Lil's Cafe"
- "The Hostage"
- "Fallout"
- "Marooned"
- "Undercover"
- "Vendetta"
- "The Has-been"
- "The Flying Dutchman"
- "Rodeo"
- "Trip to Buffalo"
- "Wild Party"
- "Driving School"
- "Eyewitness"
- "Ginny"
- "Racket"
- "Green-eyed Monster"
- "Sights on Safety"
- "Moose Hunt"
- "Big Buck"
- "Willy"
- "The Dog"
- "Snake Eyes"
- "The Iron Lung"
- "Tunnel Eyes"

== Theme music ==
The Cannonball TV series had a theme that opened and closed each episode composed by Joseph Hooven, Marilyn Hooven, and music packager Raoul Kraushaar.Though IMDb claims the words and music were written and performed by the American country artist Merle Haggard the singer was incarcerated in San Quentin State Prison from 1957 to 1960 and would have been unavailable to work on the series.
