= Robert Wright Campbell =

American novelist (1927–2000)

Robert Campbell
- Born: Robert Wright Campbell; June 8, 1927; Newark, New Jersey, U.S.
- Died: September 23, 2000 (aged 73); Monterey, California, U.S.
- Occupations: screenwriter, author

Robert Wright Campbell (June 9, 1927–September 21, 2000), often credited as R. Wright Campbell or Robert Campbell, was an American screenwriter, author and occasional actor. He was the brother of actor William Campbell and brother in law of Judith Campbell Exner. He wrote ten television series, including Maverick and Marcus Welby, M.D..

== Biography ==
Campbell was born in Newark, New Jersey. He studied painting at Brooklyn's Pratt Institute, intending to be a commercial artist. He was drafted into the US Army during the Korean War. When he asked his brother William how much he earned for acting, he went to Hollywood after his discharge.

=== Hollywood ===
Campbell began writing for anthology series such as Loretta Young Theatre.

Through his brother William, Campbell met Roger Corman for whom he wrote the screen play Five Guns West (1955), which was the first film Corman directed.

Campbell sold two original Western scripts to Universal, Gun for a Coward and Quantez. Both ended up being made with Fred MacMurray.

He also sold two stories to Kirk Douglas's Bryna Productions: King Kelly about a soldier who sets himself up as a ruler in the South West after the Civil War, and The Allison Brothers. Neither was made.

In 1956 he and his brother announced they had purchased a story about John Ashley, Requiem for an Outlaw and intended to make it independently but the film was not made.

Campbell was hired to work on the screenplay Man of a Thousand Faces, the biography of Lon Chaney. The producer deliberately picked a young writer who would not be influenced by "nostalgia". The script was reworked by Ivan Goff and Ben Roberts but Campbell kept his screen credit. All the writers were nominated for Best Screenplay.

Campbell did a fourth script for Universal, Beneath the Roses, but it was not made.

He wrote for several Warner Bros. Television shows such as Maverick, Bronco and Hawaiian Eye.

He reworked Five Guns West for Corman as The Secret Invasion. He planned to follow it with The Deserters another WW2 tale for Corman but it appears to have not been made.

In 1972 he wrote Whistler for Corman, a biopic of James Abbott Whistler.

=== Novels ===
Campbell left screenwriting and turned to novels after visiting Carmel-by-the-Sea, California where he moved to. His first novel was The Spy Who Sat and Waited (1975).

He wrote several novels of Los Angeles that he called "La-La Land" with a hero named James Whistler in Alice in La-La Land and In La-La Land We Trust, a series of Jimmy Flannery novels beginning with The Junkyard Dog (awarded the Edgar Award and Anthony Award for Best Paperback Original) and The Cat's Meow and two Jake Hatch novels.

His 1978 novel, Where Pigeons Go to Die, was adapted into a television film of the same title for NBC by actor and filmmaker Michael Landon.

== Death ==
Campbell died at Hospice House on September 21, 2000, in Monterey, California at the age of 73.

== Legacy ==
On February 2, 2003, the Robert Campbell Balcony over the Harrison Memorial Library's main reading room was named in his honor.

Quentin Tarantino praised Campbell's script for Machine Gun Kelly as the best script Corman ever shot. Filmink argued "Campbell never really got his due as a writer but his reputation has risen in recent years."

== Writings ==
=== Screenplays ===
- The Loretta Young Show - "Thanksgiving in Beaver Run" (1954)
- Five Guns West (1955) - also appeared as actor
- The Star and the Story (1955) - episode "Hand to Hand"
- Medic (1955) - episode "All the Lonely Night"
- Cheyenne (1955–56) - episodes "The Outlander", "The Storm Riders"
- Gun for a Coward (1957)
- Man of a Thousand Faces (1957)
- Quantez (1957)
- Machine Gun Kelly (1958)
- Maverick (1958) - episode "Rope of Cards"
- Teenage Caveman (1958)
- Maverick (1960) - episode "Cruise of the Cynthia B"
- Bronco (1960) - episode "Tangled Trail"
- A Terrible Beauty (1960)
- Hawaiian Eye (1962) .- episode "An Echo of Honor"
- The Young Racers (1963) - also acted
- The Masque of the Red Death (1964)
- The Secret Invasion (1964)
- 12 O'Clock High - episode "The Duel at Mont Sainte Marie" (1967)
- Hells Angels on Wheels (1967)
- Captain Nemo and the Underwater City (1969)
- Marcus Welby, M.D. (1974) - episode "No Charity for the MacAllisters")

=== Novels ===
- The Spy Who Sat and Waited (1975)
- Where Pigeons Go to Die (1978)
- Circus Couronne (1979)
- Malloy's Subway (1981)
- The Junkyard Dog (1986)
- In La-La Land We Trust (1986)
- Alice in La-La Land (1987)
- The 600-Pound Gorilla (1987)
- Hip Deep in Alligators (1987)
- Juice (1988)
- Thinning the Turkey Herd (1988)
- The Cat's Meow (1988)
- Plugged Nickel (1988)
- Nibbled to Death by Ducks (1989)
- Red Cent (1989)
- Sweet La-La Land (1990)
- The Gift Horse's Mouth (1990)
- Boneyards (1992)
- In a Pig's Eye (1992)
- The Wizard of La-La Land (1995)
- Sauce for the Goose (1996)
- The Lion's Share (1996)
- Pigeon Pie (1998)

=== Plays ===
- Wondersmith (1978)
- Quadruped (1991)

=== As Actor Only ===
- Cell 2455, Death Row (1955)
