= Little Boy Blue (novel) =

Semi-autobiographical novel by Edward Bunker

- Book cover
- Author: Edward Bunker
- Language: English
- Genre: Crime fiction
- Publisher: Viking Press
- Publication date: January 1981
- Publication place: United States
- Media type: Print (Hardcover)
- Pages: 301
- ISBN: 0670431079
- OCLC: 6379497
- Dewey Decimal: 813/.54
- LC Class: PS3552.U47 L5 1981

Little Boy Blue is a 1981 semi-autobiographical novel by Edward Bunker that follows his journey into crime.

== Plot summary ==
Alex Hammond is an 11-year-old boy living in Los Angeles, California. His father Clem Hammond is a carpenter who has been struggling to find a job ever since the Great Depression hit the US. Alex's parents are separated and he is very close with his father. However, Clem does not have the resources to support Alex. As a result, he attempts to have outside intervention in supporting Alex such as enrolling him into military school and placing him into foster homes. Alex has run away from all of these places and exhibits temper tantrums because he does not want to be away from his father. His bursts of rage cause authorities and fellow inmates in various institutions to believe that he is crazy, specifically displaying the early traits of psychopathy, such as what is deemed to be "criminal versatility".

The story starts out in 1943, with Alex, Clem, and a social worker going from LA to the Valley Home For Boys in San Fernando Valley where Alex will live. However, he meets up with trouble there because one of his roommates Sammy decides to shoplift from a store. Even though Alex does not steal anything, the housemother Thelma Cavendish decides to punish him. This unfair act in the eyes of Alex causes him to attack her and he rips her dress. He decides to run away with Sammy.

They decide to burglarize a shop during the night, but the owners investigate as the boys are inside. Alex shoots one of the owners with a pistol that he had found when they broke in. Alex runs away, but he gets caught very soon. The police beat him and humiliate him. He finds out that his father died in a tragic accident while attempting to find him.

Alex goes to Juvenile Hall. There, he first sees the brutal violence that is so typical of a prison and other institutions. He quickly learns about the usefulness of such violence and how it can protect him from various injustices. It is also here that he learns about racial identity and racism. His love for reading and his high intelligence sets him apart from the other juvenile delinquents.

He is sent to Camarillo, a state mental institution to determine whether or not he is insane. There, he meets First Choice Floyd and Red Barzo who are two black heroin addicts. They teach him how to play poker and how to box. He also starts to masturbate. Eventually, Alex meets an older teen called Scabs. They regularly sneak out of the institution. One day, Scabs teaches Alex how to hot-wire a car, and they leave. Alex is not able to go back to the institution so he decides to stay in the city. It is not long before the authorities find him and they send him to Pacific Colony.

Alex regards the new institution as a lot worse than Camarillo. One night, one of the members of the staff nicknamed “The Jabber” beats Alex for a minor infraction that he did not commit. He fights back in self-defense, and hurts the Jabber. He gets into trouble again and gets sent back to Juvenile Hall before going to another juvenile institution at Whittier. He gets into one more fight.

At Whittier, Alex gets into more conflicts and he fights so that no one would regard him as a “punk.” (In other words, an inmate who gets sodomized.) He finally decides to escape with a friend named Joe Altabella (also credited as "JoJo").

They escape successfully, to where they hide out with the rest of JoJo's family (primarily Italian-Americans), and Alex meets JoJo’s sister Teresa as well as their younger sister Lisa, the latter of whom seems to hold most affection for Alex over time. At this point in the novel, Alex is 13 and he starts to have sexual feelings for her as well as other girls. Soon, Alex meets Teresa’s 17-year-old boyfriend Wedo and the two boys begin to like each other. However, JoJo and Alex eventually get caught, both at separate instances. This time, Alex gets sent to Preston, an even stricter institution.

At Preston, an older boy, Kennedy, cons Alex out of his shoes. Out of great anger, Alex unscrews a fire hose nozzle and attacks him with it, almost killing him. Alex is unrepentant in the face of authorities. One of them wants to send Alex to San Quentin State Prison, but he is too young at the age of 13 so he is put into solitary confinement. He actually prefers this because he can be away from the violence and he can read in peace. Eventually, he serves his time and gets released into the custody of his aunt and her husband. Alex finds them to be quite hospitable and he helps them by working at their cafe.

However, after having walked out one day, this superficially placid exterior is shattered by the unjustly great indignance towards his lengthy absence from both relatives, his uncle threatening to attack him. Recalling prior attacks upon him ala "The Jabber", Alex threatens to kill them if they dare to attack him. He runs away and finds Wedo again. The older teen has become a heroin addict and must commit robbery in order to support his drug habit. The two youths begin to rob drugstores, taking the money and selling the drugs. One night, they attempt to rob a store, but the owners shoot Wedo with a shotgun. Alex gets hit, in a literary reprise of the event that brought him into the prison system to begin with, and he gives up. The novel ends with him drifting into unconsciousness, surrounded by the police as he is about to be taken to a hospital.
