= Power and Beauty =

- Genre: Crime; Drama; Romance
- Written by: William Bast, Paul Huson, Dave Erickson
- Directed by: Susan Seidelman
- Country of origin: United States
- Original language: English

Production
- Executive producers: Andy Adelson; Tracey Alexander
- Running time: 96 minutes

Original release
- Network: Showtime
- Release: July 2002

Power and Beauty a 2002 biographical drama television movie about the socialite Judith Exner and her romantic relationships with President John F. Kennedy and Chicago Outfit boss Sam Giancana.

The film is based on Exner's 1977 memoir My Story.

== Cast ==
- Natasha Henstridge as Judith Exner
- Kevin Anderson as President John F. Kennedy
- Peter Friedman as Sam Giancana
- John Ralston as Frank Sinatra
- Grant Nickalls as Billy Campbell
- Katie Griffin as Jackie Kennedy
- Tony Nappo as Johnny Roselli

== Reception ==
Variety described the film as "an awfully dull telepic that makes Harlequin romances seem profound by comparison. A memoir of one of history's lesser-known mistresses, the cabler's "Power and Beauty" is fixated on a person who just isn't that interesting, at least the way she's portrayed here". SFGate negatively reviewed the film as a "second-rate biopic".
