= Gun for a Coward =

1957 film by Abner Biberman

- Lobby poster by Reynold Brown
- Directed by: Abner Biberman
- Written by: Robert Wright Campbell
- Produced by: William Alland
- Starring: Fred MacMurray; Jeffrey Hunter; Janice Rule; Chill Wills; Dean Stockwell; Josephine Hutchinson; Betty Lynn; John Larch
- Cinematography: George Robinson
- Edited by: Edward Curtiss
- Color process: Eastmancolor
- Production company: Universal-International Pictures
- Distributed by: Universal Pictures
- Release dates: January 30, 1957 (New York City); March 6, 1957 (Los Angeles)
- Running time: 88 minutes
- Country: United States
- Language: English
- Box office: $1 million (US)

Gun for a Coward is a 1957 American CinemaScope Western film directed by Abner Biberman and starring Fred MacMurray, Jeffrey Hunter and Janice Rule. The film also stars Josephine Hutchinson as MacMurray's mother, despite being less than five years his senior.

== Plot ==
Will Keough is a rancher with two younger brothers, who are called Bless and Hade. They live with their widowed mother, Hannah, whose husband was bitten by a rattlesnake when Bless was a young boy. Ever since that day, Hannah has been determined to shield Bless from the hard life of the West and turn him instead into a refined, gentler soul. In so doing, she sometimes embarrasses Bless in front of the ranch's other men.

Hannah wants to move to the big, sophisticated city of St. Louis and take her middle son with her. Bless refuses at the last minute, then feels guilty when the months go by and his unhappy mother becomes ill and passes away.

Will, meanwhile, builds the ranch into one of the territory's largest. His primary concerns are rustlers and neighbor Audrey, whom he loves and intends to marry, although he has been slow to commit. What he doesn't know is that Audrey has fallen in love with Bless.

Before and during a cattle drive to Abilene, more than once Bless is accused of being cowardly. He fails to adequately back up Hade in a bar fight. A fake rattlesnake is placed on Bless while asleep on the trail, terrifying him.

Bless then alienates Will by confessing that he and Audrey wish to marry. Rustlers stampede the cattle, and Hade is shot to death by a rustler. Will blames Bless, and they fight to a draw after the funeral. Will then allows Bless to lead the posse riding out to confront the rustlers, whereupon Will rides out of town right after he tells Audrey that he approves of their future together.

== Cast ==
- Fred MacMurray as Will Keough
- Jeffrey Hunter as Bless Keough
- Janice Rule as Aud Niven
- Chill Wills as Loving
- Dean Stockwell as Hade Keough
- Josephine Hutchinson as Mrs. Keough
- Betty Lynn as Claire
- Iron Eyes Cody as Chief
- Robert Hoy as Danny
- Jane Howard as Marie
- Marjorie Stapp as Rose
- John Larch as Stringer
- Paul Birch as Andy Niven
- Bob Steele as Durkee
- Frances Morris as Mrs. Anderson

== Production ==
It was one of several films where Jeffrey Hunter was in support of an older male hero.

== See also ==
- List of American films of 1957
