= William Campbell (actor) =

American actor (1923–2011)

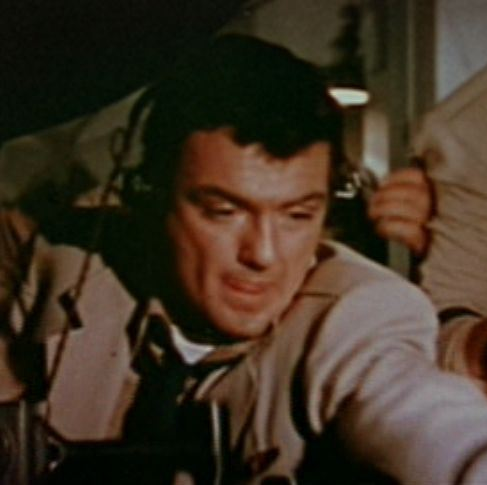
- Campbell in The High and the Mighty (1954)
- Born: October 30, 1923; Newark, New Jersey, U.S.
- Died: April 28, 2011 (aged 87); Los Angeles, California, U.S.
- Other name: Bill Campbell
- Occupation: Actor
- Years active: 1950–1996
- Spouses: Judith Exner (m. 1952; div. 1958) Tereza Campbell (m. 1963)
- Relatives: Jeff Janiak

William Campbell (October 30, 1923 – April 28, 2011) was an American actor. He played supporting roles in major film productions during the 1950s and '60s, and starred in several low-budget B-movies and horror films. He also had several roles in the Star Trek franchise.

== Early life ==
Campbell was born in Newark, New Jersey in 1923. He served in the U.S. Navy during World War II, on a minesweeper in the Pacific theater. He studied acting at the HB Studio, under Herbert Berghof and Uta Hagen.

== Career ==
Campbell's film career began in 1950, with a small part in the John Garfield film The Breaking Point. After several years of similar supporting performances in a number of films, including as a co-pilot in William Wellman's The High and the Mighty (1954), he won his first starring role in Cell 2455 Death Row (1955), a low-budget prison film for Columbia Pictures. He played a death row inmate, based loosely on the true story of Caryl Chessman, who staunchly proclaimed his innocence and obtained numerous reprieves over many years until finally being executed. Campbell's surprisingly powerful performance received generally good notices from critics, but it did very little for his career; his next several roles were again providing support to lead actors, including Man Without a Star (1955), Love Me Tender (1956) in which he became the first person to lip sync portions of a song onscreen (actually recorded on August 24, 1956, by the Ken Darby Trio) with Elvis Presley, and the 1958 film version of Norman Mailer's The Naked and the Dead.

In 1958, Campbell co-starred with Paul Birch in Cannonball, a short-lived television series about truck drivers. After that, he worked for more years in small parts in increasingly lower grade movies.

Campbell made two guest appearances on Perry Mason in 1959 and 1960. In his first appearance he played the title character and murder victim Allen Sheridan in "The Case of the Artful Dodger," then he played murderer and title character Jim Ferris in "The Case of the Ill-Fated Faker."

In 1963, Campbell began a brief association with Roger Corman, starring in the director's The Young Racers that year. The auto-racing-themed movie, written for the screen by Campbell's brother Robert Wright Campbell, was shot in Ireland. After production was completed, the film's sound man, Francis Ford Coppola, talked Corman into allowing Coppola to remain in Ireland with a small crew and direct a low-budget horror film, to be produced by Corman. Coppola promised it would be the cheapest film Corman was ever involved in. Shot for approximately $40,000, the resultant film, Dementia 13 (1963), was an atmospheric and violent horror thriller clearly made in imitation of Psycho. Campbell starred as a moody loner who at one point becomes the chief suspect in a series of gruesome axe killings; Patrick Magee and Luana Anders led the supporting cast. Many years later, Campbell would provide an audio commentary for the film's DVD release.

Campbell also starred in another Corman-produced horror yarn. Filmed in 1963 in Yugoslavia under the title Operacija Ticijan, again with Magee in the cast, the film was never released in its original form. It was re-edited, re-dubbed, and briefly shown on television as Portrait in Terror. Years later, additional footage was shot in California, first by Jack Hill, then by Stephanie Rothman, transforming what was once a spy thriller into the story of a vampire stalking the streets of Venice, California. Retitled Blood Bath, although it also became known as Track of the Vampire, the film received a limited theatrical release in 1966. Campbell also filmed The Secret Invasion in Yugoslavia, directed by Roger Corman and written by his brother Robert Wright Campbell. Campbell was the only one of the team of commandos not given screen credit above the title.

One year previously in 1965 he landed a supporting role as a reporter in the classic suspense horror; Hush...Hush, Sweet Charlotte. In Blood Bath Campbell's character was an artist who killed women and hid their bodies inside his sculptures; he is also a vampire who can freely walk during the daylight in search of victims. However, the fanged vampire was confusingly played by another actor who did not resemble Campbell. Like Dementia 13, the film has managed to develop a following despite its deficiencies. In the early 1990s, Video Watchdog magazine devoted lengthy articles in three separate issues painstakingly detailing the convoluted production history of this strange but fascinating movie.

Campbell had guest-starring roles in the Star Trek franchise, appearing first as the mischievous super-being Trelane in an episode of the original series called "The Squire of Gothos". Campbell also appeared twice as the Klingon Captain Koloth. Campbell first played Koloth on the original Star Trek series in the episode "The Trouble with Tribbles". He reprised the role on the series Star Trek: Deep Space Nine episode entitled "Blood Oath", some thirty years later. Campbell appeared at several Trek conventions in the 1980s and 1990s. His last appearance was at the convention organized by Creation Entertainment at the Las Vegas Hilton in August 2006.

After retiring from acting, Campbell worked for the Motion Picture & Television Fund as its chief fundraiser.

== Personal life ==
Campbell was married twice. His first marriage was to Judith Exner in 1952. They divorced in 1958. He was portrayed by Grant Nickalls in a television film about Exner, Power and Beauty (2002). He married Tereza in 1963. They were married until his death.

Campbell is a relative of Jeff Janiak, vocalist of the band Discharge.

=== Death ===
Campbell died on April 28, 2011, at the Motion Picture & Television Country House and Hospital in Woodland Hills, California.

== Partial filmography ==
=== Film ===
- The Breaking Point (1950) as Concho
- Breakthrough (1950) as Cpl. Danny Dominick (as Bill Campbell)
- Operation Pacific (1951) as The Talker (credited as Bill Campbell)
- Inside the Walls of Folsom Prison (1951) as Nick Ferretti
- The People Against O'Hara (1951) as Frank Korvac
- Holiday for Sinners (1952) as Danny Farber
- Battle Circus (1952) as Captain John Rustford
- Small Town Girl (1953) as Ted, News Photographer
- Code Two (1953) as Companion
- Big Leaguer (1953) as Julie Davis
- Escape from Fort Bravo (1953) as Cabot Young
- The High and the Mighty (1954) as Hobie Wheeler
- Battle Cry (1955) as Pvt. 'Ski' Wronski
- Man Without a Star (1955) as Jeff Jimson
- Cell 2455, Death Row (1955) as Whit Whittier
- Running Wild (1955) as Ralph Barton
- Backlash (1956) as Johnny Cool
- Love Me Tender (1956) as Brett Reno
- Man in the Vault (1956) as Tommy Dancer
- Eighteen and Anxious (1957) as Pete Bailey
- The Naked and the Dead (1958) as Brown
- Money, Women and Guns (1958) as Clinton Gunston
- The Sheriff of Fractured Jaw (1958) as Keeno
- Natchez Trace (1960) as Virgil Stewart
- Night of Evil (1962) as Chuck Logan
- The Young Racers (1963) as Joe Machin
- Dementia 13 (1963) as Richard Haloran
- Operacija Ticijan (1963) as Toni
- The Secret Invasion (1964) as Jean Saval
- Hush… Hush, Sweet Charlotte (1964) as Paul Marchand
- The Money Trap (1965) as Jack Archer (uncredited)
- Portrait in Terror (1965) as Tony
- Blood Bath (1966) as Antonio Sordi
- Pretty Maids All in a Row (1971) as Grady
- Black Gunn (1972) as Rico

=== Television ===
- Cannonball: 47 episodes (1958–1959) – Jerry Austin
- The Millionaire: Tom Hampton (1959) – Tom Hampton
- Perry Mason: Season 3 Episode 9 "The Case of the Artful Dodger" (1959) – Allen Sheridan
- Perry Mason: Season 4 Episode 3 "The Case of the Ill-Fated Faker" (1960) – Jim Ferris
- Philip Marlowe: "Murder in the Stars" (1960) – Rich Darwin
- Stagecoach West: "Never Walk Alone" (1961) – Cole Eldridge
- Gunsmoke: "Old Dan" (1962) – Luke Fetch
- Combat!: "Soldier of Fortune" (1965) – Pvt. Ed Wallace
- The Wild Wild West: "The Night of the Freebooters" (1966) – Sergeant Bender
- Star Trek: "The Squire of Gothos" (1967) – Trelane
- Star Trek: "The Trouble with Tribbles" (1967) – Koloth
- Combat!: "Nightmare on the Red Ball Run" (1967) – Corporal Sloan
- It Takes a Thief: "A Spot of Trouble" (1968) – Pierre Gropius
- Bonanza: "The Late Ben Cartwright" (1968) – Wilburn White
- O'Hara, U.S. Treasury: "Operation: Big Store" (1971) – Arnie Christenson
- Adam-12 "Ambush" (1971) – Charlie Shanks
- Ironside: "Buddy, Can You Spare a Life?" (1972) – Walter Booth
- Emergency! "Peace Pipe" (1972) – Sam Jenks; "Fools" (1974) – Ned Tanner
- Adam-12 "North Hollywood Division" (1974) – Joe Dugan
- The Streets of San Francisco: "Chapel of the Damned" (1974) – Cowns
- Hec Ramsey: "Scar Tissue" (1974) – Vince Alexander
- The Streets of San Francisco: "Flags of Terror" (1974) – Callendar
- Police Woman: "Ice" (1975) – Emery Kehoe
- Gunsmoke: "The Squaw" (1975) – Striker
- Shazam!: "The Contest" (1976) – Officer Ken Taylor
- The Streets of San Francisco: "Underground" (1976) – Johnny Blackwell
- The Hardy Boys/Nancy Drew Mysteries: "Will the Real Santa Claus...?" (1977) – Markham
- Quincy, M.E.: "Quincy's Wedding", Parts 1 & 2 – Doctor Sutter (1983)
- The Return of the Six Million Dollar Man and the Bionic Woman, TV movie (1987) – General Forest
- Star Trek: Deep Space Nine: "Blood Oath" (1994) – Koloth
- Kung Fu: The Legend Continues: "Chill Ride" (1996) – Wolfe

=== Video games ===
- Star Trek: Judgment Rites (1995, CD-ROM) – Trelane
