= Ross Kettle =

South African actor, writer and director

- Born: 16 September 1961 (age 64); Durban, South Africa
- Occupations: Actor; writer; director; producer
- Spouse: Michelle Forbes (m. 1990; div. 1999)

Ross Kettle (born 16 September 1961) is a South African actor, writer, director and producer. He is best known for portraying Jeffrey Conrad on the American television soap opera Santa Barbara from 1986 to 1989. For the role, he was nominated for the Daytime Emmy Award for Outstanding Younger Actor in a Drama Series in 1988.

Kettle later turned to writing and directing. His play Soweto's Burning, about racial conflict in South Africa, was staged in Los Angeles in 1992. He subsequently adapted the play into the 1999 film After the Rain, which he wrote and directed and which starred Paul Bettany, Louise Lombard and Ariyon Bakare.

== Career ==
=== Acting ===
Kettle began working in the South African film industry in the late 1970s and early 1980s before moving into acting. His early screen work included the South African television production Meisie van Suidwes and a screen adaptation of Hamlet, in which he played Lucianus.

After moving to the United States, Kettle appeared in the CBS soap opera As the World Turns as Lord Stewart Markam Cushing. In 1986, he guest-starred in an episode of the police drama Cagney & Lacey.

That year, Kettle joined the cast of the NBC soap opera Santa Barbara as Jeffrey Conrad. He remained with the series until 1989. His performance earned him a nomination for Outstanding Younger Actor in a Drama Series at the 15th Daytime Emmy Awards in 1988.

Following Santa Barbara, Kettle continued to work in American television. In 1990, he appeared as Avery Thompson in Hunter and as Dirk van Weelden in the television film The Great Los Angeles Earthquake. He later made two appearances on Murder, She Wrote, first as Ian O'Bannon in the two-part 1993 episode "Nan's Ghost" and later as Dennis McSorley.

His other television work included appearances in Babylon 5, Masters of Sex and the miniseries The Diamond Hunters. His later film appearances included Playing God (1997), Swing Kids (2018) and Hollow Point (2019).

=== Writing and directing ===
In addition to acting, Kettle began writing for the stage. His play Soweto's Burning explored relationships and racial conflict against the background of apartheid-era South Africa. A Los Angeles production of the play was reviewed by the Los Angeles Times in 1992.

Kettle subsequently adapted Soweto's Burning for the screen as After the Rain. Set in apartheid-era South Africa, the drama centres on an Afrikaner soldier whose relationship with his girlfriend is destabilised after she befriends a Black South African man.

Kettle wrote and directed the film, which starred Paul Bettany as Steph, Louise Lombard as Emma and Ariyon Bakare as Joseph. The film was produced in South Africa and was released in 1999.

Kettle later worked in unscripted television as a producer, including work associated with Discovery Channel programming.

== Filmography ==
=== Film ===
Year	Title	Role	Notes
1993	Lethal Ninja	Joe Ford	
1997	Playing God	Resident surgeon	
1999	After the Rain		Writer and director
2018	Swing Kids	Brigadier General Roberts	
2019	Hollow Point	Attorney Stevens	

=== Television ===
Year	Title	Role	Notes
1985	As the World Turns	Lord Stewart Markam Cushing	
1986	Cagney & Lacey	Michael Grey	Episode: "The Marathon"
1986–1989	Santa Barbara	Jeffrey Conrad	Series regular
1990	Hunter	Avery Thompson	Episode: "Lullaby"
1990	The Great Los Angeles Earthquake	Dirk van Weelden	Television film
1993	Murder, She Wrote	Ian O'Bannon	2 episodes
1995	Murder, She Wrote	Dennis McSorley	Episode: "Game, Set, Murder"
1997	The Principal	Alan Paton	Miniseries
1998	Babylon 5	Ruell	Episode: "The Very Long Night of Londo Mollari"
2001	The Diamond Hunters	Ken Hartford	Miniseries
2014	Masters of Sex	Tony	Episode: "Mirror, Mirror"

=== Crew and production ===
Year	Title	Role
1979	Zulu Dawn	Production assistant
1982	Safari 3000	Assistant director
1999	After the Rain	Writer, director
2011–2013	Shark Week	Producer
2013	Shipwreck Men	Consulting producer

== Awards and nominations ==
Year	Award	Category	Work	Result
1988	Daytime Emmy Awards	Outstanding Younger Actor in a Drama Series	Santa Barbara	Nominated
