= Caryl Chessman =

American criminal and writer (1921–1960)

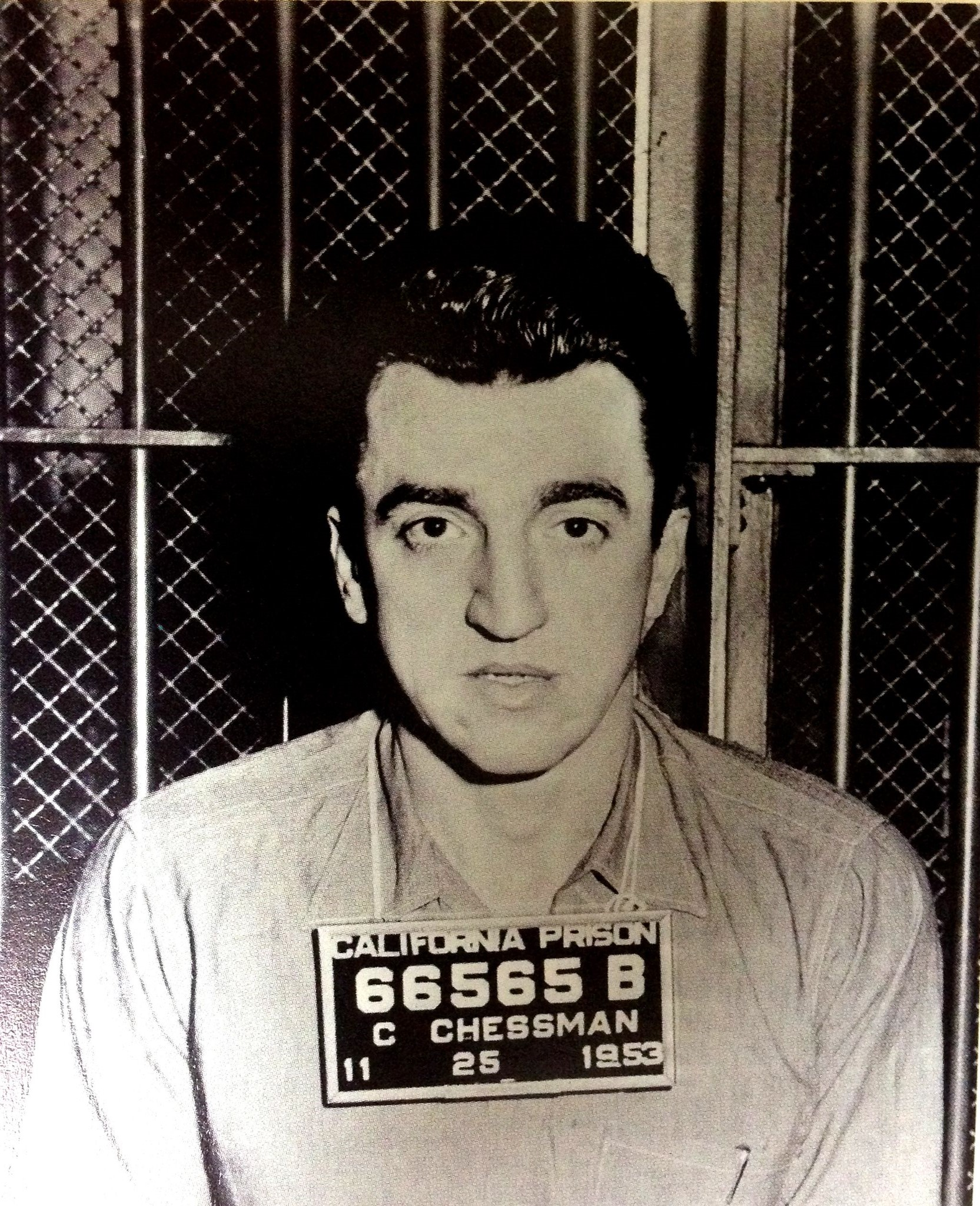
- Chessman on November 25, 1953
- Born: Carol Whittier Chessman; May 27, 1921; St. Joseph, Michigan, U.S.
- Died: May 2, 1960 (aged 38); San Quentin State Prison, California, U.S.
- Status: Executed by gas chamber
- Convictions: Kidnapping for the purpose of robbery with infliction of bodily harm (3 counts); Kidnapping for the purpose of robbery Attempted rape Assault with a deadly weapon First degree robbery (8 counts); Attempted robbery Robbery; Grand theft
- Penalty: Death

Details
- Date apprehended: January 23, 1948
- Imprisoned at: San Quentin State Prison

Caryl Whittier Chessman (May 27, 1921 – May 2, 1960) was a convicted robber, kidnapper, serial rapist, and writer who was sentenced to death for a series of crimes committed in January 1948 in the Los Angeles area. Chessman was charged with 17 counts and convicted under a loosely interpreted "Little Lindbergh law" that defined kidnapping as a capital offense under certain circumstances. His case attracted worldwide attention, and helped propel the movement to end the use of capital punishment in the state of California.

While in prison, Chessman filed numerous legal actions of dubious merit that led to him being considered vexatious. One judge wrote in 1957: "[Chessman is] playing a game with the courts, stalling for time while the facts of the case grow cold." Chessman wrote four books, including his 1954 memoir Cell 2455, Death Row. The book was adapted for the screen in 1955 and stars William Campbell as a character modelled after Chessman.

Chessman was executed in the San Quentin gas chamber on May 2, 1960.

== Early years ==
Chessman was born Carol Whittier Chessman (Chessman himself later changed the spelling to Caryl) in St. Joseph, Michigan, the only child of Serl Whittier and Hallie Lillian (née Cottle) Chessman, both devout Baptists. In 1922, the family relocated to Glendale, California. Chessman's father became despondent after failing at a series of jobs, and attempted suicide twice. In 1929, Chessman's mother was paralyzed in a car accident. As a child, Chessman had asthma, which left him weak, and he also contracted encephalitis, which he later claimed changed his personality. After recovering, he began to rebel against his parents' strict Baptist teachings by committing petty crimes. The family was hit hard by the Depression, and Chessman later recalled that he stole food and other items as an adolescent to help his parents.

In July 1937, Chessman was caught stealing a car and sent to Preston School of Industry (also known as Preston Castle), a reform school in Northern California. He was released in April 1938, only to return a month later after stealing another car. In October 1939, Chessman was sent to the Los Angeles County Road Camp after yet another car theft. It was there that he met a group of young criminals known as the "Boy Bandit Gang." After his release from the road camp he joined the gang and, in April 1941, was arrested in connection with a number of gang-related robberies and shootouts with police. As the gang's leader, Chessman was convicted of robbery and sent to San Quentin State Prison, then transferred to the California Institution for Men in Chino. He escaped in October 1943 but was arrested a month later. Convicted on another robbery charge, Chessman was sentenced to five years to life and served the minimum, mostly at Folsom State Prison. He was released in December 1947 and returned to Glendale.

== Crimes and conviction ==
In the first three weeks of January 1948, a number of robberies and thefts were reported throughout the Greater Los Angeles Area. On January 3, two men robbed a haberdashery in Pasadena with a .45 caliber semi-automatic pistol. On January 13, a 1946 Ford coupe was stolen from a Pasadena street. On January 18, a man driving a car described as a 1947 Ford coupe fitted with a police red light stopped a vehicle near Malibu Beach, then used a .45 caliber pistol to rob the vehicle's occupants. Later that day a second couple was robbed in the same manner near the Rose Bowl. Police quickly began to suspect a common perpetrator, and Los Angeles newspapers dubbed the suspect "The Red Light Bandit." On January 19, a third couple was robbed as they sat parked on a hill in West Pasadena, and the woman, Regina Johnson, was forced to perform oral sex on her assailant. On January 22, a fourth couple returning home from a church dance was pulled over on Mulholland Drive. The assailant dragged the girl, 17-year-old Mary Alice Meza, a short distance to his vehicle. Her boyfriend then drove away and was pursued by the assailant. After an unsuccessful attempt to force the male victim off the road, the perpetrator drove Meza to a secluded area where he forced her to engage in oral and anal sex, threatening to kill her boyfriend if she did not comply.

The following day, police in North Hollywood attempted to stop a 1946 Ford coupe matching the description given by Meza and her boyfriend, and also by witnesses to a robbery at a clothing store in Redondo Beach earlier that day. After a high-speed chase, the vehicle's occupants, Chessman and David Knowles, were captured and arrested. After a 72-hour interrogation, during which Chessman later claimed he was beaten and tortured, Chessman confessed to the "Red Light Bandit" crimes. He was also positively identified by the rape victims, Johnson and Meza. In late January 1948, Chessman was indicted on 18 counts of robbery, kidnapping, and rape. After a three-week trial in May, he was convicted on 17 of the 18 counts, and was sentenced to death. The prosecution was led by district attorney J. Miller Leavy. Chessman's accomplice, Knowles, was tried and convicted as an accessory in the store robberies, but his conviction was reversed on appeal in 1950 due to an absence of direct incriminating evidence and "impermissible abuse of the law."

== Appeals and controversy ==
Part of the controversy surrounding the Chessman case stemmed from the state's unusual application of the death penalty. At the time, under California's version of the "Little Lindbergh Law", a crime that involved kidnapping with bodily harm could be considered a capital offense. Two of the counts against Chessman alleged that he dragged Johnson 22 feet from her car before demanding oral sex, and that he abducted Meza against her will, driving her a considerable distance before raping her. The court ruled that both actions fit the law's definition of kidnapping with bodily harm, thus making Chessman subject to the death penalty under the law.

Chessman asserted his innocence from the outset, arguing throughout the trial and the appeals process that he was alternately the victim of mistaken identity, or of a conspiracy to frame him; he also claimed to know the identity of the real perpetrator, but refused to reveal it. He further alleged that the confession he signed during his initial police interrogation was coerced through force and intimidation.

Over the course of nearly twelve years on death row Chessman filed dozens of appeals, acting as his own attorney, and successfully avoided eight execution deadlines, often by a few hours. Most appeals were based on assertions that he was forced to go to trial unprepared; that the trial itself was unfair; that confessions obtained by force and intimidation and promises of partial immunity were used in evidence against him; that California's "Little Lindbergh Law" was unconstitutional; and that the transcript of record forwarded upon appeal to the state supreme court was incomplete, and important parts of the proceedings were missing or incorrectly recorded. In 1957 the U.S. Supreme Court ordered the State of California to conduct a full review of the transcripts. The review concluded that the transcripts were substantially accurate.

Chessman also took his case to the public through letters, essays and books. His four books—Cell 2455, Death Row; Trial by Ordeal; The Face of Justice; and The Kid Was a Killer—became bestsellers. He sold the rights to Cell 2455, Death Row to Columbia Pictures, which made a 1955 film of the same name, directed by Fred F. Sears, with William Campbell as Chessman. Chessman's middle name, Whittier, was used as the surname of his alter ego protagonist in the film. The manuscript of his fourth book, The Kid Was a Killer, was seized by San Quentin warden Harley O. Teets in 1954 as a product of "prison labor". It was eventually returned to Chessman in late 1957, and published in 1960.

Chessman's books and public campaign ignited a worldwide movement to spare his life, while focusing attention on the larger question of the death penalty in the United States, at a time when most Western countries had abandoned it, or were in the process of doing so. The office of California Governor Pat Brown was flooded with appeals for clemency from noted authors and intellectuals from around the world, including Aldous Huxley, Ray Bradbury, Norman Mailer, Dwight Macdonald, and Robert Frost, and from such other public figures as former First Lady Eleanor Roosevelt, Marlon Brando, and Billy Graham.

The Chessman affair put Brown, an opponent of the death penalty, in a difficult position. He was unable to grant Chessman executive clemency as the California Constitution required the commutation of a two-time felon's death sentence to be ratified by the California Supreme Court, which declined ratification by a vote of 4–3. After a long period of inaction Brown finally issued a 60-day stay a few hours before the February 19, 1960, scheduled execution. He issued the stay, he said, out of concern that the execution could threaten the safety of President Dwight D. Eisenhower during an official visit to South America, where the Chessman case had inflamed anti-American sentiment. Pat Brown's son and future Governor Edmund G. "Jerry" Brown unsuccessfully lobbied his father to spare Chessman.

== Execution ==
Brown's stay of execution, along with Chessman's last appeals, ran out in April 1960, and Chessman finally went to the gas chamber at San Quentin Prison on May 2. According to some sources, a last-minute attempt by a California Supreme Court justice to impose a new stay pending a habeas corpus motion failed when a court secretary misdialed the prison's phone number; by the time the call was routed to the execution chamber, the execution had begun and could not be halted. During the execution Chessman vigorously nodded his head, a pre‑arranged signal to reporters that he was experiencing pain. Chessman's body was cremated, as per his wishes, at the Mount Tamalpais Mortuary and Cemetery in San Rafael, California. He requested that his ashes be interred with his parents' at Forest Lawn Memorial Park in Glendale, but Forest Lawn refused the request on "moral grounds". His ashes were buried at the Mount Tamalpais Cemetery, then disinterred in 1974 by Chessman's attorney Rosalie Asher and scattered off the coast of Santa Cruz Island.

== In popular culture ==
Megan Terry's play, The People vs Ranchman, loosely based on Chessman's crimes and punishment, was produced Off-Broadway in New York during the 1968–1969 season.

Author Dominique Lapierre visited Chessman several times during his incarceration. Lapierre was then a young reporter working for a French newspaper. His account of Chessman appears in the book A Thousand Suns.

Artist Bruce Conner created his sculpture Child in 1959–60 as an homage to Chessman's execution.

The radio version of Dragnet referenced the Chessman case and the Redlight Bandit in a 1949 episode. The producers changed the storyline of his crimes, allowing the rape victim to die in the fictitious version, justifying the death penalty.

Chessman's execution is referenced in Lucio Fulci's 1969 giallo One on Top of the Other, in which the character of George Dumurrier (Jean Sorel) is prepared to be executed in San Quentin's gas chamber. Not only were these sequences shot on location in San Quentin, but several of the prison personnel who were responsible for Chessman's death acted in them; a fact that was especially highlighted in the film's trailer.

Chessman is mentioned in Neil Diamond's 1970 song "Done Too Soon" and in French singer Nicolas Peyrac's song "So far away from LA".

Chessman is mentioned in the song "Broadway Melody of 1974" on Genesis's album The Lamb Lies Down on Broadway: "Caryl Chessman sniffs the air and leads the parade / He knows, in a scent, you can bottle all you made."

Chessman's execution in the gas chamber is mentioned in Richard Brautigan's 1967 novella Trout Fishing in America.

Chessman's execution is referenced in the 1979 novel Jailbird by Kurt Vonnegut.

In 1977, Alan Alda starred in an NBC television movie about Chessman's life, Kill Me If You Can. This was sometimes shown, subsequently, as The Caryl Chessman Story.

The song "The Ballad of Caryl Chessman", written by the songwriting team of Al Hoffman and Dick Manning, includes the chorus "let him live, let him live, let him live". It was a minor hit single for Ronnie Hawkins two months before Chessman's execution.

Country music star Merle Haggard stated in an interview in 1995 that many years earlier, when he was a prison inmate, observing Chessman's preparations for his execution helped to set him on the straight and narrow. Chessman is mentioned in the unreleased song "un tal Brigitte Bardot" by Argentinian rock band "Patricio Rey y sus redonditos de ricota".

== See also ==
- Capital punishment in California
- List of people executed in California
- List of people executed in the United States in 1960

Executions carried out in California
Preceded by Lawrence Wade April 22, 1960	Caryl Chessman; May 2, 1960	Succeeded by James Hooton May 13, 1960
Executions carried out in the United States
Preceded by Columbus Boggs – Alabama April 29, 1960	Caryl Chessman – California; May 2, 1960	Succeeded by Pablo Vargas – New York May 12, 1960
