= The Young Racers =

1963 film by Roger Corman

- US film poster
- Directed by: Roger Corman
- Written by: R. Wright Campbell
- Produced by: Roger Corman
- Starring: Mark Damon; William Campbell; Luana Anders
- Cinematography: Floyd Crosby
- Edited by: Ronald Sinclair
- Music by: Les Baxter
- Production company: Alta Vista Productions
- Distributed by: American International Pictures
- Release date: January 1963
- Running time: 84 minutes
- Country: United States
- Language: English
- Budget: $90,000

The Young Racers is a 1963 sports drama film directed by Roger Corman and starring Mark Damon, William Campbell, Luana Anders and Patrick Magee. It is based on the Formula One races in Europe.

== Plot ==
Joe Machin (William Campbell), an American racecar driver determined to win at any cost. He wins the Monaco Grand Prix through reckless driving, drawing scorn from his fellow drivers.

Joe also becomes involved in extramarital affairs, using his unwitting brother, Robert (R. Wright Campbell), to divert the suspicions of his wife, Sesia (Marie Versini). Meanwhile, racer turned writer Steve Children (Mark Damon) arrives in Monte Carlo to meet his girl friend, Monique (Béatrice Altariba), and sees her in an emotional scene with Joe, with whom she has had an affair.

Steve decides to write a book exposing Joe and his tactics on and off the track. He arranges to meet Joe and accompany him to Belgium, where another Grand Prix is to take place. When they return to England, Steve's plan is revealed to Joe. In a race at Aintree, the two men participate in a personal grudge match on the racetrack, but when Steve's car swerves wildly, Joe has a change of heart. He spins his car to avoid hurting Steve, but crashes, sustaining serious injuries. At the hospital Steve meets Joe's brother, who explains that Joe's outward bravado hides a sensitive and confused personality. Later, Steve finds Joe considerably changed, and their friendship becomes a lasting one.

== Cast ==
- Mark Damon as Stephen Children
- William Campbell as Joe Machin
- Luana Anders as Henny
- Patrick Magee as Sir William Dragonet
- John McLaren as team manager Lotus
- R. Wright Campbell as Robert Machin
- Milo Quesada as Italian Pilot
- Margarete Robsahm as Lea
- Béatrice Altariba as Monique
- Christina Gregg as Daphne
- Marie Versini as Sesia Machin

== Production ==
The Young Racers was shot on location in Europe to take advantage of the real life grand prix circuits. Director Roger Corman hired Robert Wright Campbell, brother of the lead actor, William Campbell, to write the script. Corman wanted Campbell to base the script on an earlier screenplay he had written about a young American who gets involved with a great bullfighter in Spain.

The film was shot from race to race during the 1962 Formula One season, with the cast and crew taking breaks in between. Races took place in June and July at Monaco, Rouen, Spa in Belgium and England. Corman's assistant was sent ahead to scout the locations and coordinate with the racing teams. Leading competitors such as Jim Clark and Bruce McLaren were featured.

Francis Ford Coppola is credited not only as the sound recordist, but also as the second unit director on The Young Racers, in addition to appearing in the film in an uncredited role. Most significantly, working around the shooting schedule of The Young Racers, Coppola was allowed by Corman to use the same set, crew and actors Luana Anders, William Campbell and Patrick Magee to shoot his first feature, Dementia 13.

Screenwriter Robert Towne is credited as the second assistant director.

== Reception ==
Quentin Tarantino described himself as "a big fan of" The Young Racers. He noted: "Where this supposed bad ass driver takes bedding women as seriously as he does winning races. Action flick meets romantic drama, but nicely balanced."

== Home media ==
The Young Racers' was released in a Region 1 DVD on September 11, 2007, as part of the box set The Roger Corman Collection.

== Novelization ==
A tie-in paperback novelization of The Young Racers screenplay, by Harold Calin — a ubiquitous paperback novelist of the era, best known for his novels of men at war — was commissioned by Lancer Books and released to coincide with the release of the film. Its text occupies 120 pages of very small print (typical of the period) and the copyright is © 1963 Alta Vista Productions. The price on the cover: 40¢.

== See also ==
- List of American films of 1963
