= Cell 2455 Death Row (film) =

1955 film

Cell 2455, Death Row
- Directed by: Fred F. Sears
- Screenplay by: Jack DeWitt
- Based on: Cell 2455, Death Row by Caryl Chessman
- Produced by: Wallace MacDonald
- Starring: William Campbell; Robert Campbell
- Cinematography: Fred Jackman Jr.
- Edited by: Henry Batista
- Music by: Mischa Bakaleinikoff (uncredited)
- Production company: Columbia Pictures
- Distributed by: Columbia Pictures
- Release date: April 19, 1955
- Running time: 77 minutes
- Country: United States
- Language: English

Cell 2455, Death Row is a 1955 American crime film noir directed by Fred F. Sears and starring William Campbell and Robert Wright Campbell. It is based on the 1954 book of the same name.

== Plot ==
A death row inmate uses his prison-law studies to fight for his life.

== Cast ==
- William Campbell as Whit Whittier
- R. Wright Campbell as Whit as a Boy (as Robert Campbell)
- Marian Carr as Doll
- Kathryn Grant as Jo-Anne
- Harvey Stephens as Prison Warden
- Vince Edwards as Hamiton
- Allen Nourse as Serl Whittier
- Diane DeLaire as Hallie Whittier
- Bart Braverman as Whit, as a Young Boy (as Bart Bradley)
- Paul Dubov as Al
- Tyler MacDuff as Nugent
- Buck Kartalian as Monk
- Eleanor Audley as Blanche
- Thom Carney as Hatcheck Charlie
- Joseph Forte as Lawyer (as Joe Forte)
- Howard Wright as Judge
- Kerwin Mathews as Reporter on Phone [uncredited]

== Production ==
Columbia Pictures acquired the rights to Caryl Chessman's book Cell 2455, Death Row: A Condemned Man's Own Story for $10,000 in June 1954. Columbia planned the film as a documentary-type story and did not intend that the film should advocate for Chessman's innocence.

== See also ==
- List of American films of 1955
