= Harley O. Teets =

Harley Oliver Teets (14 November 1906 in Terra Alta, Preston County, West Virginia – 1 September 1957 in Marin, California) was the warden of San Quentin State Prison from 1951 until his death in 1957. During that time he presided over executions performed in San Quentin's notorious gas chamber. Teets is probably best known for seizing the manuscript of one of condemned prisoner Caryl Chessman's books, arguing that since it was written on death row, it constituted "prison labor".

== Career ==
Teets began his career in correctional service as a guard in various federal penitentiaries. He reached the level of lieutenant before being hired as a captain at California's Folsom State Prison in the 1940s. He became associate warden under Clinton Duffy at San Quentin State Prison, and succeeded Duffy as warden in late 1951. Teets remained warden until his sudden death from coronary thrombosis in 1957.

In the 1930s, San Quentin had a reputation as a violent and corrupt institution. Duffy had done much to reform San Quentin during his tenure as warden. An investigation of alleged brutality during Teets' tenure was prompted by a series of articles in the San Francisco Chronicle written by a young Pierre Salinger.

Under Teets, a 1953 contest, open to all inmates, resulted in artist and inmate Alfredo Santos painting four giant murals on interior walls of San Quentin's South Block.

Teets was known to be compassionate toward condemned prisoners, often sitting with them prior to their executions in San Quentin's gas chamber.

== References in popular culture ==
- Teets is acknowledged in the title credits of House of Numbers, a 1957 film noir shot at San Quentin.
- In the 1977 movie Kill Me If You Can, about the trial and execution of Caryl Chessman, Teets is played by character actor Edward Mallory.
