= William Bast =

American screenwriter and author (1931–2015)

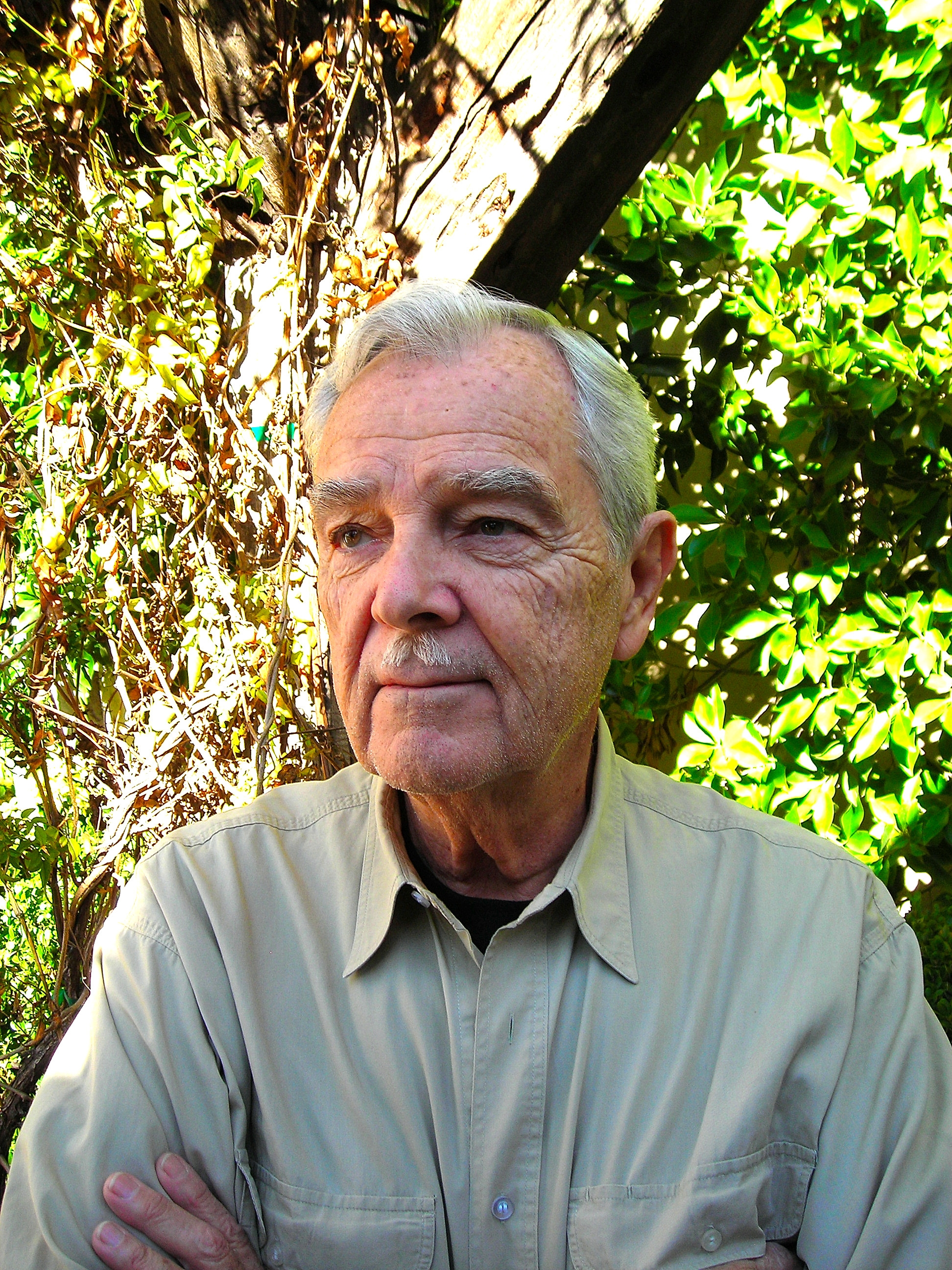
- Bast in 2008
- Born: April 3, 1931; Wauwatosa, Wisconsin, U.S.
- Died: May 4, 2015 (aged 84); Los Angeles, California, U.S.
- Education: Wauwatosa High School; University of Wisconsin; UCLA
- Occupations: Author, screenwriter
- Partner: Paul Huson
- Website: members.authorsguild.net/williambast/

William Bast (April 3, 1931 – May 4, 2015) was an American screenwriter and author. In addition to writing scripts for motion pictures and television, he was the author of two biographies of the screen actor James Dean. He often worked with his partner, Paul Huson.

== Early life ==
Bast was born in Wauwatosa, Wisconsin, the son of Gilbert Bast and Bernice Fleischmann. He began his early education in Milwaukee, transferring to Kenosha when his family moved there. Moving back to Milwaukee, he graduated from Wauwatosa High school, then enrolled at the University of Wisconsin.

When his family moved to Los Angeles, he transferred to UCLA, where he majored in Theater Arts, rooming with a fellow Theater Arts student from Indiana named James Dean who would later on become an actor. The two became close friends and Dean nicknamed Bast "Willie". In 1952 he moved to New York to join Dean and pursue a career in radio and television. There, he initially worked in press relations at CBS and subsequently, in 1953, wrote his first scripts for the NBC television sitcom The Aldrich Family.

== Writing about James Dean ==
After the death of Dean in an automobile accident in September 1955, Bast chronicled his five-year relationship with the actor in James Dean: a Biography. After moving to London, Bast wrote The Myth Makers for Granada Television, a fictionalized drama inspired by Dean's funeral, which Bast perceived as grotesque and publicity-driven, with a shattering effect on Dean's rural-American family and his hometown of Fairmount, Indiana. In the United States, the script was produced again by NBC's Dupont Show of the Month and aired under the title The Movie Star.

In 1975, Bast produced and scripted James Dean: Portrait of a Friend for NBC, a movie for television based upon his first biography of James Dean. In 2006, Barricade Books (USA) published Surviving James Dean, a second, more candid book by Bast about his relationship with Dean, which featured material that Bast did not include in his earlier account due to personal trepidations and social mores of the 1950s. In Surviving James Dean, Bast describes Dean in a compassionate light; how they met at UCLA, shared an apartment in Santa Monica and had a sexual relationship. He also describes the events that happened to him after Dean's death, largely as a result of having written his first book.

== Television work ==
In the late 1950s, Bast adapted Jean Giraudoux's play Tiger at the Gates for Granada Television, and wrote scripts for the BBC and ITV. Back in the States he wrote episodes for Combat!, Perry Mason, Ben Casey, The Outer Limits, Alfred Hitchcock Presents, Honey West, and Dr. Kildare, among other series.

In 1976, he received the Mystery Writers of America's Edgar Allan Poe Award for his television movie The Legend of Lizzie Borden with Elizabeth Montgomery in the title role. In 1977, his adaptation of Alexandre Dumas, père's The Man in the Iron Mask, starring Richard Chamberlain in a dual role, received two Emmy nominations for Bast's script and Olga Lehmann's costume designs. His script for The Scarlet Pimpernel with Anthony Andrews and Sir Ian McKellen was honored with a Christopher Award in 1982, and his The First Modern Olympics won the Writers Guild of America Outstanding Script for Television Longform Series for 1984.

From 1985 through 1987 Bast wrote and produced The Colbys, a spin-off from the popular series Dynasty, with his partner, Paul Huson; The Colbys won the 1986 People's Choice Award. He also collaborated with Huson, writing and producing a variety of television movies and series, including Tucker's Witch, The Hamptons, Pursuit, The Big One: The Great Los Angeles Earthquake, Deadly Invasion: The Killer Bee Nightmare, Power and Beauty, and The Fury Within.

Bast's motion picture credits include the script for Ray Harryhausen's The Valley of Gwangi, Hammerhead, and an adaptation of Harold Robbins' The Betsy. He died on May 4, 2015, at the age of 84; he had Alzheimer's disease.

== Bibliography ==
- — (1956). James Dean: a Biography. New York: Ballantine Books.
- — (2006). Surviving James Dean. New York: Barricade Books. ISBN 1-56980-298-X.
