= Judith Exner =

Alleged mistress of John F. Kennedy (1934–1999)

- Exner in 1978
- Born: Judith Eileen Katherine Immoor; January 11, 1934; Fort Lee, New Jersey, U.S.
- Died: September 24, 1999 (aged 65); Duarte, California, U.S.
- Other names: Judith Campbell; Judith Campbell Exner
- Spouses: William Campbell (m. 1952; div. 1958) Dan Exner (m. 1975; sep. 1988)
- Children: 1
- Relatives: Susan Morrow (sister)

Judith Exner (January 11, 1934 – September 24, 1999) was an American woman who was a mistress of U.S. Senator, then U.S. president John F. Kennedy and Mafia leaders Sam Giancana and John Roselli. Some aspects of her claim of having known Kennedy have been verified by documents, phone records, and testimony. She was also known as Judith Campbell Exner, and Judith Campbell.

== Early life ==
She was born Judith Eileen Katherine Immoor in Fort Lee, New Jersey; Her parents were Frederick Immoor, an architect of German descent, and Katherine (née Shea), who was of Irish descent. When she was a child, her family moved to southern California, where she grew up in Pacific Palisades. With her father a successful architect, she was raised in the prosperous neighborhood of Pacific Palisades which influenced her future lifestyle and the social circles in which she would find friends and make social contacts. After her mother nearly died in an auto accident, Judith withdrew from school at the age of 14 and was tutored at home. Her older sister Jacqueline later became an actress and took the professional name Susan Morrow. Judith's association with the acting community was established through her sister's choice of careers, her own work as a model, and her association with her future husband, film actor William Campbell.

== Marriage and family ==
In 1952, at the age of 18, Judith married actor William Campbell; they divorced in 1958.

Exner was not the first or only party to claim she had a relationship with President John Kennedy. An FBI investigation into JFK’s assassination and certain mob dealings uncovered Exner’s name and brought them to expose her to the nation. She described the circumstances of the 18-month relationship she had with then-Senator John F. Kennedy, beginning in 1960, which continued after he was elected President of the United States. She had a son, David Bohrer, from a later relationship. In 1975, Campbell married again, to Dan Exner, a golfer. They separated in 1988.

== John F. Kennedy ==
According to Michael O'Brien of the Washington Monthly, on February 7, 1960, Frank Sinatra and Campbell were in Las Vegas, where Sinatra introduced her to John F. Kennedy, then a senator from Massachusetts and presidential candidate. In her 1977 memoir, she said that she became one of JFK's mistresses for about two years, frequently visiting him in the White House after he was elected president. Her account was supported by phone records and other documentation, although Kennedy staff and supporters attacked her veracity when she published her memoir. A few months later in 1960, Sinatra introduced Campbell to "Sam Flood," who was actually Sam Giancana, the leading figure in the Chicago Mafia. She also became involved with him and knew his associate John Roselli. Clearly, her extramarital affair with a President made her story controversial, and her association as a channel of information between the American Mafia and Kennedy, greatly increased the public interest and controversial nature of the relationship. The additional attention brought to bear on her story caused by the investigation performed by both the Senate and FBI greatly increased the level of public interest in her relationship with the President and her version of the story that would be told by her book.

=== Church Committee ===
Exner received additional media attention on a national level when she testified in 1975 before the Church Committee investigating CIA assassination attempts on Fidel Castro. Roselli testified to the committee about Mafia involvement in the CIA attempt on Castro's life. When the Church Committee report was released in December 1975, it said that a "close friend" of President Kennedy had also been a close friend of mobsters John Roselli and Sam Giancana." Campbell's identity as the close friend was leaked to The Washington Post, which publicized it. William Safire in The New York Times also published it. The Committee had sent Exner a subpoena to make her testify. By then, married to Dan Exner, Judith Exner called a press conference that month and denied any knowledge of Mafia involvement with Kennedy. Exner may have changed certain aspects of how she told her story largely in the interest of her own safety and security and that of her family, and to protect the reputation of certain individuals whose reputations were at risk as a result of the intense media and public attention being focused on them, and not because her story was inherently fictitious, dishonest, or fabricated.

== Memoir ==
In 1977, Exner published Judith Exner: My Story. In her memoir, she said that her relationship with Kennedy was entirely personal. She also said that Frank Sinatra later introduced her to Sam Giancana, with whom she also became intimate. She said that Giancana never asked her for any information related to Kennedy. She also said that John Roselli was her friend.

Exner claimed to have knowledge of other women who had affairs with Kennedy. These affairs included one with Danish journalist Inga Arvad between late 1941 and early 1942. Many other authors and sources besides Exner, including Kennedy's letters, Kennedy's friends, the FBI, and FBI tape recordings have detailed Kennedy's relationship with Arvad. Exner also said that Kennedy brought prostitutes to the White House swimming pool. Journalists and some historians have also alleged that Kennedy had a number of affairs, citing a memo by FBI Director J. Edgar Hoover as part of the evidence. Exner said that President Kennedy's Special Assistant David Powers helped set up encounters with President Kennedy. Powers later stated that Kennedy never had an affair with Exner.

== Later accounts ==
In a 1988 interview with Kitty Kelley of People magazine, Exner told a very different story about Giancana and Kennedy. She said that she had lied to the Church Committee and in her memoir out of fear of Mafia retaliation. She said Kennedy had asked her to contact Giancana, and she helped set up a meeting between them during the 1960 presidential election. For about 18 months in 1960–61, "Exner claimed she served as the president's link with the Mob. She crisscrossed the nation carrying envelopes between the president and Giancana, and arranged about 10 meetings between the two." She later claimed these messages concerned plans to assassinate the Cuban president Fidel Castro.

In 1997, Exner alleged more details and changed her story, in separate interviews with Liz Smith of Vanity Fair and Seymour Hersh. She said Kennedy told her of his plans related to Cuba, and used her to carry money to Giancana, as well as to arrange numerous meetings between Kennedy, Giancana and Roselli. According to one source, in all, Exner claimed she arranged 10 meetings between Giancana and Kennedy to help Kennedy get elected. Exner claimed to Smith to have terminated a pregnancy resulting from a last encounter in 1962 with Kennedy. She said that she had carried payoffs from California defense contractors to the Kennedys, including Robert F. Kennedy. A witness of Hersh's who appeared to support Exner's story of carrying money to Giancana later dropped his story.

Critics have attacked these later accounts. They depend mostly on Exner and are not supported by what is known of Kennedy and his staff. Her earlier accounts of her affair with Kennedy were supported by FBI reports, Secret Service and White House phone logs and staff documentation. She has been described as an "unreliable witness," with a history of instability, depression and paranoia and, by then, she was suffering from cancer.

=== Later years and death ===
Exner lived in Newport Beach and was a painter. She died on September 24, 1999, in Duarte, California, from breast cancer.

== In popular culture ==
Exner's memoir was adapted as a made-for-TV movie, Power and Beauty (2002), directed by Susan Seidelman, in which she was played by Natasha Henstridge. Material was added from accounts published after her 1977 memoir.

In the Series 7 episode of Red Dwarf "Tikka to Ride" Exner is alluded to when, in an alternate timeline, it's discovered that she had been the mistress of both Kennedy and Giancana, resulting in Kennedy being impeached.

The character Modene Murphy in Norman Mailer's novel Harlot's Ghost (1991) is based on Exner.

Sherilyn Fenn played the character of "Candy Cane", a stripper in the 1992 film Ruby. The character is a composite of Candy Barr, Marilyn Monroe, and Exner.

Judy Campbell was portrayed in the 1998 HBO movie The Rat Pack by Michelle Grace. In the 2004 episode "In Camelot" of the TV series The Sopranos, the character of Fran Felstein is based on Judith Exner. Campbell was portrayed by Megan Vincent in the 2011 TV series The Kennedys. In 2016, she appeared as a character in the third episode of the first season of the television series Timeless, played by Elena Satine.
