= Anna and the King of Siam =

Anna and the King of Siam may refer to:

- Anna and the King of Siam (novel), a 1944 novel by Margaret Landon
- Anna and the King of Siam (film), a 1946 film starring Irene Dunne and Rex Harrison
- Anna and the King (TV series), a 1972 American sitcom
- Anna and the King, a 1999 film starring Jodie Foster and Chow Yun-Fat

== See also ==
- The King and I (disambiguation)
