= Leonowens =

Leonowens is a surname. Notable people with the surname include:

- Anna Leonowens (1834–1915), Indian-British travel writer, educator, and social activist
- Louis T. Leonowens (1856–1919), Siamese cavalry officer and trader, son of Anna
