= Anna and the King of Siam (film) =

1946 drama film directed by John Cromwell

- Original U.S. Poster
- Directed by: John Cromwell
- Screenplay by: Talbot Jennings; Sally Benson
- Based on: Anna and the King of Siam; 1944 novel by Margaret Landon
- Produced by: Louis D. Lighton
- Starring: Irene Dunne; Rex Harrison; Linda Darnell
- Cinematography: Arthur C. Miller
- Edited by: Harmon Jones
- Music by: Bernard Herrmann
- Production company: Twentieth Century Fox
- Distributed by: Twentieth Century Fox
- Release date: June 20, 1946 (U.S. release)
- Running time: 128 minutes
- Language: English
- Box office: $3.5 million (US rentals)

Anna and the King of Siam is a 1946 American drama film directed by John Cromwell. An adaptation of the 1944 novel of the same name by Margaret Landon, it was based on the fictionalized diaries of Anna Leonowens, an Anglo-Indian woman who claimed to be British and became governess in the Royal Court of Siam (now modern Thailand) during the 1860s. Darryl F. Zanuck read Landon's book in galleys and immediately bought the film rights.

The story mainly concerns the culture clash of the Imperialist Victorian values of the British Empire with the autocratic rule of Siam's King Mongkut. The successful film starred Rex Harrison as the king and Irene Dunne as Anna. At the 19th Academy Awards ceremony, the film received two Oscars; for Best Cinematography and Best Art Direction (Lyle R. Wheeler, William S. Darling, Thomas Little, Frank E. Hughes). Also nominated were Bernard Herrmann for the score, the screenwriters and supporting actress Gale Sondergaard.

Landon's novel was later adapted by Rodgers and Hammerstein for their 1951 stage musical The King and I and subsequent 1956 film of the same name. American film director Andy Tennant remade the film in 1999 as Anna and the King with Jodie Foster and Chow Yun-fat.

The portrayal of Tuptim in Anna and the King of Siam is considerably less sympathetic than in the musical version The King and I, as the 1946 film shows animosity between Tuptim and Anna, while the musical makes her into a romantic character. Also, Tuptim is ultimately executed cruelly by the king, following an episode in Leonowens's book, while in the musical her fate is made ambiguous.

== Plot ==
In 1862, Anna Owens arrives in Bangkok with her son Louis to tutor the children of the King. Her letter from the King asking her to come to Siam includes a promise that she will have a house of her own away from the Palace, but the Kralahome (Prime Minister) says she will have to stay in the harem for now.

Anna goes to the Kralahome's office the next day and asks him to introduce her to the King so she can get the house business straightened out and start her school. When she meets the King, he tells her it is polite to prostrate oneself before him; Anna says she will bow as she would to her own Queen. Mongkut introduces her to his many wives and his 67 children and insists she live in the palace, where she will be more accessible. When she insists, she is shown a sleazy house in the fish market, but rejects it and stays in the palace, starting her school there. He finally cedes to Anna on the matter of the house.

Mongkut begins summoning Anna in the middle of the night to discuss the Bible and other scholarly matters. On the way back from one of these sessions, she discovers a chained slave with a baby. This is L'Ore, who belongs to Lady Tuptim, the King's newest wife. Tuptim refuses to let L'Ore go, even though L'Ore's husband has offered to pay for her. Anna reminds the King that his own law requires that slaves must be freed if the money is offered. Tuptim runs away.

Mongkut expects English visitors and asks Anna to dress some of his prettiest wives in European style and to provide English-style decor and utensils to show that he is not a barbarian. Anna suggests that the King invite consuls to come from other countries at the same time. The party is a great success, combining British, European, and Siamese traditions and convincing the visitors that Siam is a civilized nation with a proud history.

Lady Tuptim is found in a Buddhist temple, disguised as a young man. At trial, she explains she couldn't stand being shut up, and so disguised herself and went to the monastery, where she was accepted as a novice and studied with Phra Palat, her former fiancé, who took holy vows when Tuptim was presented to the king. No one believes her story. Anna begs the King's help, but he is insulted that she even knows about such a private matter. Anna loses her temper and tells the king he has no heart. Phra Palat and Tuptim are both burned at the stake.

Anna decides that she has had enough and says goodbye to the children. The royal wives read her a letter pleading with her to stay. Lady Thiang says that the crown prince may not grow up to be a good king if Anna doesn't stay to educate him. At the same time, Louis dies in a riding accident. When the King asks Anna to continue secretarial duties, she says, "It's the children I want," and goes on with her school.

Many years later, Anna is summoned to the bedside of the dying King. The King says that Anna spoke the truth to him and was a good influence on the children. He expresses his gratitude and dies. The Kralahome asks Anna to stay and help the prince. When Chulalongkorn is crowned, his first act is to abolish the practice of prostration before the King so that everyone can respect each other and work together.

== Cast ==
- Irene Dunne as Anna Owens
- Rex Harrison as King Mongkut
- Linda Darnell as Tuptim
- Lee J. Cobb as Kralahome
- Gale Sondergaard as Lady Thiang
- Mikhail Rasumny as Alak
- Dennis Hoey as Sir Edward
- Tito Renaldo as Prince Chulalongkorn (older)
- Richard Lyon as Louis Owens
- John Abbott as Phya Phrom (uncredited)
- Marjorie Eaton as Miss MacFarlane (uncredited)
- William Edmunds as Moonshee (uncredited)
- Connie Leon as Beebe (uncredited)
- Dimples Cooper as a wife of the King (uncredited)

== Historical inconsistencies ==
There are a number of differences between the plot of this film and historical fact, including:

- Anna was Anglo-Indian, raised in India, and not Welsh, as she claimed; she had never even visited Britain before becoming a governess in the court of Siam. Also, she was the widow of a civilian clerk and hotel-keeper, not a British army officer.
- King Mongkut had been a Buddhist monk for 27 years before succeeding his brother as king. This is actually brought out quite prominently in one scene. His portrayal as an arrogant tyrant is debated. The film and musical production were based on Margaret Landon's 1944 novel, Anna and the King of Siam, which was in turn based on Leonowens' accounts of her experiences. To set the record straight, Thai intellectuals Seni Pramoj and Kukrit Pramoj (brothers) wrote The King of Siam Speaks in 1948. (ISBN 9789748298122)
- Tuptim's torture and execution by burning at the stake is disputed by a great-granddaughter of the King who claimed also to be Tuptim's granddaughter. This type of execution was never done in Siam according to former Prime Minister Anand Panyarachun.
- Mongkut really did write a letter to Washington offering elephants to be used as stock for breeding American elephants, but the offer was unrelated to the Civil War. His letter, accompanied by some gifts, was addressed to President James Buchanan during the last month of his term, "or to whomsoever the people have elected anew as Chief ruler in place of President Buchanan". The response, dated almost a year later, came from President Abraham Lincoln, thanking the king for the gifts and good wishes, but declining the elephants on the grounds that the latitude of the U.S. made raising elephants impractical.
- Anna's son Louis dies as a child in a riding accident in the film. The historical Louis Leonowens did not die as a child, and even outlived his mother.
- In the film, Anna is present at the death of King Mongkut. The historical Anna had been granted a leave of absence for health reasons in 1867 and was in Britain at the time of the King's death in 1868; she was not invited to resume her post by the new king.

== See also ==
- Portrayal of East Asians in American film and theater
