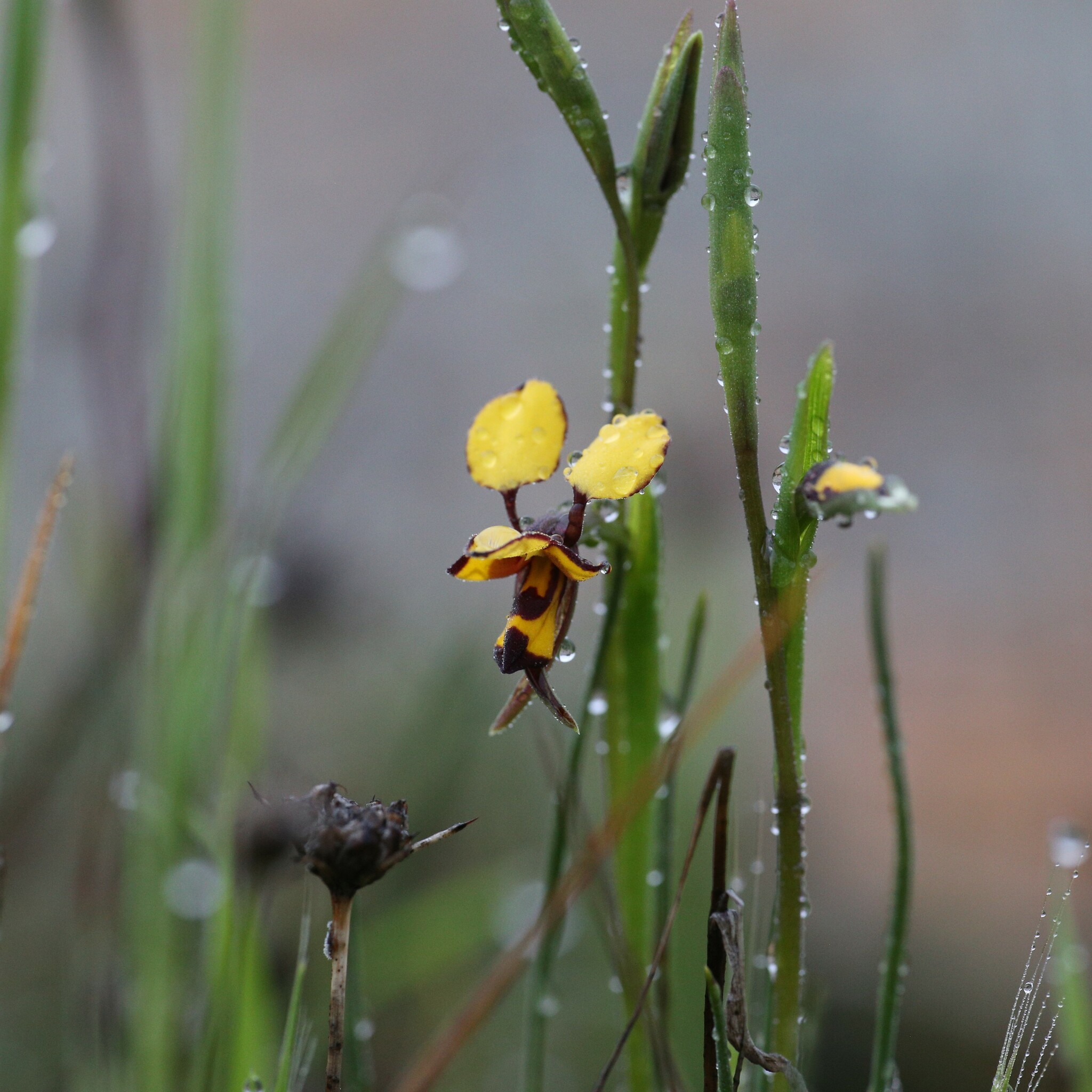

Scientific classification
- Kingdom: Plantae
- Clade: Tracheophytes
- Clade: Angiosperms
- Clade: Monocots
- Order: Asparagales
- Family: Orchidaceae
- Subfamily: Orchidoideae
- Tribe: Diurideae
- Genus: Diuris
- Species: D. segregata

Binomial name
- Diuris segregata D.L.Jones & C.J.French

= Diuris segregata =

Northampton bee orchid

Species of orchid

Diuris segregata, commonly known as Northampton bee orchid, is a species of orchid that is endemic to the south-west of Western Australia. It has between two and six narrowly linear to thread-like leaves and up to three yellow flowers, usually with dark red markings.

== Description ==
Diuris segregata is a tuberous, perennial herb with between two and six narrowly linear to thread-like leaves 60–150 mm (2.4–5.9 in) long and 1.0–1.5 mm (0.039–0.059 in) wide. Up to three yellow flowers, usually with dark red markings, 10–15 mm (0.39–0.59 in) long and 9–11 mm (0.35–0.43 in) wide are borne on a flowering stem 100–200 mm (3.9–7.9 in) tall. The dorsal sepal is narrowly egg-shaped to narrowly elliptic, 7–10 mm (0.28–0.39 in) long and 3.5–5.5 mm (0.14–0.22 in) wide. The lateral sepals are parallel or crossed near the tip, 8–13 mm (0.31–0.51 in) long, 1–3 mm (0.039–0.118 in) wide. The petals are paddle-shaped, the blade elliptic to egg-shaped or more or less round, 6–9 mm (0.24–0.35 in) long and 4–8 mm (0.16–0.31 in) wide on a reddish-brown stalk 3–5 mm (0.12–0.20 in) long. The labellum is 7–11 mm (0.28–0.43 in) long with three lobes - the centre lobe broadly wedge-shaped, 6.0–8.5 mm (0.24–0.33 in) long and wide. The side lobes are spread widely apart and are oblong, 6.0–8.5 mm (0.24–0.33 in) long and wide. There are two smooth calli ridges outlined with red near the base of the labellum. Flowering occurs in early August and September.

== Taxonomy and naming ==
Diuris segregata was first formally described in 2013 by David Jones and Christopher J. French in Australian Orchid Review, from a specimen collected by French near Yallabatharra in 2004. The specific epithet (segregata) means "separate", or "set apart", referring to its differences from D. septentrionalis, that grows in a similar area.

== Distribution and habitat ==
Northampton bee orchid grows in winter-wet areas, near the edges of temporary lakes and around rocks between Eneabba and Kalbarri in the Avon Wheatbelt, Geraldton Sandplains and Swan Coastal Plain bioregions of south-western Western Australia.

== Conservation status ==
Diuris segragata is listed as "not threatened" by the Western Australian Government Department of Biodiversity, Conservation and Attractions.
