= The King and I (disambiguation) =

The King and I is a 1951 musical by Rodgers and Hammerstein.

The King and I may also refer to:

== Film and TV ==
- The King and I (1956 film), an adaptation starring Deborah Kerr and Yul Brynner
- The King and I (1999 film), an animated film adaptation of the musical
- The King and I (TV series), a South Korean television series
- "The King and I", an episode of Reba

== Music ==
=== Film soundtrack albums ===
- The King and I (1956 film soundtrack), a soundtrack to the film starring Deborah Kerr and Yul Brynner
- The King and I (1999 film soundtrack), a soundtrack to the animated film

=== Original cast albums ===
- The King and I (original cast recording), with Gertrude Lawrence and Yul Brynner, 1951
- The King and I (1953 London cast album), with Valerie Hobson and Herbert Lom, 1953
- The King and I (1964 studio cast album), with Barbara Cook and Theodore Bikel, 1964
- The King and I (Lincoln Center cast album), with Risë Stevens and Darren McGavin, 1965
- The King and I (1977 Broadway cast album), with Constance Towers and Yul Brynner, 1977
- The King and I (1992 studio cast album), starring Julie Andrews and Ben Kingsley
- The King and I (1996 Broadway cast album), with Donna Murphy and Lou Diamond Phillips
- The King and I (1964 studio cast album), with Valerie Masterson and Christopher Lee
- The King and I (2000 London cast album), with Elaine Paige and Jason Scott Lee
- The King and I (2015 Broadway cast album), with Kelli O'Hara and Ken Watanabe

=== Non-cast albums ===
- Selections from The King and I, non-cast album by Patrice Munsel & Robert Merrill, 1951
- The King and I (The Mastersounds album), jazz rendition of the musical score by The Mastersounds, 1957

=== Other albums ===
- The King & I (Faith Evans and The Notorious B.I.G. album), an album by Faith Evans and Notorious B.I.G., 2017
- The King & Eye, an album by The Residents, 1989

=== Songs ===
- "The King and I" (song), by Eminem featuring CeeLo Green, 2022

== See also ==
- Anna and the King of Siam (disambiguation)
