= List of State Register of Heritage Places in the Shire of Northampton =

The State Register of Heritage Places is maintained by the Heritage Council of Western Australia. As of 2026, 223 places are heritage-listed in the Shire of Northampton, of which 30 are on the State Register of Heritage Places.

== List ==
The Western Australian State Register of Heritage Places, as of 2026, lists the following 30 state registered places within the Shire of Northampton:

Place name	Place #	Location	Suburb or town	Co-ordinates	Built	State registered	Notes	Photo
Warribanno Smelter Complex Ruin	1900	Warribanno Chimney Road	Ajana	27.883883°S 114.632875°E	1849	13 December 1996	Also referred to as Warribanno Chimney	
Church & Cemetery, Gwalla	1902	Gwalla Street	Northampton	28.358503°S 114.637721°E	1861	27 December 2002		
Convent of the Sacred Heart (former)	1903	51 Hampton Road	Northampton	28.350801°S 114.630590°E	1919	26 February 1999	Also referred to as Nagle Centre	
Church of Our Lady in Ara Coeli	1904	49-51 Hampton Street	Northampton	28.350350°S 114.630625°E	1936	28 February 1995	Also referred to as St Mary's	
Northampton Police Station, Quarters & Court House (former)	1906	202 Hampton Road	Northampton	28.351757°S 114.630590°E	1884	30 October 1998		
Northampton Roads Board Building (former)	1907	53 Hampton Road	Northampton	28.351540°S 114.630335°E	1898	9 September 2003	Also referred to as Public Library	
Holy Trinity Anglican Church, Northampton	1909	193 Hampton Road	Northampton	28.352923°S 114.629241°E	1908	15 August 2003		
Northampton Railway Station Precinct	1911	67 & 69 Mary Street	Northampton	28.349708°S 114.635579°E	1912	15 January 2013		
Chiverton House Complex	1912	166 Hampton Road	Northampton	28.355658°S 114.630089°E	1865	11 August 1995		
Alma School (former)	1913	Rob Road	Alma	28.274003°S 114.618386°E	1914	11 August 1995	Also referred to as Alma School Building	
Willow Gully	1914	1512 Horrocks Road	Sandy Gully	28.394461°S 114.486846°E	1860	28 June 1996	Also referred to as Willi Gulli and Willow Gully Homestead and Outbuildings	
Lynton Convict Hiring Depot (Ruins)	1915	Henderson Terrace, off Port Gregory Road	Yallabatharra	28.209852°S 114.310837°E	1853	2 June 1995	Also referred to as Port Gregory Hiring Station/Depot and Sanford House	
The Bowes	3270	1950 Nabawa East	East Bowes	28.382962°S 114.674759°E	1850	6 September 1996	Also referred to as Chilimony Bowes and Knockbrack	
Oakabella	3271	423 Starling Road	Bowes	28.500354°S 114.597910°E	1860	28 June 1996		
Geraldine Lead Mine Site	3455	off Warribanno Chimney Road	Ajana	27.843008°S 114.638477°E	1849	4 August 1998	Also referred to as Geraldine Mine Site, Buildings and Graveyard	
Lynton Barns & Stables	3947	Henderson Terrace	Yallabatharra	28.209852°S 114.310837°E			Part of Lynton Convict Hiring Depot (Ruins) Precinct (1915)	
Wanerenooka Mine Site	4658	Hampton Road	Northampton	28.339349°S 114.630591°E	1855	1 April 1999	Also referred to as Wannerenooka	
Northampton State Battery	5114	Horrocks Road	Northampton	28.356000°S 114.615109°E	1954	2 June 1998		
Lime Kiln & Quarry - Site of	8918	Grey Road, Lynton	Yallabatharra	28.209852°S 114.310837°E			Part of Lynton Convict Hiring Depot (Ruins) Precinct (1915)	
Brookside, Hillview & Surrounds	8922	Ivans Road	Northampton	28.341081°S 114.577671°E	1877	25 June 2004	Also referred to as Rosser's	
Baddera Mines	8924	Off Baddera Road	Alma	28.273086°S 114.637626°E	1906	27 December 2002	Also referred to as Baddera Mine, Old Baddera, North Baddera Mine, New Baddera and Extended	
Hill View	8927	Wundi Road	Northampton	28.282339°S 114.646821°E			Part of the Brookside, Hillview & Surrounds Precinct (8922)	
Gwalla Cemetery	17786	Gwalla Street	Northampton	28.358503°S 114.637721°E	1863		Part of Church & Cemetery, Gwalla Precinct (1902)	
Hillview	17788	Port Gregory Road	Northampton	28.334627°S 114.578653°E			Also referred to as Rosser's; Part of the Brookside, Hillview & Surrounds Precinct (8922)	
Kilally	17825	Warribanno Chimney Road	Northampton	27.843008°S 114.638477°E			Part of Geraldine Lead Mine Site (3455)	
Sanford's House	17826	Port Gregory Road	Yallabatharra	28.209510°S 114.305549°E			Part of Lynton Convict Hiring Depot (Ruins) Precinct (1915)	
Northampton Railway Station and Rest Room	17859		Northampton	28.349708°S 114.635579°E			Also referred to as Mary Street Station; Part of Northampton Railway Station Precinct (1911)	
Old Wheat bin/ weighbridge site and railway turntable	17861	Robinson Street	Northampton	28.349708°S 114.635579°E	1912		Part of Northampton Railway Station Precinct (1911	
Brookside	24876	Port Gregory Road	Northampton	28.341280°S 114.577752°E			Part of the Brookside, Hillview & Surrounds Precinct (8922)	
Station Master's House	17860	39 Mary Street	Northampton	28.349792°S 114.636002°E	1912		Part of Northampton Railway Station Precinct (1911	
