= Lynton Convict Hiring Depot =

Heritage site in Western Australia

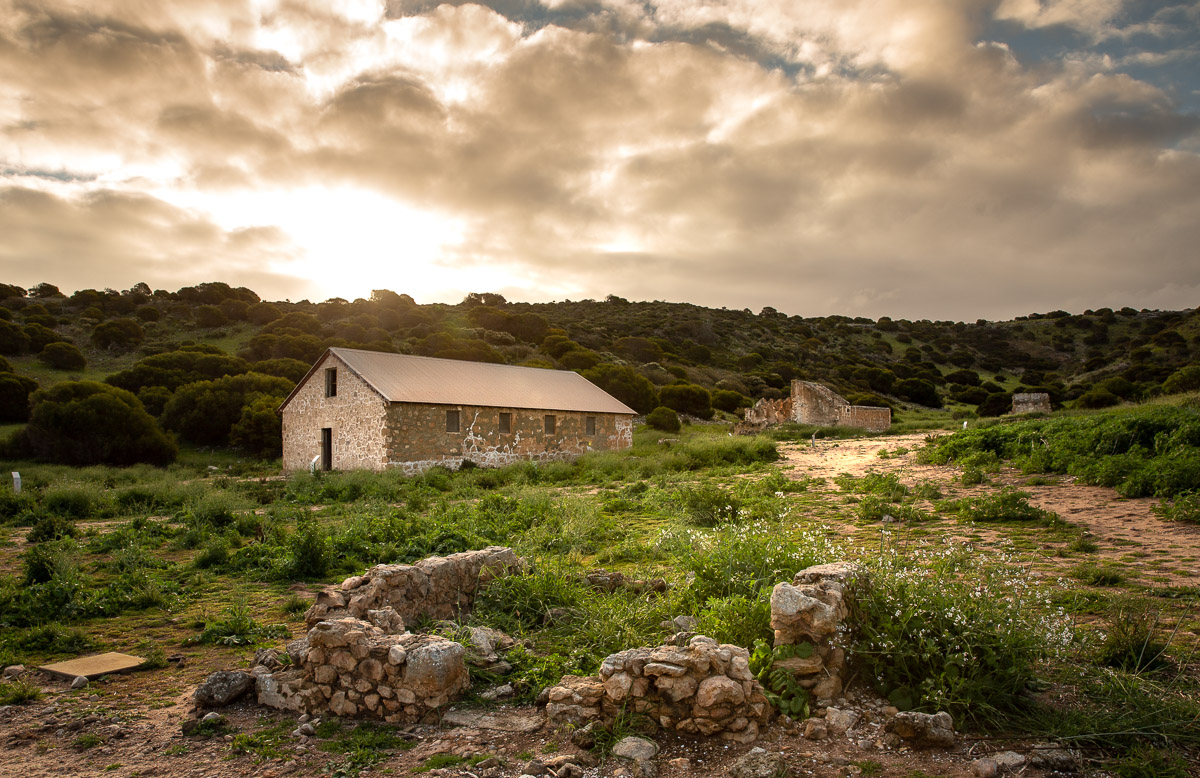
- Lynton Convict Hiring Depot ruins
- Interactive map of Lynton Convict Hiring Depot
- Location: Yallabatharra; 28°12′36″S 114°18′40″E
- Opened: 22 May 1853; 173 years ago
- Closed: 3 January 1857; 169 years ago

Western Australia Heritage Register
- Type: State Registered Place
- Designated: 02 Jun 1995
- Reference no.: 1915

Register of the National Estate
- Official name: Lynton Convict Hiring Depot
- Type: Historic
- Designated: 26 Mar 1985
- Reference no.: 9688
- Place File Number: 5/03/144/0005

The Lynton Convict Hiring Depot (1853–1857) was the first convict depot north of Fremantle, Western Australia. It was established on 22 May 1853 with the arrival of the 176-tonne (173-long-ton) brigantine Leander, which transferred 60 ticket-of-leave convicts and Pensioner Guards (retired British soldiers) that had arrived at Fremantle on Pyrenees on 1 May. It was established to supply labour to the Geraldine Lead Mine, 52 kilometres (32 mi) north-east of the site on the Murchison River, and to local settlers. The depot was closed by order of Governor Arthur Kennedy on 3 January 1857 due to the high cost to the government of its maintenance.

The staff of the depot included, for a time, Thomas Leonowens, the husband of Anna Leonowens who later became prominent as the author of a memoir regarding her career as a governess to the royal family of Siam (Thailand). The Leonowens' son, Louis was born at Lynton.

Five Irish immigrant women from what was called a bride ship are also known to have arrived in Western Australia at Lynton.

By 1856 a store, bakery, depot, lockup, hospital, lime kiln and administration block had all been built but a lack of fresh vegetables had seen the convict population ravaged by scurvy. It was decided to close the settlement and the convicts were transferred with the officer in charge to Champion Bay in 1857. The transfer seems to have been due to the growing importance of the town of Geraldton, and the need for public works in the district.

Lynton remains the most intact example of a regional convict depot in Western Australia. Entered on the Register of the national estate and vested in the Northampton Shire Council, conservation works are in progress via the Northampton Historical Society.

== See also ==
- Toodyay Convict Hiring Depot (1851)
- Toodyay Convict Hiring Depot (1852–1872)
