= Holy Trinity Anglican Church, Northampton =

Church in Western Australia

Holy Trinity Anglican Church
- Holy Trinity Anglican Church, Northampton
- Holy Trinity Anglican Church
- 28°21′10″S 114°37′45″E
- Location: Northampton, Western Australia
- Address: 193 Hampton Road, Northampton WA 6535
- Country: Australia
- Denomination: Anglican Church of Australia
- Churchmanship: Low church, Evangelical
- Website: Northampton Church

History
- Status: Church
- Founded: 1908
- Dedication: Holy Trinity

Architecture
- Functional status: Active
- Heritage designation: State Register of Heritage Places
- Designated: 15 August 2003
- Architect: Henry (Harry) Marwood
- Architectural type: Parish church
- Style: Federation Gothic, Gothic Revival
- Years built: 1908, 1959

Specifications
- Materials: Granite

Administration
- Province: Western Australia
- Diocese: North West Australia

Western Australia Heritage Register
- Official name: Holy Trinity Anglican Church
- Type: State Registered Place
- Criteria: 11.1., 11.2., 11.4., 12.2., 12.3, 12.4., 12.5.
- Designated: 15 August 2003
- Reference no.: 01909

The Holy Trinity Anglican Church is a heritage-listed Anglican church in Northampton, Western Australia. Completed in 1908, and further expanded in 1959, the church remains in active use and is part of the Anglican Diocese of North West Australia.

Northampton, one of the oldest towns in Western Australia, is classified as a 'historic town' by the National Trust of Australia (WA), with over 200 heritage listings in the shire, including 30 which are listed on the State Register. Holy Trinity Anglican Church was added to the State Register of Heritage Places on the 15th August, 2003.

== Description ==
Constructed of locally sourced granite, the church building serves as a 'fine example of a Federation Gothic Revival style church,' and has been deemed to be of exceptional significance to the town's heritage.

Plans for the construction of the church were passed by February of 1908, with construction beginning in April, and the majority of the work completed around September. It was licensed for use that same month, and then officially consecrated by Bishop Riley on the 18th of January, 1909.

The church remained part of the Diocese of Perth until 1928 when the boundaries between Perth and the North West were redrawn. Northampton (along with the territories of Greenough, Geraldton, and Mullewa) were given over to the North West diocese in an effort to provide them with a more stable base of operations.

== See also ==
- Anglican Diocese of North West Australia
- List of State Register of Heritage Places in the Shire of Northampton
