= Never Dies the Dream =

1949 novel by Margaret Landon

- Author: Margaret Landon
- Language: English
- Genre: Historical fiction
- Published: 1949
- Publisher: Doubleday
- Publication place: USA
- Pages: 309

Never Dies the Dream is a 1949 novel by Margaret Landon. The books centers around India Severn, an upright missionary assisting the waifs of Bangkok. She comes to the aid of an American widow of a Siamese prince.
