= Kenneth Landon =

American missionary, writer and academic specialist (1903–1993)

Kenneth Perry Landon (27 March 1903 Meadville, Pennsylvania – 26 August 1993 Arlington, Virginia) was a government and academic specialist on Thailand. He and his wife, Margaret Landon, were Presbyterian missionaries in southern Thailand from 1927 to 1937. At the start of America's participation in World War Two, he was called to Washington to become a State Department specialist on Thailand. After the war, he became an academic promoter of the study of Thailand.

== Early life and career ==
Landon was born in Meadville, Pennsylvania. He studied at Wheaton College and served as a Presbyterian missionary in Thailand from 1927 to 1937.

They returned, and he received a master's degree and doctorate in comparative religion from the University of Chicago. He taught philosophy and psychology at Earlham College, a Quaker institution. While at Earlham, he taught what was probably the first undergraduate course in Chinese philosophy and published several monographs, including Siam in Transition and The Chinese in Thailand, before joining a predecessor office of the Office of Strategic Services in Washington on the eve of World War Two, during which he also worked for the Board of Economic Warfare.

After the war, Landon served as associate dean of the School of Language and Area Studies at the Foreign Service Institute and was on the Operations Coordinating Board of the National Security Council. He then served as director of the Center for South and Southeast Asian Studies at American University until his retirement in 1974. He died of cancer in 1993.
