= Lynton, Western Australia =

Lynton
- Town
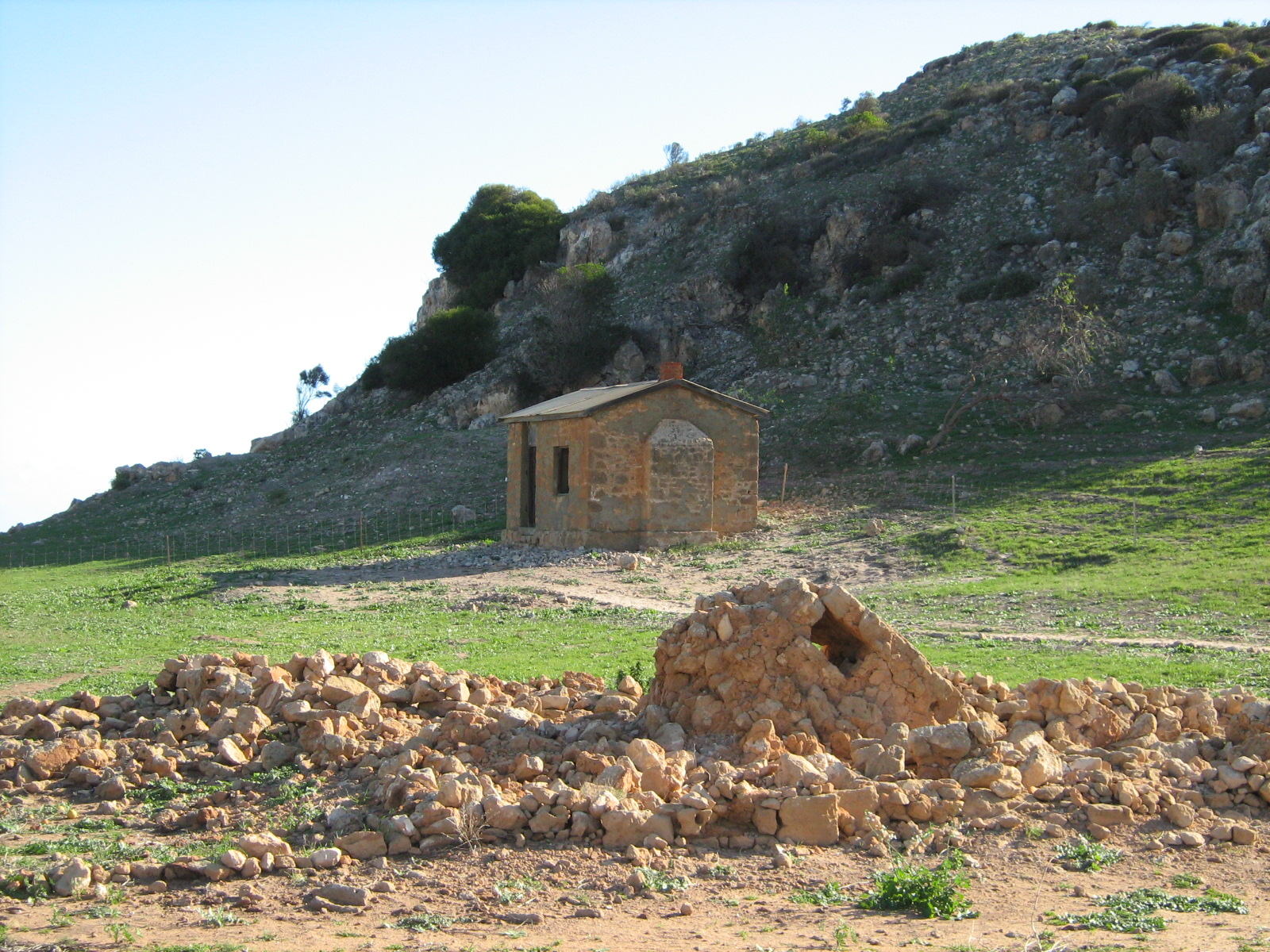
- Convict-built buildings at Lynton

- Interactive map of Lynton
- Coordinates: 28°13′S 114°19′E
- Country: Australia
- State: Western Australia
- LGA: Shire of Northampton
- Location: 40 km (25 mi) NW of Northampton
- Established: 1853

Government
  - State electorate: North West
  - Federal division: Durack

Population
  - Total: 79 (SAL 2021)
- Postcode: 6535

Lynton is a townsite in the Mid West region of Western Australia. It is part of a larger rural district known as Yallabatharra. Lynton is situated at the mouth of the Hutt River, 7.6 kilometres (4.7 miles) by road from Gregory – between the larger towns of Northampton and Kalbarri. During the 1850s, the area was the site of the Lynton Convict Hiring Depot.

== History ==
On 22 May 1853, the Port Gregory Convict Depot (known later as Lynton Convict Hiring Depot) was built to supply convict labour to the Geraldine Lead Mine, in the bed of the nearby Murchison River.

The supervisor of the depot, Captain H. A. Sanford, had a residence constructed in the area during 1853 and named it Lynton. The reason for Sandford's use of the name is unknown, although his parents reputedly had ties to an area by that name in Surrey. The name of Lynton was soon being applied to the broader area around the depot.

Anna Harriette Leonowens, who would become famous as the subject of Anna and the King of Siam (and various adaptations of it), lived in Lynton during the mid-1850s, while her husband, Thomas Leonowens, worked there for the Commissariat. Their son, Louis was born at Lynton in 1856.

The convict hiring depot was moved to Champion Bay (Geraldton) in 1857.

Lynton townsite was not officially gazetted until 1854. The adjoining townsite of Pakington (later renamed Gregory), was gazetted around the same time.
