= Anna and the King (TV series) =

CBS TV Series

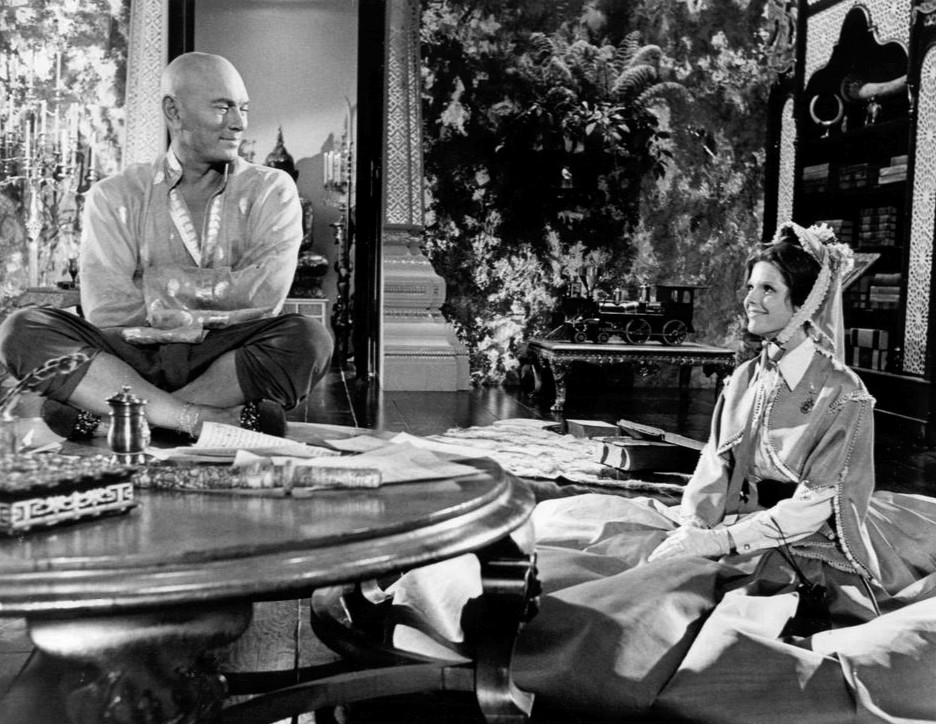
- Yul Brynner and Samantha Eggar, 1972.
- Genre: Sitcom
- Based on: The King and I by Rodgers and Hammerstein
- Directed by: Gerald Mayer; Lee Philips; William Wiard
- Starring: Yul Brynner; Samantha Eggar; Brian Tochi; Keye Luke
- Composers: Jerry Goldsmith; Richard Shores
- Country of origin: United States
- Original language: English
- No. of seasons: 1
- No. of episodes: 13

Production
- Executive producer: Gene Reynolds
- Producers: Bill Idelson; Harvey Miller
- Running time: 30 mins.
- Production company: 20th Century Fox Television

Original release
- Network: CBS
- Release: September 17 – December 31, 1972

Anna and the King is a television sitcom that aired Sunday nights at 7:30 pm (EST) on CBS as part of its 1972 fall lineup.

== Overview ==
Anna and the King is a non-musical adaptation of the film of Rodgers and Hammerstein's The King and I (1956), which was in turn based on the 1944 novel Anna and the King of Siam by Margaret Landon. Unlike the majority of attempts to turn hit films into television series, Anna and the King featured the original film's star, Yul Brynner, who was more identified with that role than any other.

The plot, like that of the musical, involved the king's bringing to Siam of a British governess, Anna Leonowens (portrayed here by Samantha Eggar), to educate his 12-year-old son and heir, Crown Prince Chulalongkorn (Brian Tochi). As time goes on, the two develop a platonic infatuation with each other, despite the low status of women in Siamese society, which appalls Anna, as does the king's related practice of polygamy. Also appearing regularly was a member of the royal household, Kralahome (Keye Luke).

While the musical, both film and stage versions, was a worldwide success (Brynner was still touring in the stage version until just before his death), this series was cancelled at midseason, due to low ratings and negative reviews. Also, no portion of the Rodgers and Hammerstein musical score could be used, due to licensing restrictions.

== Cast ==
- Yul Brynner as King Mongkut of Siam
- Samantha Eggar as Anna Leonowens
- Brian Tochi as Crown Prince Chulalongkorn
- Eric Shea as Louis Leonowens
- Keye Luke as Kralahome
- Lisa Lu as Lady Thiang
- Rosalind Chao as Princess Serena
- Ratna Assan as King Youngest Wife

== Episodes ==
No.	Title	Directed by	Written by	Original release date
1	"Pilot"	Gene Reynolds	Bill Idelson & Harvey Miller	September 17, 1972
2	"The Baby"	Michael O'Herlihy	Jim Fritzell	September 24, 1972
3	"The King or the Tiger?"	Michael Gordon	Jerry Mayer	October 1, 1972
4	"Chulalongkorn's Grades"	James Sheldon	Gene Thompson	October 8, 1972
5	"Anna's Romance"	William Wiard	Gene Thompson	October 15, 1972
6	"The Bicycle"	Jack Donohue & William Wiard	Maurice Richlin	October 22, 1972
7	"The Haunted Temple"	Lee Philips	Jerry Mayer	November 5, 1972
8	"Louis, the Pawn"	Hy Averback	Bud Freeman	November 12, 1972
9	"The Chimes"	E.W. Swackhamer	Jerry Mayer	November 19, 1972
10	"Serana"	Jeff Corey	Lester & Tina Pine	November 26, 1972
11	"The Marriage of Prince Chula"	William Wiard	Bill Idelson & Harvey Miller	December 10, 1972
12	"The King and the Egg"	Terry Becker	Austin Kalish & Irma Kalish	December 17, 1972
13	"Louis' Love"	Gerald Mayer	Jim Fritzell	December 31, 1972

== Unsuccessful lawsuit by Margaret Landon ==
Margaret Landon was unhappy with this series and charged the producers with "inaccurate and mutilated portrayals" of her literary property; she unsuccessfully sued for copyright infringement.

== Sources ==
- Brooks, Tim and Marsh, Earle, The Complete Directory to Prime Time Network and Cable TV Shows, Ballantine Books, p. 69.
