= Anna and the King =

1999 film by Andy Tennant

- Theatrical release poster
- Directed by: Andy Tennant
- Screenplay by: Steve Meerson; Peter Krikes
- Based on: Anna and the King of Siam by Margaret Landon
- Produced by: Lawrence Bender; Ed Elbert
- Starring: Jodie Foster; Chow Yun-fat; Bai Ling
- Cinematography: Caleb Deschanel
- Edited by: Roger Bondelli
- Music by: George Fenton
- Production companies: Fox 2000 Pictures; Lawrence Bender Productions
- Distributed by: 20th Century Fox
- Release date: December 17, 1999 (United States)
- Running time: 148 minutes
- Country: United States
- Language: English
- Budget: $92 million
- Box office: $114 million

Anna and the King is a 1999 American biographical period drama film directed by Andy Tennant. Steve Meerson and Peter Krikes loosely based their screenplay on the 1944 novel Anna and the King of Siam, which gives a fictionalized account of the diaries of Anna Leonowens. It stars Jodie Foster as Leonowens, an English school teacher in Siam during the late 19th century, who becomes the teacher of King Mongkut's (Chow Yun-fat) many children and wives. It was mostly shot in Malaysia, particularly in the Penang, Ipoh and Langkawi regions.

Anna and the King was released in the United States on December 17, 1999, by 20th Century Fox. The film was subject to controversy when the Thai government deemed it historically inaccurate and insulting to the royal family and banned its distribution in the country. It received mixed reviews from critics who praised the production values, costume design, and musical score but criticised its screenplay and length. The film grossed $114 million worldwide, against its $92 million budget. It received two nominations at the 72nd Academy Awards: Best Art Direction and Best Costume Design.

== Plot ==
Widowed British educator Anna Leonowens and her son Louis travel to Siam, where she is to teach English, Modern Western Education, Scientific and Secular Education to Crown Prince Chulalongkorn, the heir of King Mongkut. Believing modernizing Siam will see the country resist colonialism and protect its ancient traditions, Mongkut has Anna teach all of his dozens of children, born to twenty-three wives.

Initially, Mongkut and Anna clash due to cultural differences as well as their equally strong wills, yet he is impressed by her intelligence and benevolence. He soon sees the positive effects of her teaching methods, especially her determination to treat the princes and princesses as ordinary school children. Anna's abolitionist views also help to influence Chulalongkorn's views on slavery.

Mongkut and Anna discuss differences between Eastern and Western love, but he dismisses the notion that a man can be happy with only one wife. Anna grows closer to the royal children, particularly Princess Fa-Ying, who subsequently falls sick with cholera and dies. Mongkut later believes she has been reincarnated as one of her beloved palace monkeys.

Wanting to impress British ambassadors and their staffs, Mongkut appoints Anna to organize a grand reception for them. Sir Mycroft Kincaid, of the East India Company and the Europeans express their beliefs that Siam is a superstitious, backward nation, while Anna powerfully argues that this is not the case.

When Siam comes under siege from what appears to be a British-funded coup d'état against Mongkut, using Burmese soldiers, Mongkut sends his brother, Prince Chaofa, and military advisor General Alak to investigate. Alak, however, betrays the prince and poisons his own soldiers, revealing he is actually the coup's leader.

Anna also begins to educate Lady Tuptim, the King's newest concubine, who is in love with another man, Khun Phra Balat. Although Mongkut is kind to her, Tuptim yearns for her true love. Balat becomes a Buddhist monk and Tuptim disguises herself to escape the palace and join him in his monastery.

Tuptim is captured and put on trial, where she is told Balat has been tortured and she is ordered caned. Unable to bear the sight, Anna speaks out angrily in an attempt to stop the abuse, before she is forcibly removed from the court. Her outburst prevents Mongkut from showing clemency, because he cannot be seen as beholden to her, though he feels ashamed. Tuptim and Balat are beheaded publicly.

Anna resolves to leave Siam, as many other Europeans are due to the encroaching Burmese army. Wanting to protect his interest in Siam, Sir Mycroft approaches the Siamese prime minister and reveals details of a coup attempt in return for money. With Mongkut's army too far from the palace to engage the rebels, he creates a ruse of a sighting of the rare white elephant and leaves the palace with his wives and children to find it.

The prime minister convinces Anna to return and help Mongkut, who plans to hide his family in a monastery where he spent part of his life. En route, they are engaged by Alak's army and the group comes up with a plan: Anna, Louis and the wives and children use a horn and fireworks to make the Burmese troops believe the King has brought British soldiers. Despite Alak's orders to regroup, his troops panic and retreat.

Alak confronts Mongkut on a canyon bridge, which he has set with explosives. Despite being outnumbered, Mongkut refuses to kill Alak, saying that he will have to live with his shame. As Mongkut turns to ride back to Siam, Alak fires at Mongkut, but the guards detonate the explosives, blowing the bridge and sending Alak to his death.

The court returns to Bangkok and Anna, emotional as she prepares to leave Siam for good, shares one last dance with Mongkut, who now understands how a man could be content with only one woman. In voice-over, Chulalongkorn tells that he became king following his father's death, and the education he received from Anna led to him abolishing slavery and instituting religious freedom in Siam.

== Cast ==
- Jodie Foster as Anna Leonowens
- Chow Yun-fat as King Mongkut
- Bai Ling as Tuptim
- Tom Felton as Louis T. Leonowens
- Randall Duk Kim as General Alak
- Lim Kay Siu as Prince Chaofa, King Mongkut's Brother
- Melissa Campbell as Princess Fa-Ying
- Deanna Yusoff as Consort Thiang
- Geoffrey Palmer as Lord John Bradley
- Ann Firbank as Lady Bradley
- Bill Stewart as Mycroft Kincaid, East India Trading Co.
- Sean Ghazi as Khun Phra Balat
- Syed Alwi as the Samuha Kralahome (Prime Minister)
- Ramli Hassan as King Chulalongkorn
- Keith Chin as Prince Chulalongkorn
- Kenneth Tsang as Justice Phya Phrom
- Shantini Venugopal as the nanny
- Goh Yi Wai as Mongkut's daughter
- Zaibo as Siamese Trader
- Patrick Teoh as Third Judge
- Kee Thuan Chye as Second Judge
- Harith Iskander as Nikorn
- Afdlin Shauki as Interpreter
- Mano Maniam as Moonshee
- Dharma Harun Al-Rashid as Noi
- Mahmud Ali Basha as Mercenary
- Aimi Aziz as Lady of Court No.1
- Ellie Suriaty as Lady of Court No.2
- Tan Siew Ting Lee as Lady of Court No.3
- Ruby Wong as Lady of Court No.4
- Zaridah Abdul Malik as Lady of Court No.5
- Ahmad Mazlan as Scout No.1
- Razib Salimin as Scout No.2
- Yank Kassim as Pitak
- Lim Yu-Beng as Scarfaced Leader

== Reception ==
Anna and the King received mixed reviews. On Rotten Tomatoes, it holds a 52% rating, based on 100 reviews, with an average rating of 5.87/10. The consensus reads, "Beautiful cinematography can't prevent Anna and the King from being boring and overly lengthy." Metacritic gave the film a score of 56 based on 32 reviews, indicating "mixed or average" reviews. On a $92 million budget, the film underperformed in the United States and Canada where it only grossed $39 million, however, it did much better internationally with a gross of $75 million for a worldwide total of $114 million.

== Controversy ==
After reviewing the script, with changes having been made to try to satisfy them, the Thai government did not allow the film-makers to film in Thailand. The Thai authorities did not permit the film to be distributed in Thailand due to scenes that they construed as a disrespectful and historically inaccurate depiction of King Mongkut.

Tony Dabbs wrote an opinion piece for the Thai newspaper The Nation, criticizing the ban, advocating the use of strong disclaimers, and expanding the issue beyond this picture, saying: “Frankly, I would like to see all films that take strong liberties with the historical facts, as Braveheart and JFK did, also be required to state so at the end of the film”.
