= Louis T. Leonowens =

Son of Anna Leonowens (1856–1919)

Louis Leonowens
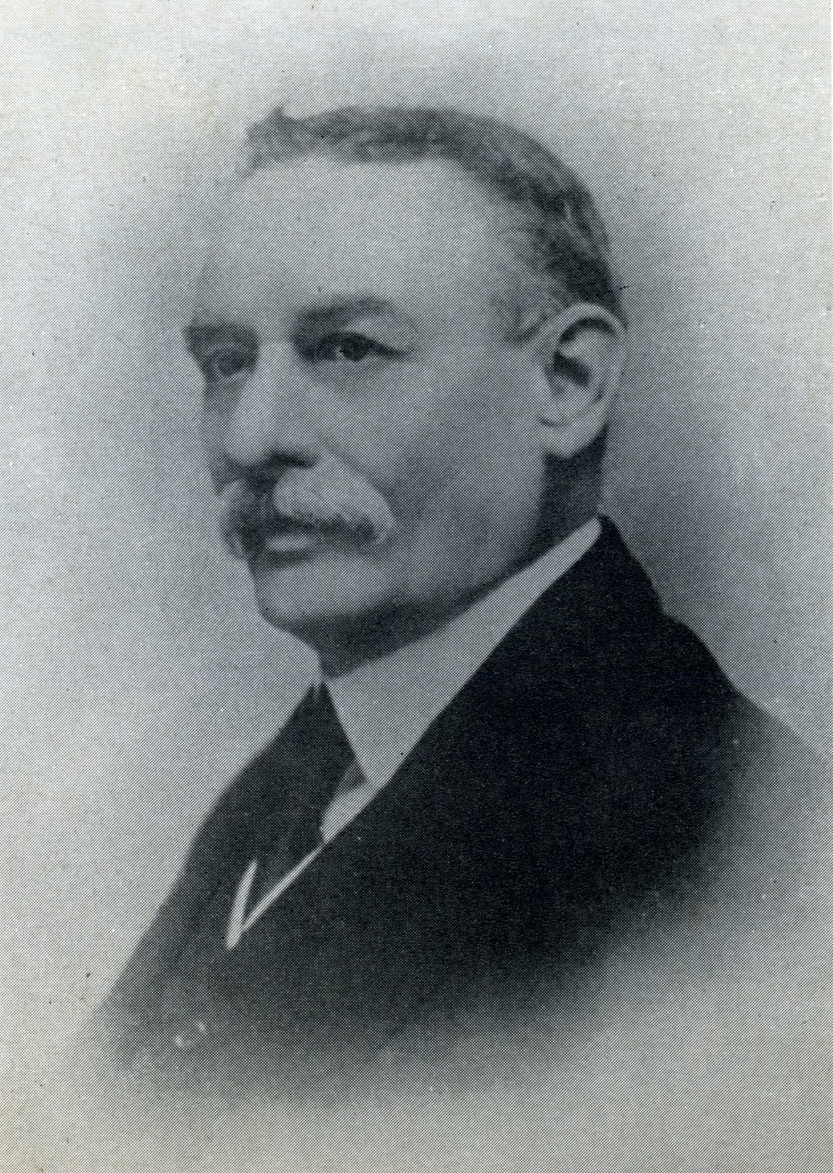
- Born: 25 October 1856; Lynton, Western Australia
- Died: 17 February 1919 (aged 62); Westcliff-on-Sea, United Kingdom
- Resting place: Brompton Cemetery, London
- Spouses: Caroline Knox; Reta May
- Children: 2
- Parents: Thomas Leonowens (father); Anna Leonowens (mother)
- Relatives: Boris Karloff (first cousin once removed)

Louis Thomas Gunnis Leonowens (25 October 1856 – 17 February 1919) was a British subject who grew up and worked in Siam (now Thailand). Leonowens served as an officer in the Siamese Royal Cavalry, an agent for the Borneo Company in the teak trade of Northern Thailand, and founded a Thai trading company that still bears his name, Louis T. Leonowens Ltd.

Louis Leonowens was born to Anna Leonowens in Western Australia and spent time as a child in Penang and Singapore before his mother was invited to teach English to King Mongkut's children in Siam. From age seven he spent six years in Siam and made close friendships with Mongkut and his heir, Prince Chulalongkorn. After spending time in Ireland, the United States, and Australia, he returned to Siam where he became an officer before joining the Borneo Company in its teak trade.

As an agent for the Borneo Company, Leonowens became quite influential over the teak trade and became well-liked by the local inhabitants and the local kings. He protected the king of Lampang during the Ngiao rebellion and in 1905 he founded the Louis T. Leonowens Ltd. He left Siam for the last time in 1914 and spent his last years in the United Kingdom before dying from Spanish Flu in 1919.

His childhood in Siam was adapted and used in the 1944 novel Anna and the King of Siam, as well as other fictional works based on it.

== Early life and education ==
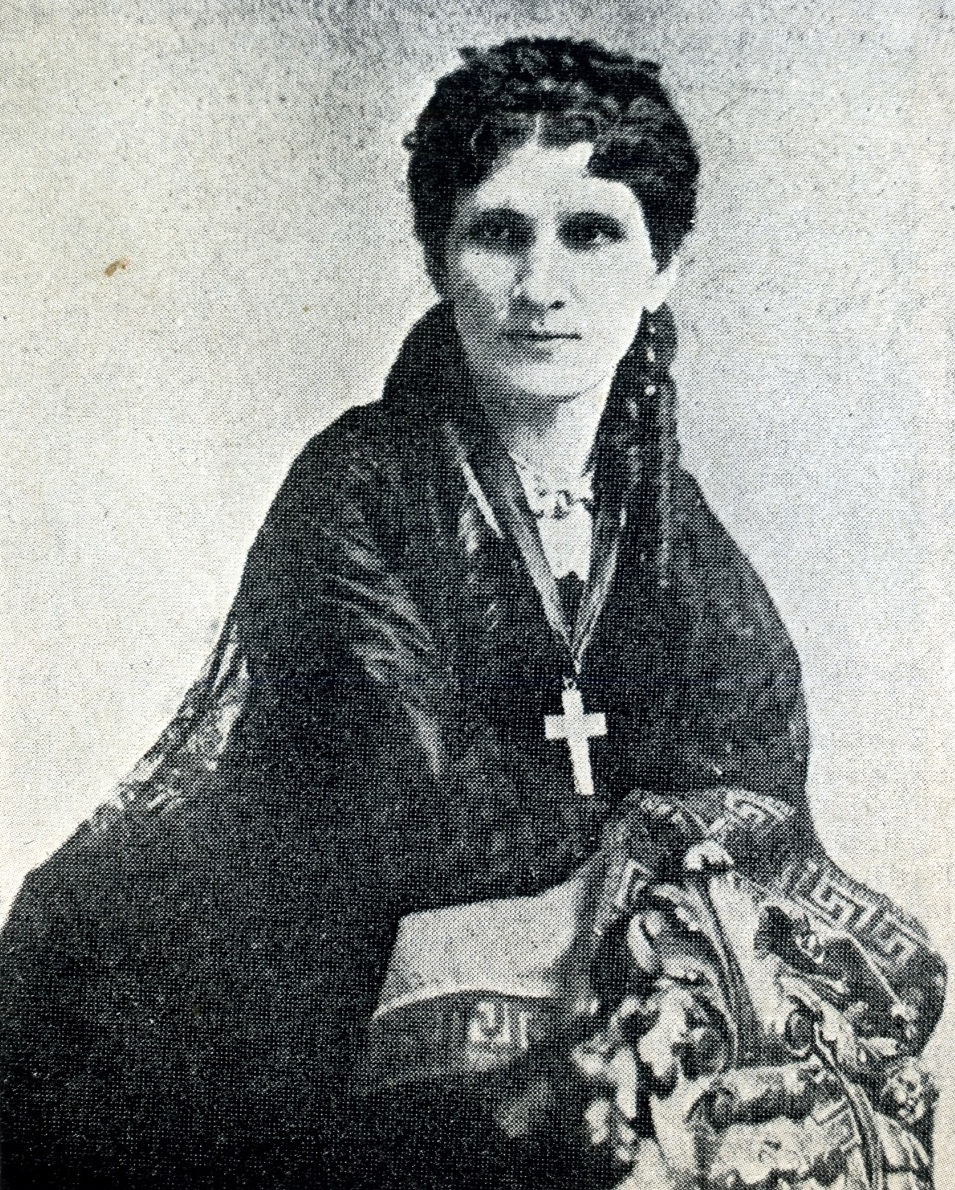
Anna Leonowens in 1862

=== Family ===
Leonowens was the youngest son of Anna Leonowens (née Edwards) and Thomas Leon Owens. His mother, who later became famous as the English governess to the royal Siamese children from portrayals in the 1944 fictionalised biographical novel Anna and the King of Siam and its various adaptations including the 1951 musical The King and I, was actually born and grew up in India, probably of Anglo-Indian ancestry. His father was an Irish-born, India-raised clerk; they married in 1849. The couple left India for Singapore, then part of the Straits Settlements, in 1852.

=== Before arriving in Siam ===
Louis Thomas Gunnis Leonowens was born on 25 October 1856 in Lynton, Western Australia, to Anna and Thomas Leonowens. In Lynton, his father was working for the Commissariat as a clerk. His family then moved to Penang in 1857 where his father was a hotel manager. The family's finances worsened when the Agra bank collapsed due to the Indian mutiny. Thomas died in 1859 from a stroke after he and other officers returned from shooting tigers; Louis was around 3 years old at the time. Together with his mother and older sister, Avis, they moved to Singapore. In Singapore, his mother told the British expatriate community there that she was a genteel Welsh woman, the widow of a British army officer who had unfortunately lost her fortune. Anna also established a school for the children of British army officers until she was invited by King Mongkut of Siam to come teach English to his wives and children. Before Anna travelled to Bangkok, she sent Louis' older sister to be educated in Fulham, England.

=== Childhood in Siam ===
In August 1862, Louis arrived with his mother on board the Chao Phaya in Bangkok at age 7 where he resided in the Grand Palace for the next 6 years. Louis often wrote letters to his sister Avis whom he missed dearly, often crying when he thought about her. When Anna arranged a joint birthday for Avis and Louis (who shared the same birthday: October 25) she wrote to Avis that "he got very merry and drank your health with all his smiles on his face". Their birthday was also attended by Thomas George Knox and his children. Louis later married one of Knox's daughters, Caroline.

Louis often went through sermons led by Dr. Bradley in which he often became restless until these sermons were cut to only being half an hour long. In contrast to his mother, Louis quickly adapted to his new life in Siam, often finding kindness from Mongkut. During his six years in Siam, he was raised and schooled along with the children of Mongkut.

In July 1863 at age 8, he accompanied Mongkut on his yacht the Royal Sovereign upstream the Chao Phraya river to Ayutthaya. Similarly in 1865 at age 10, he went with Mongkut to Phra Pathommachedi, Nakhon Pathom. During his time with the King, Louis was often gifted items and affection. He wrote to his sister about Mongkut saying, "I like the King. He gave me some gold leaf for you which I send", "I have got a gun and a sword, and a beautiful boat the King gave Mama and a paddle too with which I row Mama to the Palace". U.S. consul James Madison Hood described Mongkut as "having regarded [Louis] as an adopted son" at a dinner which Madison attended with Mongkut, his suite and Louis.

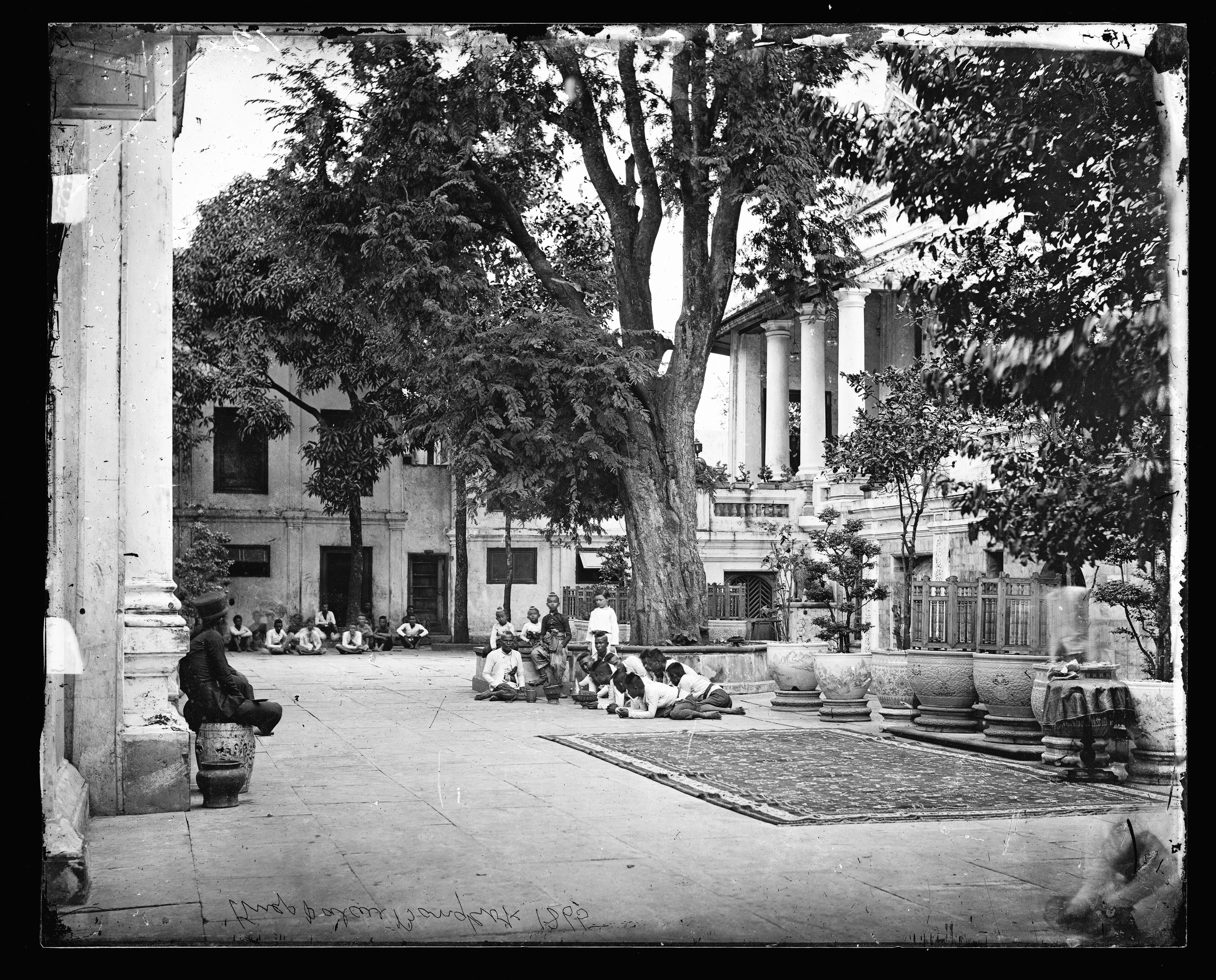
Photo of Louis Leonowens from 1865. Here Louis is pictured standing closest to the tree beside Prince Chulalongkorn

During his time with Mongkut's children, he became close friends with the young princes, notably Mongkut's heir Prince Chulalongkorn who was 2 years older. He also became very friendly with the Samuha Kalahom (Prime-minister of Southern Siam and Chancellor of Military) Chuang Bunnag to the point where when his mother became very-ill, Chuang told Dr. Champell that he would adopt Louis in the event of Anne's death.

In 1865 he began learning Sanskrit and Thai. Due to his exposure to numerous French people, particularly with a French woman called Madame Malherbe who spoke little English and called him 'le beau Louis', he also began learning French. In 1867, when Louis was 10, he began to mimic his mother's tone and manner. However, Anne's health began to decay and she sailed away from the tropics with him.

=== Education in Ireland ===
In early October 1868, while on a vacation with his mother in England at age 11, Mongkut died and was succeeded by his 15-year-old son Chulalongkorn. However, Anna was not invited to return and continue her work in Siam. She eventually found work in New York City but sent Louis to the United Kingdom to complete his education. Louis was sent to live with his relatives Tom and Avis Wilkinson in Enniscorthy, Ireland which housed boys and girls generally older than Louis, who was 12. In Ireland, he attended Kingstown school in Dublin. He also began playing the piano, although initially struggling to play 'Annie Laurie'. He also had to recover his gold chain after it was stolen by another boy, yet he was generally liked, especially among the girls. When he was 14, the Wilkinsons took Louis to the beach where he continued his love for animals that he had since his time in Singapore. After he claimed he was falsely accused of breaking a window with three other boys in 1870 and was facing punishment from the school, Louis decided to run away from the school and managed to reach the United States.

=== United States and Australia ===
By the time he reached the United States in 1871, he was a bit off 15 years. Louis struggled to settle down in Staten island where his family resided, often relying on his mother or her friends for money. In 1873 he began working for the land department of the Cairo and Fulton Railroad company in Arkansas before working for a steamship company in Philadelphia. He had however accumulated numerous debts. Louis decided to flee the U.S. and he became estranged from his mother for 19 years. He first took a ship to Ireland where he said goodbye to the Wilkinsons before travelling to Queensland, Australia. During this time, Anne grew anxious about the whereabouts of her son until she heard that he arrived in Rockhampton in June 1875. Louis set off with two friends to the Palmer gold fields near Cooktown, which was undergoing a gold rush. He did not search for gold but instead became a police officer around the mines for 4 years due to his strong body. In 1881, Louis moved to Kanni Waikerie along the Murray river northeast of Adelaide, where he worked as a stockhand on Leonard Percival's station. Louis then wished to return to his mother in the U.S. and asked her for money to do so, which she denied stating that Louis, who was 25, needed to save up his own money. Instead, he travelled to Bangkok.

== Career ==
=== Royal Cavalry ===
In 1881, at the age of 25, he returned to Siam and was granted a commission of Captain in the Royal Cavalry by Chulalongkorn, which he served until 1884. During this time, he helped suppress tensions between rival Chinese secret societies. However, Louis' resignation from the role was delayed by Chulalongkorn in order for Louis to protect James McCarthy from Haw rebels who were active in the north of the country due to the Haw wars. McCarthy was hired to survey the border between British Burma (now Myanmar) and Siam. Louis was given 200 infantrymen.

The expedition to Siam's north began on 16 January 1884 where they travelled up the Chao Phraya river, disembarking at Prabat to transfer to another boat which they took up to Saraburi. From Saraburi they marched for 12 days to Korat which they reached on 30 January by elephants. Due to their use of elephants, their travel to the Mekong river near Nawng Kai was slow. When they reached Nawng Kai, Louis assisted in repelling a Haw attack. They then crossed the Mekong and passed a Miao inhabited village before Louis decided to give his men target practice to restore morale where he found that most of his men had never fired a gun and were instead frightened by their noise. As he heard that 180 Haws were nearby, he selected the 30 best soldiers and sent the rest to Luang Prabang. Louis then pursued the Haws who began a retreat back to China before giving up and heading arriving in Luang Prabang on 30 May to find that most of his men were sick with malaria, most ended up dying. They then reached a chief who said that the Haws were unlikely to return to this area and so Louis left the group into the hands of a Siamese officer. Chulalongkorn later recalled the expedition due to the amount of death. Now in Bangkok, Louis officially resigned from his role in the Royal Cavalry.

=== Borneo Company ===
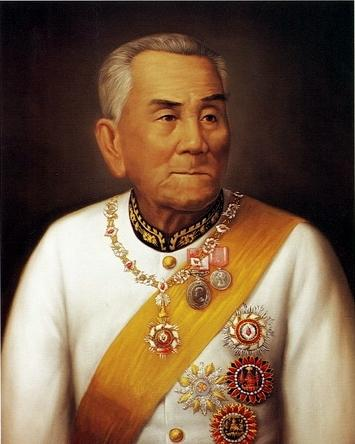
Inthawichayanon of Chiang Mai

From 1882, the teak trade in the north exploded in demand with foreign companies of British, Danish, U.S., Chinese and Dutch origin competing with local Siamese companies. This was due to Hans Niels Andersen arrival back in Bangkok after managing to sell his teak in Liverpool for a large sum. After his resignation from the Royal Cavalry, he joined the Borneo company in its operations in the country's north. The company constructed a teak home for both him and newly wedded wife Caroline Knox at Tak. Louis was then given the Mee Tuen teak forest by Chulalongkorn and their hospitality became very notable to passing foreigners. In January 1888, C.S. Leckie took Louis with him to Chiang Mai over his concerns around Marian Alonso Cheek's spending. Cheek was an U.S. missionary and was employed in the Borneo company with large shares in the company. Cheek's wife Sarah Cheek later wrote to Anna Leonowens where he described Louis as still being "full of fun and mischief," and that he "looks much the same as he did when he was a boy". After a complicated situation, Leckie decided to replace Cheek with Leonowens as the Borneo company agent in Chiang Mai. However the situation was still complicated so Louis was moved to Lampang while Robertson took his place in Tak.

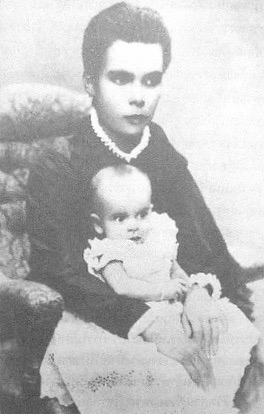
Caroline Isabell Knox, half-Siamese wife of Louis Leonowens

As his wife fell pregnant again with their daughter who was born in 1890, Louis built a home for her in Bangkok on land she inherited from her recently dead mother. Louis' stress around waiting for Cheek's arrival in Bangkok was worsened more when the Bangkok Times criticised Chulalongkorn purchase of walers from Australia at high prices and also stated that the first load of horses Louis brought to Siam in 1882 had been a failure. The editor who wrote the article was then beaten up by Louis. Once Cheek arrived in Bangkok he had a falling out with Leckie and left the Borneo company. Cheek, however, became competition to the Borneo company as he partnered himself with the Siamese government. With Cheek gone from the company, Louis then travelled to Chiang Mai in April 1889 to set up his new headquarters. But similar to how he had been welcoming to Westerners in Tak, he welcomed Westerners to his premises in Chiang Mai and Lampang. In Chiang Mai, he became friendly with the king of Chiang Mai, Inthawichayanon, often gambling with him which allowed his business to grow. Louis later attended his Songkran celebrations on 13 April 1891 where he paraded on an elephant. He later warned the local kings of the northern vassal states not to do business with the Bombay Burmah Teak Company (BBTC) due to its involvement in the British takeover of Burma.

In 1893, Caroline's health declined before her death on 17 May. Afterwards, he went on leave from the company taking his two children to London where he was reunited with his mother for the first time in 20 years. Anna then left for Halifax with Louis' children where they were raised with Avis' children. In his return to Siam, Louis fell into a state of depression where he often got drunk in Chiang Mai and in the Oriental Hotel in Bangkok.

On 31 May 1894, Cheek's health declined and Louis took over his teak compound and teak forests. Around this time, the BBTC attempted to defame Louis by alleging that he was a bad character who spent time in jail during his time in Australia. The British vice-consul W.J Archer also described Louis as 'living as a native' and he was described at the London Thatched House Club as being another Rajah Brooke. These comments later led to Leckie travelling to Chiang Mai on 12 August 1895 where he decided to not renew Louis' contract when it ended in 1896. Louis however resigned on 1 December 1895. However the teak tree forests had been leased personally to Louis and not the Borneo company.

=== Business after the Borneo Company ===
Wishing to not trade with either the Borneo company or the BBTC, Louis began trading with the French. However his cooperation with the French was quickly over due to Siamese fears of French influence over the north. At the same time, when his foresters were at a BBTC office they saw a swarm of ants over the BBTC safe which they saw as an omen of prosperity and shifted their allegiance from Louis to the BBTC. This drastically affected his supplies and forced him into cooperation with the BBTC. In August 1897, he travelled with Prince Nisbet to Yangon where he signed a 6-year agreement with the BBTC where the BBTC was to pay £1800 (equivalent to £202,000 in 2025) for Louis not to get involved in timber and handed over his teak forests to the BBTC. After the deaths of the kings of Lampang and Chiang Mai in March 1896 and November 1897 respectively, the Siamese government began consolidating their authority over the north. In 1898 he supported the proposal to buy land in Chiang Mai to encourage sport among Westerners. Louis married Reta May Maclaughlan on 12 August 1900.

After their marriage, the two travelled to Lampang. In 1901, his 6-year agreement with the BBTC was terminated two years earlier then planned. Louis then sold the remaining logs to the BBTC's competitor the East Asiatic company. In Lampang, Louis often preferred and encouraged the cultivation of a variety of sweet glutinous rice the locals named 'Nai Louis'. Both Louis and Reta became popular in Lampang, and Louis was often treated as if he was a prince and was referred to as 'nai missa Louis'.

=== Ngiao Rebellion ===
Louis met Harold Lyle on 8 July 1896 and helped Lyle on November 1 to reach Nan to set up a sub-consulate. When Shan rebels took over Phrae in a coup on 25 July 1902, they intended to end Siamese control over the area and potentially all of Northern Siam. Louis was persuaded to donate 50 elephants to the Siamese. The first target of the Shans was Lampang where Louis was still living. The King of Lampang, Bunwatwongse Mani, sought protection from Louis in his home. Louis then began organising the town's defences while Bunwatwongse organised 1000 soldiers. With R.C Thompson, Louis erected nine V-shaped teak barriers on major roads in time for reinforcements led by Captain Jensen from Chiang Mai to arrive. Along with the Europeans, important Siamese were housed together with the Europeans in the same houses. European wives were however evacuated to Chiang Mai on July 30. The Shans then attacked at dawn on 4 August. As the barricade along the riverside fell to the Shans, Louis and his men fired upon their positions from his compound. However, the residences of Lampang still feared another Shan attack and Jensen's men were low on ammunition meaning that Lampang could not resist another attack. As Jensen's role was the protection of Bunwatwongse, he and Louis led Bunwatwongse to Chiang Mai. However, Bunwatwongse's absence caused Lampang to descend into a state of anarchy. Together with Jensen, Bunwatwongse travelled back to Lampang while Louis continued on to Chiang Mai which he reached on 9 August. In Chiang Mai, he corresponded with the vice-consul Becket who dispatched Harold Lyle to restore order in Phrae. Though the rebellion ended by late August, an insurgency continued and multiple teak logs were stolen by Shan insurgents.

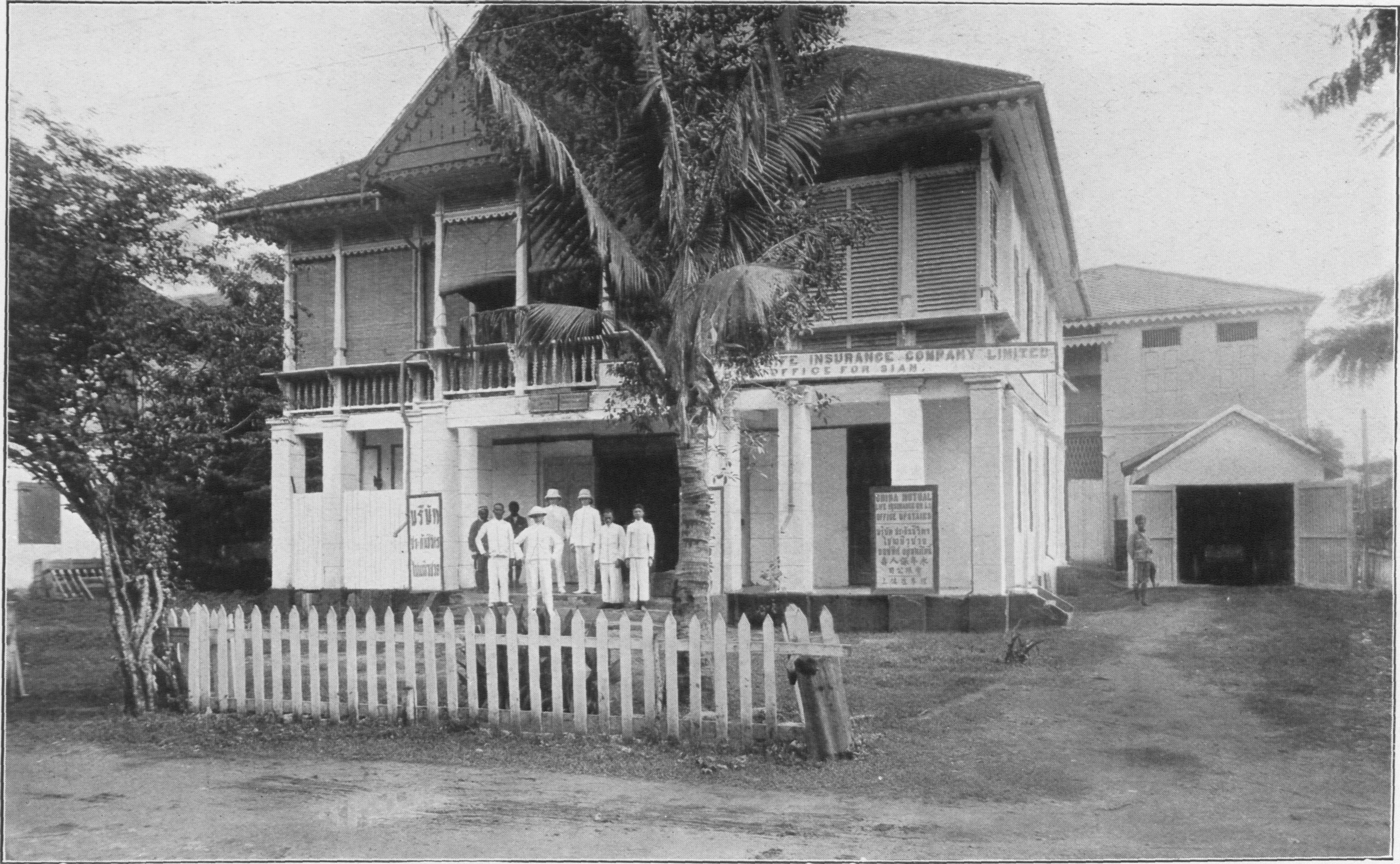
An office of Louis T. Leonowens Ltd in 1908

=== Louis T. Leonowens Ltd. ===
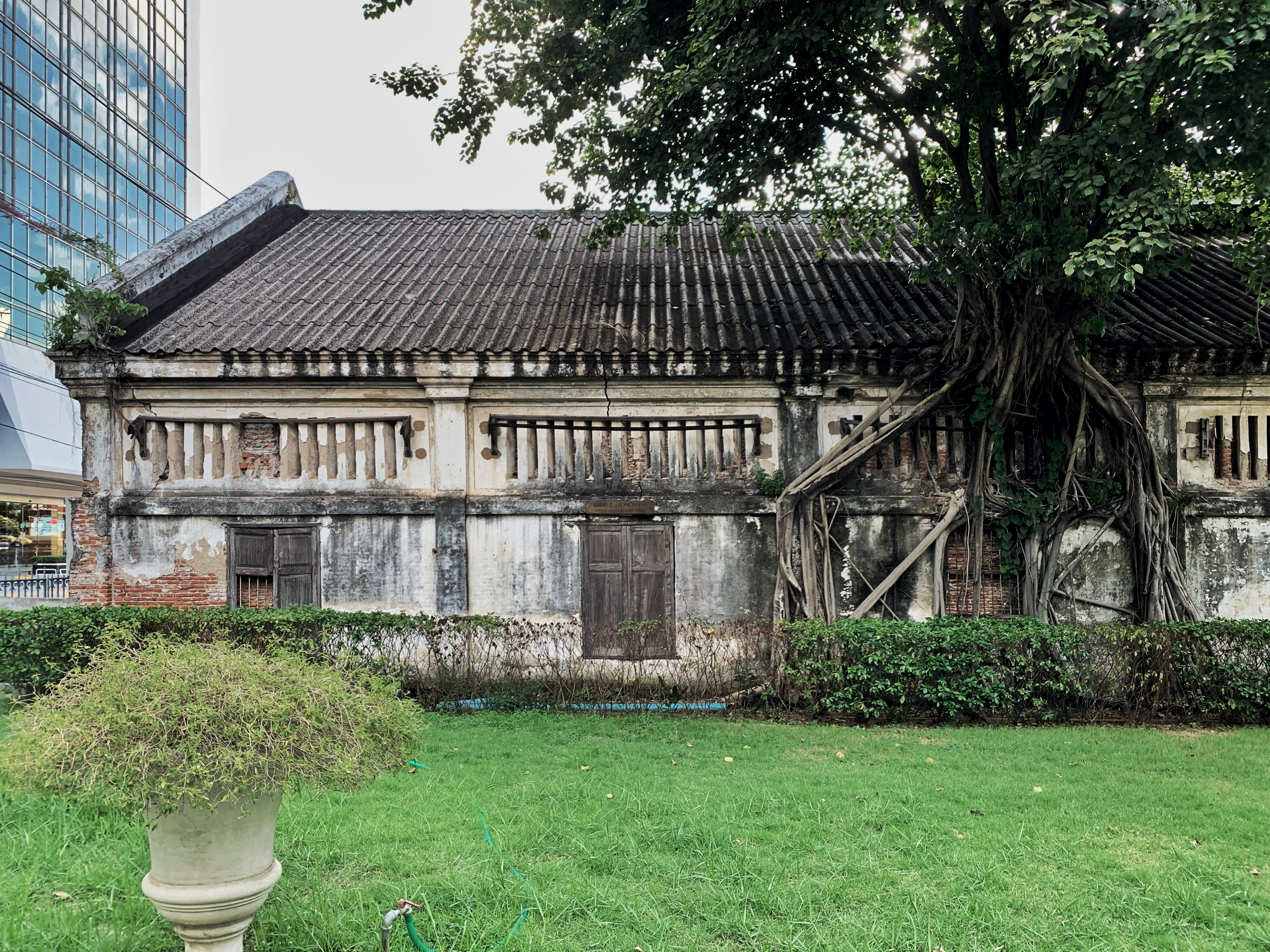
The Louis T. Leonowens warehouse remains in Bangkok's Captain Bush Lane as of 2021

Louis travelled with Reta in February 1904 on a holiday where they travelled to England but contracted bronchitis. During the summer, they travelled to Canada where Louis met his mother and children George and Anna for the first time in 11 years where he gifted them fans from Ayutthaya. Louis then decided upon gradually retiring.

On 3 March 1905, he founded the Louis Thomas Leonowens Company with a capital of £115,000 (equivalent to £12,090,000 in 2025). His company dealt with the manufacturing of champagne, whisky, typewriters, cigars, cement and engineering products. This company remained a leading exporter of Malayan hardwoods and an importer of building materials and general merchandise at least into the 1960s, and continues to do business as a marketing and distribution company.

In 1986, Louis T. Leonowens Ltd. merged with Muller & Phipps (Thai) Ltd. The company is now a wholly owned subsidiary of the U.S.-based international marketing and distribution company, Getz Bros & Co., Inc. Louis T. Leonowens (Thailand) is a member of Getz Group of Companies.

== World War I and death ==
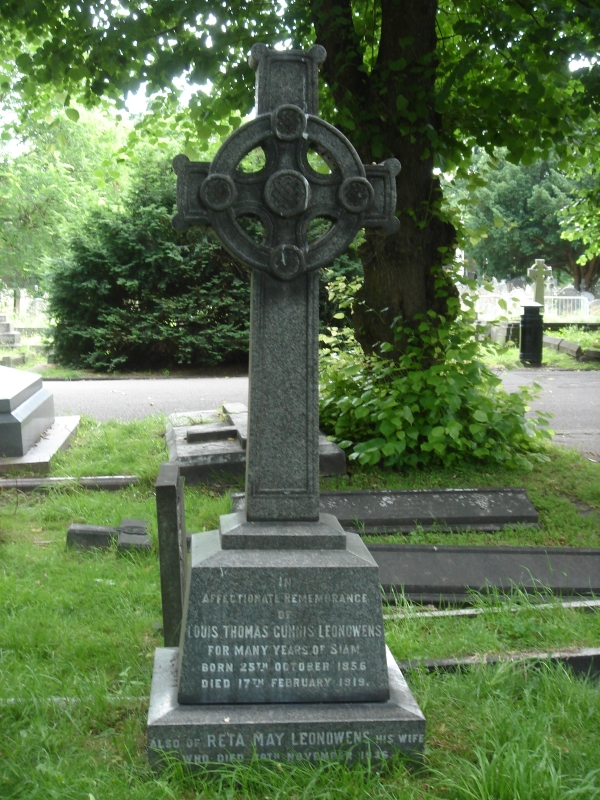
Funerary monument, Brompton Cemetery, London

After the establishment of Louis T. Leonowens Ltd., Louis gradually retired to his office in London. However, he and Reta remained very friendly to their friends in Bangkok including Chulalongkorn and other Europeans. They often played sport, attended musical societies and watched horse races. Louis attended the wedding of his nephew James Fyssche in Bangkok to Miss Mattice. From 1906, Louis and Reta began spending more of their time away from Siam in England. In 1908, the couple visited Penang for a business trip. For his daughter Anne's debutante ball, he gifted her several dresses among others. Louis made his last trip to Siam in 1914, 4 years after the death of Chulalongkorn. When the First World War began in the middle of 1914, Louis fell into a more depressed state. When his son George (age 26) and 2 nephews came over to Britain with the Canadian army for the war, Louis held a party for them. During the war, Reta devoted herself to the hospitals in London but Louis never joined the army due to him being aged 58. His son George survived the war and lived until 1953.

When the Spanish Flu pandemic reached the United Kingdom, Louis fell sick and died on 17 February 1919 at Westcliff aged 62 in the presence of his nephew James Fyssche and friend John Anderson. Louis was later buried in Brompton Cemetery, London, where he was joined by Reta when she died in 1936. Louis's wealth was split between his children and Reta, but most of the £100,273 (equivalent to £4,480,000 in 2025) left to Reta, she donated £90,000 (equivalent to £4,020,000 in 2025) to Siamese charities in Louis' name. This money was contributed to the Siamese Red Cross, Bangkok Nursing home, and to building the Chulalongkorn hospital.

== Personal life ==
Leonowens was married to:

- Caroline Knox (26 May 1856 – 17 May 1893), the youngest daughter of Sir Thomas George Knox, British consul-general in Siam from 1868 to 1879, and his wife, Prang Yen, a Siamese noblewoman. They had one son, Thomas ("George") Knox Leonowens (1888–1953) and a daughter, Anna Harriett Leonowens (born 1890, Mrs Richard Monahan).
- Reta May (1880–1936) married Leonowens in 1900. They had no children.

== Depiction in media ==
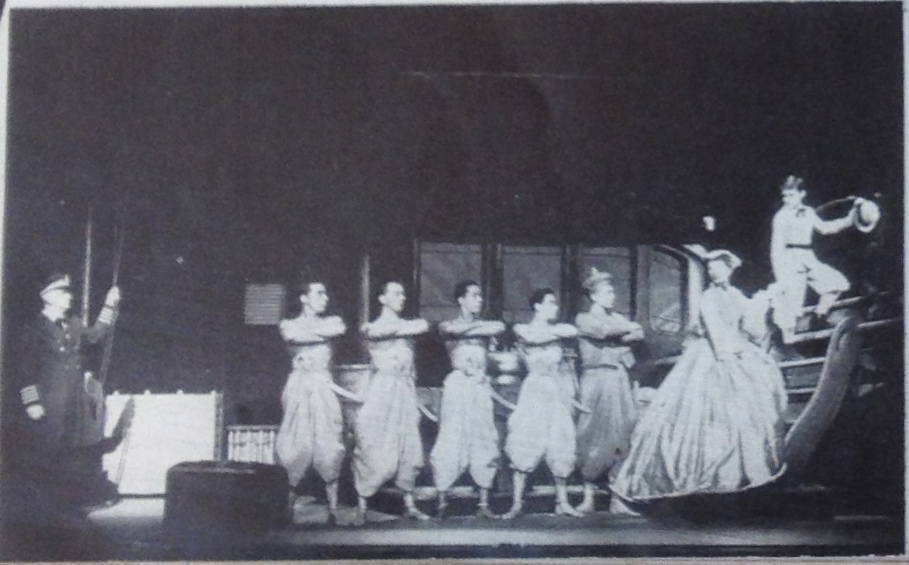
Sandy Kennedy portrayed Louis Leonowens (furthest to the right) in a souvenir program for The King and I in 1951

Louis Leonowens' time as a young boy in Siam has been portrayed numerous times by several actors from at least three different countries, including the United States, England and Wales. This is due to these stories mostly focusing on Anna Leonowens' time in Siam, which Louis was a boy then. Films he was portrayed in include:

- Anna and the King of Siam (1946) by Richard Lyon;
- The King and I (1951 musical) by Sandy Kennedy;
- The King and I (1956 film) by Rex Thompson;
- Anna and the King (1971 TV series) by Eric Shea;
- 1985 Broadway revival of The King and I by Jeff B. Davis;
- Anna and the King (1999 film) by Tom Felton;
- The King and I (1999 animated film) by Adam Wylie (voice);
- 2015 Broadway revival of The King and I by Jake Lucas;
- 2017 Broadway National Tour of The King and I by Graham Montgomery;

Louis is also the subject of the 1976 book Louis and the King of Siam by William Syer, which covers both his childhood in Siam and his life through to his death.
