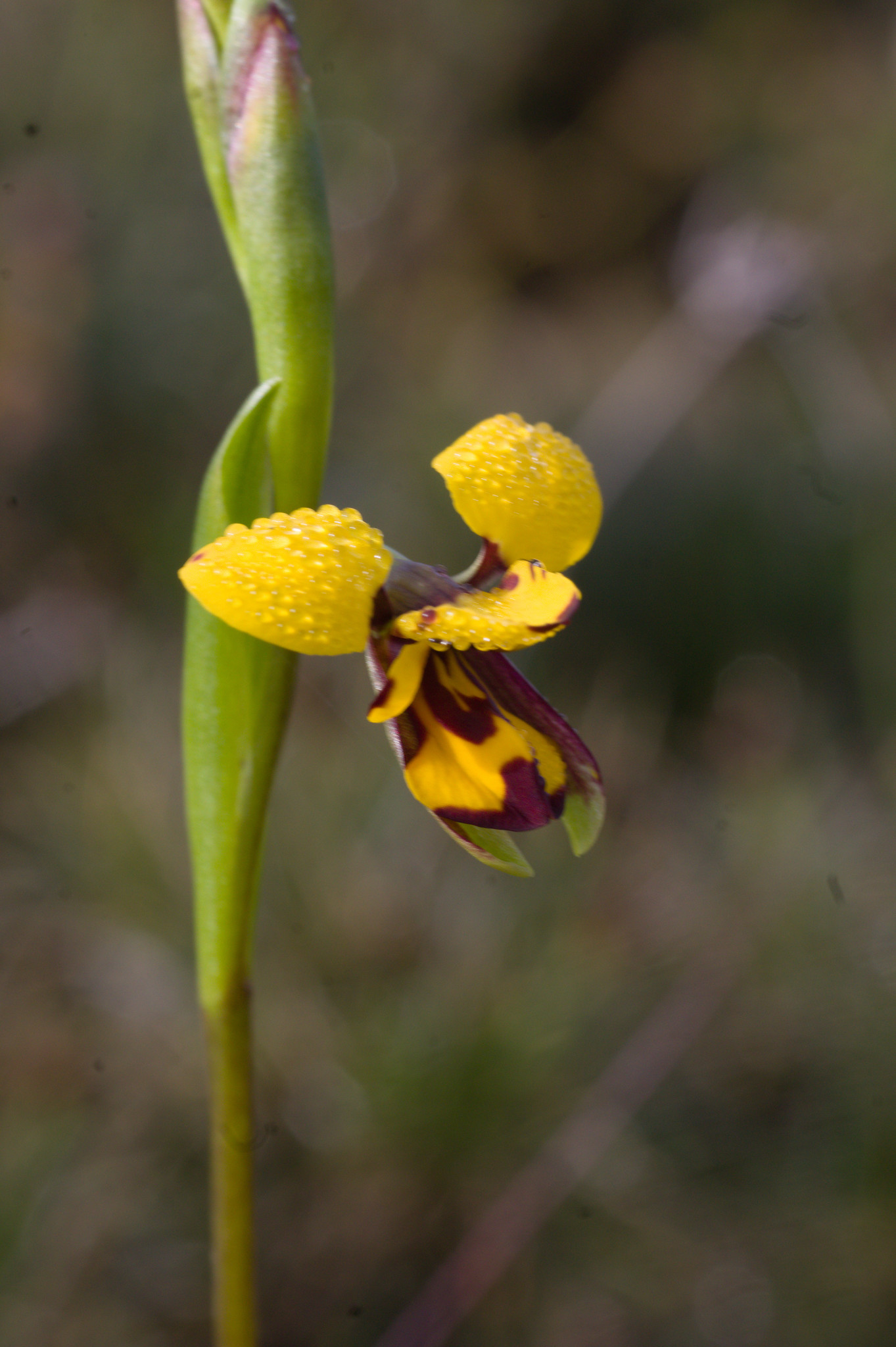
- Near Wubin

Scientific classification
- Kingdom: Plantae
- Clade: Embryophytes
- Clade: Tracheophytes
- Clade: Angiosperms
- Clade: Monocots
- Order: Asparagales
- Family: Orchidaceae
- Subfamily: Orchidoideae
- Tribe: Diurideae
- Genus: Diuris
- Species: D. septentrionalis

Binomial name
- Diuris septentrionalis D.L.Jones & C.J.French

= Diuris septentrionalis =

Northern bee orchid

Species of orchid

Diuris septentrionalis, commonly known as northern bee orchid, is a species of orchid that is endemic to the south-west of Western Australia. It has two or three linear leaves and up to five yellow flowers with dark red markings.

== Description ==
Diuris septentrionalis is a tuberous, perennial herb with two or three linear leaves 80–200 mm (3.1–7.9 in) long and 1.8–2.2 mm (0.071–0.087 in) wide. Up to five yellow flowers with dark red markings, 25–30 mm (0.98–1.18 in) long and 12–15 mm (0.47–0.59 in) wide are borne on a flowering stem 180–400 mm (7.1–15.7 in) tall. The dorsal sepal is tapering egg-shaped to elliptic, 10–15 mm (0.39–0.59 in) long and 5–7 mm (0.20–0.28 in) wide. The lateral sepals are parallel or crossed near the tip, 10–18 mm (0.39–0.71 in) long, 1–3 mm (0.039–0.118 in) wide and project forwards. The petals are paddle-shaped, the blades elliptic to egg-shaped or round, 8–13 mm (0.31–0.51 in) long and 5–9 mm (0.20–0.35 in) wide on a reddish-brown stalk 3–6 mm (0.12–0.24 in) long. The labellum is 8–14 mm (0.31–0.55 in) long with three lobes - the centre lobe broadly wedge-shaped to heart-shaped, 8–12 mm (0.31–0.47 in) long and 7–10 mm (0.28–0.39 in) wide. The side lobes spread widely apart and are oblong, 4–7 mm (0.16–0.28 in) long and 2.0–4.5 mm (0.079–0.177 in) wide. There are two smooth calli ridges outlined with red near the mid-line of the labellum. Flowering occurs in August and September.

== Taxonomy and naming ==
Diuris septentrionalis was first formally described in 2013 by David Jones and Christopher J. French in Australian Orchid Review, from a specimen collected by French in 2001. The specific epithet (septentrionalis) means "north" or "northern", referring to the distribution of the species.

== Distribution and habitat ==
Northern bee orchid grows in winter-wet shrubland between Regans Ford and areas inland from Kalbarri in the Avon Wheatbelt, Geraldton Sandplains, Jarrah Forest, Swan Coastal Plain bioregions of south-western Western Australia.

== Conservation ==
Diuris septentrionalis is listed as "not threatened" by the Western Australian Government Department of Biodiversity, Conservation and Attractions.
