= The King and I (1999 film soundtrack) =

Soundtrack album
- Released: 1999
- Length: 59:57 or 59:59
- Label: Sony Classical

Professional ratings
Review scores
Source	Rating
Show Music	positive
AllMusic	3/5 stars

The original soundtrack to the 1999 animated film The King and I (produced by Warner Bros. Family Entertainment) was released on compact disc (and compact cassette) by Sony Classical in the same year.

== Content ==
The animated film did not use some songs from the original musical. Some were only heard in a medley played over the end credits, as performed by Barbra Streisand. The Streisand track, taken from her Broadway Album, opens the soundtrack CD.

The songs from the actual film are sung by Christiane Noll (the singing voice of Miranda Richardson as Anna), Martin Vidnovic (the King), Tracy Venner Warren, David Burnham.

== Critical reception ==
The magazine Show Music viewed the animated film negatively, but stated: "Most of the film's worst sins aren't apparent from the soundtrack album" and assessed the songs from the animated feature as "competently performed".

== Track listing ==
CD (Sony Classical SK 63386)

All lyrics are written by Oscar Hammerstein II; all music is composed by Richard Rodgers.

No.	Title	Length
1.	"I Have Dreamed / We Kiss in a Shadow / Something Wonderful" (*)
2.	"Getting to Know You"
3.	"The March of the Siamese Children"
4.	"A Puzzlement"
5.	"I Whistle a Happy Tune"
6.	"Hello, Young Lovers"
7.	"I Have Dreamed"
8.	"Shall I Tell You What I Think of You?"
9.	"Prayer to Buddha"
10.	"Anna Remembers / Shall We Dance? Fantasy"
11.	"Shall We Dance? – Finale"
12.	"Prologue"
13.	"Arrival in Siam / Moonshee's Mischief"
14.	"Two Servants / Anna's Demands"
15.	"Kralahome's Scheme / Tuptim's Gift / Anna's Academy"
16.	"Everything Scientific / Children Outside Palace"
17.	"What to Say to Growing Son / Evil Duo"
18.	"Anna Will Stay"
19.	"Mango Madness / Kralahome's Sinister Trap"
20.	"Banquet / King's Threat / Balloon Rescue"
21.	"King's Fate / Prince's Future / Kralahome's Demise / Anna's Surprise"
22.	"Finale"

Notes

(*) Vocals by Barbra Streisand
Arranged, orchestrated, and conducted by William Kidd
