= Anna Leonowens =

British educator (1831–1915)

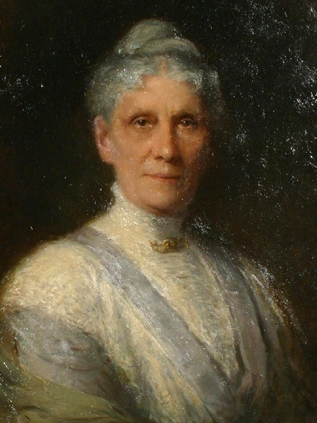
- Anna Leonowens, c. 1905
- Born: Ann Hariett Emma Edwards; 5 November 1831; Ahmednagar, Bombay Presidency, India
- Died: 19 January 1915 (aged 83); Montreal, Quebec, Canada
- Resting place: Mount Royal Cemetery
- Spouse: Thomas Leon (or Lane/Lean) Owens (m. 1849; died 1859)
- Children: 4, including Louis T. Leonowens
- Relatives: Boris Karloff (great-nephew)

Anna Harriette Leonowens (Note: Thai: แหม่มแอนนา ("Ma'am Anna" in Thai)) (born Ann Hariett Emma Edwards; 5 November 1831 – 19 January 1915) was an Anglo-Indian or Indian-born British travel writer, educator, and social activist. She became well known with the publication of her memoirs, beginning with The English Governess at the Siamese Court (1870), which chronicled her experiences in Siam (modern Thailand), as teacher to the children of the Siamese King Mongkut.

Leonowens's own account of her time in Siam was fictionalised in Margaret Landon's best-selling novel Anna and the King of Siam (1944) as well as adaptations such as Rodgers and Hammerstein's 1951 Tony Award-winning musical The King and I and its Academy Award-winning 1956 film adaptation, a short-lived CBS sitcom Anna and the King (1972), and the Academy Award-nominated film Anna and the King (1999).

During the course of her life, Leonowens also lived in Western Australia, Singapore and Penang, the United States, Canada, and Germany. In later life, she was a lecturer of Indology and a suffragist. Among other achievements, she co-founded the Nova Scotia College of Art and Design.

== Early life and family ==
Anna was born in Ahmednagar in the Bombay Presidency of Company-ruled India, on 5 November 1831, three months after the death of her father, Sergeant Thomas Edwards. While she was christened Ann Hariett Emma Edwards, Leonowens later changed Ann to Anna and Hariett to Harriette and ceased using her third given name (Emma).

Anna Leonowens's mother, Mary Ann Glascott, married Edwards, a non-commissioned officer in the East India Company's Corps of Sappers and Miners, on 15 March 1829 in St James's Church, Tannah, Bombay Presidency, British India. Edwards was from London and a former cabinetmaker.

Leonowens's maternal grandfather, William Vawdrey (or Vaudrey) Glascott, was an English-born commissioned officer of the 4th Regiment, Bombay Native Infantry, in the Bombay Army. Glascott arrived in India in 1810, and was apparently married in 1815, although his wife's name is not known. According to biographer Susan Morgan, the only viable explanation for the complete and deliberate lack of information regarding Glascott's wife in official British records is that she "was not European". Morgan suggests that she was "most likely ... Anglo-Indian (of mixed race) born in India." Anna's mother, Mary Anne Glascott, was born in 1815 or 1816.

For most of her adult life, Anna Leonowens had no contact with her family and took pains to disguise her origins by claiming that she had been born with the surname Crawford in Caernarfon, Wales, and giving her father's rank as captain. By doing so, she protected not only herself but her children, who would have had greater opportunities if their possibly mixed-race heritage remained unknown. Investigations uncovered no record of her birth at Caernarfon, although the town had long claimed her as one of its most famous natives.

A few months after Anna's birth, her mother married Patrick Donohoe, an Irish Catholic corporal of the Royal Engineers. The family relocated repeatedly within Western India, following Donohoe's regiment. In 1841, they settled in Deesa, Gujarat. Anna attended the Bombay Education Society's girls school in Byculla (now a neighbourhood of Mumbai) that admitted "mixed-race" children whose military fathers were either dead or absent. Leonowens later said she had attended a British boarding school and had arrived in India, which she described as a "strange land" to her, at the age of 15. Anna's relationship with her stepfather Donohoe was not a happy one, and she later accused him of putting pressure on her to marry a much older man as her sister had done. In 1847, Donohoe was seconded as assistant supervisor of public works in Aden, Yemen. It is unclear whether the rest of the family went with him or stayed in India.

On 24 April 1845, Anna's 15-year-old sister, Eliza Julia Edwards, married James Millard, a sergeant-major with the 4th Troop Artillery, Indian Army in Deesa. Anna served as a witness to this marriage. Their daughter, Eliza Sarah Millard, born in 1848 in India, married on 7 October 1864 in Surat, Gujarat, India. Her husband was Edward John Pratt, a 38-year-old British civil servant. One of their sons, William Henry Pratt, born 23 November 1887 upon their return to London, was better known by his stage name of Boris Karloff; Anna was thus his great-aunt. Anna Edwards never approved of her sister's marriage, and her self-imposed separation from the family was so complete that, a decade later, when Eliza contacted her during her stay in Siam, she replied by threatening suicide if she persisted.

Leonowens claimed that she had gone on a three-year tour through Egypt and the Middle East with the orientalist Reverend George Percy Badger and his wife. However, recent biographies consider this episode to be fictitious. Anna may have met Badger in India and listened to or read reports about his travels.

== Marriage, Western Australia and widowhood ==
Anna Edwards married Thomas Leon Owens on Christmas Day 1849 in the Anglican church of Pune. In the marriage certificate, Owens merged his second and last names to 'LeonOwens'. Owens, an Irish Protestant from Enniscorthy, County Wexford, had come to India with the 28th Regiment of Foot in 1843. From a private, he rose to the position of paymaster's clerk (rather than the army officer suggested by Anna's memoir) in 1844, serving first in Pune, and from December 1845 until 1847 in Deesa. Biographer Alfred Habegger characterises him as "well read and articulate, strongly opinionated, historically informed, and almost a gentleman". Anna Edwards, who was seven years his junior, fell in love with him. However, her mother and stepfather objected to the relationship due to Owens' poor prospects for gainful employment and since he had been temporarily downgraded from sergeant to private for an unspecified offence. According to Leonowens', her stepfather had violently opposed the marriage; however, Patrick Donohoe signed the marriage certificate. The couple had four children together before Thomas Leonowens' death in 1859, and two died in infancy. Leonowens' first daughter, Selina, was born in December 1850 and died at seventeen months.

In 1852, the young couple, accompanied by Anna's uncle, W. V. Glasscott, sailed to Australia via Singapore, where they boarded the barque Alibi. While on board, Anna gave birth to a son named Thomas. (Note: Thomas's date of birth was recorded at his baptism as 24 January 1853. (Register of Baptisms, Wesley Church, Perth, Acc. 1654A, Battye Library, Perth, baptism no. 150, 1 May 1853.)) On 8 March 1853, the Alibi was almost wrecked on a reef as it approached the Western Australian coast. Ten days later, Anna, Thomas, their newborn son and Glasscott arrived in Perth. Glasscott and Thomas Leonowens quickly found employment as clerks in the colonial administration. Later in 1853, Glasscott accepted a position as government commissariat storekeeper at Lynton, a small and remote settlement that was the site of Lynton Convict Depot. Glasscott became involved in frequent disagreements with the abrasive resident magistrate, William Burges. Within three years, Glasscott had returned to India and taken up a career in teaching before dying suddenly in 1856.

Anna Leonowens, using her middle name of Harriett, tried to establish a school for young ladies. In March 1854, the infant Thomas died at the age of 13 months, and, later that year, a daughter, Avis Annie, was born. (Note: The birth certificate of Avis Leonowens cited her mother's name as "Harriette Annie Leonowens", née Edwards. (Register of Births, Western Australia, no. 2583, 1854.)) In 1855, Thomas Leonowens was appointed to Glasscott's former position with the commissariat at Lynton, and the family moved there. At Lynton, Anna Leonowens gave birth to a son, Louis. (Note: Louis Thomas Leonowens's birth was officially registered at Port Gregory, as Lynton had not yet been gazetted. His mother's name was recorded as "Harriet Leonowens", née Edwards. (Register of Births, Western Australia, 1856, no. 3469.)) During late 1856, Thomas Leonowens also served briefly as magistrate's clerk under William Burges. Like Glasscott, Thomas clashed with Burges but survived until the Convict Depot was closed in 1857, and he was transferred to a more senior position with the Commissariat in Perth.

The Leonowens family left Australia abruptly in April 1857, sailing to Singapore, and then moving to Penang, where Thomas found work as a hotel keeper. In or before the first week of May 1859, Thomas Leonowens died of "apoplexy" and was buried (7 May 1859) in the Protestant Cemetery in Penang. His death left Anna Leonowens an impoverished widow. She returned to Singapore, where she created a new identity as a Welsh-born lady and widow of a British army major. To support her daughter Avis and son Louis, Leonowens again took up teaching and opened a school for the children of British officers in Singapore. While the enterprise was not a financial success, it established her reputation as an educator.

== Teacher at the Siamese court ==
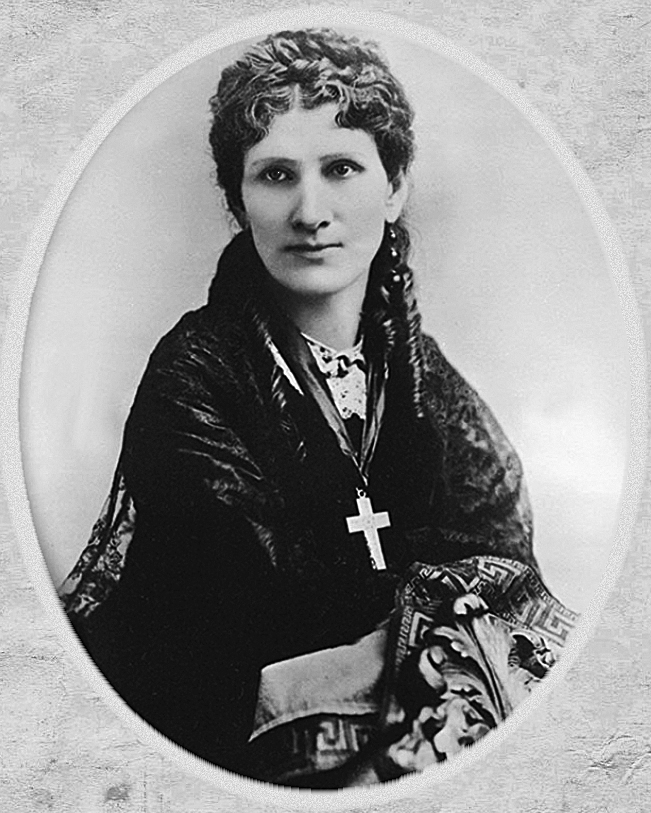
Anna Leonowens, c. 1862

In 1862, Leonowens accepted an offer made by the consul in Singapore, Tan Kim Ching, to teach the wives and children of Mongkut, King of Siam. The king wished to give his 39 wives and concubines and 82 children a modern Western education on scientific secular lines, which earlier missionaries' wives had not provided. Leonowens sent her daughter Avis to school in England, and took her son Louis with her to Bangkok. She succeeded Dan Beach Bradley, an American missionary, as teacher to the Siamese court.

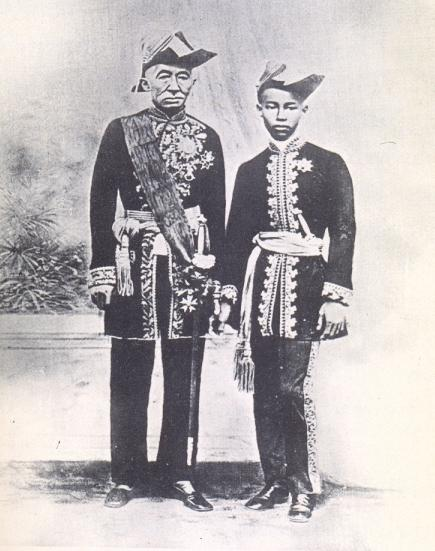
King Mongkut with his heir, Prince Chulalongkorn, both in naval uniforms (c. 1866)

Leonowens served at court until 1867, a period of nearly six years, first as a teacher and later as language secretary for the King. Although her position carried great respect and even a degree of political influence, she did not find the terms and conditions of her employment to her satisfaction. And, despite her position at the king's court, she was never invited into the social circle of the British merchants and traders of the area.

In 1868, Leonowens was on leave for her health in England and had been negotiating a return to the court on better terms when Mongkut fell ill and died. The King mentioned Leonowens and her son in his will, though they did not receive a legacy. The new monarch, fifteen-year-old Chulalongkorn, who succeeded his father, wrote Leonowens a warm letter of thanks for her services. He did not invite her to resume her post, but they corresponded amicably for many years. At the age of 27, Louis Leonowens returned to Siam and was granted a commission of Captain in the Royal Cavalry. Chulalongkorn made reforms for which his former tutor claimed some of the credit, including the abolition of the practice of prostration before the royal person. However, many of those same reforms were goals that had been established by his father.

== Literary career ==
By 1869, Leonowens was in New York City, where she briefly opened a school for girls in the West New Brighton section of Staten Island, and she began contributing travel articles to a Boston journal, The Atlantic Monthly, including "The Favorite of the Harem", reviewed by The New York Times as "an Eastern love story, having apparently a strong basis of truth". She expanded her articles into two volumes of memoirs, beginning with The English Governess at the Siamese Court (1870), which earned her immediate fame but also brought charges of sensationalism. In her writing, she casts a critical eye over court life; the account is not always a flattering one, and has become the subject of controversy in Thailand, and she has also been accused of exaggerating her influence with the king.

There have also been claims of fabrication: the likelihood of the argument over slavery, for example, when King Mongkut was for 27 years a Buddhist monk and later abbot, before ascending to the throne. It is thought that his religious training and vocation would never have permitted the views expressed by Leonowens's cruel, eccentric and self-indulgent monarch. Even the title of her memoir is inaccurate, as she was neither English nor did she work as a governess: Her task was to teach English, not to educate and care for the royal children comprehensively. Leonowens claimed to have spoken Thai fluently, but the examples of that language presented in her books are unintelligible, even if one allows for clumsy transcription.

Leonowens was a feminist, and in her writings she tended to focus on what she saw as the subjugated status of Siamese women, including those sequestered within the Nang Harm, or royal harem. She emphasised that although Mongkut had been a forward-looking ruler, he had desired to preserve customs such as prostration and sexual slavery that seemed unenlightened and degrading. The sequel, Romance of the Harem (1873), incorporates tales based on palace gossip, including the king's alleged torture and execution of one of his concubines, Tuptim. The story lacks independent corroboration and is dismissed as out of character for the king by some critics. A great-granddaughter, Princess Vudhichalerm Vudhijaya (b. 21 May 1934), stated in a 2001 interview, "King Mongkut was in the monk's hood for 27 years before he was king. He would never have ordered an execution. It is not the Buddhist way." She added that the same Tuptim was her grandmother and had married Chulalongkorn as one of his minor wives. Moreover, there were no dungeons below the Grand Palace or anywhere else in Bangkok as the high ground-water level would not allow this. Nor are there any accounts of a public burning by other foreigners staying in Siam during the same period as Leonowens.

While in the United States, Leonowens also earned much-needed money through popular lecture tours. At venues such as the house of Mrs. Sylvanus Reed in Fifty-third Street, New York City, in the regular members' course at Association Hall, or under the auspices of bodies such as the Long Island Historical Society, she lectured on subjects including "Christian Missions to Pagan Lands" and "The Empire of Siam, and the City of the Veiled Women". The New York Times reported: "Mrs. Leonowens' purpose is to awaken an interest, and enlist sympathies, in behalf of missionary labors, particularly in their relation to the destiny of Asiatic women." She joined the literary circles of New York and Boston and made the acquaintance of local lights on the lecture circuit, such as Oliver Wendell Holmes, Henry Wadsworth Longfellow and Harriet Beecher Stowe, author of Uncle Tom's Cabin, a book whose anti-slavery message Leonowens had brought to the attention of the royal household. She said the book influenced Chulalongkorn's reform of slavery in Siam, a process he had begun in 1868, and which would end with its total abolition in 1915. Meanwhile, Louis had accumulated debts in the U.S. by 1874 and fled the country. He became estranged from his mother and did not see her for 19 years. In the summer of 1878, she taught Sanskrit at Amherst College.

== Canada and Germany ==
In 1878, Leonowens's daughter Avis Annie Crawford Connybeare married Thomas Fyshe, a Scottish banker and the cashier (general manager) of the Bank of Nova Scotia in Halifax, where she resided for nineteen years as she continued to travel the world. This marriage ended the family's money worries. Leonowens resumed her teaching career and taught daily from 9 am to 12 noon for an autumn half at the Berkeley School of New York at 252 Madison Avenue, Manhattan, beginning on 5 October 1880; this was a new preparatory school for colleges and schools of science and her presence was advertised in the press. On behalf of The Youth's Companion magazine, Leonowens visited Russia in 1881, shortly after the assassination of Tsar Alexander II, and other European countries, and continued to publish travel articles and books. This established her position as an orientalist scholar.

Having returned to Halifax, she again became involved in women's education and worked as a suffragist. She initiated a reading circle and a Shakespeare club, and she was one of the founders of the Local Council of Women of Halifax and the Victoria School of Art and Design (now the Nova Scotia College of Art and Design). From 1888 to 1893, Anna Leonowens lived with her daughter Avis and her grandchildren in Kassel, Germany.

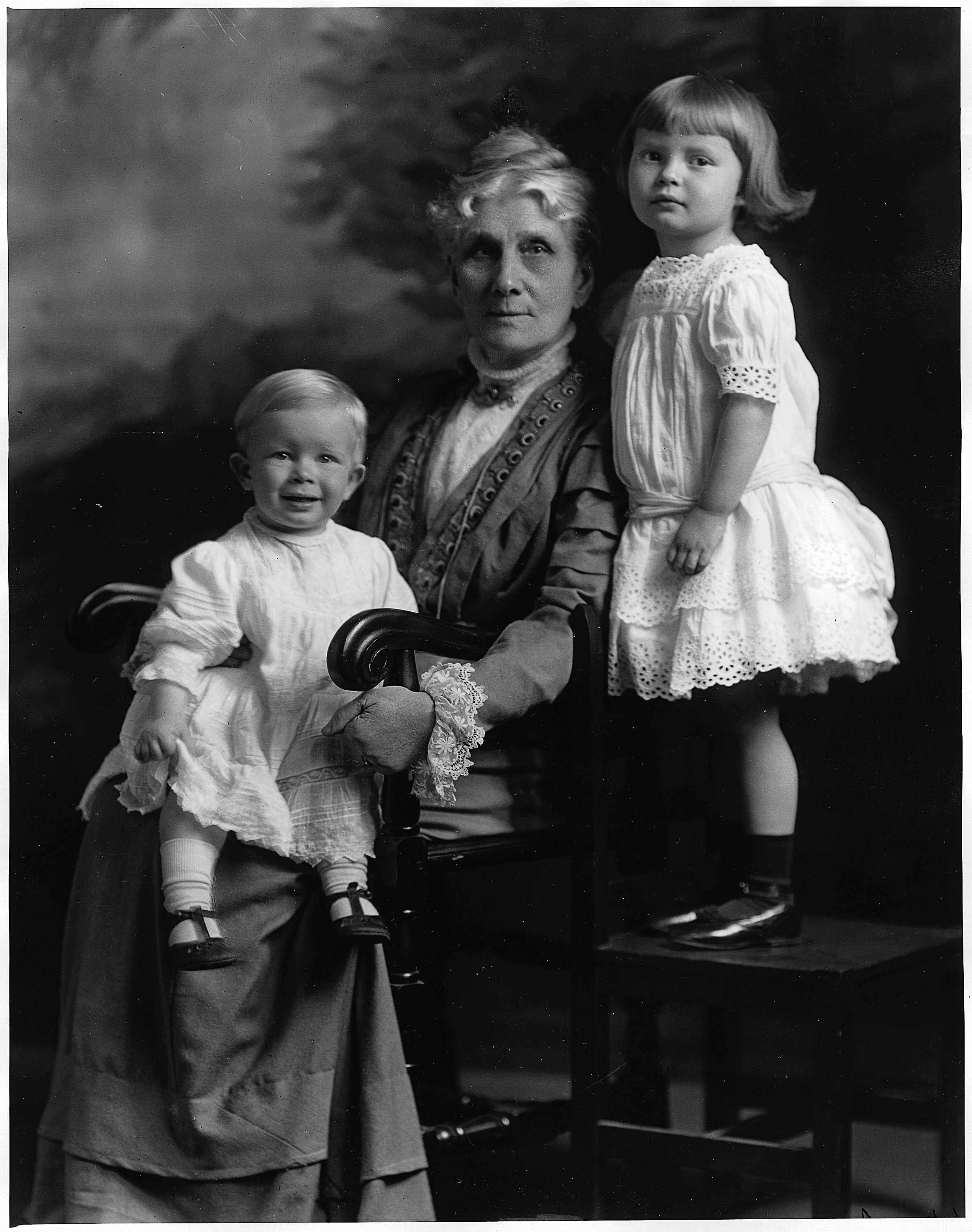
Leonowens in Montreal with two of her grandchildren

On her way back to Canada, she met her son Louis again, after nineteen years of separation. He had returned to Siam in 1881, having become an officer in the Siamese royal cavalry and a teak trader. From his marriage to Caroline Knox — a daughter of Sir Thomas George Knox, the British consul-general in Bangkok, and his Thai wife, Prang Yen— he had two children, aged two and five years. After the death of his wife, he entrusted them to his mother, who took them with her to Canada, while Louis returned to Siam.

Anna Leonowens met Chulalongkorn again when both visited London in 1897, thirty years after she had left Siam. During this audience, the king took the opportunity to express his thanks in person, but he also voiced his dismay at the inaccuracies in Leonowens's books. According to Leonowens's granddaughter Anna Fyshe, who had accompanied her, the king asked, "Why did you write such a wicked book about my father King Mongkut? You know that you have made him utterly ridiculous". In response, according to Fyshe, Leonowens insisted that she had written "the whole truth" and that Mongkut had indeed been "a ridiculous and a cruel, wicked man". With her granddaughter Anna, Leonowens stayed in Leipzig, Germany, until 1901. She studied Sanskrit and classical Indian literature with the renowned Indology professor Ernst Windisch of Leipzig University, while her granddaughter studied piano at the Royal Conservatory of Music.

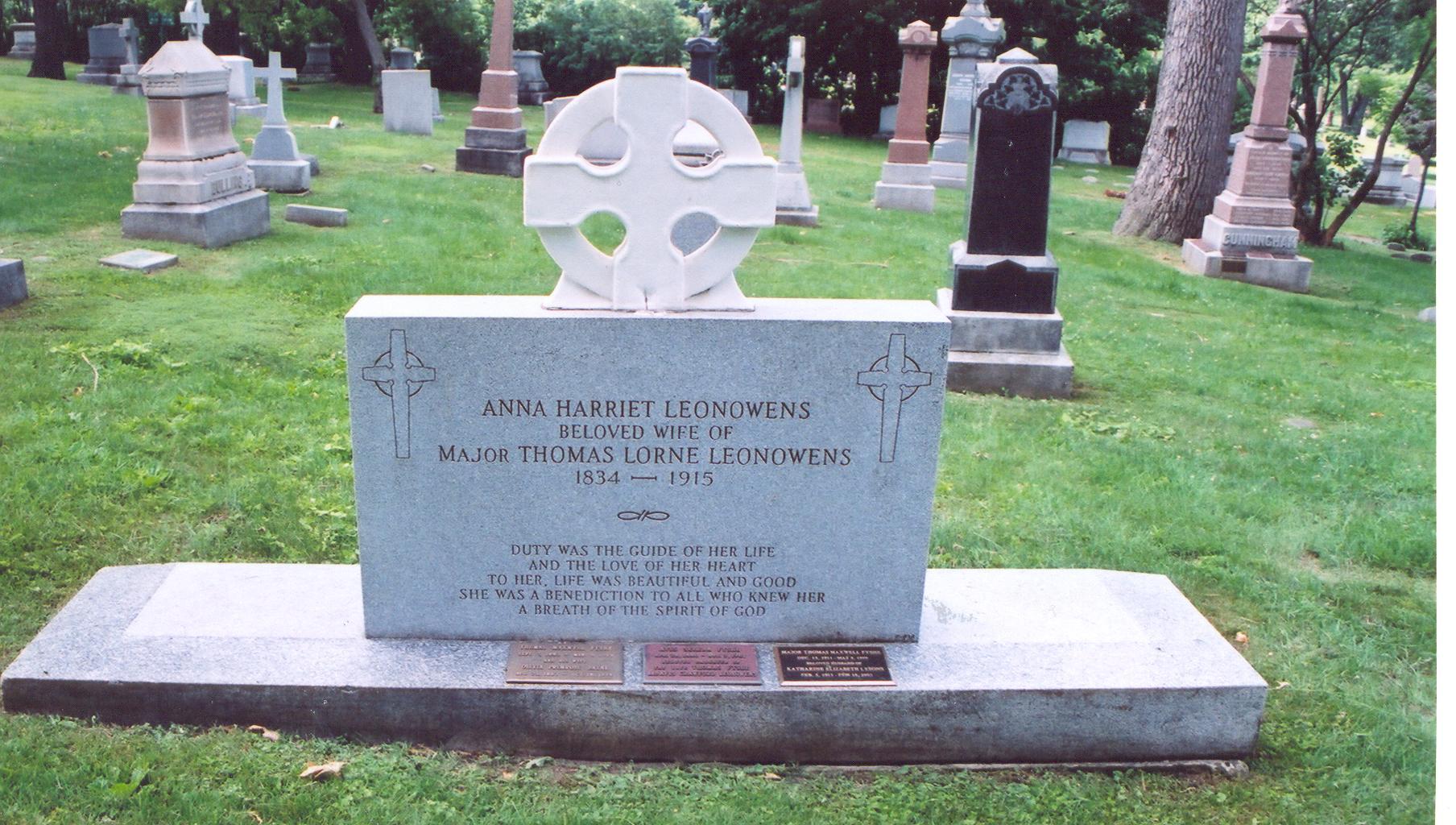
Anna Leonowens's grave at Mount Royal Cemetery, Montreal

In 1901 she moved to Montreal, Quebec, where she lectured Sanskrit at McGill University. She delivered her last lecture at the age of 78. Anna Leonowens died on 19 January 1915, at 83 years of age. She was interred in Mount Royal Cemetery in Montreal. The headstone identifies her as the "Beloved Wife of Major Thomas Lorne Leonowens", despite her husband never having risen beyond the rank of paymaster sergeant.

== In popular culture ==
Margaret Landon's novel Anna and the King of Siam (1944) provides a fictionalised look at Anna Leonowens's years at the royal court and develops the abolitionist theme that resonated with her American readership. In 1946, Talbot Jennings and Sally Benson adapted it into the screenplay for a dramatic film of the same name, starring Irene Dunne and Rex Harrison. In response, Thai authors Seni and Kukrit Pramoj wrote their own account in 1948 and sent it to American politician and diplomat Abbot Low Moffat (1901–1996), who drew on it for his biography Mongkut, the King of Siam (1961). Moffat donated the Pramoj brothers' manuscript to the Library of Congress in 1961.

Gertrude Lawrence (Anna) and Yul Brynner (king) in The King and I, 1951

Landon had, however, created the iconic image of Leonowens, and "in the mid-20th century she came to personify the eccentric Victorian female traveler". The novel was adapted as a hit musical by Rodgers and Hammerstein, The King and I (1951), starring Gertrude Lawrence and Yul Brynner, which ran 1,246 performances on Broadway and was also a hit in London and on tour. In 1956, a film version was released, with Deborah Kerr starring in the role of Leonowens and Brynner reprising his role as the king. Brynner starred in many revivals until his death in 1985.

The humorous depiction of Mongkut as a polka-dancing despot, as well as the king's and Anna's apparent romantic feelings for each other, is condemned as disrespectful in Thailand, where the Rodgers and Hammerstein film and musical were banned by the government. The 1946 film version of Anna and the King of Siam, starring Rex Harrison as Mongkut and Irene Dunne as Anna, was allowed to be shown in Thailand, although it was banned in newly independent India as an inaccurate insult by Westerners to an Eastern king. In 1950, the Thai government did not permit the film to be shown for the second time in Thailand. The books Romance in the Harem and An English Governess at the Siamese Court were not banned in Thailand. There were even Thai translations of these books by Ob Chaivasu, a Thai humor writer.

During a visit to the United States in 1960, the monarch of Thailand, King Bhumibol (a great-grandson of Mongkut), and his entourage explained that from what they could gather from the reviews of the musical, the characterisation of Mongkut seemed "90 percent exaggerated. My great-grandfather was really quite a mild and nice man." Years later, during her 1985 visit to New York, Bhumibol's wife, Queen Sirikit, went to see the Broadway musical at the invitation of Yul Brynner. The then ambassador of Thailand to the U.S. gave another reason for Thailand's disapproval of The King and I: its ethno-centric attitude and its barely hidden insult to the whole Siamese nation by portraying its people as childish and inferior to the Westerners.

In 1972, Twentieth Century Fox produced a non-musical American TV series for CBS, Anna and the King, with Samantha Eggar taking the part of Leonowens and Brynner reprising his role as the king. Margaret Landon charged the makers with "inaccurate and mutilated portrayals" of her literary property and sued unsuccessfully for copyright infringement. The series was not a success and was cancelled after only 13 episodes. In 1999 an animated film using the songs of the musical was released by Warner Bros. Animation. In the same year, Jodie Foster and Chow Yun-fat starred in a new feature-length cinematic adaptation of Leonowens's books, also titled Anna and the King. One Thai critic complained that the filmmakers had made Mongkut "appear like a cowboy"; this version was also banned by censors in Thailand.

Leonowens appears as a character in Paul Marlowe's novel Knights of the Sea, in which she travels from Halifax to Baddeck in 1887 to take part in a campaign to promote women's suffrage during a by-election.

== Later research ==
Leonowens kept the actual facts of her early life a closely guarded secret throughout her life, and never disclosed them to anybody, including her family. They were uncovered by researchers long after her death; their scrutiny began with her writings, especially following the popularity of the musical's 1956 film adaptation. D. G. E. Hall, writing in his 1955 book A History of South-East Asia, commented that Leonowens "was gifted with more imagination than insight", and from 1957 to 1961 A. B. Griswold published several articles and a monograph sharply criticizing her depictions of King Mongkut and Siam, writing that "she would seize on a lurid story that appealed to her... remove it from its context and transpose it to Bangkok in the 1860's; and... re-write it with a wealth of circumstantial detail". Moffat noted in his biography of King Mongkut that Leonowens "carelessly leaves proof of her transposed plagiarism".

The fact that Leonowens's claimed birth in Caernarfon was fabricated was first uncovered by W. S. Bristowe, an arachnologist and frequent visitor to Thailand, who was researching a biography of her son Louis. Bristowe failed to locate Louis's certificate of birth in London (as claimed by Anna), prompting further research that led to him identifying her origins in India. His findings were published in the 1976 book Louis and the King of Siam, and later writers have expanded on this line of research, including Leslie Smith Dow in Anna Leonowens: A Life Beyond The King and I (1991) and Susan Kepner in her 1996 paper "Anna (and Margaret) and the King of Siam". More recent full-length scholarly biographies by Susan Morgan (Bombay Anna, 2008) and Alfred Habegger (Masked: The Life of Anna Leonowens, Schoolmistress at the Court of Siam, 2014) brought widespread attention to Leonowens's actual life story.

== See also ==
- Reginald Johnston—the Scottish tutor to Aisin-Gioro Puyi the last emperor of China. His story was also dramatised in films such as The Last Emperor.
- Joseph Caulfield James—the English tutor to King Vajiravudh of Siam
- Katharine Carl—an American painter and author at the court of the Empress Dowager Cixi of China
- Maria Guyomar de Pinha—Siamese woman of mixed Japanese-Portuguese-Bengali ancestry credited for having introduced new dessert recipes in Siamese cuisine at the Ayutthaya court, some of them influenced by Portuguese cuisine.

== Sources ==
- Bristowe, W. S. Louis and the King of Siam, Chatto & Windus, 1976, ISBN 0-7011-2164-5
- Dow, Leslie Smith. Anna Leonowens: A Life Beyond The King and I, Pottersfield Press, 1992, ISBN 0-919001-69-6
- Habegger, Alfred (2014). Masked: The Life of Anna Leonowens, Schoolmistress at the Court of Siam. University of Wisconsin Press.
- Habegger, Alfred; Foley, Gerard (2010). Anna and Thomas Leonowens in Western Australia, 1853-1857 (PDF) (Report). Occasional Papers. State Records Office of Western Australia, Department of Culture and the Arts, Government of Western Australia. Archived from the original (PDF) on 18 March 2012.
- "Family Notices". Inquirer. Vol. 14, no. 717. Western Australia. 22 March 1854. p. 2 – via National Library of Australia.
- Morgan, Susan (2008). Bombay Anna: The Real Story and Remarkable Adventures of the King and I Governess. University of California Press. ISBN 978-0-520-25226-4.
- Seni Pramoj and Kukrit Pramoj. The King of Siam speaks ISBN 974-8298-12-4
- Warren, William (2002). "Who Was Anna Leonowens?". In O'Reilly, James; Habegger, Larry (eds.). Travelers' Tales, Thailand: True Stories. San Francisco: Travelers' Tales. ISBN 9781932361803.
