= Alma, Western Australia =

Alma
- Town
- Coordinates: 28°16′35″S 114°38′4″E
- Country: Australia
- State: Western Australia
- LGA(s): Shire of Northampton

Government
  - State electorate(s): Moore
  - Federal division(s): Durack

Area
  - Total: 342.2 km^{2} (132.1 sq mi)

Population
  - Total(s): 116 (SAL 2021)
- Postcode: 6535

Alma is a small town in the Mid West region of Western Australia. It is located in the Shire of Northampton.
