= The King and I (1956 film) =

1956 film by Walter Lang

- Theatrical release poster by Tom Chantrell
- Directed by: Walter Lang
- Screenplay by: Ernest Lehman
- Based on: The King and I 1951 musical by Richard Rodgers and Oscar Hammerstein II; Anna and the King of Siam 1944 novel by Margaret Landon
- Produced by: Charles Brackett
- Starring: Deborah Kerr; Yul Brynner; Rita Moreno; Martin Benson; Rex Thompson
- Cinematography: Leon Shamroy
- Edited by: Robert Simpson
- Music by: Richard Rodgers
- Distributed by: 20th Century-Fox
- Release date: June 28, 1956
- Running time: 133 minutes 144 minutes (with Overture, Entr'acte, and Exit Music)
- Country: United States
- Language: English
- Budget: $4.55 million
- Box office: $21.3 million

The King and I is a 1956 American musical film made by 20th Century-Fox, directed by Walter Lang and produced by Charles Brackett and Darryl F. Zanuck. The screenplay by Ernest Lehman is based on the 1951 Rodgers and Hammerstein musical The King and I, which is itself based on the 1944 novel Anna and the King of Siam by Margaret Landon. That novel in turn was based on memoirs written by Anna Leonowens, who became school teacher to the children of King Mongkut of Siam in the early 1860s. Leonowens' stories were autobiographical, although various elements of them have been called into question. The film stars Deborah Kerr and Yul Brynner.

The film was a critical and commercial success and was nominated for nine Academy Awards, winning five, including Best Actor for Brynner.

An animated film adaptation of the same musical was released in 1999. On February 12, 2021, Paramount Pictures and Temple Hill Entertainment announced that another live-action film version was in development.

== Plot ==
In 1862, a widowed schoolteacher, named Anna, arrives in Bangkok, capital of Siam, with her young son, Louis, after being summoned to tutor the many children of King Mongkut. Both are introduced to the intimidating Kralahome, Siam's prime minister, who escorts them to the Grand Palace, where they will live, although Anna had been promised her own house. The King ignores her objections and introduces her to his head wife, Lady Thiang. Anna also meets a recent concubine, a young Burmese, Tuptim, and the fifteen children she will tutor, including his son and heir, Prince Chulalongkorn. In conversation with the other wives, Anna learns Tuptim is in love with Lun Tha, who brought her to Siam.

Anna still wants her own house and teaches the children about the virtues of home life, to the irritation of the King, who disapproves of the influence of other cultures. She comes across Lun Tha and learns that he has been meeting Tuptim in secret. He asks her to arrange a rendezvous. The lovers meet under cover of darkness, and Lun Tha promises he will one day return to Siam and that they will escape together.

King Mongkut becomes troubled over rumors that the British regard him as a barbaric leader and are sending a delegation, including Anna's old admirer, Sir Edward, to possibly turn Siam into a protectorate. Anna persuades the King to receive them in European style by hosting a banquet with European food and music. In return, the King promises to give Anna her own house.

Sir Edward reminisces with Anna in an attempt to bring her back to British society. The King presents Tuptim's version of Uncle Tom's Cabin as a traditional Siamese ballet. However, the King and the Kralahome are not impressed, as the play involves slavery and shows the slaveholding King drowning in the river. During the show, Tuptim leaves the room to run away with Lun Tha.

After the guests have departed, the King reveals that Tuptim is missing. Anna explains that Tuptim is unhappy because she is just another woman in his eyes. The King retorts that men are entitled to a plenitude of wives, although women must remain faithful. Anna explains that a man should love only one woman and recalls her first dance before she teaches the King how to dance the polka. The touching moment is shattered when the Kralahome bursts into the room with the news Tuptim has been caught. For her dishonor, the King prepares to whip her despite Anna's pleas. When Anna declares he is indeed a barbarian, the King crumples and runs out of the room. The Kralahome blames Anna for ruining him, while Tuptim is led away in tears after learning Lun Tha was found dead and dumped into the river. This causes Anna to sever all ties as a governess and declare she will leave Siam on the next boat.

On the night of her departure, Anna imagines Tuptim singing 'getting to know you', when Louis tells her they'll be late for their boat. She then later finds out that the King is dying. Lady Thiang hands Anna the King's unfinished letter to her, stating his deep gratitude and respect for her despite their differences. Moments before the ship departs, he gives Anna his ring, as she has always spoken the truth to him, and persuades her and Louis to stay in Bangkok. He passes his title to Prince Chulalongkorn, who then issues a proclamation that states that all subjects will no longer bow down to him but will still respect him. The King dies, satisfied that his kingdom will be all right, and Anna lovingly presses her cheek to his hand.

== Cast ==
- Deborah Kerr as Anna Leonowens
- Yul Brynner as King Mongkut of Siam
- Rita Moreno as Tuptim
- Terry Saunders as Lady Thiang
- Martin Benson as Kralahome
- Rex Thompson as Louis Leonowens
- Patrick Adiarte as Prince Chulalongkorn
- Alan Mowbray as Sir John Hay
- Geoffrey Toone as Sir Edward Ramsay
- Carlos Rivas as Lun Tha
- Judy Dan as Royal Wife (uncredited)

=== Voice only ===
Three actors in the film had their singing voices dubbed by other people. The dubbed voices belonged to:

- Marni Nixon as Anna, for which she was paid $10,000
- Leona Gordon as Tuptim
- Reuben Fuentes as Lun Tha

== Musical numbers ==
- Overture – Played by the 20th Century-Fox Orchestra
- I Whistle a Happy Tune – Sung by Deborah Kerr (dubbed by Marni Nixon) and Rex Thompson
- The March of the Siamese Children – Played by the 20th Century-Fox Orchestra
- Hello, Young Lovers – Sung by Deborah Kerr (dubbed by Marni Nixon)
- A Puzzlement – Sung by Yul Brynner
- Getting to Know You – Sung by Deborah Kerr (dubbed by Marni Nixon) and Chorus
- We Kiss in a Shadow – Sung by Carlos Rivas (dubbed by Reuben Fuentes) and Rita Moreno (dubbed by Leona Gordon)
- Something Wonderful – Sung by Terry Saunders
- Finale, Act I – Sung by Yul Brynner and Chorus
- Entr'acte – Played by the 20th Century-Fox Orchestra
- The Small House of Uncle Thomas (Ballet) – Narrated by Rita Moreno, Sung and Danced by Chorus and Dancers
- Song of the King – Sung by Yul Brynner
- Shall We Dance? – Sung and Danced by Deborah Kerr (dubbed by Marni Nixon) and Yul Brynner
- Finale (Something Wonderful) – Sung by Chorus

== Production ==
The musical was written for Gertrude Lawrence, and her appearance in the film was contractually guaranteed. However, she was diagnosed with cancer while playing the role on Broadway and died during the run. Dinah Shore was considered for the role of Anna in the movie. Maureen O'Hara was originally cast, but Richard Rodgers did not agree to the casting. It was Yul Brynner who pressed for Deborah Kerr to play the role. Marni Nixon provided Kerr's singing for the film. Nixon and Kerr worked side-by-side in the recording studio for songs that combined speaking and singing. Nixon would also dub Kerr's singing the following year for the film An Affair to Remember.

Donald Bogle's biography of Dorothy Dandridge claims that Dandridge was offered the role of Tuptim in partial fulfillment of her three-picture contract with 20th Century-Fox, but that Dandridge allowed Otto Preminger (her lover and former director) to dissuade her because it was not the lead role. Rumors also circulated that Dandridge, as an African American, did not want to play a slave. Rita Moreno, who was under contract to Fox, was invited merely for a test, but impressed the producers enough to be selected for the part. Moreno later stated that France Nuyen was also considered for the part but was not cast because Nuyen was not a contract player with the studio.

Reprising their Broadway stage roles, Saunders plays Thiang, Adiarte plays Chulalongkorn and Benson plays the Kralahome, and dancers Yuriko and de Lappe also reprise their stage roles. Alan Mowbray appears in the new role of the British ambassador, while Sir Edward Ramsey (demoted to the ambassador's aide) is played by Geoffrey Toone. The cinematography was by Leon Shamroy, the art direction by John DeCuir and Lyle R. Wheeler and the costume design by Irene Sharaff. The choreography in the film was that which Jerome Robbins developed for the original stage production.

Three songs from the original stage production were recorded for, and appeared on, the film's soundtrack but do not appear in the motion picture: "Shall I Tell You What I Think of You?", "I Have Dreamed" and "My Lord and Master". "I Have Dreamed" and another song that was not used in the film, "Western People Funny", survive in the released film only as orchestral underscoring. In the film, the first half of the "Song of the King" was turned into ordinary spoken dialogue, with only some of the words sung, minus the king's opening lyrics, but it survives as it was actually written on the soundtrack album.

A special 50th-anniversary edition was released in 2006, which promised to restore the lost numbers, but it included only the audio and some still photographs for "Shall I Tell You?", casting doubt on the existence of footage of these numbers. An off-screen choral reprise of "Something Wonderful" was added to serve as the film's finale; the stage version ends with musical underscoring, but no singing. None of the other reprises of the songs were retained in the film version.

The film was one of the only two films shot in the new 55 mm CinemaScope 55 format, the other being Carousel, which was released several months earlier. Although the promotion for the film advertised that it was shot in CinemaScope 55, it was only released in the standard 35 mm CinemaScope format, with four-channel stereo audio instead of the six-channel stereo originally promised. CinemaScope 55 was never used or promoted again after this production, and Fox would later invest in Todd-AO and adopt its 65/70mm process, after changing it to the more conventional 24 frames/second, and contracting with Mitchell Camera for all-new FC ("Fox Camera") and BFC ("Blimped Fox Camera") cameras, and with Bausch & Lomb for all-new "Super Baltar" lenses. Numerous features were made in the Fox-revised Todd-AO process.

In 1961, it was rereleased for the first time in a 70 mm format, under Fox's "Grandeur 70" trademark. For this release, the six-channel version of the stereo soundtrack was finally used. In 1966, it was rereleased in CinemaScope before being sold to television in 1967.

== Reception ==
The film premiered at Grauman's Chinese Theatre in Hollywood and at New York's Roxy Theatre on June 28, 1956. The Hollywood premiere was a lavish gala benefit for the UCLA Medical Center attended by many celebrities and dignitaries, including King Mongkut's great-grandson Prince Surachatra.

In a his review in The New York Times the next day, critic Bosley Crowther praised the film effusively, writing:

Whatever pictorial magnificence 'The King and I'' may have had upon the stage—and, goodness knows, it had plenty, in addition to other things—it has twice as much in the film version ... [I]t is the pictorial magnificence of the appropriately regal production that especially distinguishes this film. Done with a taste in decoration and costuming that is forceful and rare, the whole thing has a harmony of the visuals that is splendid in excellent color and CinemaScope. ... If you don't go to see it, believe us, you'll be missing a grand and moving thing.

Reviewer Edwin Schallert of the Los Angeles Times called The King and I "a distinguished and courageous effort in film production" but questioned the effectiveness of the final scene and wrote: "I personally felt more than a shade of disappointment."

The film was a great success upon release, both critically and financially, becoming the fifth highest-grossing film of 1956 with rentals of $8.5 million. On Rotten Tomatoes, the film has a 93% approval rating based on reviews from 29 critics, with an average rating of 8.2/10.

In the later 1950s, Hollywood's film musicals had become less popular overseas. As The New York Times reported, "because of the difficulty of dubbing or subtitling song numbers, such American successes as 'Gigi' [1958] and 'Funny Face' [1957] were failures abroad, and the 'The King and I' was released in most foreign countries as a straight drama, with all the song numbers removed."

The King and I has been banned in Thailand because of its representation of King Mongkut. The same is the case with most other adaptations of Anna and the King.

== Awards and nominations ==
Award	Category	Nominee(s)	Result	Ref.
Academy Awards	Best Motion Picture	Charles Brackett	Nominated	
Academy Awards	Best Director	Walter Lang	Nominated	
Academy Awards	Best Actor	Yul Brynner	Won	
Academy Awards	Best Actress	Deborah Kerr	Nominated	
Academy Awards	Best Art Direction – Color	Art Direction: Lyle R. Wheeler and John DeCuir; Set Decoration: Walter M. Scott and Paul S. Fox	Won	
Academy Awards	Best Cinematography – Color	Leon Shamroy	Nominated	
Academy Awards	Best Costume Design – Color	Irene Sharaff	Won	
Academy Awards	Best Scoring of a Musical Picture	Alfred Newman and Ken Darby	Won	
Academy Awards	Best Sound Recording	Carlton W. Faulkner	Won	
Directors Guild of America Awards	Outstanding Directorial Achievement in Motion Pictures	Walter Lang	Nominated	
Golden Globe Awards	Best Motion Picture – Musical or Comedy		Won	
Golden Globe Awards	Best Actor in a Motion Picture – Musical or Comedy	Yul Brynner	Nominated	
Golden Globe Awards	Best Actress in a Motion Picture – Musical or Comedy	Deborah Kerr	Won	
Golden Globe Awards	Best Film Promoting International Understanding		Nominated	
National Board of Review Awards	Top Ten Films		3rd Place	
National Board of Review Awards	Best Actor	Yul Brynner (also for Anastasia and The Ten Commandments)	Won	
New York Film Critics Circle Awards	Best Actor	Yul Brynner	Nominated	
New York Film Critics Circle Awards	Best Actress	Deborah Kerr	Nominated	
New York Film Critics Circle Awards	Best Screenplay	Ernest Lehman	Nominated	
Photoplay Awards	Most Popular Male Star	Yul Brynner	Nominated	
Satellite Awards	Best Classic DVD	The King and I (as part of "The Rodgers & Hammerstein Box Set Collection")	Nominated	
Writers Guild of America Awards	Best Written American Musical	Ernest Lehman	Won	

=== American Film Institute ===
- AFI's 100 Years...100 Passions - #31
- AFI's 100 Years...100 Songs:
  - "Shall We Dance?" - #54
- AFI's 100 Years of Musicals - #11

== Soundtrack album ==
The film soundtrack album was first released on Capitol Records, supervised and conducted by Alfred Newman in association with Ken Darby. The album restored three songs recorded for the film but not included in the final release print: "My Lord and Master", "I Have Dreamed", and "Shall I Tell You What I Think of You?". The latter two were filmed, but no footage survives. Added to the original LP and CD releases of the film was a seven-minute overture not heard at the beginning of the film. The album was first issued only in mono in 1956, but, as with the Rodgers and Hammerstein films Oklahoma! (1955) and Carousel (1956), the sound on the film had been recorded in what was then state-of-the-art stereo, which made it possible, with the advent of stereo on records, for Capitol to release a stereo version of the soundtrack album in 1958. As with Oklahoma! and Carousel, the recording lathes of that time made it necessary for part of the album to be omitted in the stereo version, so half of "Getting to Know You" was cut in that edition.

The film soundtrack album of The King and I was issued on CD first by Capitol and then by Angel Records. The first two editions of the CD were exact duplicates of the LP, but in 2001, as with the Oklahoma! and Carousel soundtracks, Angel issued a new, expanded edition of the album, which not only featured all the songs (including the ballet "The Small House of Uncle Thomas"), but some of the film's incidental music, as well as the original main title music. The Overture heard on the LP version and on the first two editions of the CD was included as a bonus track.

== Planned remake ==
By 2021 Paramount Pictures acquired the rights to produce a new live-action film version of the musical, with Temple Hill Entertainment's Marty Bowen and Wyck Godfrey producing. Concord, who owns the Rodgers and Hammerstein catalog, is serving in a producing capacity.

== See also ==
- List of American films of 1956

== Bibliography ==
- Hischak, Thomas S. The Rodgers and Hammerstein Encyclopedia. Westport, Conn. :Greenwood Publishing Group, 2007. ISBN 9780313341403.
