= Anna and the King of Siam (novel) =

1944 semi-fictionalized biographical novel by Margaret Landon

- First edition
- Author: Margaret Landon
- Language: English
- Genre: biographical novel
- Publisher: John Day
- Publication date: 1944
- Publication place: United States
- Media type: Print (hardback & paperback)
- Pages: 391 pp
- LC Class: DS581 .L3

Anna and the King of Siam is a 1944 semi-fictionalized biographical novel by Margaret Landon.

In the early 1860s, Anna Leonowens, a widow with two young children, was invited to Siam (now Thailand) by King Mongkut (Rama IV), who wanted her to teach his children and wives the English language and introduce them to British customs. Her experiences during the five years she spent in the country served as the basis for two memoirs, The English Governess at the Siamese Court (1870) and Romance of the Harem (1872).

Landon took Leonowens' first-person narratives and added details about the Siamese people and their culture taken from other sources.

Anna and the King was also published as an Armed Services Edition, distributed to American troops during World War II.

== Adaptations ==
The book has been translated into dozens of languages, and has inspired at least six adaptations into various dramatic media:

- Anna and the King of Siam (1946 film)
- The King and I (1951 stage musical)
- The King and I (1956 film musical)
- Anna and the King (1972 TV series)
- The King and I (1999 animated film musical)
- Anna and the King (1999 film)

== Reception ==
At the time of its publication, The New York Times called it "an inviting escape into an unfamiliar, exotic past... calculated to transport us instantly". The Atlantic Monthly described it as "enchanting" and added that "the author wears her scholarship with grace, and the amazing story she has to tell is recounted with humor and understanding."
