= Margaret Landon =

American writer known for 'Anna and the King of Siam' (1903–1993)

- Born: Margaret Dorothea Mortenson; September 7, 1903; Somers, Wisconsin, U.S.
- Died: December 4, 1993 (aged 90); Alexandria, Virginia, U.S.
- Education: Wheaton College, Education (B.A., 1925)
- Occupations: Writer, Presbyterian missionary
- Spouse: Kenneth Landon
- Children: 4

Margaret Landon (September 7, 1903 – December 4, 1993) was an American writer known for Anna and the King of Siam, her best-selling 1944 novel of the life of Anna Leonowens which eventually sold over a million copies and was translated into more than twenty languages. In 1950, Landon sold the musical play rights to Richard Rodgers and Oscar Hammerstein II, who created the musical The King and I from her book. A later work, Never Dies the Dream, appeared in 1949.

== Life ==
Born Margaret Dorothea Mortenson to Annenus Duabus "A.D." and Adelle Johanna Mortenson (née Estburg) in Somers, Wisconsin, she was one of three daughters in a devout Methodist family. The family moved to Evanston, Illinois, where she graduated from Evanston Township High School in 1921.

Landon attended Wheaton College in Wheaton, Illinois, graduating in 1925. She taught at a school for a year, then married Kenneth Landon, whom she knew from Wheaton, and in 1927 they signed up as Presbyterian missionaries to Siam (Thailand).

Between 1927–37, Landon raised her first three children while running a mission school in Trang and read extensively about the country. During her readings, she learned about Anna Leonowens, the 19th Century governess to the Siamese royal family of Mongkut (Rama IV). When the Landon family returned to America in 1937, she soon began writing articles and then began researching material for a book on Leonowens.

Kenneth Landon returned to work on a PhD and wrote a book on Thai politics. With the outbreak of war, Thai ambassador Seni Pramoj refused to deliver his government's declaration of war on the grounds that the regent had not counter-signed it. Dr. Landon, as Washington's leading expert on Thailand, worked with the Office of Strategic Services and then with the Department of State to create the Free Thai resistance movement. Dr. Landon later donated hundreds of pages of transcripts of Free Thai radio broadcasts to the Library, along with a small but important collection of post-World War II Thai books on politics as well as Thai political fiction.

The couple's fourth child, Kenneth, Jr., was born in Washington, D.C., in 1943. He followed the lead of his parents and took up writing about his own field of interest, releasing God of Glory: The Promise of Relationship in 1992.

Margaret Landon was married 67 years. She died in Alexandria, Virginia, December 4, 1993, aged 90, leaving 13 grandchildren and 25 great-grandchildren. She is interred in Wheaton Cemetery in Illinois.

== Lawsuit over 1972 television series Anna and the King ==
In 1972, Twentieth Century Fox produced a non-musical television sitcom for CBS based on the film version of The King and I entitled Anna and the King, with Samantha Eggar taking the part of Anna Leonowens and Yul Brynner reprising his role as the king. The series was unsuccessful and was canceled after 13 episodes. Landon charged the producers with "inaccurate and mutilated portrayals" of her literary property and sued for copyright infringement. The suit initially failed in late 1974, but after the judgment was appealed, the parties chose to settle out of court, and a settlement was reached in 1975 with which Landon was satisfied.

== Bibliography ==
- Anna And The King of Siam (1944)
- Never Dies the Dream (1949)

== Citations ==
- Margaret and Kenneth Landon Papers (SC-38), Wheaton College Special Collections, Wheaton, Illinois
