= Something Wonderful =

Something Wonderful may refer to:

- "Something Wonderful" (song), a show tune from the Rodgers and Hammerstein musical The King and I
- Something Wonderful (Carmen McRae album), a 1963 album by Carmen McRae
- Something Wonderful (Nancy Wilson album), a 1960 album by Nancy Wilson
- Something Wonderful, a 1996 album by Bryn Terfel
- Something Wonderful, a novel by Judith McNaught
- "Something Wonderful", a song on the Revolting Cocks album Beers, Steers, and Queers
