= The King and I (original cast recording) =

The original cast recording album sleeve

The original cast recording of The King and I was issued in 1951 on Decca Records, with Gertrude Lawrence, Yul Brynner, Dorothy Sarnoff and Doretta Morrow. The musical premiered on Broadway in 1951, and Anna was Lawrence's last stage role. The Broadway cast recording was directed by John Van Druten, with orchestrations by Robert Russell Bennett and musical director Frederick Dvonch.

Theatre writer John Kenrick admires the recording for the performances of the secondary couple, Douglas and Morrow, and for the warmth of Lawrence's performance. He notes that "Shall We Dance" was abridged, and there are no children's voices – the chorus in "Getting to Know You" is made up of adults. In 2000, the recording was inducted into the Grammy Hall of Fame. Later in the same year Patrice Munsel and Robert Merrill made the first studio recording of selections from the musical. A studio recording of selections sung by Patrice Munsel, Robert Merrill and Dinah Shore followed, later in 1951, and the London cast recording album followed two years later. The 1956 film starred Brynner and Deborah Kerr, but Marni Nixon dubbed Kerr's vocals in the soundtrack album.

== Track listing ==
1. Overture
2. "I Whistle a Happy Tune"; Gertrude Lawrence
3. "My Lord and Master"; Doretta Morrow
4. "Hello Young Lovers"; Gertrude Lawrence
5. "March of the Siamese Children"; orchestra
6. "A Puzzlement"; Yul Brynner
7. "Getting to Know You"; Gertrude Lawrence with chorus
8. "We Kiss in a Shadow"; Doretta Morrow and Larry Douglas
9. "Shall I Tell You What I Think of You?"; Gertrude Lawrence
10. "Something Wonderful"; Dorothy Sarnoff
11. "I Have Dreamed"; Doretta Morrow and Larry Douglas
12. "Shall We Dance?"; Gertrude Lawrence and Yul Brynner
