= Fanny Holtzmann =

American lawyer

Fanny E. Holtzmann (1902–1980) was a pioneering female lawyer in the motion picture and theatre industry. Born in the borough of Brooklyn in New York City, she was influenced by her immigrant grandfather, a Talmudic scholar who introduced her to the study of law.

Although she dropped out of high school at the end of her junior year, Holtzmann studied law in night school at Fordham University and earned her degree in 1922. The following year she rented an office in the Broadway Theater District and opened for business immediately after placing third in the New York bar exam. She numbered Edmund Goulding and William Randolph Hearst among her earliest clients.

Holtzmann gained international fame during a 1934 libel trial in London in which she represented Princess Irina Alexandrovna of Russia, who contended that the Metro-Goldwyn-Mayer film Rasputin and the Empress (1932) had misrepresented her relationship with Rasputin. Her client was awarded $125,000 in damages for the showing of the film in the UK, and eventually she won a large settlement for its release in other countries as well.

In the 1930s, Holtzmann helped Eastern European Jews emigrate to the United States, and following World War II she assisted Jewish refugees. At the founding conference of the United Nations in 1945, she served as counsel to the Republic of China, and assisted China in becoming a permanent member of the U.N. Security Council. She also worked to gain the support of many countries for the admission of Israel into the United Nations.

In 1950, Holtzmann was looking for a new property for her client Gertrude Lawrence when the 1944 Margaret Landon book Anna and the King of Siam was sent to her by the William Morris agent who represented the author. He thought a stage adaptation of the book would be an ideal vehicle for the actress. Holtzmann agreed, but proposed a musical version would be better. She sent the book to Richard Rodgers and Oscar Hammerstein II after Cole Porter declined to write the score, and the two men agreed to write what ultimately became The King and I.

Holtzmann's friends and clients included Louis B. Mayer, Fred Astaire, Clifton Webb, Noël Coward, Danny Kaye, King George V, the Romanoff family, New York City mayor Jimmy Walker, Winston Churchill, King George II of Greece, Dwight Eisenhower, Adlai Stevenson, and Eleanor Roosevelt.

Holtzmann was awarded an honorary Doctor of Humane Letters from the Hebrew Union College-Jewish Institute of Religion three weeks before her death from cancer.

== Additional sources ==
- Women's Legal History Biography Project at Stanford University
- HistoryPortrait.com
