= Na-Young Jeon =

Dutch-South Korean actress and singer

- 전나영
- Born: The Hague, Netherlands
- Occupations: Actress; singer

Korean name
- Hangul: 전나영
- RR: Jeon Nayeong
- MR: Chŏn Nayŏng

Na-Young Jeon is a Dutch-South Korean actress and singer, best known for her musical theatre work.

== Early life and education ==
Born and raised in The Netherlands, Na-Young Jeon studied piano from the age of four and was involved in many productions of AlbA Theaterhuis in her hometown The Hague.

During her training at the Musical Theater Academy, Codarts in Rotterdam, she played leading roles in musical theatre productions. Credits include Kelsi in High School Musical (for which she got nominated for a John Kraaijkamp Musical Award in the category "Upcoming talent", and Kim in Miss Saigon (the revival).

== Career ==
She appeared in the Musical Awards Gala TV Show performing "Sun and Moon" as Kim, live on Dutch television. Also her performance of "Last night of the world" during the annual Uitmarkt in Amsterdam was shown live on Dutch television.

In June 2014 she portrayed the role of Fantine in Les Misérables at the Queen's Theatre in London's West End. For this she was nominated for a Broadwayworld UK / West End Award in the category Best Performance in a Long-running West End Show. She also reprised the role of Fantine in the revival of Les Misérables in Korea and The Arena World Tour Spectacular in Singapore.

In July 2017, she played the leading role of Meng Jiang Nü in the new musical The Great Wall: One Woman's Journey in Singapore. It was directed by Darren Yap and composed by David Shrubsole. In 2018, she played Tuptim in The King and I in the West End.

Her notable screen credits include Pong in the series Conny & Clyde (VTM, Antwerp), and the title role in Akiko (Nps Kort!, nominated Gouden Kalf, best short film).

== Filmography ==
Year	Title	Role	Notes/Ref.
2008	High School Musical on Stage!	Kelsi Nielsen	Recording
2008	Akiko	Akiko	Short film
2010	Hitomi	Hitomi	Short film
2010	Van Hier Tot Tokio	Bo	Series
2013	Connie & Clyde	Pong	5 episodes
2016	The Calling	Girl	Short film
2016	Miss Saigon 25th Anniversary	Gigi	Recording
2018	The King and I	Tuptim	Recording

== Stage ==
Year	Title	Role	Notes/Ref.
2009	High School Musical on Stage!	Kelsi Nielsen	Tilburg
2011	Miss Saigon	Kim	Dutch Revival
2012	Kiss Me, Kate	Bianca	Theatre M-Lab, Amsterdam
2013–2014	Les Misérables	Fantine	Queen's Theatre, London
2015–2016	Les Misérables	Fantine	Blue Square Theatre, Seoul
2016	Notre Dame de Paris	Esmeralda	Korea Revival Tour
2017	The Great Wall Musical: One Woman's Journey	Lady Meng Jiang Nü	Drama Centre, Singapore
2017	Miss Saigon	Gigi	UK Tour
2018	The King and I	Tuptim	London Palladium Revival, London
2019–2022	Aida	Aida	Blue Square Interpark Hall, Seoul
2020–2023	Rent	Maureen Johnson	D-cube Arts Center, Seoul
2023	Miss Saigon	Gigi	Copenhagen
2024	Zorro	Luisa	Korea Revival Tour
2026	Les Misérables The Arena World Tour Spectacular	Fantine	Singapore
