= Joan Almedilla =

Filipino singer and actress

- Born: Joan Richelle C. Almedilla; September 19, 1973 (age 53); Cebu City, Philippines
- Other name: Kim
- Occupations: International Filipino singer and theater actress
- Years active: 1995–present
- Spouse: Charles Uy
- Awards: Champion, Best of Cebu Pop Music Festival (January 1993); Most Perfect Voice Music Mate Star (1989)

Joan Richelle C. Almedilla (born September 19, 1973) is a film and theater actress, composer, and singer who has starred as Kim in the Broadway musical Miss Saigon.

== Life and career ==
Almedilla was born to Agapito and Rosario, whose roots are from Bohol and Cebu in the Philippines.

According to an interview by AsianWeek on June 1, 2000, Almedilla, who wanted to sing, did not want to be an actress. As a child, she enjoyed competing in vocal talent contests in the Philippines.

Almedilla moved to the United States in 1993 to pursue a college education and studied voice. Her first role was Kim in the Broadway production of Miss Saigon (1995–1997). She then moved on to portray the role of Fantine on the Third National Tour of Les Misérables (1999–2000 and 2005–2006). Almedilla is the first Filipino to play the role of Fantine. Her other credits include: Soul Girl in the Broadway National Tour of Jesus Christ Superstar (2002–2004); and Woman in Songs for a New World (2005) at the Rubicon Theater, which had been nominated for several Ovation Awards including Best Ensemble Cast.

In 2007, Almedilla starred as Imelda Marcos in Here Lies Love, opposite David Byrne at Carnegie Hall's main theater, the Stern Auditorium/Perelman Stage, with nearly 3,000 music patrons and enthusiasts in attendance. Almedilla recited two poems ("Wonderment" and "A Hill in the Land of Moriah") composed by Pope John Paul II to the United Nations. She played the role of Himiko Hamilton, the lead in Tea, with Music at East West Players.

In 2016, Almedilla joined Lincoln Center's North American tour of The King and I as Lady Thiang, directed by Tony Award Winner Bartlett Sher. Her son went on to play one of the Royal Twins.

She has directed several fundraisers including: Hope for a New World (benefiting the victims of tsunami disasters in South Asia) and Give a Child Hope (together with Places Please and World Vision to benefit The Children of Rwanda).

Almedilla supports Broadway Cares: Equity Fights Aids, and The Leukemia & Lymphoma Society.

== Personal life ==
Almedilla is married to Filipino-American film director Charles Uy.

Almedilla's son CJ Uy plays one of the Royal Children in the 2016 North American tour of The King and I.

== Theater ==
Her theater work includes:

- Les Misérables (as Fantine) National Tour
- Miss Saigon (as Kim) Broadway
- King and I (Lady Thiang) National Tour
- Criers for Hire (as Baby)
- Krunk Fu Battle Battle (as Jean Lee)
- Songs for a New World
- Jesus Christ Superstar (Soul Girl/ Magdelene Us.)
- It's Only Life
- Tea, with Music (Himiko Hamilton)

== Film ==
- Commencement
- Ramona
- The Speed Walker

== Plays ==
- Que Platon
- PeregriNasyon
- Making Tracks
- Seer from Saigon

== Recordings ==
- Stage 3: True Colors (Featured Artist)
- Joan A. (Solo Artist)

== Solo concerts ==
- Journeys of My Heart
- September Songs
- Simply Joan

== Awards ==
- Perlas Awards - Philippine Foundation, Cebu City
- Certificate of Recognition in the field of Performing Arts - Bohol Circle of Eastern, USA (1998, 2000)
- Apollo Awards for Best of Apollo Nights (1994)
- Champion, Best of Cebu Pop Music Festival (January 1993)
- Most Perfect Voice Music Mate Star (1989)
- Regional Champion, Music Mate Star (Cebu City) (1989)

== See also ==
- Filipinos in the New York City metropolitan region
