= Sean Ghazi =

Malaysian actor, singer and dancer (born 1969)

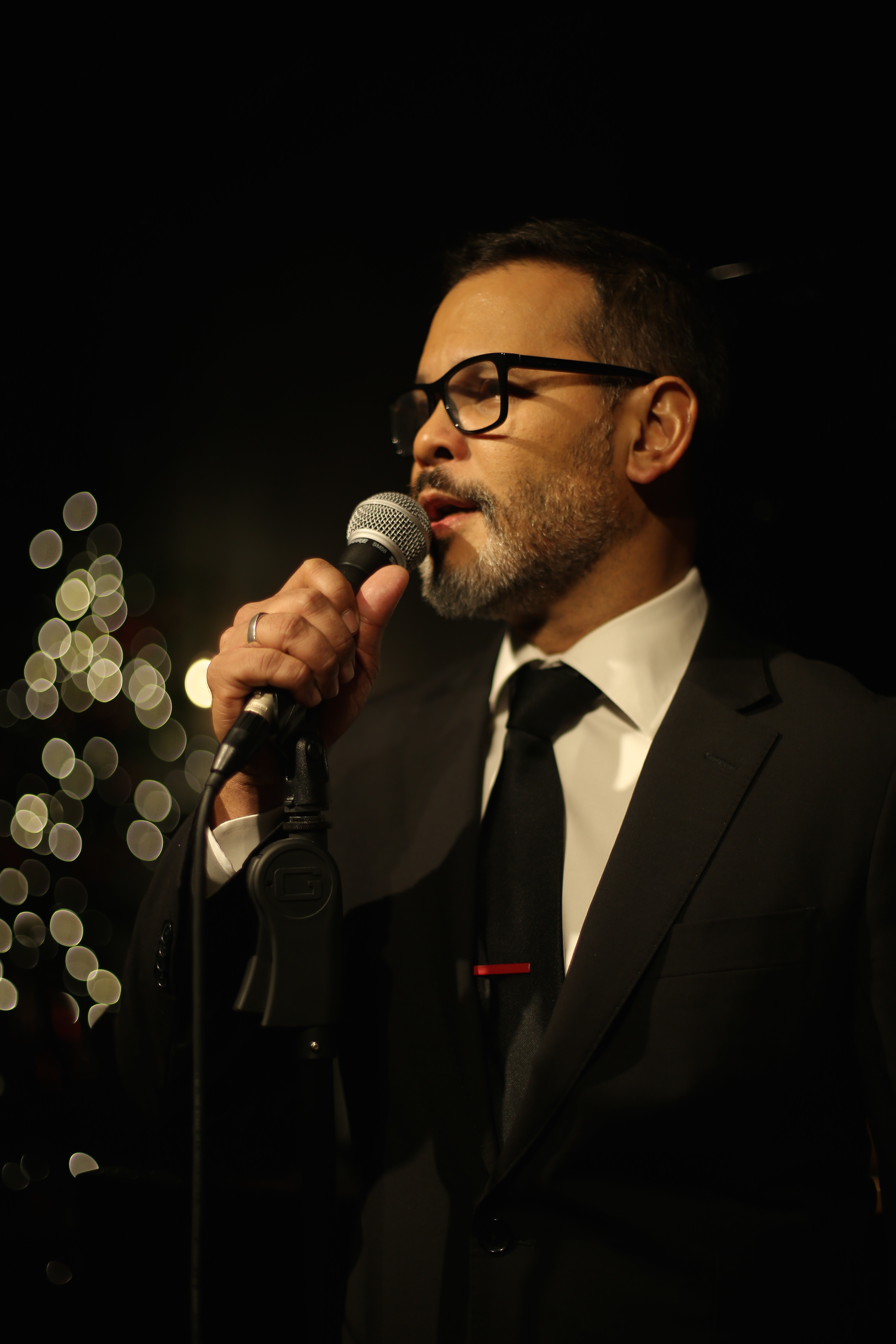

Background information
- Born: Sean William Ghazi; 4 April 1969 (age 56)
- Origin: Malaysia
- Genres: Classical, Pop
- Occupation(s): Actor, Dancer, Singer, Composer

Sean William Ghazi (born 4 April 1969, in Kuala Lumpur, Malaysia) is a Malaysian actor, singer and dancer.

== Career ==
Ghazi is best known for appearing in the 1999 movie Anna and the King(in the role of Balat), alongside Jodie Foster and Chow Yun-fat. He has appeared on stage in London's West End and in Europe, in productions such as Miss Saigon, Rent and The King and I. He has also appeared in several television and theatre productions in Asia.

In 2006, Ghazi released his first music album, Semalam, which features jazzed-up versions of classic Malay songs. One of the album's feature songs "Ku Impikan Bintang", a Malay-language rendition of Pink Martini's "Let's Never Stop Falling in Love", became a popular hit. The album earned Ghazi the 'Best New Artiste' award at the Anugerah Industri Muzik at the same year..

In 1995, Ghazi won a nationally-televised talent competition in Singapore called the Fame Awards.

Ghazi was educated at the United World College of South East Asia in Singapore, Emerson College in Boston, and Laine Theatre Arts in London.

== Filmography ==
Year	Title	Role	Notes
1998	Idaman	Khalid	TV series
1999	Anna and the King	Khun Phra Balat	
2013	C.O.G	Paul	
2022	Split Gravy on Rice	Husni	

== Discography ==
- Sean Ghazi Semalam (2006)

== Awards ==
=== Anugerah Industri Muzik ===
- 2006: Best New Artiste

== Theatre Works ==
- P. Ramlee – The Musical (2007)
