= The King and I =

Musical by Rodgers and Hammerstein, premiered in 1951

- Original Broadway poster (1951)
- Music: Richard Rodgers
- Lyrics: Oscar Hammerstein II
- Book: Oscar Hammerstein II
- Basis: Anna and the King of Siam by Margaret Landon
- Productions: 1951 Broadway; 1953 West End; 1954 U.S. tour; 1973 West End revival; 1977 Broadway revival; 1979 West End revival; 1981 U.S. tour; 1985 Broadway revival; 1996 Broadway revival; 1998 U.S. tour; 2000 West End revival; 2002 U.K. tour; 2004 U.S. tour; 2011 U.K. tour; 2015 Broadway revival; 2016 U.S. tour; 2018 West End revival; 2023 U.K. tour; 2024 West End revival
- Awards: 1952 Tony Award for Best Musical; 1996 Tony Award for Best Revival of a Musical; 2015 Tony Award for Best Revival of a Musical

The King and I is the fifth musical by the team of Rodgers and Hammerstein. It is based on Margaret Landon's novel Anna and the King of Siam (1944), which is in turn derived from the memoirs of Anna Leonowens, governess to the children of King Mongkut of Siam in the early 1860s. The musical's plot relates the experiences of Anna, a British schoolteacher who is hired as part of the King's drive to modernize his country. The relationship between the King and Anna is marked by conflict through much of the piece, as well as by a love to which neither can admit. The musical premiered on March 29, 1951, at Broadway's St. James Theatre. It ran for nearly three years, making it the fourth-longest-running Broadway musical in history at the time, and has had many tours and revivals.

In 1950, theatrical attorney Fanny Holtzmann was looking for a part for her client, veteran leading lady Gertrude Lawrence. Holtzmann realized that Landon's book would provide an ideal vehicle and contacted Rodgers and Hammerstein, who were initially reluctant but agreed to write the musical. The pair initially sought Rex Harrison to play the supporting part of the King, a role he had played in the 1946 film made from Landon's book, but he was unavailable. They settled on the young actor and television director Yul Brynner.

The musical was an immediate hit, winning Tony Awards for Best Musical, Best Actress (for Lawrence) and Best Featured Actor (for Brynner). Lawrence died unexpectedly of cancer a year and a half after the opening, and the role of Anna was played by several actresses during the remainder of the Broadway run of 1,246 performances. A hit West End London run and U.S. national tour followed, together with the 1956 film for which Brynner won the Academy Award for Best Actor, and the musical was recorded several times. In later revivals, Brynner came to dominate his role and the musical, starring in a four-year national tour culminating in a 1985 Broadway run shortly before his death.

Christopher Renshaw directed major revivals on Broadway (1996), winning the Tony Award for Best Revival, and in the West End (2000). A 2015 Broadway revival won another Tony for Best Revival. Both professional and amateur revivals of The King and I continue to be staged regularly throughout the English-speaking world.

== Historical background ==
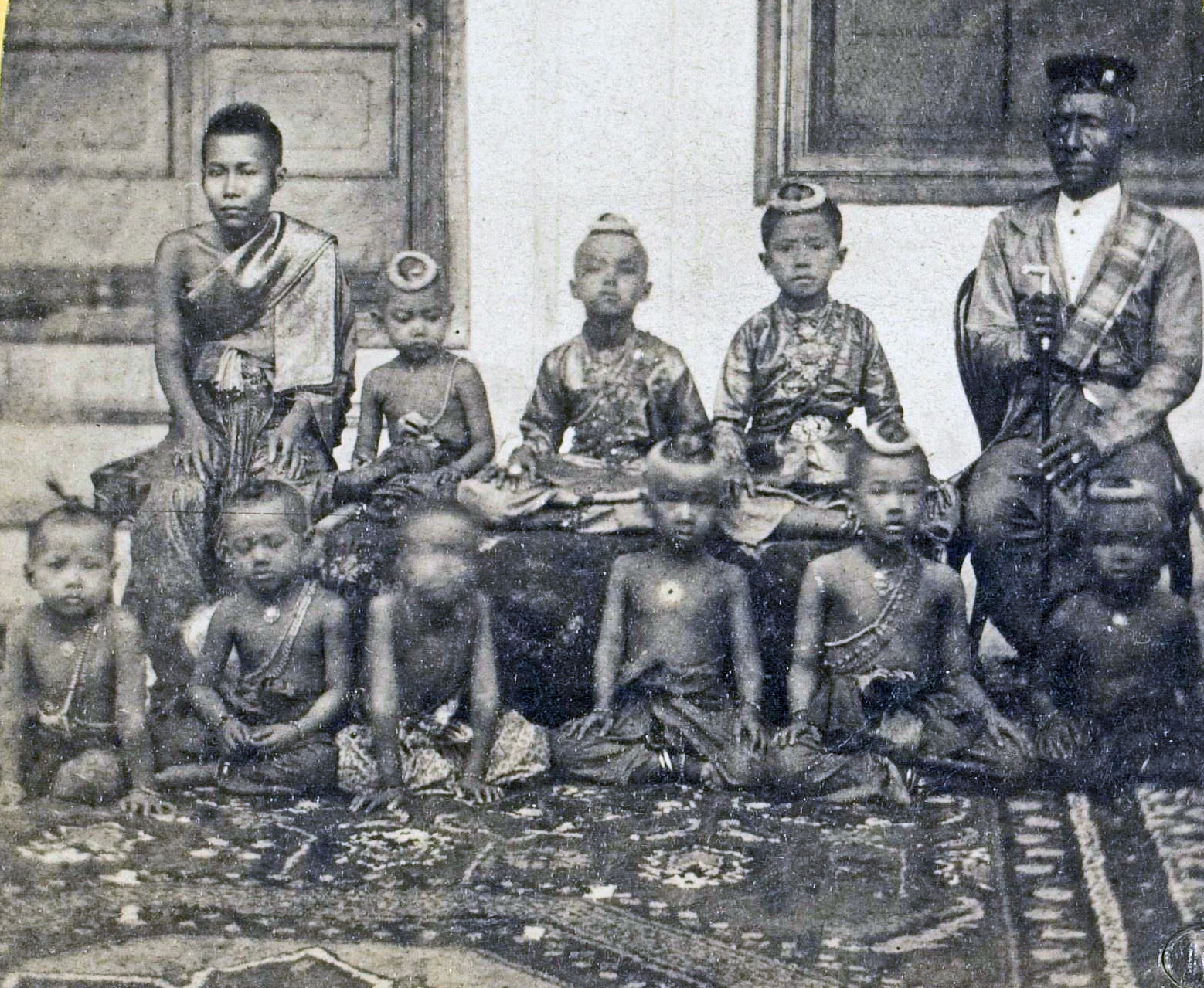
King Mongkut (far right) with his heir Chulalongkorn seated next to him and some of his other children. A wife is seated at left.

Mongkut, King of Siam, was about 57 years old in 1861. He had lived half his life as a Buddhist monk, was an able scholar, and founded a new order of Buddhism and a temple in Bangkok (paid for by his half-brother, King Nangklao). Through his decades of devotion, Mongkut acquired an ascetic lifestyle and a firm grasp of Western languages. When Nangklao died in 1850, Mongkut became king. At that time, various European countries were striving for dominance, and American traders sought greater influence in Southeast Asia. He ultimately succeeded in keeping Siam an independent nation, partly by familiarizing his heirs and harem with Western ways.

In 1861, Mongkut wrote to his Singapore agent, Tan Kim Ching, asking him to find a British lady to be governess to the royal children. At the time, the British community in Singapore was small, and the choice fell on a recent arrival there, Anna Leonowens (1831–1915), who was running a small nursery school in the colony. Leonowens was the Anglo-Indian daughter of an Indian Army soldier and the widow of Thomas Owens, a clerk and hotel keeper. She had arrived in Singapore two years previously, claiming to be the genteel widow of an officer and explaining her dark complexion by stating that she was Welsh by birth. Her deception was not detected until long after her death, and had still not come to light when The King and I was written.

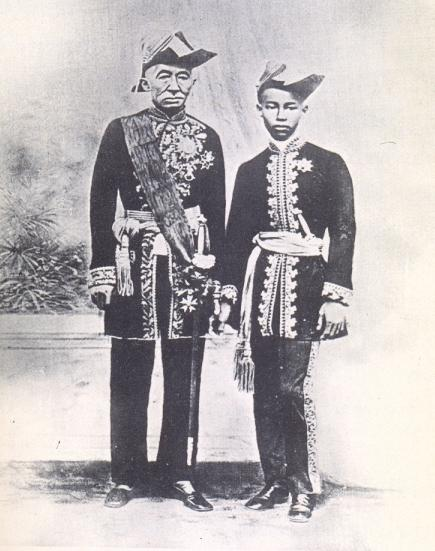
Mongkut with Chulalongkorn, dressed in naval uniforms

Upon receiving the King's invitation, Leonowens sent her daughter, Avis, to school in England, to give Avis the social advantage of a prestigious British education, and traveled to Bangkok with her five-year-old son, Louis. King Mongkut had sought a Briton to teach his children and wives after trying local missionaries, who used the opportunity to proselytize. Leonowens initially asked for $150 in Singapore currency per month. Her additional request, to live in or near the missionary community to ensure she was not deprived of Western company, aroused suspicion in Mongkut, who cautioned in a letter, "we need not have teacher of Christianity as they are abundant here". King Mongkut and Leonowens came to an agreement: $100 per month and a residence near the royal palace. At a time when most transport in Bangkok was by boat, Mongkut did not wish to have to arrange for the teacher to get to work every day. Leonowens and Louis temporarily lived as guests of Mongkut's prime minister, and after the first house offered was found to be unsuitable, the family moved into a brick residence (wooden structures decayed quickly in Bangkok's climate) within walking distance of the palace.

In 1867, Leonowens took a six-month leave of absence to visit her daughter Avis in England, intending to deposit Louis at a school in Ireland and return to Siam with Avis. However, due to unexpected delays and opportunities for further travel, Leonowens was still abroad in late 1868, when Mongkut fell ill and died. Leonowens did not return to Siam, although she continued to correspond with her former pupil, the new king Chulalongkorn.

== Creation ==
In 1950, British actress Gertrude Lawrence's business manager and attorney, Fanny Holtzmann, was looking for a new vehicle for her client when the 1944 Margaret Landon novel Anna and the King of Siam (a fictionalized version of Leonowens' experiences) was sent to her by Landon's agent. According to Rodgers biographer Meryle Secrest, Holtzmann was worried that Lawrence's career was fading. The 51-year-old actress had appeared only in plays, not in musicals, since Lady in the Dark closed in 1943. Holtzmann agreed that a musical based on Anna and the King of Siam would be ideal for her client, who purchased the rights to adapt the novel for the stage.

Holtzmann initially wanted Cole Porter to write the score, but he declined. She was going to approach Noël Coward next, but happened to meet Dorothy Hammerstein (Oscar's wife) in Manhattan. Holtzmann told Dorothy Hammerstein that she wanted Rodgers and Hammerstein to create a show for Lawrence, and asked her to see that her husband read a book that Holtzmann would send over. In fact, both Dorothy Rodgers and Dorothy Hammerstein had read the novel in 1944 and had urged their husbands to consider it as a possible subject for a musical. Dorothy Hammerstein had known Gertrude Lawrence since 1925, when they had both appeared in André Charlot's London Revue of 1924 on Broadway and on tour in North America.

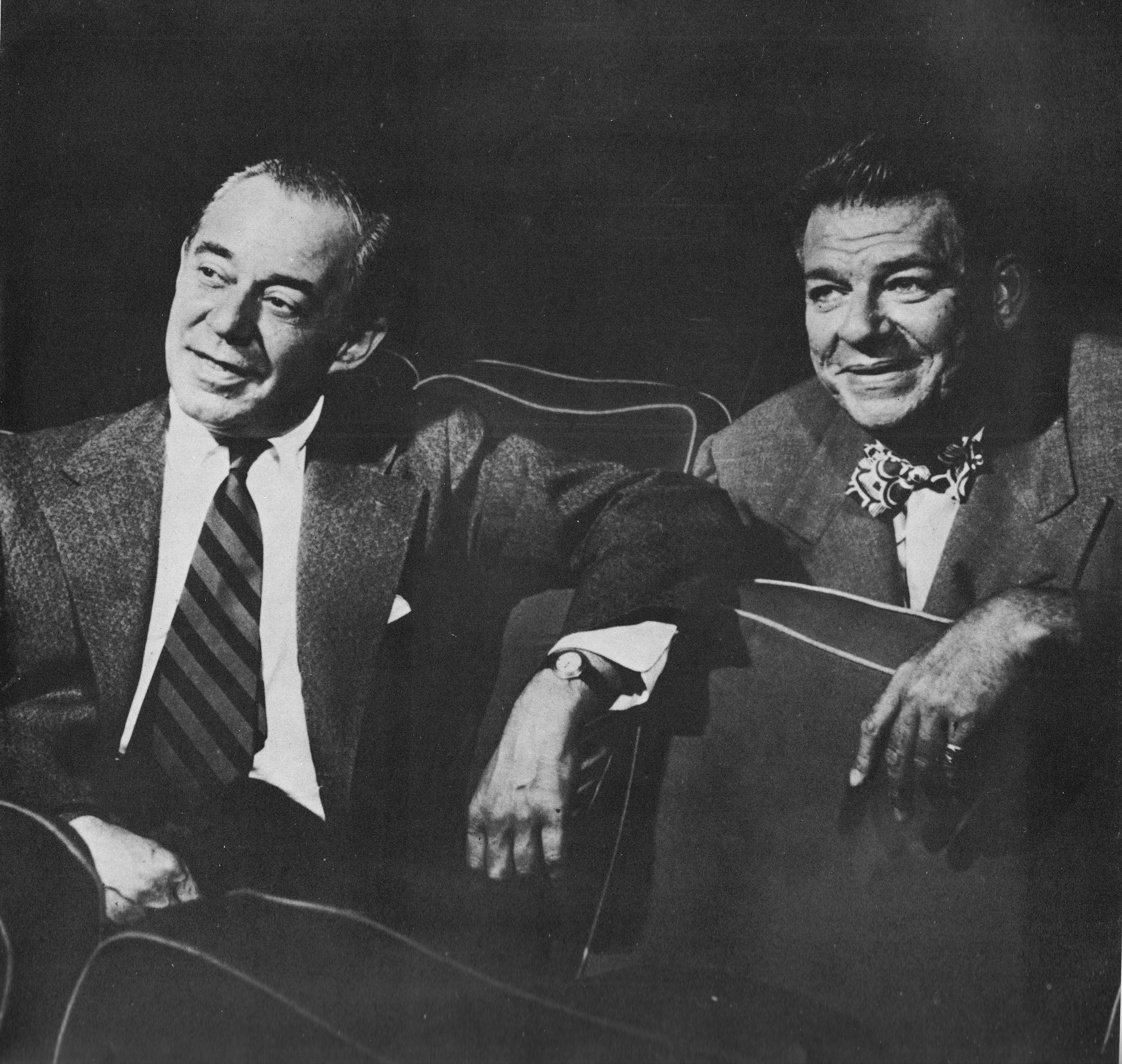
Rodgers (left) and Hammerstein

Rodgers and Hammerstein had disliked Landon's novel as a basis for a musical when it was published, and their views still held. It consists of vignettes of life at the Siamese court, interspersed with descriptions of historical events unconnected with each other, except that the King creates most of the difficulties in the episodes, and Anna tries to resolve them. Rodgers and Hammerstein could see no coherent story from which a musical could be made until they saw the 1946 film adaptation, starring Irene Dunne and Rex Harrison, and how the screenplay united the episodes in the novel. Rodgers and Hammerstein were also concerned about writing a star vehicle. They had preferred to make stars rather than hire them, and engaging the legendary Gertrude Lawrence would be expensive. Lawrence's voice was also a worry: her limited vocal range was diminishing with the years, while her tendency to sing flat was increasing. Lawrence's temperament was another concern: though she could not sing like one, the star was known to be capable of diva-like behavior. In spite of this, they admired her acting – what Hammerstein called her "magic light", a compelling presence on stage – and agreed to write the show. For her part, Lawrence committed to remaining in the show until June 1, 1953, and waived the star's usual veto rights over cast and director, leaving control in the hands of the two authors.

Hammerstein found his "door in" to the play in Landon's account of a slave in Siam writing about Abraham Lincoln. This would eventually become the narrated dance, "The Small House of Uncle Thomas". Since a frank expression of romantic feelings between the King and Anna would be inappropriate in view of both parties' upbringing and prevailing social mores, Hammerstein wrote love scenes for a secondary couple, Tuptim, a junior wife of the King, and Lun Tha, a scholar. In the Landon work, the relationship is between Tuptim and a priest, and is not romantic. The musical's most radical change from the novel was to have the King die at the end of the musical. Also, since Lawrence was not primarily a singer, the secondary couple gave Rodgers a chance to write his usual "soaring" romantic melodies. In an interview for The New York Times, Hammerstein indicated that he wrote the first scene before leaving for London and the West End production of Carousel in mid-1950; he wrote a second scene while there.

The pair had to overcome the challenge of how to represent Thai speech and music. Rodgers, who had experimented with Asian music in his short-lived 1928 musical with Lorenz Hart titled Chee-chee, did not wish to use actual Thai music, which American audiences might not find accessible. Instead, he gave his music an exotic flavor, using open fifths and chords in unusual keys, in ways pleasant to Western ears. Hammerstein faced the problem of how to represent Thai speech; he and Rodgers chose to convey it by musical sounds, made by the orchestra. For the King's style of speech, Hammerstein developed an abrupt, emphatic way of talking, which was mostly free of articles, as are many East Asian languages. The forceful style reflected the King's personality and was maintained even when he sang, especially in his one solo, "A Puzzlement". Many of the King's lines, including his first utterance, "Who? Who? Who?", and much of the initial scene between him and Anna, are drawn from Landon's version. Nevertheless, the King is presented more sympathetically in the musical than in the novel or the 1946 film, as the musical omits the torture and burning at the stake of Lady Tuptim and her partner.

With Rodgers laid up with back trouble, Hammerstein completed most of the musical's book before many songs were set to music. Early on, Hammerstein contacted set designer Jo Mielziner and costume designer Irene Sharaff and asked them to begin work in coordination with each other. Sharaff communicated with Jim Thompson, an American who had revived the Thai silk industry after World War II. Thompson sent Sharaff samples of silk cloth from Thailand and pictures of local dress from the mid-19th century. One such picture, of a Thai woman in western dress, inspired the song "Western People Funny", sung by the King's chief wife, Lady Thiang, while dressed in western garb.

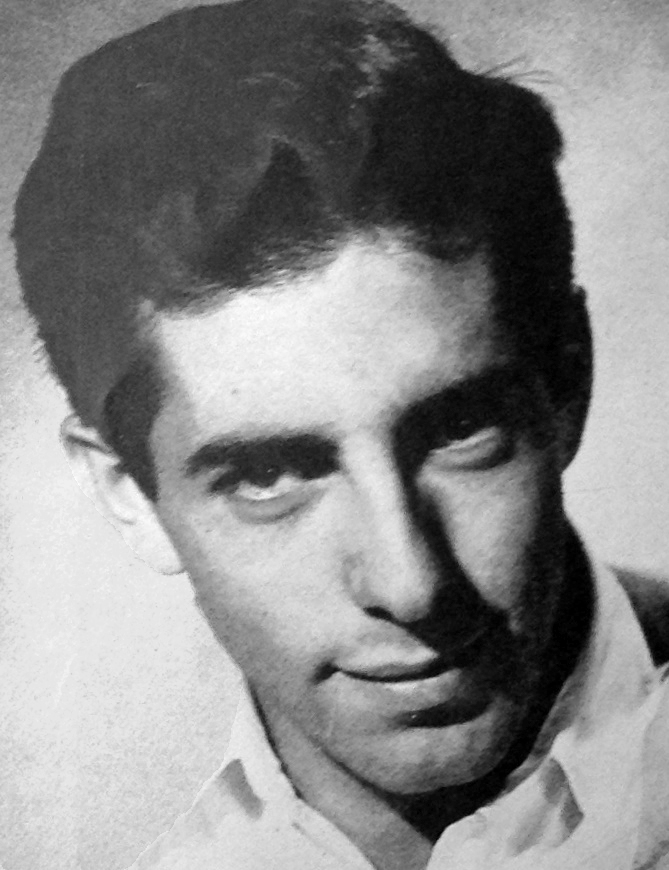
Choreographer Jerome Robbins

Producer Leland Hayward, who had worked with the duo on South Pacific, approached Jerome Robbins to choreograph a ballet for "The Small House of Uncle Thomas". Robbins was very enthusiastic about the project and asked to choreograph the other musical numbers as well, although Rodgers and Hammerstein had originally planned little other dancing. Robbins staged "The Small House of Uncle Thomas" as an intimate performance, rather than a large production number. His choreography for the parade of the King's children to meet their teacher ("March of the Royal Siamese Children") drew great acclaim. Robert Russell Bennett provided the orchestrations, and Trude Rittmann arranged the ballet music.

The pair discussed having an Act 1 musical scene involving Anna and the King's wives. The lyrics for that scene proved to be very difficult for Hammerstein to write. He first thought that Anna would simply tell the wives something about her past, and wrote such lyrics as "I was dazzled by the splendor/Of Calcutta and Bombay" and "The celebrities were many/And the parties very gay/(I recall a curry dinner/And a certain Major Grey)." Eventually, Hammerstein decided to write about how Anna felt, a song which would not only explain her past and her motivation for traveling with her son to the court of Siam, but also serve to establish a bond with Tuptim and lay the groundwork for the conflict that devastates Anna's relationship with the King. "Hello, Young Lovers", the resulting song, was the work of five exhausting weeks for Hammerstein. He finally sent the lyrics to Rodgers by messenger and awaited his reaction. Hammerstein considered the song his best work and was anxious to hear what Rodgers thought of it, but no comment came from Rodgers. Pride kept Hammerstein from asking. Finally, after four days, the two happened to be talking on the phone about other matters, and at the end of the conversation, Rodgers stated, very briefly, that the lyric was fine. Josh Logan, who had worked closely with Hammerstein on South Pacific, listened to the usually unflappable writer pour out his unhappy feelings. It was one of the few times that Hammerstein and Rodgers did not display a united front.

== Casting and auditions ==
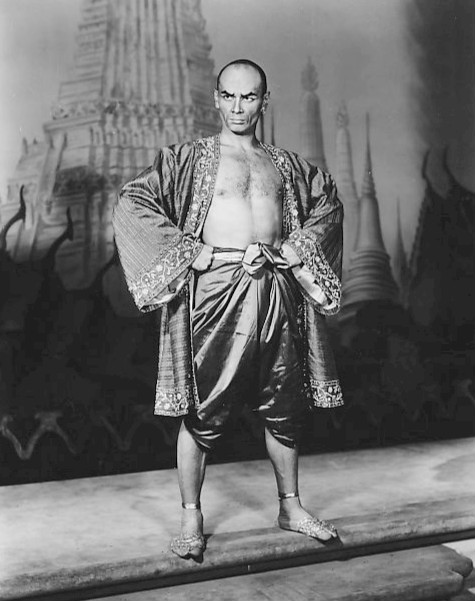
Yul Brynner in the original production of The King and I

Although the part of the King was only a supporting role to Lawrence's Anna, Hammerstein and Rodgers thought it essential that a well-known theatrical actor play it. The obvious choice was Rex Harrison, who had played the King in the movie, but he was booked, as was Noël Coward. Alfred Drake, the original Curly in Oklahoma!, made contractual demands which were deemed too high. With time running short before rehearsals, finding an actor to play the King became a major concern. Mary Martin, the original Nellie Forbush in South Pacific, suggested that her co-star in a 1946 musical set in China, Lute Song, try for the role. Rodgers recounted the audition of the Russian-American performer, Yul Brynner:

They told us the name of the first man and out he came with a bald head and sat cross-legged on the stage. He had a guitar and he hit his guitar one whack and gave out with this unearthly yell and sang some heathenish sort of thing, and Oscar and I looked at each other and said, "Well, that's it."

Brynner termed Rodgers' account "very picturesque, but totally inaccurate". He recalled that as an established television director (in CBS's Starlight Theatre, for example), he was reluctant to go back on the stage. His wife, his agent and Martin finally convinced him to read Hammerstein's working script, and once he did, he was fascinated by the character of the King and was eager to do the project. In any case, Brynner's fierce, mercurial, dangerous, yet surprisingly sensitive King was an ideal foil for Lawrence's strong-willed, yet vulnerable Anna, and when the two finally came together in "Shall We Dance?", where the King hesitantly touches Anna's waist, the chemistry was palpable.

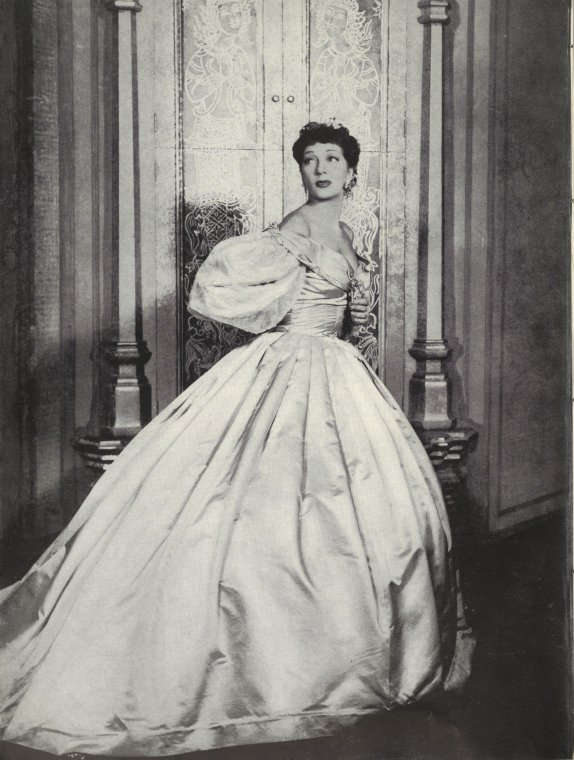
Gertrude Lawrence as Anna, in the Irene Sharaff-designed ball gown

Pre-rehearsal preparations began in late 1950. Hammerstein had wanted Logan to direct and co-write the book, as he had for South Pacific, but when Logan declined, Hammerstein decided to write the entire book himself. Instead of Logan, the duo hired as director John van Druten, who had worked with Lawrence years earlier. The costume designer, Sharaff, wryly pointed the press to the incongruity of a Victorian British governess in the midst of an exotic court: "The first-act finale of The King and I will feature Miss Lawrence, Mr. Brynner, and a pink satin ball gown." Mielziner's set plan was the simplest of the four Rodgers and Hammerstein musicals he had worked on, with one main set (the throne room), a number of front-stage drops (for the ship and Anna's room, for example) and the entire stage cleared for "The Small House of Uncle Thomas".

The show was budgeted at $250,000 (US$3,100,000 in 2025 dollars) making it the most expensive Rodgers and Hammerstein production to that point, and prompting some mockery that costs exceeded even their expensive flop Allegro. Investors included Hammerstein, Rodgers, Logan, Martin, Billy Rose and Hayward. The children who were cast as the young princes and princesses came from a wide range of ethnic backgrounds, including Puerto Rican or Italian, though none were Thai. Johnny Stewart was the original Prince Chulalongkorn but left the cast after only three months, replaced by Ronnie Lee. Sandy Kennedy was Louis, and Broadway veteran Larry Douglas played Lun Tha.

Shortly before rehearsals began in January 1951, Rodgers had the first Tuptim, Doretta Morrow, sing the entire score to Lawrence, including Lawrence's own songs. Lawrence listened calmly, but when she met Rodgers and Hammerstein the following day, she treated Rodgers coldly, apparently seeing the composer's actions as flaunting her vocal deficiencies. Hammerstein and Rodgers' doubts about whether Lawrence could handle the part were assuaged by the sheer force of her acting. James Poling, a writer for Collier's who was allowed to attend the rehearsals, wrote of Lawrence preparing "Shall I Tell You What I Think of You?":

She took the center of the barren stage wearing, for practice, a dirty muslin hoop over her slacks, with an old jacket thrown over her shoulders for warmth. She began rather quietly on the note, "Your servant! Your servant! Indeed I'm not your servant!" Then she gradually built the scene, slowly but powerfully, until, in a great crescendo, she ended prone on the floor, pounding in fury, and screaming, "Toads! Toads! Toads! All of your people are toads." When she finished, the handful of professionals in the theatre burst into admiring applause.

At his first meeting with Sharaff, Brynner, who had only a fringe of hair, asked what he was to do about it. When told he was to shave it, Brynner was horror-struck and refused, convinced he would look terrible. He finally gave in during tryouts and put dark makeup on his shaved head. The effect was so well-received that it became Brynner's trademark.

Lawrence's health caused her to miss several rehearsals, though no one knew what was wrong with her. When the tryout opened in New Haven, Connecticut on February 27, 1951, the show was nearly four hours long. Lawrence, suffering from laryngitis, had missed the dress rehearsal but managed to make it through the first public performance. The Variety critic noted that despite her recent illness she "slinks, acts, cavorts, and in general exhibits exceedingly well her several facets for entertaining", but the Philadelphia Bulletin printed that her "already thin voice is now starting to wear a great deal thinner". Leland Hayward came to see the show in New Haven and shocked Rodgers by advising him to close it before it went any further. Additionally, when the show left New Haven for Boston for more tryout performances, it was still at least 45 minutes too long. Gemze de Lappe, who was one of the dancers, recalled one cut that she regretted:

They took out a wonderful scene. Mrs. Anna's first entrance into the palace comes with a song in which she sings, "Over half a year I have been waiting, waiting, waiting, waiting, waiting, waiting outside your door." At the end she points her umbrella at him, or something like that, and the King says "Off with her head" or words to that effect, and the eunuchs pick her up and carry her off. The King says "Who, who, who?" with great satisfaction, and finds out that he has just thrown out the English schoolteacher. So he says, "Bring her back!" and she is ushered in ... we all loved it.

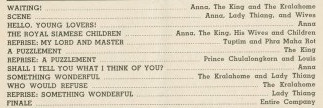
Part of the Act I song list from the New Haven tryout

This song, "Waiting", was a trio for Anna, the King, and the Kralahome (the King's prime minister). "Who Would Refuse?", the Kralahome's only solo, was also dropped. Left without a note to sing, Mervyn Vye abandoned the show and was replaced by John Juliano. "Now You Leave", a song for Lady Thiang (played by Dorothy Sarnoff in the original production), was also cut. After the cuts, Rodgers and Hammerstein felt that the first act was lacking something. Lawrence suggested that they write a song for Anna and the children. Mary Martin reminded them of a song that had been cut from South Pacific, "Suddenly Lucky". Hammerstein wrote a new lyric for the melody, and the resulting song became "Getting to Know You". "Western People Funny" and "I Have Dreamed" were also added in Boston.

Brynner regretted that there were not more tryout performances, feeling that the schedule did not give him an adequate opportunity to develop the complex role of the King. When he told this to Hammerstein and Rodgers, they asked what sort of performance they would get from him, and he responded, "It will be good enough, it will get the reviews."

== Plot ==
=== Act 1 ===
In 1862, a strong-willed, widowed schoolteacher, Anna Leonowens, arrives in Bangkok, Siam (later known as Thailand) at the request of the King of Siam to tutor his many children. Anna's young son, Louis, fears the severe countenance of the King's prime minister, the Kralahome, but Anna refuses to be intimidated ("I Whistle a Happy Tune"). The Kralahome has come to escort them to the palace, where they are expected to live – a violation of Anna's contract, which calls for them to live in a separate house. She considers returning to Singapore aboard the vessel that brought them, but goes with her son and the Kralahome.

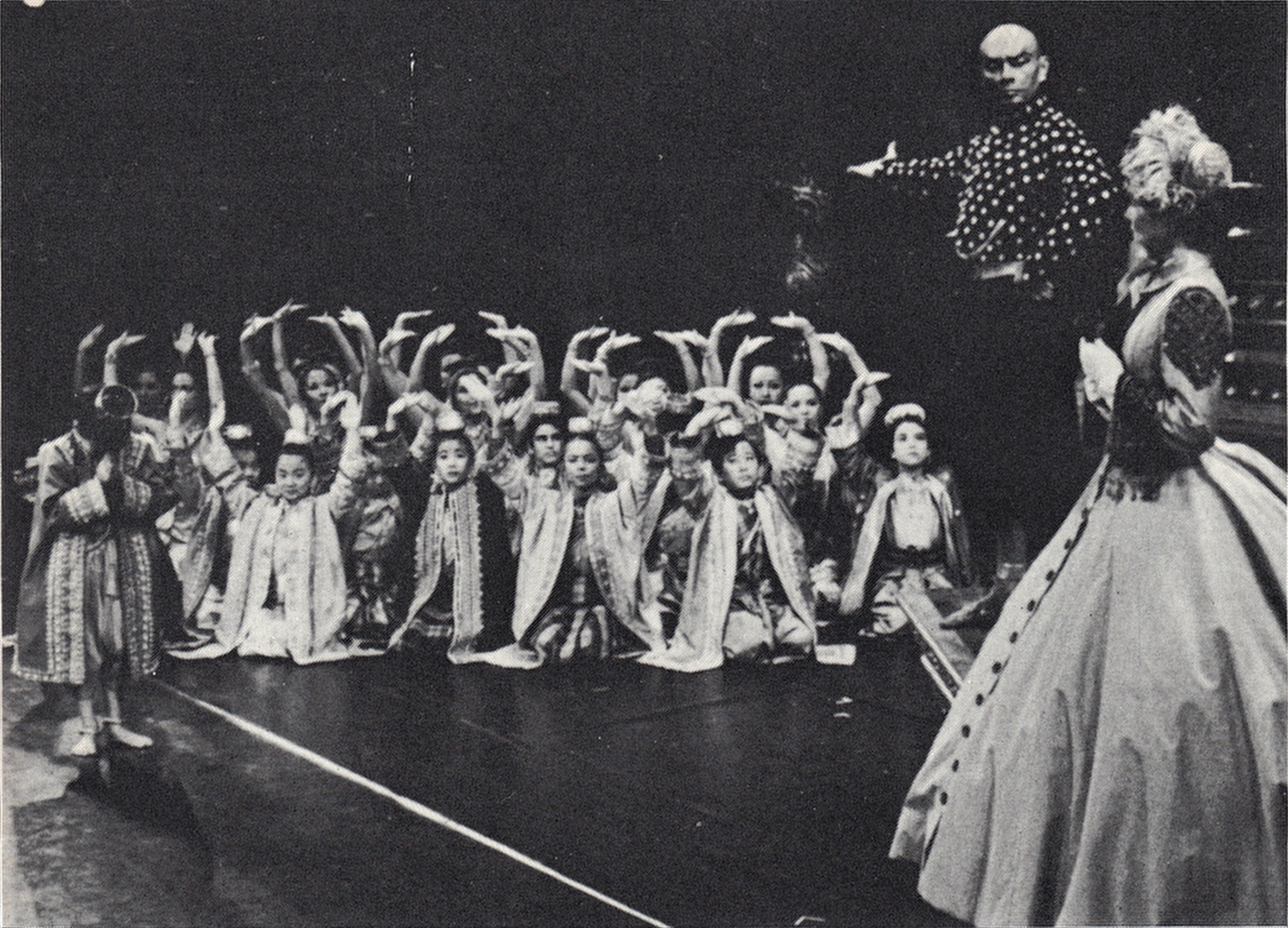
The King of Siam (Yul Brynner) presents (some of) his children to Anna (Constance Towers), in 1977

Several weeks pass, during which Anna and Louis are confined to their palace rooms. The King receives a gift from the king of Burma, a lovely slave girl named Tuptim, to be one of his many wives. She is escorted by Lun Tha, a scholar who has come to copy a design for a temple, and the two are secretly in love. Tuptim, left alone, declares that the King may own her, but not her heart ("My Lord and Master"). The King gives Anna her first audience. The schoolteacher is a part of his plan for the modernization of Siam; he is impressed when she already knows this. She raises the issue of her house with him, he dismisses her protests and orders her to talk with his wives. They are interested in her, and she tells them of her late husband, Tom ("Hello, Young Lovers"). The King presents her new pupils; Anna is to teach those of his children whose mothers are in favor with him – several dozen – and is to teach their mothers as well. The princes and princesses enter in procession ("March of the Royal Siamese Children"). Anna is charmed by the children, and formality breaks down after the ceremony as they crowd around her.

Anna has not given up on the house, and teaches the children proverbs and songs extolling the virtues of home life, to the King's irritation. The King has enough worries without battling the schoolteacher, and wonders why the world has become so complicated ("A Puzzlement"). The children and wives are hard at work learning English ("The Royal Bangkok Academy"). The children are surprised by a map showing how small Siam is compared with the rest of the world ("Getting to Know You"). As the crown prince, Chulalongkorn, disputes the map, the King enters a chaotic schoolroom. He orders the pupils to believe the teacher but complains to Anna about her lessons about "home". Anna stands her ground and insists on the letter of her contract, threatening to leave Siam, much to the dismay of wives and children. The King orders her to obey as "my servant"; she repudiates the term and hurries away. The King dismisses school, then leaves, uncertain of his next action. Meanwhile, Lun Tha comes upon Tuptim, and they muse about having to hide their relationship ("We Kiss in a Shadow").

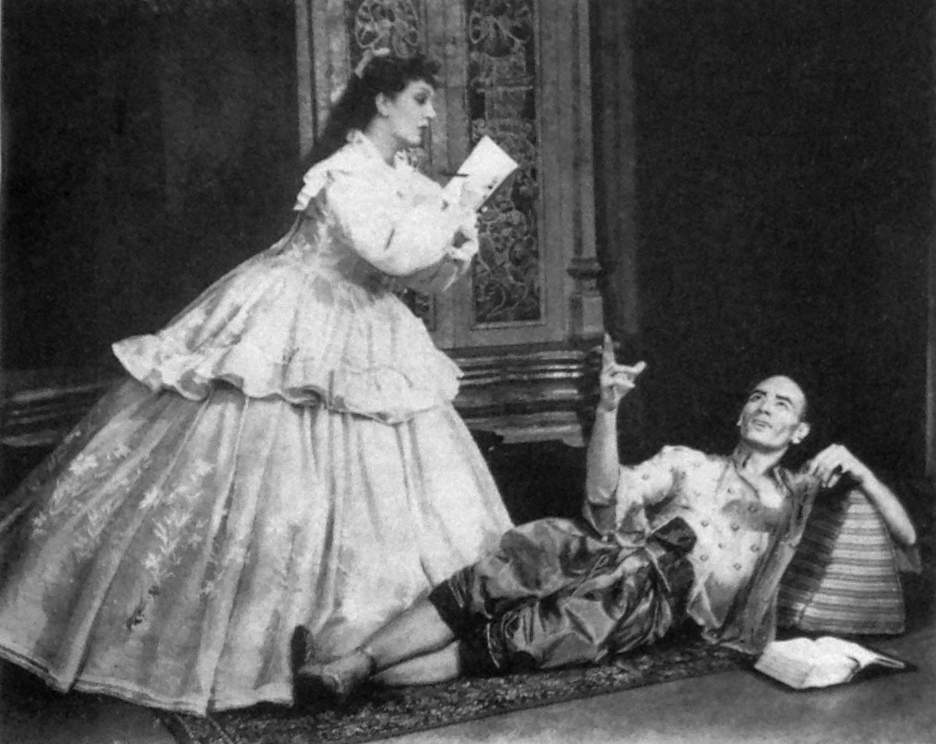
Lawrence as Anna takes dictation from the King (Brynner), 1951

In her room, Anna replays the confrontation in her mind, her anger building ("Shall I Tell You What I Think of You?"). Lady Thiang, the King's head wife, tells Anna that the King is troubled by his portrayal in the West as a barbarian, as the British are being urged to take over Siam as a protectorate. Anna is shocked by the accusations – the King is a polygamist, but he is no barbarian – but she is reluctant to see him after their argument. Lady Thiang convinces her that the King is deserving of support ("Something Wonderful"). Anna goes to him and finds him anxious for reconciliation. The King tells her that the British are sending an envoy to Bangkok to evaluate the situation. Anna "guesses" – the only guise in which the King will accept advice – that the King will receive the envoy in European style, and that the wives will be dressed in Western fashion. Tuptim has been writing a play based on a book that Anna has lent her, Uncle Tom's Cabin, that can be presented to the guests. News is brought to the King that the British are arriving much earlier than thought, and so Anna and the wives are to stay up all night to prepare. The King assembles his family for a Buddhist prayer for the success of the venture and also promises before Buddha that Anna will receive her own house "as provided in agreement, etc., etc."

=== Act 2 ===
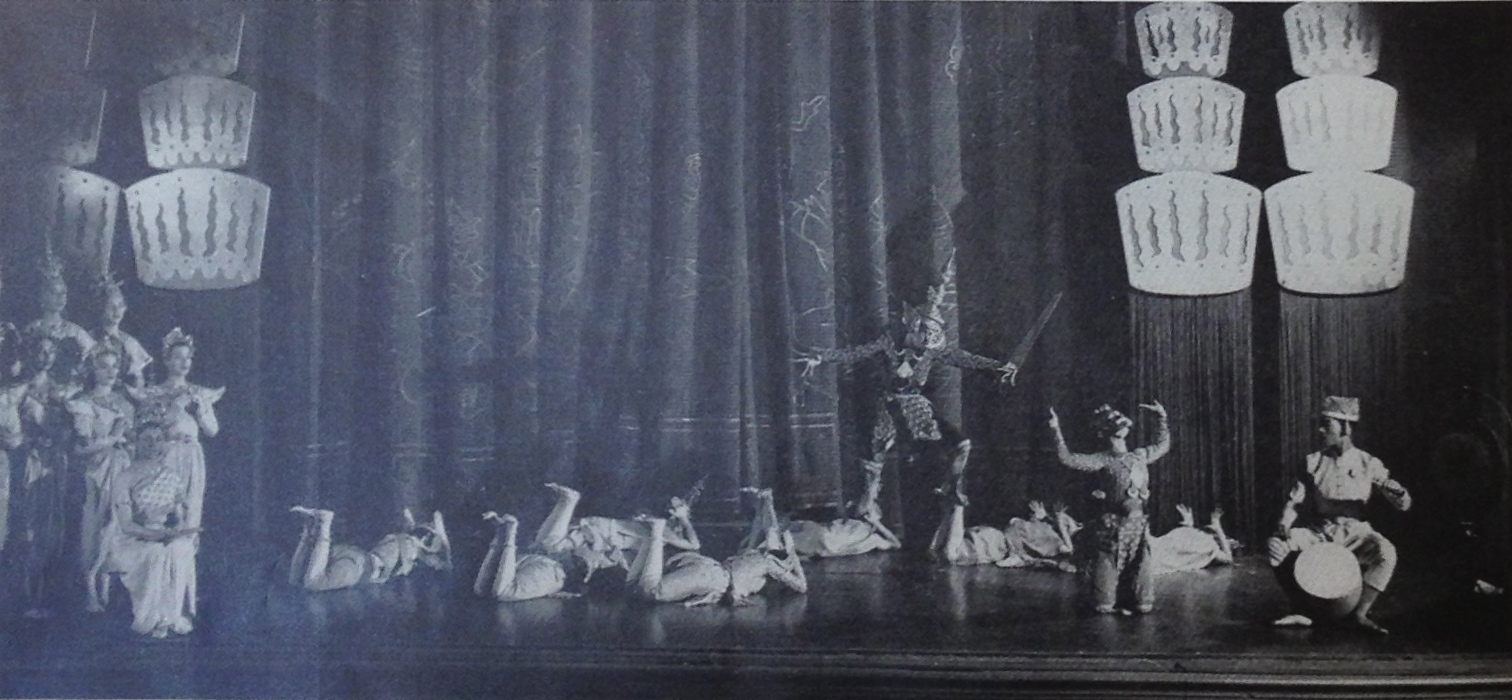
"The Small House of Uncle Thomas" scene

The wives are dressed in their new European-style gowns, which they find confining ("Western People Funny"). In the rush to prepare, the question of undergarments has been overlooked, and the wives have practically nothing on underneath their gowns. When the British envoy, Sir Edward Ramsay, arrives and gazes at them through a monocle, they are panicked by the "evil eye" and lift their skirts over their heads as they flee. Sir Edward is diplomatic about the incident. When the King is called away, it emerges that Sir Edward is an old flame of Anna's, and they dance in remembrance of old times, as Edward urges her to return to British society. The King returns and irritably reminds them that dancing is for after dinner.

As final preparations for the play are made, Tuptim steals a moment to meet with Lun Tha. He tells her he has an escape plan, and she should be ready to leave after the performance ("I Have Dreamed"). Anna encounters them, and they confide in her ("Hello, Young Lovers", reprise). The play ("Small House of Uncle Thomas", narrated ballet) is presented in a Siamese ballet-inspired dance. Tuptim is the narrator, and she tells her audience of the evil King Simon of Legree and his pursuit of the runaway slave Eliza. Eliza is saved by Buddha, who miraculously freezes a river and conceals her in snow. Buddha then causes the river to melt, drowning King Simon and his hunting party. The anti-slavery message is blunt.

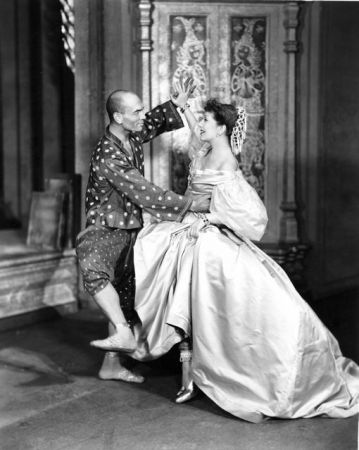
Brynner and Lawrence perform "Shall We Dance?"

After the play, Sir Edward reveals that the British threat has receded, but the King is distracted by his displeasure at Tuptim's rebellious message. After Sir Edward leaves, Anna and the King express their delight at how well the evening went, and he presents her with a ring. Secret police report that Tuptim is missing. The King realizes that Anna knows something; she parries his inquiry by asking why he should care, as Tuptim is just another woman to him. He is delighted; she is at last understanding the Siamese perspective. Anna tries to explain to him the Western customs of courtship and tells him what it is like for a young woman at a formal dance ("Shall We Dance?"). He demands that she teach him the dance. She does, and in that dance they experience and express a love for each other that they can never speak aloud. They are interrupted by the Kralahome. Tuptim has been captured, and a search is on for Lun Tha. The King resolves to punish Tuptim, though she denies she and Lun Tha were lovers. Anna tries to dissuade him, but he is determined that her influence shall not rule, and he takes the whip himself. He turns to lash Tuptim, but under Anna's gaze is unable to swing the whip, and hurries away. Lun Tha is found dead, and Tuptim is dragged off, swearing to kill herself; nothing more is heard about her. Anna asks the Kralahome to give her ring back to the King; both schoolteacher and minister state their wish that she had never come to Siam.

Several months pass with no contact between Anna and the King. Anna is packed and ready to board a ship leaving Siam. Chulalongkorn arrives with a letter from the King, who has been unable to resolve the conflicts within himself and is dying. Anna hurries to the King's bedside and they reconcile. The King persuades her to take back the ring and to stay and assist the next king, Chulalongkorn. The dying man tells Anna to take dictation from the prince, and instructs the boy to give orders as if he were King. The prince orders the end of the custom of kowtowing that Anna hated. The King grudgingly accepts this decision. As Chulalongkorn continues, prescribing a less arduous bow to show respect for the king, his father dies. Anna kneels by the late King, holding his hand and kissing it, as the wives and children bow or curtsey, a gesture of respect to old king and new.

== Principal roles and notable performers ==
Character	Description	Original Broadway cast	Other notable stage performers in long-running, noteworthy productions
Anna Leonowens	A widowed Briton, in Siam to teach the royal children	Gertrude Lawrence	Eileen Brennan, Constance Carpenter, Jan Clayton, Barbara Cook, Annamary Dickey, Sandy Duncan, Valerie Hobson, Celeste Holm, Sally Ann Howes, Laura Michelle Kelly, Angela Lansbury, Josie Lawrence, Marin Mazzie, Lisa McCune, Maureen McGovern, Virginia McKenna, Hayley Mills, Patricia Marand, Patricia Morison, Donna Murphy, Kelli O'Hara, Marie Osmond, Elaine Paige, Mary Beth Peil, Stefanie Powers, Faith Prince, Liz Robertson, Risë Stevens, Constance Towers
The King of Siam	A fictionalized version of the historical King Mongkut	Yul Brynner	Farley Granger, Kevin Gray, Daniel Dae Kim, Hoon Lee, Jason Scott Lee, Jose Llana, Herbert Lom, Darren McGavin, Paul Nakauchi, Rudolf Nureyev, Lou Diamond Phillips, Zachary Scott, Teddy Tahu Rhodes, Ramon Tikaram, Ken Watanabe, Peter Wyngarde
Lady Thiang	The King's chief wife	Dorothy Sarnoff	Ruthie Ann Miles, Patricia Neway, Muriel Smith, Terry Saunders, Joan Almedilla, Naoko Mori
Lun Tha	A Burmese scholar and envoy, in love with Tuptim	Larry Douglas	Sean Ghazi, Jose Llana, Martin Vidnovic, Conrad Ricamora, Dean John-Wilson
Tuptim	A slave brought from Burma to be one of the King's junior wives	Doretta Morrow	June Angela, Joy Clements, Lee Venora, Patricia Welch, Na-Young Jeon, Ashley Park
Prince Chulalongkorn	A fictionalized version of Mongkut's eldest son and heir	Johnny Stewart	Sal Mineo
The Kralahome	The King's prime minister	John Juliano	Martin Benson, Saeed Jaffrey, Randall Duk Kim, Ho Yi, Paul Nakauchi, Takao Osawa
Louis Leonowens	Anna's son	Sandy Kennedy	Jeffrey Bryan Davis, Jake Lucas

== Musical numbers ==
Act I

- Overture – Orchestra
- "I Whistle a Happy Tune" – Anna and Louis
- "My Lord and Master" – Tuptim
- "Hello, Young Lovers" – Anna
- "March of the Royal Siamese Children" – Orchestra
- "A Puzzlement" – King
- "The Royal Bangkok Academy" – Anna, Wives and Children
- "Getting to Know You" – Anna, Wives and Children
- "We Kiss in a Shadow" – Tuptim and Lun Tha
- "A Puzzlement" (reprise) – Louis and Prince Chulalongkorn
- "Shall I Tell You What I Think of You?" – Anna
- "Something Wonderful" – Lady Thiang
- "Buddhist Prayer"/Act I finale – King and Company

Act II

- Entr'acte – Orchestra
- "Western People Funny" – Lady Thiang and Wives
- "I Have Dreamed" – Tuptim and Lun Tha
- "Hello, Young Lovers" (reprise) – Anna
- "The Small House of Uncle Thomas" (Ballet) – Tuptim and Wives
- "Song of the King" – King and Anna
- "Shall We Dance?" – Anna and the King
- "I Whistle a Happy Tune" (reprise) – Anna
- "Something Wonderful" (reprise, finale ultimo) – Orchestra

== Productions ==
=== Original productions ===
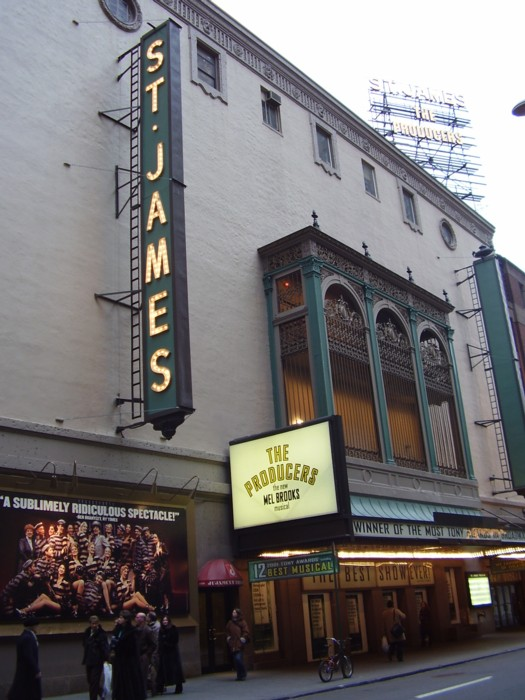
The King and I opened in 1951 at the St. James Theatre (seen in 2006).

The King and I opened on Broadway on March 29, 1951, with a wide expectation of a hit by the press and public. Both Hammerstein and Rodgers professed to be worried. The composer complained that most people were not concerned about whether the show was good, but whether it was better than South Pacific. Even the weather cooperated: heavy rain in New York stopped in time to allow the mostly wealthy or connected opening night audience to arrive dry at the St. James Theatre. Margaret Landon, author of the book on which the musical was based, was not invited to opening night.

Brynner turned in an outstanding performance that night, nearly stealing the show. Lawrence knew that the company was nervous because of her illnesses. The director, John van Druten, described how her opening night performance put all worries to rest: "She came on the stage with a new and dazzling quality, as if an extra power had been granted to the brilliance of her stage light. She was radiant and wonderful." The rave reviews in the newspapers lifted Lawrence's spirits, and she expected a lengthy run as Anna, first on Broadway, then in London's West End, and finally on film. Lawrence won a Tony Award for her leading role, while Brynner won the award for best featured actor. The show won the Tony for best musical, and designers Mielziner and Sharaff received awards in their categories.

De Lappe remembered the contrast between Lawrence's indifferent singing voice and the force of her performance:

I used to listen to Gertrude Lawrence on the public address system every night in our dressing rooms, and she'd get onto a note and sag down off of it. The night after I left the show to go into Paint Your Wagon, Yul Brynner gave me house seats and I saw her from the front and I was so taken by her. She had such a star quality, you didn't care if she sang off-key. She more than dominated the stage. Boy, was that a lesson to me.

==== Lawrence's death and aftermath ====
Lawrence had not yet discovered that she was nearing death from liver cancer, and her weakened condition was exacerbated by the demands of her role. At the age of 52, she was required to wear dresses weighing 75 pounds (34 kg) while walking or dancing a total of 4 miles (6.4 km) during a 3 1/2 hour performance eight times a week. Lawrence found it hard to bear the heat in the theatre during the summer months. Her understudy, Constance Carpenter, began to replace her in matinees. Later in the year Lawrence's strength returned, and she resumed her full schedule, but by Christmas she was battling pleurisy and suffering from exhaustion. She entered the hospital for a full week of tests. Just nine months before her death, the cancer still was not detected. In February 1952, bronchitis felled her for another week, and her husband Richard Aldrich asked Rodgers and Hammerstein if they would consider closing the show for Easter week to give her a chance to recover fully. They denied his request, but agreed to replace her with the original Ado Annie from Oklahoma!, Celeste Holm, for six weeks during the summer. Meanwhile, Lawrence's performances were deteriorating, prompting audiences to become audibly restive. Rodgers and Hammerstein prepared a letter, never delivered, advising her that "eight times a week you are losing the respect of 1,500 people". On August 16, 1952, she fainted following a matinee performance and was admitted to the NewYork–Presbyterian Hospital. She slipped into a coma and died on September 6, 1952, at the age of 54. Her autopsy revealed liver cancer. On the day of her funeral, the performance of The King and I was cancelled. The lights of Broadway and the West End were dimmed in her honor, and she was buried in the ball gown she wore during Act 2.

Carpenter assumed the role of Anna and went on to play it for 620 performances. Other Annas during the run included Holm, Annamary Dickey and Patricia Morison. Although Brynner later boasted of never missing a show, he missed several, once when stagehands at the St. James Theatre accidentally struck him in the nose with a piece of scenery, another time due to appendicitis. Also, for three months in 1952 (and occasionally in 1953), Alfred Drake replaced Brynner. One young actor, Sal Mineo, began as an extra, then became an understudy for a younger prince, then an understudy and later a replacement for Crown Prince Chulalongkorn. Mineo began a close friendship and working relationship with Brynner which would last for more than a decade. Another replacement was Terry Saunders as Lady Thiang. She reprised the role in the 1956 film. The last of the production's 1,246 performances was on March 20, 1954. The run was, at the time, the fourth longest ever for a Broadway musical. A U.S. national tour began on March 22, 1954, at the Community Theatre, Hershey, Pennsylvania, starring Brynner and Morison. The tour played in 30 cities, closing on December 17, 1955, at the Shubert Theatre, Philadelphia.

The original London production opened on October 8, 1953, at the Theatre Royal, Drury Lane, and was warmly received by both audiences and critics; it ran for 946 performances. The show was restaged by Jerome Whyte. The cast featured Valerie Hobson, in her last role, as Anna; Herbert Lom as the King; and Muriel Smith as Lady Thiang. Martin Benson played the Kralahome, a role he reprised in the film. Eve Lister was a replacement for Hobson, and George Pastell replaced Lom during the long run. The New York Times theatre columnist Brooks Atkinson saw the production with Lister and Pastell, and thought the cast commonplace, except for Smith, whom he praised both for her acting and her voice. Atkinson commented, "The King and I is a beautifully written musical drama on a high plane of human thinking. It can survive in a mediocre performance."

The musical was soon premiered in Australia, Japan, and throughout Europe.

=== Early revivals ===
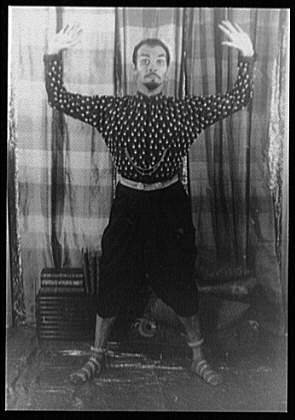
Zachary Scott in the 1956 revival of The King and I

The first revival of The King and I in New York was presented by the New York City Center Light Opera Company in April and May 1956 for three weeks, starring Jan Clayton and Zachary Scott, directed by John Fearnley, with Robbins' choreography recreated by June Graham. Muriel Smith reprised her London role of Lady Thiang, and Patrick Adiarte repeated his film role, Chulalongkorn. This company presented the musical again in May 1960 with Barbara Cook and Farley Granger, again directed by Fearnley, in another three-week engagement. Atkinson admired the purity of Cook's voice and thought that she portrayed Anna with "a cool dignity that gives a little more stature to the part than it has had before." He noted that Granger brought "a fresh point of view – as well as a full head of hair". Joy Clements played Tuptim, and Anita Darian was Lady Thiang. City Center again presented the show in June 1963, starring Eileen Brennan and Manolo Fabregas, directed by Fearnley. Clements and Darian reprised Tuptim and Thiang respectively. In the final City Center Light Opera production, Michael Kermoyan played the King opposite Constance Towers for three weeks in May 1968. Darian again played Lady Thiang. For all of these 1960s productions, Robbins' choreography was reproduced by Yuriko, who had played the role of Eliza in the original Broadway production and reprised the role in the City Center productions.

The Music Theatre of Lincoln Center, with Rodgers as producer, presented the musical in mid-1964 at the New York State Theater, starring Risë Stevens and Darren McGavin, with Michael Kermoyan as the Kralahome. Lun Tha, Tuptim and Thiang were played by Frank Porretta, Lee Venora and Patricia Neway. Costumes were by Irene Sharaff, the designer for the original productions and the film adaptation. The director was Edward Greenberg, with the Robbins choreography again reproduced by Yuriko. This was Music Theatre's debut production, a five-week engagement.

The King and I was revived at London's Adelphi Theatre on October 10, 1973, running for 260 performances until May 25, 1974, starring Sally Ann Howes as Anna and Peter Wyngarde as the King. Roger Redfarn directed, and Sheila O'Neill choreographed. The production, which began in June 1973 with a tour of the English provinces, earned mixed to warm reviews. Michael Billington in The Guardian called the revival "well played and well sung". Although he was enthusiastic about Howes as Anna, Billington thought Wyngarde "too fragile to be capable of inspiring unholy terror". He praised Redfarn's production – "whipped along at a good pace and made a sumptuous eyeful out of the interpolated ballet on 'Uncle Tom's Cabin'." Less favorably, Robert Cushman in The Observer thought the production "scenically and economically under-nourished". He liked Wyngarde's King ("a dignified clown") but thought Howes not formidable enough to stand up to him as Anna. He noted that "she sings beautifully and the songs are the evening's real justification".

=== Brynner reprises the role ===
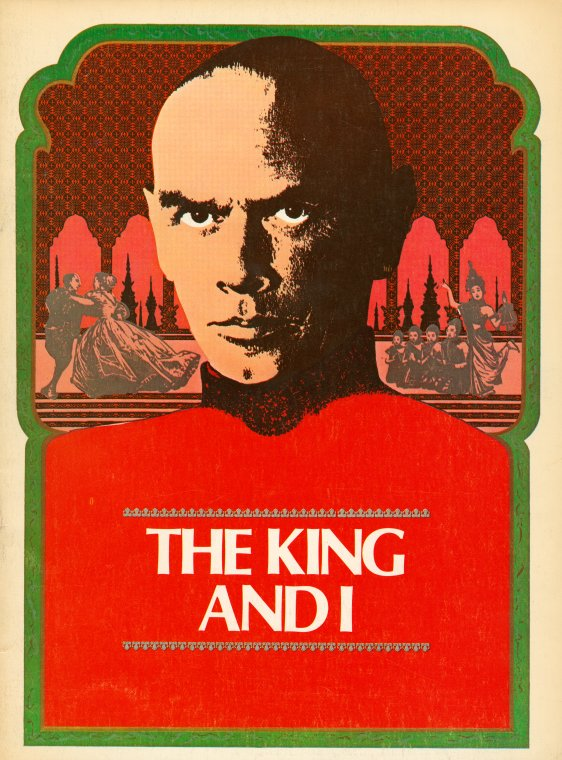
Brynner on the 1977 program cover

In early 1976, Brynner received an offer from impresarios Lee Guber and Shelly Gross to star, in the role that he had created 25 years before, in a U.S. national tour and Broadway revival. The tour opened in Los Angeles on July 26, 1976, with Constance Towers reprising the role of Anna. On opening night, Brynner suffered so badly from laryngitis that he lip-synched, with his son Rock singing and speaking the role from the orchestra pit. The production traveled across the United States, selling out every city it appeared in and finally opening in New York at the Uris Theatre (today the Gershwin Theatre) on May 2, 1977. The production featured Martin Vidnovic as Lun Tha, and Susan Kikuchi danced the part of Eliza, recreating the role that her mother, Yuriko, had originated. Yuriko both directed the production and recreated the Robbins choreography. Sharaff again designed costumes, and Michael Kermoyan reprised the role of the Kralahome, while June Angela was Tuptim. The run lasted 696 performances, almost two years, during which each of the stars took off three weeks, with Angela Lansbury replacing Towers and Kermoyan replacing Brynner. The production was nominated for the Drama Desk Award for Outstanding Musical.

Brynner insisted on renovations to the Uris before he would play there, stating that the theatre resembled "a public toilet". He also insisted that dressing rooms on the tour and at the Uris be arranged to his satisfaction. According to his biographer Michelangelo Capua, for years afterwards, performers thanked Brynner for having backstage facilities across the country cleaned up. New York Times reviewer Clive Barnes said of the revival, "The cast is a good one. Mr. Brynner grinning fire and snorting charm is as near to the original as makes little difference" and called Towers "piquantly ladylike and sweet without being dangerously saccharine". However, fellow Times critic Mel Gussow warned, later in the run, that "to a certain extent [Brynner] was coasting on his charisma".

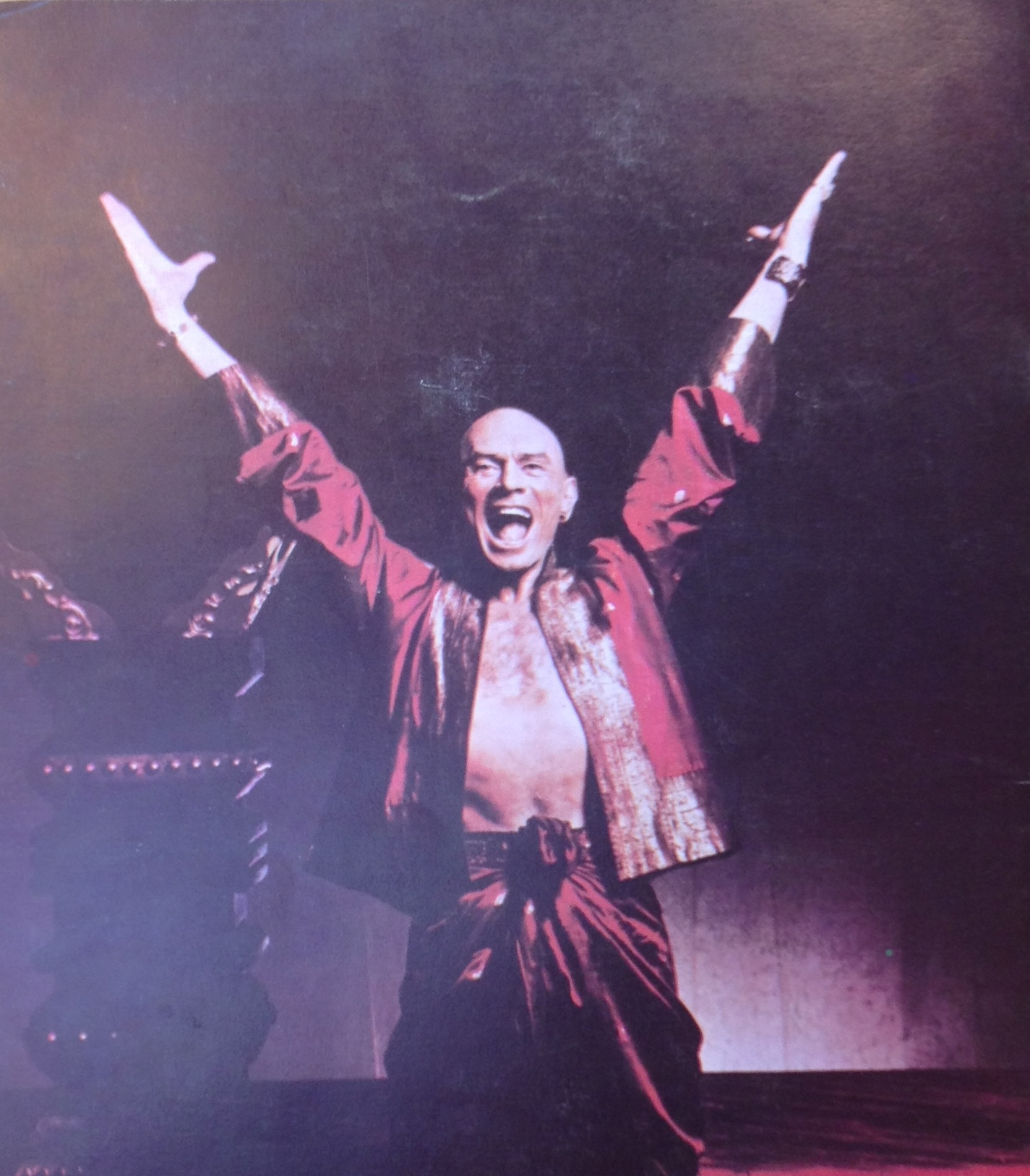
Brynner in 1977: "Every day I do my best for one more day."

The tour was extended in 1979, after the New York run, still starring Brynner and Towers. The production then opened in the West End, at the London Palladium, on June 12, 1979, and was reported to have the largest advance sale in English history. Brynner stated, "It is not a play, it is a happening." Virginia McKenna starred in London as Anna, winning an Olivier Award for her performance. June Angela again played Tuptim, and John Bennett was the Kralahome. It ran until September 27, 1980.

Brynner took only a few months off after the London run ended, which contributed to his third divorce; he returned to the road in early 1981 in an extended U.S. tour of the same production, which eventually ended on Broadway. Mitch Leigh produced and directed, and Robbins' choreography was reproduced by Rebecca West, who also danced the role of Simon of Legree, which she had danced at the Uris in 1977. Patricia Marand played Anna, Michael Kermoyan was again the Kralahome, Patricia Welch was Tuptim. During 1981, Kate Hunter Brown took over as Anna, continuing in the role for at least a year and a half. By 1983, Mary Beth Peil was playing Anna. On September 13, 1983, in Los Angeles, Brynner celebrated his 4,000th performance as the King; on the same day he was privately diagnosed with inoperable lung cancer, and the tour had to shut down for a few months while he received painful radiation therapy to shrink the tumor. The Washington Post reviewer saw Brynner's "absolutely last farewell tour" in December 1984 and wrote of the star:

When Brynner opened in the original production in 1951, he was the newcomer and Gertrude Lawrence the established star. Now, 33 years and 4,300 performances later, he is the king of the mountain as well as the show ... The genius of his performance – and it must be some sort of genius to maintain a character this long – is its simplicity. There is not a superfluous expression nor a vague gesture. And if at times, the arms on hips posture, the shining dome and fierce expression remind one of Mr. Clean, it should be remembered that Brynner was there first.

The production reached New York in January 1985, running for 191 performances at the Broadway Theatre, with Brynner, Peil, Welch and West still playing their roles. The part of Eliza was played by the leading man's fourth wife, Kathy Lee Brynner, and newcomer Jeffrey Bryan Davis played Louis. During the run, Brynner was unable to sing "A Puzzlement", due to what was announced as a throat and ear infection, but he "projected bursting vitality to the top of the balcony." He received a special Tony Award for his role as the King and had come to dominate the musical to such an extent that Peil was nominated merely for a featured actress Tony as Anna. Leigh was nominated for a Tony for his direction. New York Times critic Frank Rich praised Brynner but was ambivalent about the production, which he called "sluggish", writing that Brynner's "high points included his fond, paternalistic joshing with his brood in 'The March of the Siamese Children,' his dumb-show antics while attempting to force the English schoolteacher Anna to bow, and, of course, the death scene. ... The star aside, such showmanship is too often lacking in this King and I." The last performance was a special Sunday night show, on June 30, 1985, in honor of Brynner and his 4,625th performance of the role. Brynner died less than four months later, on October 10, 1985.

From August 1989 to March 1990, Rudolf Nureyev played the King in a North American tour opposite Liz Robertson, with Kermoyan as the Kralahome, directed by Arthur Storch and with the original Robbins choreography. Reviews were uniformly critical, lamenting that Nureyev failed to embody the character, "a King who stands around like a sulky teenager who didn't ask to be invited to this party. ... Not even his one dance number ... goes well. ... Rodgers and Hammerstein's King [is] supposed to be a compelling personality [but Nureyev's] bears no resemblance to the man described ... in the "Something Wonderful" number. The show therefore comes across as something of a charade ... with everyone pretending to be dealing with a fearsome potentate who, in fact, is displaying very little personality at all."

=== Renshaw's production (1991–2003) ===
The first major revival to break away from the original staging and interpretation was an Australian production directed by Christopher Renshaw, starring Hayley Mills as Anna, in 1991. Renshaw pointedly ignored the printed stage directions in the script when reshaping the piece into what he called "an authentic Thai experience". The production had a more sinister Siamese setting, a less elegant but more forceful Anna, and a younger King (Tony Marinyo). The attraction between Anna and the King was made explicit. Renshaw "cut a few lines and lyrics, and translated others into Thai to reinforce the atmosphere of a foreign land", and all Asian roles were played by Asian actors. He also asked choreographers Lar Lubovitch and Jerome Robbins to create a "spiritual" ballet, for the King's entrance in Act 1, and a procession with a sacred white elephant in Act II. According to Renshaw, "The reds and golds were very much inspired by what we saw at the royal palace", and set and costume elements reflected images, architecture and other designs in the palace and elsewhere in Bangkok. For example, the stage was framed by columns of elephant figures, a large emerald Buddha loomed over Act I, and hundreds of elephant images were woven into the set. Renshaw said, "The elephant is regarded as a very holy creature ... they believe the spirit of Buddha often resides in the form of the elephant."

Stanley Green, in his Encyclopedia of the Musical Theatre, viewed the central theme of The King and I as "the importance of mutual understanding between people of differing ethnic and cultural backgrounds", but Renshaw felt the musical suffered from 1950s attitudes when "Orientalism was used as an exoticism rather than a real understanding of the particular culture." He stated that his production was informed by authentic Thai cultural, aesthetic and religious ideas that he learned from visiting Thailand. A feature in Playbill commented that the production focused on the "clash of ideologies and cultures, of East versus West". Theatre arts professor Eileen Blumenthal, however, called the production "a King and I for the age of political correctness". While she acknowledged that the musical's treatment of Asian cultures had come to be viewed as insensitive over the decades since its premiere, she argued that Rodgers and Hammerstein's script was more sensitive than most orientalist literature of its day, in that "West learns from East as well as the other way around", and that, moreover, the musical's treatment of its Asian subject is fantastical, not intended to be realistic. She concluded that the show is a documentary of "who we've been" in the West, and that The King and I should not be suppressed, because it is "too good".

The production was reproduced on Broadway, opening on April 11, 1996, at the Neil Simon Theatre, starring Donna Murphy as Anna, who won a Tony Award for her performance, and Lou Diamond Phillips as the King, with Randall Duk Kim as the Kralahome, Jose Llana as Lun Tha, Joohee Choi as Tuptim and Taewon Yi Kim as Lady Thiang. Jenna Ushkowitz made her Broadway debut as one of the children. The production was nominated for eight Tony Awards, winning best revival and three others, with acting nominations for Phillips and Choi, who each won Theatre World Awards, and seven Drama Desk Awards, winning for Outstanding Revival of a Musical; Renshaw won for his direction. The production was praised for "lavish ... sumptuous" designs by Roger Kirk (costumes) and Brian Thomson (sets), who both won Tony and Drama Desk Awards for their work. Faith Prince played the role of Anna later in the run, followed by Marie Osmond. The revival ran on Broadway for 780 performances, and Kevin Gray replaced Phillips. The production then toured in the U.S., starring Mills and Victor Talmadge. Other Annas on this tour included Osmond, Sandy Duncan, Stefanie Powers and Maureen McGovern, who ended the tour in Chicago in June 1998.

The production opened on May 3, 2000, at the London Palladium, directed by Renshaw and choreographed by Lubovitch, and using the Kirk and Thomson designs. It reportedly took in £8 million in advance ticket sales. The cast included Elaine Paige as Anna and Jason Scott Lee as the King, with Sean Ghazi as Luan Tha and Ho Yi as the Kralahome. Lady Thiang was, again, played by Taewon Yi Kim, of whom The Observer wrote, "Her 'Something Wonderful' was just that." The show was nominated for an Olivier Award for outstanding musical. Later in the run, Lee was replaced as the King by Paul Nakauchi. The revival was generally well received. The Daily Mirror said: "The King and I waltzed back to the West End in triumph last night." The Daily Express observed, "Love it or loathe it, The King and I is an unstoppable smash." Variety, however, noted a lack of chemistry between the leads, commenting that "there's something not entirely right in Siam when the greatest applause is reserved for Lady Thiang". Replacements included Josie Lawrence as Anna, Keo Woolford as the King and Saeed Jaffrey as the Kralahome. The show closed on January 5, 2002. It toured the UK in 2002 and 2003, with Stefanie Powers and then Marti Webb as Anna and Ronobir Lahiri as the King.

=== 2004 to present ===
Another U.S. national tour began in mid-2004, directed by Baayork Lee (who appeared in the original production at age 5), with choreography by Susan Kikuchi, reproducing the Robbins original. Sandy Duncan again starred as Anna, while Martin Vidnovic played the King. He had played Lun Tha in the 1977 Broadway production and voiced the King in the 1999 animated film. Stefanie Powers took over for Duncan throughout 2005. Near the end of the tour in November 2005, Variety judged that Lee had successfully "harnessed the show's physical beauty and its intrinsic exotic flavor."

Jeremy Sams directed, and Kikuchi choreographed, a production in June 2009 at the Royal Albert Hall in London. It starred Maria Friedman and Daniel Dae Kim. A U.K. national tour starred Ramon Tikaram as the King and Josefina Gabrielle as Anna, directed by Paul Kerryson, with choreography by David Needham. It opened in December 2011 in Edinburgh and continued into May 2012. In June 2014, Théâtre du Châtelet in Paris presented an English-language production of The King and I directed by Lee Blakeley and choreographed by Peggy Hickey, with sets by Jean-Marc Puissant, costumes by Sue Blane and lighting by Rick Fisher, starring Susan Graham as Anna, Lambert Wilson as the King and Lisa Milne as Lady Thiang. The New York Times called it "a grand new staging that has set French critics searching for superlatives." In April 2016, this production transferred to Lyric Opera of Chicago featuring Kate Baldwin as Anna, Paolo Montalban as the King and Ali Ewoldt and was enthusiastically received by the critics.

The Renshaw production was revived again in April 2014 by Opera Australia for performances in Sydney, Melbourne and Brisbane, directed by Renshaw and featuring Lisa McCune and Teddy Tahu Rhodes. Some critics questioned anew the portrayal of the Siamese court as barbaric and asked why a show where "the laughs come from the Thai people mis-understanding British ... culture" should be selected for revival.

A Broadway revival began previews on March 12 and opened on April 16, 2015, at the Vivian Beaumont Theater. The production was directed by Bartlett Sher and starred Kelli O'Hara as Anna and Ken Watanabe, as the King. It featured Ruthie Ann Miles as Lady Thiang, Paul Nakauchi as the Kralahome, Ashley Park as Tuptim, Conrad Ricamora as Lun Tha, Jake Lucas as Louis, and Edward Baker-Duly as Sir Edward Ramsey. Choreography by Christopher Gattelli was based on the original Jerome Robbins dances. The designers included Michael Yeargan (sets), Catherine Zuber (costumes) and Donald Holder (lighting). Reviews were uniformly glowing, with Ben Brantley of The New York Times calling it a "resplendent production", praising the cast (especially O'Hara), direction, choreographer, designs and orchestra, and commenting that Sher "sheds a light [on the vintage material] that isn't harsh or misty but clarifying [and] balances epic sweep with intimate sensibility." The production was nominated for nine Tony Awards, winning four, including Best Revival of a Musical, Best Leading Actress (for O'Hara), Best Featured Actress (for Miles) and best costume design (for Zuber), and won the Drama Desk Award for Outstanding Revival. Replacements for the King included Llana Hoon Lee and Daniel Dae Kim. Replacements for Anna included Marin Mazzie. The revival closed on June 26, 2016, after 538 performances. A U.S. national tour of the production began in November 2016. The cast included Laura Michelle Kelly as Anna, Llana as the King and Joan Almedilla as Lady Thiang.

The production was reproduced at the London Palladium from June through September 2018. O'Hara and Watanabe reprised their roles, with Naoko Mori and Miles sharing the role of Lady Thiang, Na-Young Jeon as Tuptim, Dean John-Wilson as Lun Tha and Takao Osawa as the Kralahome. It was nominated for 6 Olivier Awards, including Best Musical Revival. The production was filmed and shown in theatres in late 2018. A tour of the same production began in February 2023 in the U.K. and Ireland, directed by Sher, choreographed by Gattelli and starring Darren Lee as the King and Helen George as Anna, with Dean John-Wilson as Lun Tha. The tour continued until January 2024, when the production moved into the Dominion Theatre in the West End and closed in March 2024.

The King and I continues to be a popular choice for productions by community theatres, school and university groups, summer camps and regional theatre companies.

== Adaptations ==
The musical was filmed in 1956 with Brynner re-creating his role opposite Deborah Kerr. The film was nominated for nine Academy Awards and won five, including Best Actor for Brynner, with Kerr nominated for Best Actress. Sharaff won for best costume design. The film was directed by Walter Lang (who was also nominated for an Oscar) and choreographed by Robbins. Marni Nixon dubbed the singing voice of Anna, and Rita Moreno played Tuptim. Saunders as Thiang, Adiarte as Chulalongkorn and Benson as the Kralahome reprised their stage roles, as did dancers Yuriko and de Lappe. Alan Mowbray appeared in the new role of the British Ambassador, while Sir Edward Ramsey (demoted to the Ambassador's aide) was played by Geoffrey Toone. The movie's script was faithful to the stage version, although it cut a few songs; reviews were enthusiastic. Thomas Hischak, in his The Rodgers and Hammerstein Encyclopedia, states: "It is generally agreed that the [movie] is the finest film adaptation of any R & H musical". Thai officials judged the film offensive to their monarchy and banned both film and musical in 1956.

A non-musical 1972 TV comedy series, starring Brynner, was broadcast in the U.S. by CBS but was cancelled in mid-season after 13 episodes. It followed the main storyline of the musical, focusing on the relationship between the title characters. Samantha Eggar played "Anna Owens", with Brian Tochi as Chulalongkorn, Keye Luke as the Kralahome, Eric Shea as Louis, Lisa Lu as Lady Thiang, and Rosalind Chao as Princess Serena. The first episode aired on September 17, 1972, and the last aired on December 31, 1972. Margaret Landon was unhappy with this series and charged the producers with "inaccurate and mutilated portrayals" of her literary property; she unsuccessfully sued for copyright infringement.

Jerome Robbins' Broadway was a Broadway revue, directed by Robbins, showcasing scenes from some of his most popular earlier works on Broadway. The show ran from February 1989 to September 1990 and won six Tony Awards, including best musical. It featured "Shall We Dance" and "The Small House of Uncle Thomas" ballet, with Kikuchi as Eliza. Yuriko was the choreographic "reconstruction assistant".

Rich Animation Studios, Morgan Creek Productions and Warner Bros. Pictures released a 1999 animated film adaptation of the musical. Except for using some of the songs and characters, the story is unrelated to the Rodgers and Hammerstein version. Geared towards children, the adaptation includes cuddly animals, including a dragon. Voices were provided by Miranda Richardson as Anna (speaking), Christiane Noll as Anna (singing), Martin Vidnovic as the King, Ian Richardson as the Kralahome and Adam Wylie as Louis. Hischak dislikes the film but praises the vocals, adding that one compensation of the film is hearing Barbra Streisand sing a medley of "I Have Dreamed", "We Kiss in a Shadow" and "Something Wonderful", which is borrowed from Streisand's 1985 The Broadway Album and played under the film's closing credits. He expressed surprise "that the Rodgers & Hammerstein Organization allowed it to be made" and noted that "children have enjoyed The King and I for five decades without relying on dancing dragons". Ted Chapin, president of that organization, has called the film his biggest mistake in granting permission for an adaptation.

Paramount Pictures and Temple Hill Entertainment have partnered with Concord to produce a modernized feature film adaptation.

== Music and recordings ==
=== Musical treatment ===
In his music, Rodgers sought to give some of the music an Asian flavor. This is exhibited in the piercing major seconds that frame "A Puzzlement", the flute melody in "We Kiss in a Shadow", open fifths, the exotic 6/2 chords that shape "My Lord and Master", and in some of the incidental music. The music for "The Small House of Uncle Thomas" was for the most part written not by Rodgers, but by dance music arranger Trude Rittmann, though "Hello, Young Lovers" and a snatch of "A Puzzlement" are quoted within it.

Before Rodgers and Hammerstein began writing together, the AABA form for show tunes was standard, but many of the songs in The King and I vary from it. "I Have Dreamed" is an almost continuous repetition of variations on the same theme, until the ending, when it is capped by another melody. The first five notes (an eighth note triplet and two half notes) of "Getting to Know You" also carry the melody all the way through the refrain. According to Mordden, this refusal to accept conventional forms "is one reason why their frequently heard scores never lose their appeal. They attend to situation and they unveil character, but also, they surprise you."

According to Rodgers' biographer William Hyland, the score for The King and I is much more closely tied to the action than that of South Pacific, "which had its share of purely entertaining songs". For example, the opening song, "I Whistle a Happy Tune", establishes Anna's fear upon entering a strange land with her small son, but the merry melody also expresses her determination to keep a stiff upper lip. Hyland calls "Hello, Young Lovers" an archetypical Rodgers ballad: simple, with only two chords in the first eight bars, but moving in its directness.

=== Recordings ===
The original cast recording of The King and I was released by Decca Records in 1951. While John Kenrick admires it for the performances of the secondary couple, Larry Douglas and Doretta Morrow, and for the warmth of Lawrence's performance, he notes that "Shall We Dance" was abridged, and there are no children's voices – the chorus in "Getting to Know You" is made up of adults. In 2000, the recording was inducted into the Grammy Hall of Fame. Later in the same year Patrice Munsel and Robert Merrill made the first studio recording of selections from the musical. Hischak comments that in the 1953 London cast album, Valerie Hobson's vocals were no stronger than Lawrence's and that the highlight is Muriel Smith's "Something Wonderful" in a disc with too many cuts. He calls Anna's songs "well served" by Marni Nixon's singing in the 1956 film soundtrack and judges the recording as vocally satisfying. Kenrick describes the film soundtrack as a "mixed bag": he is pleased that it includes several songs cut from the film, and he praises Nixon's vocals, but he dislikes the supporting cast and suggests watching the movie instead for its visual splendor.

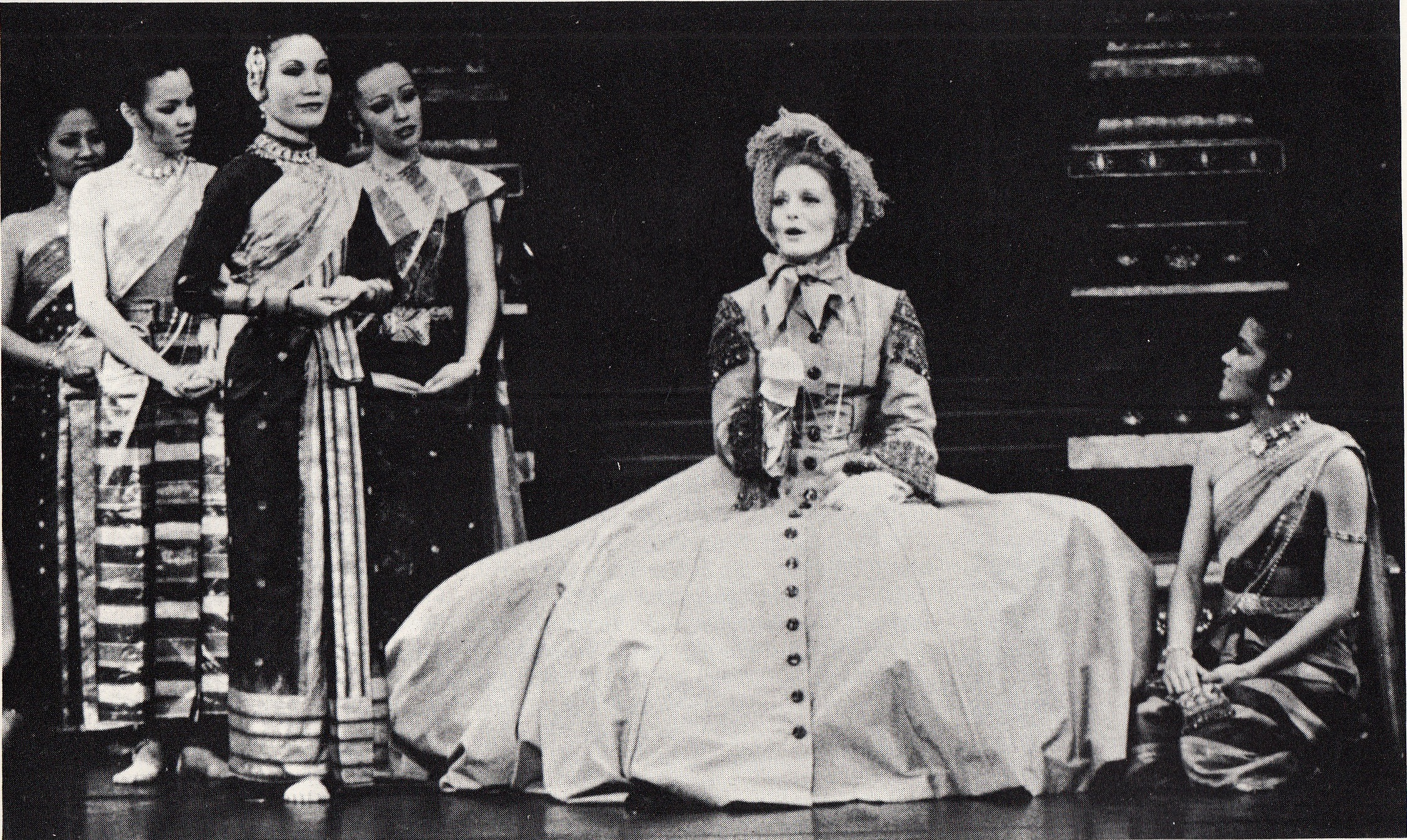
"Hello, Young Lovers", 1977 cast: Towers as Anna; June Angela as Tuptim at right; Hye-Young Choi as Lady Thiang in front of other wives at left

Kenrick prefers the 1964 Lincoln Center cast recording to the earlier ones, especially approving of the performances of Risë Stevens as Anna and Patricia Neway as Lady Thiang. The recording, for the first time, included the narrated ballet music for "The Small House of Uncle Thomas". Because a single LP limited a single-disc album to about fifty minutes, its inclusion required the absence of some of the other numbers. Kenrick finds the recording of the 1977 Broadway revival cast to be "[e]asily the most satisfying King & I on CD". He judges it to be Brynner's best performance, calling Towers "great" and Martin Vidnovic, June Angela and the rest of the supporting cast "fabulous", though lamenting the omission of the ballet. Hischak, in contrast, says that some might prefer Brynner in his earlier recordings, when he was "more vibrant". Kenrick enjoys the 1992 Angel studio recording mostly for the Anna of Julie Andrews, who he says is "pure magic" in a role she never performed on stage. Kenrick praises the performance of both stars on the 1996 Broadway revival recording, calling Lou Diamond Phillips "that rarity, a King who can stand free of Brynner's shadow". Hischak finds the soundtrack to the 1999 animated film with Christiane Noll as Anna and Martin Vidnovic as the King, as well as Barbra Streisand singing on one track, more enjoyable than the movie itself, but Kenrick writes that his sole use for that CD is as a coaster.

== Critical reception ==
Lawrence as Anna and Brynner as the King from "Shall We Dance?", 1951

Opening night reviews of the musical were strongly positive. Richard Watts in the New York Post termed it "[a]nother triumph for the masters". Critic John Mason Brown stated, "They have done it again." The New York Times drama critic Brooks Atkinson wrote: "This time Messrs. Rodgers and Hammerstein are not breaking any fresh trails, but they are accomplished artists of song and words in the theater; and The King and I is a beautiful and lovable musical play." Barely less enthusiastic was John Lardner in The New Yorker, who wrote, "Even those of us who find [the Rodgers and Hammerstein musicals] a little too unremittingly wholesome are bound to take pleasure in the high spirits and technical skill that their authors, and producers, have put into them." Otis Guernsey wrote for the New York Herald Tribune, "Musicals and leading men will never be the same after last night ... Brynner set an example that will be hard to follow ... Probably the best show of the decade.

The balance of opinion among the critics of the original London production was generally favorable, with a few reservations. In The Observer, Ivor Brown predicted that the piece would "settle down for some years at Drury Lane." The anonymous critic of The Times compared the work to Gilbert and Sullivan: "Mr. Rodgers charmingly echoes Sullivan in the king's more topsy-turvy moments; and Mr. Hammerstein attends very skilfully to the lurking Gilbertian humour." Less favorably, in the Daily Express, John Barber called the work "this treacle-bin Mikado", and declared that only one of the cast, Muriel Smith, could really sing.

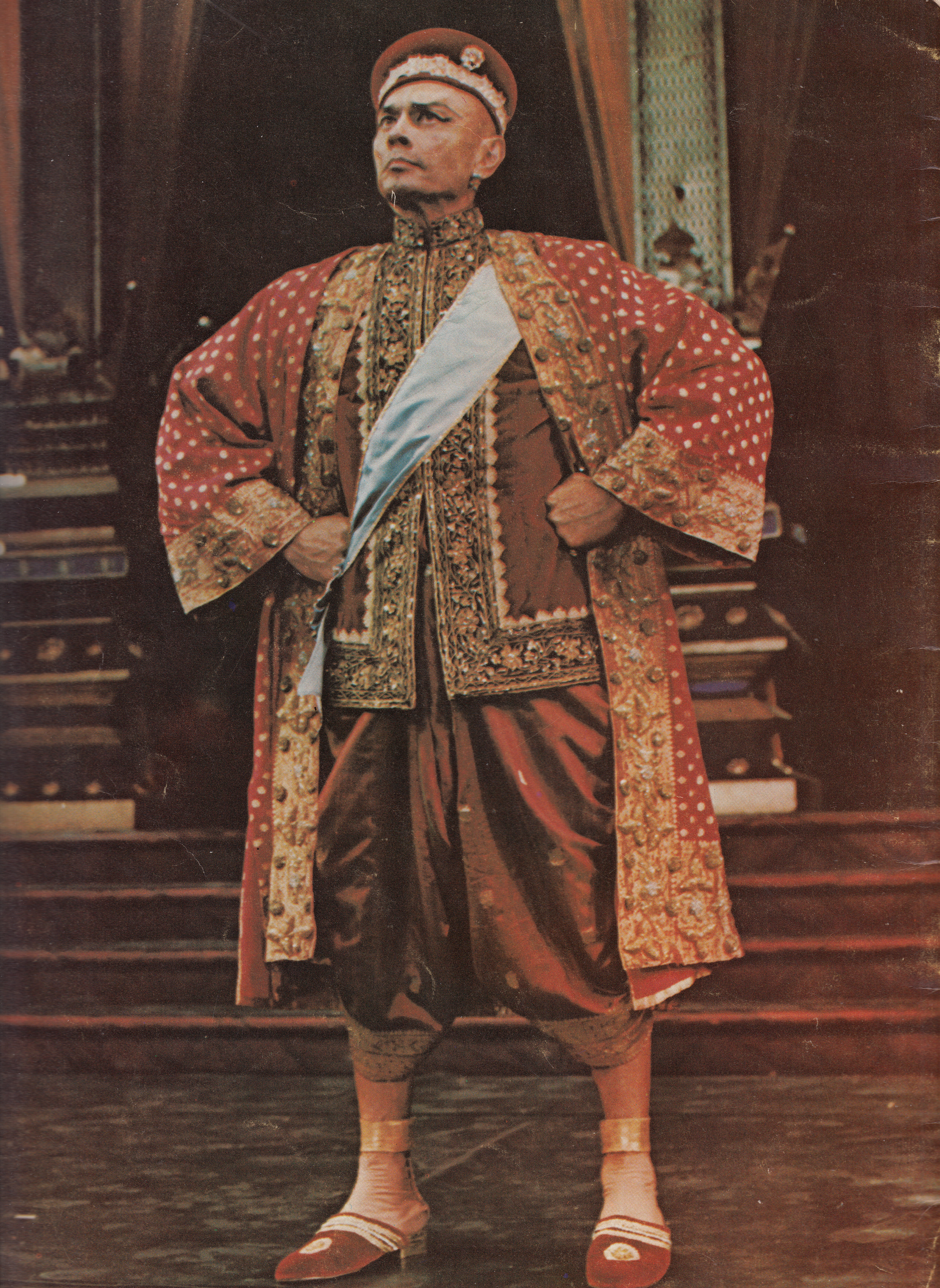
Brynner in the 1977 Broadway production

In 1963, New York Times reviewer Lewis Funke said of the musical, "Mr. Hammerstein put all of his big heart into the simple story of a British woman's adventures, heartaches, and triumphs. ... A man with a world-view, he seized the opportunity provided by [Landon's book] to underscore his thoughts on the common destiny of humanity." Fourteen years later, another Times reviewer, Clive Barnes, called the musical "unsophisticated and untroubled. Even its shadows are lightened with a laugh or a sweetly sentimental tear ... we can even be persuaded to take death as a happy ending".

The reworked 1996 Broadway production received mixed reviews. Vincent Canby of The New York Times disliked it: "This latest King and I might look like a million dollars as a regional production; on Broadway ... it's a disappointment. The score remains enchanting but, somewhere along the line, there has been a serious failure of the theatrical imagination." But Liz Smith enthused: "The King and I is perfect"; and the Houston Chronicle wrote, of the subsequent tour, "The King and I is the essence of musical theater, an occasion when drama, music, dance and decor combine to take the audience on an unforgettable journey." Critic Richard Christiansen in the Chicago Tribune observed, of a 1998 tour stop at the Auditorium Theatre: "Written in a more leisurely and innocent and less politically correct period, [The King and I] cannot escape the 1990s onus of its condescending attitude toward the pidgin English monarch and his people. And its story moves at a pace that's a mite too slow for this more hurried day and age." When the production reached London in 2000, however, it received uniformly positive reviews; the Financial Times called it "a handsome, spectacular, strongly performed introduction to one of the truly great musicals".

The 2015 Broadway revival initially received uniformly glowing reviews. Ben Brantley of The New York Times called it a "resplendent production" and commented:

[In the] 1996 production ... [a] dark strain of sadomasochistic tension born of Victorian repression and Eastern sensuality was introduced into sunny Siam. ... Mr. Sher is no strong-armed revisionist. He works from within vintage material, coaxing shadowy emotional depths to churn up a surface that might otherwise seem shiny and slick. ... [T]he show is both panoramic and personal, balancing dazzling musical set pieces with sung introspective soliloquies. [The direction] enhances [scenes'] emotional weight. No one is merely a dancer or an extra or an archetype, which may be the greatest defense this show offers against what can come across as cute condescension toward the exotic East. ... [The] portrayal of the varied forms and content of love [and] some of [Rodgers and Hammerstein's] lushest ballads ... acquire freshening nuance and anchoring conviction".

Marilyn Stasio, in Variety, termed the production "sumptuous" and "absolutely stunning". She noted a "still pertinent theme: the dissonant dynamic when Western civilization tries to assert its values on ancient Eastern cultures." In USA Today, Elysa Gardner wrote of the grins and tears evoked by the production. "[W]atching these people from vastly different cultures carefully but joyfully reach for common ground ... can be almost unbearably moving. ... [Rodgers and Hammerstein's] textured humanity and appeals for tolerance, like their shimmering scores, only gain resonance as time passes." The production's attempts to achieve historical accuracy and explore the work's dark themes with a modern sensibility led some reviewers to conclude that it succeeds at converting the musical's orientalism into "a modern critique of racism and sexism". Other commentators, however, such as composer Mohammed Fairouz, argued that an attempt at sensitivity in production cannot compensate for "the inaccurate portrayal of the historic King Mongkut as a childlike tyrant and the infantilization of the entire Siamese population of the court", which demonstrate a racist subtext in the piece, even in 1951 when it was written. Benjamin Ivry opined that "the Rodgers and Hammerstein organization should shelve the [musical] as a humanitarian gesture toward Southeast Asian history and art".

Fifty years after its premiere, Rodgers biographer Meryle Secrest summed up the musical:

The King and I is really a celebration of love in all its guises, from the love of Anna for her dead husband; the love of the King's official wife, Lady Thiang, for a man she knows is flawed and also unfaithful; the desperation of forbidden love; and a love that is barely recognized and can never be acted upon.
