= The King and I (1953 London cast album) =

- US-release sleeve of the 1953 London cast LP

Cast recording by Rodgers and Hammerstein
- Released: 1953; 73 years ago
- Labels: Philips Records (UK); Stet Records (US)

The London cast album of The King and I by Rodgers and Hammerstein was issued in 1953 with Valerie Hobson as Anna and Herbert Lom as the King and featuring Muriel Smith as Lady Thiang, with Doreen Duke and Jan Mazarus as Tuptim and Lun Tha. The record was issued in the UK on Philips Records (BBL 7002 with a mauve framed turquoise and white design LP sleeve), and by Stet Records in the US (DS 15014 with a flame pink-bordered white and red design LP sleeve).

The musical premiered on Broadway in 1951 starring Gertrude Lawrence, in her last stage role, and Yul Brynner. The original Broadway cast recording was released the same year. The original London production opened on October 8, 1953, at the Theatre Royal, Drury Lane, and was warmly received, running for 946 performances. The cast featured Hobson, also in her last role, as Anna; Lom as the King, Smith as Lady Thiang, Duke as Tuptim and Mazarus as Lun Tha. Thomas Hischak, in his The Rodgers and Hammerstein Encyclopedia comments, "The 1953 London cast recording is less complete than the Broadway one, and Valerie Hobson's Anna is no stronger a singer than Lawrence. Herbert Lom talk-sings as Brynner [did]".

== Track list ==
1. Overture – 6:36
2. I Whistle a Happy Tune – 2:42
3. My Lord and Master – 2:10
4. Hello, Young Lovers – 3:28
5. March of the Royal Siamese Children – 3:24
6. A Puzzlement – 3:28
7. Getting to Know You – 5:00
8. We Kiss In a Shadow – 2:38
9. Shall I Tell You What I Think of You? – 3:38
10. Something Wonderful – 3:11
11. I Have Dreamed – 2:21
12. Shall We Dance? – 3:17
