= Rasputin and the Empress =

1932 film

- Theatrical release poster
- Directed by: Richard Boleslawski Charles Brabin (uncredited)
- Written by: Charles MacArthur
- Produced by: Bernard H. Hyman; Irving Thalberg
- Starring: John Barrymore; Ethel Barrymore; Lionel Barrymore; Ralph Morgan
- Cinematography: William H. Daniels
- Edited by: Tom Held
- Music by: Herbert Stothart
- Production company: Metro-Goldwyn-Mayer
- Distributed by: Loew's Inc.
- Release date: December 23, 1932
- Running time: 121 minutes
- Country: United States
- Language: English
- Budget: $1,022,000
- Box office: $1,379,000

Rasputin and the Empress is a 1932 American pre-Code historical drama film directed by Richard Boleslawski and written by Charles MacArthur. Produced by Metro-Goldwyn-Mayer (MGM), the film is set in Imperial Russia and stars the Barrymore siblings (John, as Prince Chegodieff; Ethel, as Czarina Alexandra; and Lionel Barrymore, as Grigori Rasputin). It is the only film in which all three siblings appear together.

The film's inaccurate portrayal of Prince Felix Yusupov and his wife Princess Irina (renamed "Prince Chegodieff" and "Princess Natasha") resulted in a historically significant lawsuit against MGM and gave rise to the "all persons fictitious disclaimer", which has since become standard in Hollywood works of fiction.

== Plot ==
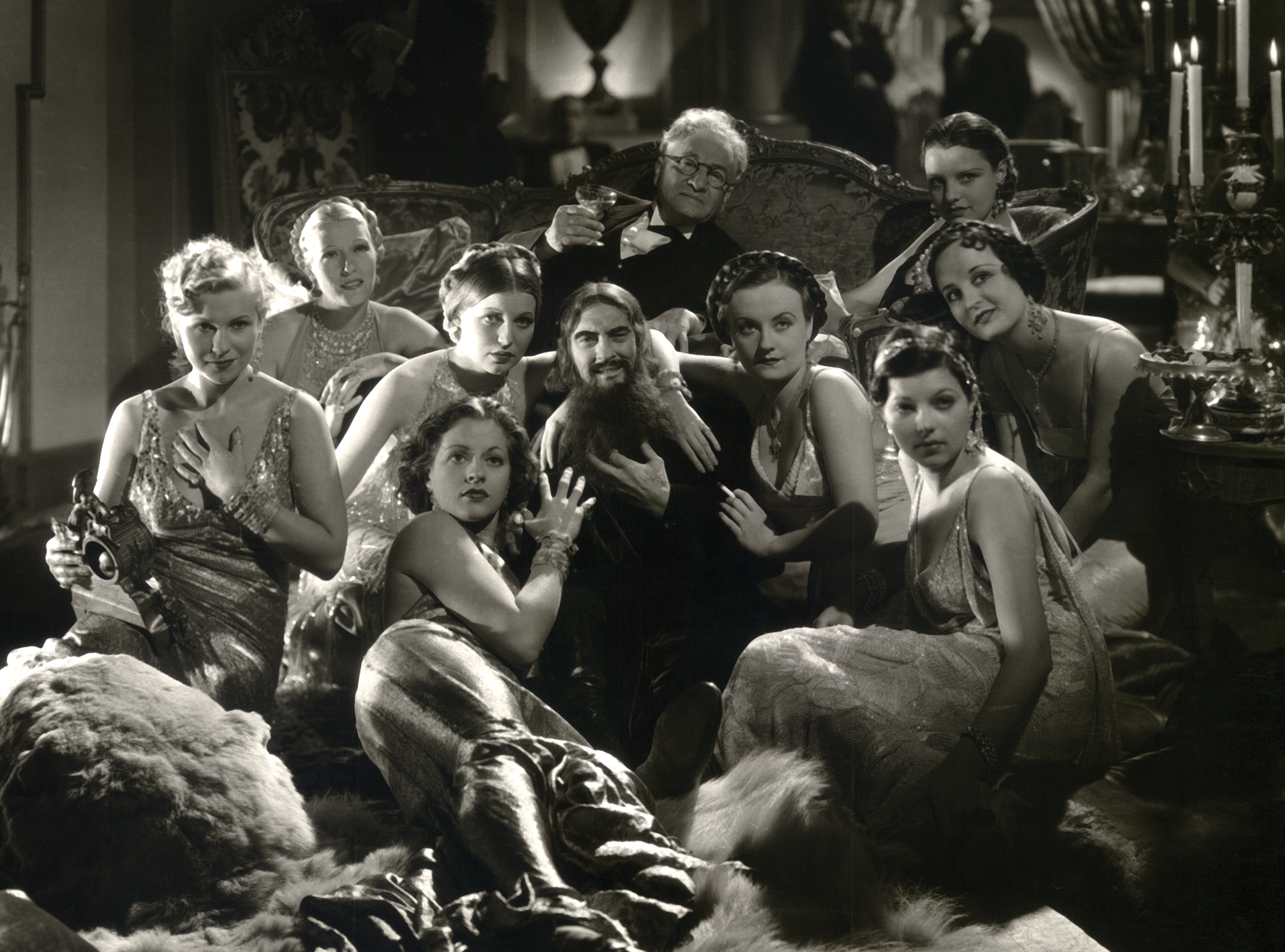
Lionel Barrymore (center) as Rasputin

The highly fictionalized story takes place in the Russian Empire during the last years of the reign of Czar Nicholas II and the Czarina Alexandra. Reform-minded Prince Paul has long been concerned about the plight of the common people and knows a revolution is brewing. Prince Alexei, heir to the throne, is loved by the people but has hemophilia, and a slight fall turns out to be life-threatening. When royal physician Dr. Remezov is powerless to stop the boy's bleeding, Princess Natasha, Alexandra's lady-in-waiting and Paul's fiancée, recommends Rasputin as a healer. He convinces the frantic Empress that he has been sent by God to cure the child. Left alone with Alexei, he hypnotizes the boy and relieves his agony but also gradually makes Alexei a slave to his will.

With the influence he now wields over the relieved parents, Rasputin begins replacing those loyal to them with his own men. He is greatly aided when the head of the secret police, fearful of losing his job over his failure to prevent the assassination of a nobleman close to the Czar, turns to him for help. With police dossiers at his disposal, Rasputin is able to use blackmail to increase his power even further.

Prince Paul fears that Rasputin's actions will bring about the downfall of the empire. However, even Natasha believes in Rasputin. She warns him that Paul is going to try to kill him. Paul shoots him, but Rasputin is unharmed: he has taken the precaution of wearing a hidden metal breastplate. Nicholas forces Paul to resign his position when he admits he tried to assassinate the man.

When Germany issues an ultimatum demanding that Russia cease mobilizing its army over the crisis between Austria-Hungary and Serbia, Nicholas and his advisers are divided. Rasputin convinces him to reject the ultimatum, leading to World War I.

Finally, Rasputin begins to make subtle advances on Grand Duchess Maria, Alexandra's daughter. When Natasha finds out, she becomes furious and shouts that she will go to the Empress. Rasputin overpowers her and puts her in a deep trance. The Empress fortuitously enters the room at that moment, enabling Natasha to recover her wits and tell what she saw. When he is unable to shake Alexandra's faith in Natasha, Rasputin boasts of how he is now effectively Czar. In despair, the Empress sends for Paul. He assures her that he knows what to do.

At a big party where Rasputin is guest of honor, he recognizes the servant who has been bringing him his favorite traditional Tobolsk cakes all night; he used to work for Paul. Rasputin has the house searched. They find Paul and Dr. Remezov. Rasputin is eager to dispatch his most implacable enemy himself; he takes Paul into the cellar at gunpoint. Once they are alone, Paul taunts Rasputin, telling him the cakes were filled with poison. He then leaps at Rasputin and beats him into unconsciousness. However, Rasputin refuses to die. Covered with blood, he rises and walks toward Paul, shouting that if he dies, Russia will die. Paul finally drags him out into the snow and throws him into the river to drown. Alexei is freed from his hypnotic trance and hugs his mother. Nicholas is forced to exile Paul, as Rasputin's minions are still in power. However, the old charlatan's last prophecy comes true as the Czar is overthrown and we hear the gunfire as he is and his entire family are shot by the Bolsheviks.

At the end, a light blazes behind a cross accompanied by the Russian National anthem, but the choir sings the English hymn that concludes “Give Us Peace in Our Time, Oh Lord.”

== Cast ==
- John Barrymore as Prince Paul Chegodieff
- Ethel Barrymore as Czarina Alexandra
- Lionel Barrymore as Grigori Rasputin
- Ralph Morgan as Czar Nicholas II
- Diana Wynyard as Princess Natasha
- Tad Alexander as Czarevitch Alexis 'Alyosha'
- C. Henry Gordon as Grand Duke Igor
- Edward Arnold as Dr A. Remezov
- Henry Armetta as Photographer (uncredited)
- Nigel De Brulier as Priest (uncredited)
- Henry Kolker as Chief of Secret Police (uncredited)
- Frank Reicher as German-Language Teacher (uncredited)

== Background ==
The impetus for making the film was Irving Thalberg's discovery that the studio already owned the rights to Alfred Klabund's 1927 novel Rasputin. In June 1932, MGM had announced that the three Barrymores would star in the movie. This film marked Ethel Barrymore's sound film debut and is the earliest known recording of her famous voice.

That is the only film which features all three Barrymore siblings - John, Ethel and Lionel - together; although all had starring roles, there are only a few short scenes where all three are on the screen at the same time.

"I gradually learned that this was an unusually disorganized company, and it was a miracle that the film ever got finished–no script except for one day ahead; the three Barrymores, who were tough enough to take individually, together they spelled disaster," wrote Barbara Barondess in her memoir. This was her first talking film. "I rehearsed the scene without a hitch. But the strong Klieg lights were killers. They were blinding and very hot, and the confinement of the chalk marks for the camera were something new to me. The size of the stage, the crew, the soundmen, property men, lighting men, make-up men, hairdressers, script girls, and dozens of assistants, photographers, and all those people fussing and stopping every shot were absolutely devastating. The lights bothered me the most. I was sure that I would photograph blind. Registering rage and hysteria in the second scene not difficult!"

== Reception ==
Mordaunt Hall's review for The New York Times describes the picture as an engrossing and exciting cinematic melodrama. Hall was distinguished by the wise guidance of Richard Boleslavsky… When Lionel Barrymore, who plays Rasputin, who he described as being the most dramatic character. The reviewer had very positive reactions of the actors performance, and besides what he thought were the experienced and talented performances of the Barrymores, Hall thought Ralph Morgan gave an unusually accurate portrayal of Czar Nicholas. He thought Lionel Barrymore left a good performance of the repulsive monk.

Hall wrote a longer piece for the Sunday, January 8, 1933, edition of The New York Times.

In April 1933, Bruce Bevlin of the New Republic called it a “historical perversion.”

In the February 1933 issue of Vanity Fair, Pare Lorentz panned it: “It is a clumsy, pretentious, aimless motion picture—self-conscious and stilted from beginning to end and an obvious circus stunt at the expense of a famous name.”

Rotten Tomatoes gives the film a score of 50%, based on 6 reviews.

The film grossed a total (domestic and foreign) of $1,379,000: $677,000 from the US and Canada and $702,000 elsewhere, resulting in a loss of $185,000.

This film was nominated for Best Story at the 6th Academy Awards.

== Lawsuit ==
The model for Princess Natasha was Princess Irina Yusupov, wife of Felix Yusupov, one of Grigori Rasputin's actual murderers. Attorney Fanny Holtzmann filed a lawsuit by Yusupov against MGM in 1933, claiming invasion of privacy and libel. The film portrays her as a victim of Rasputin, and it is implied that he raped her, which never happened. She won an award of $127,373 in an English court and an out-of-court settlement with MGM, reportedly of $250,000, in New York. As a preventive measure against further lawsuits, the film was taken out of distribution for decades.

The all persons fictitious disclaimer in the credits of most Hollywood films is a result of the lawsuit. The offending scene was removed, which renders Wynyard's character somewhat incomprehensible unless the audience is aware of the edit: in the first half of the film, Princess Natasha is a supporter of Rasputin, and in the second half, she is terrified of him for no given reason. The LaserDisc release includes the original theatrical trailer, which contains a portion of this deleted scene.

== Cartoon caricature ==
The Barrymores are all caricatured in the Mickey Mouse cartoon Mickey's Gala Premiere (1933), costumed as they appear in this movie.

== See also ==
- List of films about the Romanovs
- Lionel Barrymore filmography
