= Terry Saunders =

American actress

- Died: 2011
- Occupations: Actress and Singer
- Years active: 1942–1972
- Known for: The King And I
- Spouses: George Vance McBryde (m. 1949; div. 1955); James Hurst (m. 1958; div. 1964)
- Children: 1

Terry Saunders, born Sadie Termini, was a film and Broadway performer.

== Early years ==
Saunders was born and educated in Brooklyn. Her girlfriends in high school created her stage name because they felt that she would not achieve success if she used her birth name.

== Career ==
Saunders began performing on stage when she was 18 years old. She later played Lady Thiang in the film and stage versions of The King And I, first as a replacement on Broadway, then in the film, performing the song "Something Wonderful" in both. Saunders had five other roles on Broadway.When she performed in Follies on Broadway she added tap dancing to her repertoire.

Works in which Saunders appeared in regional theater included The Merry Widow in Vancouver, British Columbia, and Rose Marie in Kansas City.

On television, Saunders appeared on The American Musical Theatre and Tonight and with Steve Allen. She guest starred on an episode of Make Room For Daddy.

Saunders performed as a guest vocalist with civic orchestras, including the Chicago Symphony Orchestra, the Cleveland Orchestra, the Hollywood Bowl Orchestra, and the Philadelphia Orchestra. She gave a recital in Carnegie Hall.

== Personal life and death ==
On Sunday, November 5, 1949, at the First Presbyterian Church of Fayetteville, North Carolina, Saunders was married to actor and Fayetteville native, George Vance McBryde. On May 16, 1955, following a two-year separation, the couple was divorced.

By 1958, Saunders had remarried, this time to actor/singer James Hurst, whom she had met the previous summer, when both appeared in a revival of Show Boat at Kansas City's Starlight Theatre. They had a daughter, Sheryl (born in 1959), whom she lived with until her death. Saunders and Hurst divorced in 1964.

Saunders died in 2011.

== Filmography ==
Year	Title	Role	Notes
1956	The King And I	Lady Thiang	

== Stage ==
Year	Title	Role(s)	Venue	Notes	Ref.
1942	The Time, The Place and the Girl	ensemble	Mansfield Theatre	Broadway debut	
1944	Bloomer Girl	Delia (replacement)	Shubert Theatre		
1950	Kiss Me, Kate	Lilli Vanessi/ Katherine	Pittsburgh Civic Light Opera		
1950	Roberta	Stephanie, the assistant to Roberta	Pittsburgh Civic Light Opera		
1951	Show Boat	Julie	Pittsburgh Civic Light Opera		
1951	Music in the Air	Marthe, understudy Frieda Hatfield	Ziegfeld Theatre		
1954	The King and I	Lady Thiang (replacement)	St. James Theatre		
1954	The King and I	Lady Thiang	US tour		
1960	Damn Yankees	Meg	San Bernardino Civic Light Opera		
1962	Milk and Honey	Ruth (replacement)	Martin Beck Theatre		
1963	Milk and Honey	Ruth	US & Canada tour		
1966	Show Boat	Julie	Pittsburgh Civic Light Opera		
1972	Follies	Christine Crane (replacement)	Winter Garden Theatre		
1972	Follies	Meredith Lane, standby Phyllis Rogers Stone, standby Carlotta Campion	US tour		
1974	Bitter Sweet	Manon	The Muny		
1976	The King and I	Lady Thiang	US tour		
1978	Damn Yankees	Meg	The Muny		
1978	The Sound of Music	Mother Abbess	US tour		

== TV ==
1956 The Danny Thomas Show

Season 4 episode 11. My fair vocal coach

Plays Elaine Bunson
