= Dorothy Sarnoff =

American actress

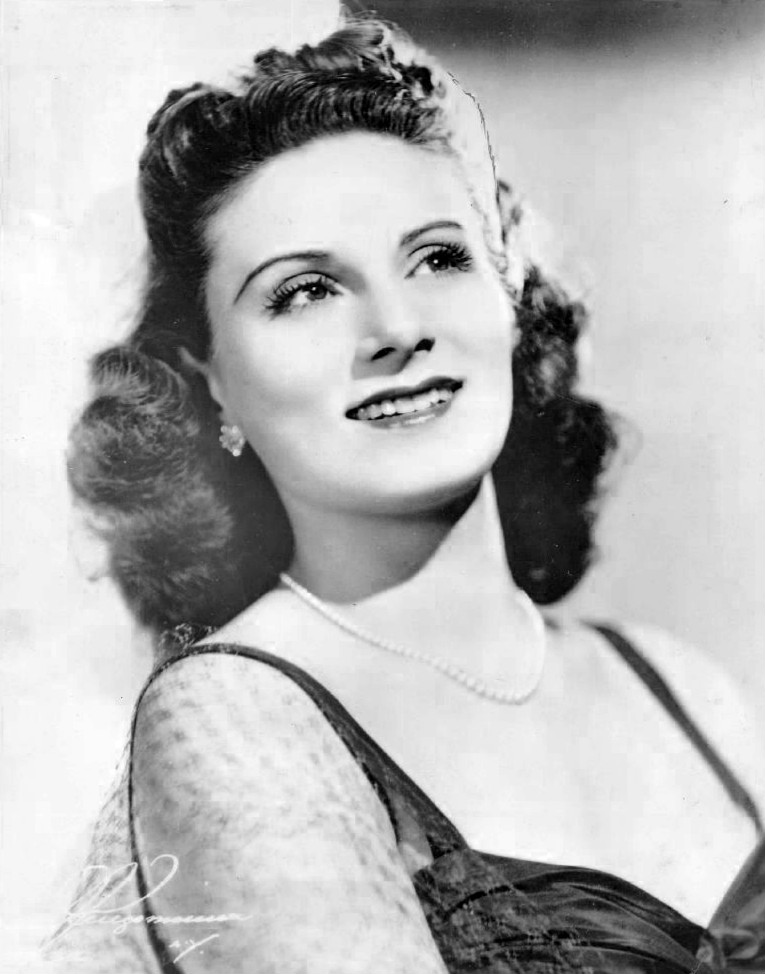
Sarnoff in 1942.

Dorothy Sarnoff (May 25, 1914 – December 20, 2008) was an American operatic soprano, musical theatre actress, and self-help guru. She had an active performing career from the late 1930s through the 1950s, during which time she sang in several operas with the New York City Opera and created several roles on Broadway, most notably Lady Thiang in the original 1951 cast of Rodgers and Hammerstein’s The King and I.

After her performing career ended she launched a second highly successful career as an image consultant to business executives, politicians, and other public figures. Her personal client list included many notable figures, including U.S. president Jimmy Carter, Israeli prime minister Menachem Begin, best-selling author Danielle Steel, and designer Paloma Picasso. She wrote a number of self-help books.

== Biography ==
=== Birth and education ===
Sarnoff was born in Brooklyn. She graduated from the Berkeley Institute in 1931 and attended Cornell University, where she studied English and public speaking. As a participant in the school's glee club, she developed an interest in singing, and traveled to France for vocal training after receiving her bachelor's degree in 1935. She later studied singing in New York City with Queena Mario, Florence Easton, and Ettore Verna.

=== Opera and Broadway ===
Back in the United States, Sarnoff performed with the NBC Symphony Orchestra and the St. Louis Municipal Opera. She sang the role of Miss Pinkerton in the 1939 world premiere at New York City's Radio City Music Hall of the one-act radio opera The Old Maid and the Thief by Gian Carlo Menotti. She reached the finals of the Auditions of the Air talent competition run by the Metropolitan Opera, which helped her land a contract with the Philadelphia Opera Company (POC).

She made her debut with the POC on January 13, 1942 as Antonia in Les contes d'Hoffmann. She sang several more roles with the company over the next three months, including Mimì in La bohème, Rosalinde in Johann Strauss II's Die Fledermaus, and Gracieuse in the world premiere of Deems Taylor's Ramuntcho. She later sang Marguerite in Charles Gounod's Faust with the Philadelphia La Scala Opera Company in 1946.

In October 1942 Sarnoff made her Broadway debut in the title role of Rosalinda, the New Opera Company’s long-running English-language version of Die Fledermaus that had been adapted by Erich Wolfgang Korngold. Sarnoff appeared in more than 500 performances of the production.

In 1945 she made her debut with the New York City Opera portraying the title role in Puccini's Tosca. She sang several more roles with the company over the next three seasons, including Marguerite, Mimì, Nedda in Ruggero Leoncavallo's Pagliacci, and Micaela in Georges Bizet's Carmen.

Sarnoff returned to Broadway in 1948 as Maria in the short-lived musical Magdalena. The production was notably the first work by composer Heitor Villa-Lobos to be mounted on Broadway. The year 1951 proved to be a banner year for Sarnoff when she portrayed Lady Thiang in the original Broadway cast of Rodgers and Hammerstein’s The King and I. As the king's head wife she introduced the classic song "Something Wonderful" and the song "Western People Funny". Apparently actor Yul Brynner, who played the King of Siam, taught her how to tense her abdominal muscles as a means of dealing with nervousness.

Her last role on Broadway was Jessica Farrow, a plantation owner’s daughter, in My Darlin' Aida, a 1952 musical based on the Giuseppe Verdi's opera Aida that transplanted the stories setting from ancient Egypt to Memphis, Tennessee during the American Civil War. The production starred Elaine Malbin in the title role and closed after just 89 performances.

=== Speech instruction ===
While having dinner with a publisher in the mid-1960s, she bemoaned the focus in women's magazines on beauty and clothing and was encouraged to pursue the subject of vocal quality. She started a program called "Speech Cosmetics", charging $25 for a sequence of six classes at the Alexander's department store in which women could learn to become better public speakers.

A first semester was offered in October 1965 and a second semester in January 1966 featured both afternoon and evening sessions. The curriculum focused on helping women learn to improve the defects in their speech while emphasizing and highlighting what's attractive. The key phrase she used throughout the course was "sing a song of sixpence, a pocketful of rye", which contains what she described as the worst elements in the New York dialect, the "ng" sound and the mispronunciation of single vowels as diphthongs.

The program relocated to Manhattan's St. Moritz Hotel, with correspondingly higher prices for the course. This evolved into Speech Dynamics, which aimed to develop all aspects of personal presentation. Individual customers were paying $1,000 for her coaching sessions by the mid-1970s and she was receiving $2,000 per lecture. Her firm was purchased by Ogilvy & Mather in 1974, after the advertising agency sent two of its executives for training. Ogilvy & Mather proceeded to aggressively promote Sarnoff.

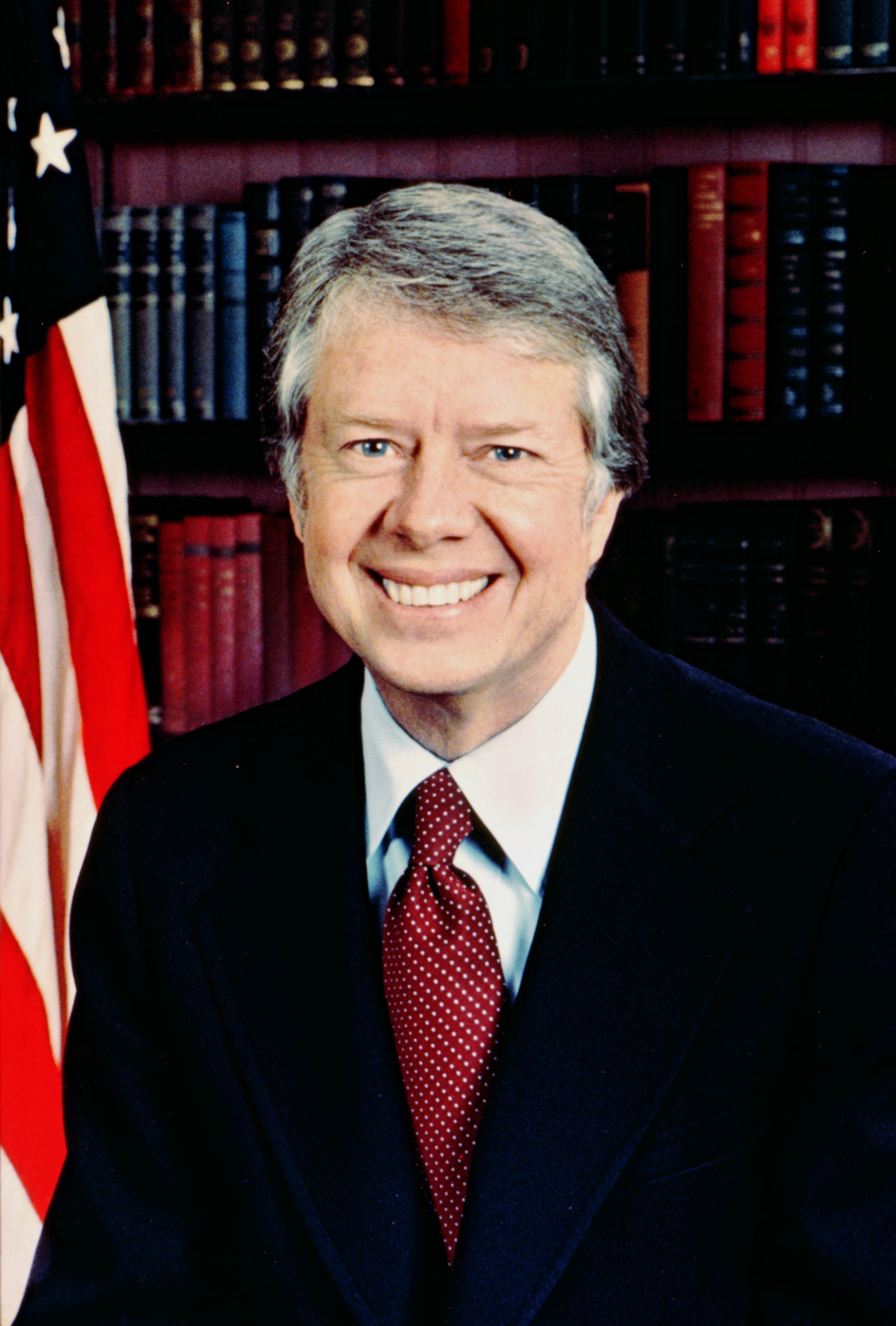
Sarnoff taught Jimmy Carter to "lower the wattage of his smile".

Speech Dynamics started with participants making a four-minute speech to Sarnoff focusing on their positive qualities. After listening to a recording of their speech, they would then identify the aspects of their speech that they would want to change and improve. Sarnoff would help address awkward mannerisms and eye movements and help improve posture and makeup. Her copyrighted mantra — "I'm glad I'm here" — was aimed at helping clients project the vibes of joy, concern and authority. as described by The New York Times in its obituary. Sarnoff "managed to combine the high tone of a traditional finishing school with the brand-building ethos of corporate consultancy".

Her clients included Prime Minister of Israel Menachem Begin, whom she helped to soften his demeanor; President Jimmy Carter, whom she instructed to tone down his smile; and United States Secretary of State Warren Christopher, whom she assisted to cut down on his blinking. She emphasized to her clients promoting books that they should mention the title of their work at least five to seven times in every interview.

She wrote several books, including 1970's Speech Can Change Your Life, Make the Most of Your Best in 1981 and Never be Nervous Again in 1987.

== Marriages ==
In 1957, she married Milton H. Raymond, an advertising executive. Her first marriage, to Dr. Shepard G. Aronson, ended in divorce. Both unions were childless and she left no immediate survivors.

== Death ==
Sarnoff died at age 94 on December 20, 2008 in her Manhattan home.
