= Something Wonderful (Carmen McRae album) =

Studio album by Carmen McRae
- Released: 1963
- Recorded: June 11 and July 22, 1962
- Genre: Traditional pop; Broadway
- Length: 35:50
- Label: Columbia
- Producer: Teo Macero

Carmen McRae chronology
Take Five Live (1962)	Something Wonderful (1963)	Live at Sugar Hill (1963)

Something Wonderful is a 1963 studio album by jazz singer Carmen McRae, arranged/conducted by Buddy Bregman and produced by Teo Macero. It was released on vinyl LP on Columbia Records. The album is a tribute to the various female lead singers in Broadway musicals.

== Critical reception ==
Professional ratings
Review scores
Source	Rating
AllMusic	4/5 stars
The Encyclopedia of Popular Music	3/5 stars

A Billboard reviewer wrote: "Now soft and tender, now bright and brassy but always her distinctive self, Carmen McRae salutes "Great Moments on Broadway" in this album, spotlighting show tunes made famous by Ethel Merman, Ella Logan, Mary Martin, et al. At no time is Carmen merely "imitative," and her 18 tunes–and 18 switches of mood–are her own. Fine wax."

Music critic Will Friedwald noted that "tracks are frustratingly brief (as is the set as a whole); what's more, the Bregman charts are serviceable but uninspired. Still, McRae's singing doesn't disappoint, and any concept that gives her the chance to sing such excellent songs as "Long Before I Knew You"is to be enjoyed. Show buffs will take delight in hearing rare songs from flop productions with terrific scores: All-American, Nowhere to Go but Up, and, best of all, "How Does the Wine Taste?", which McRae sings with so much vivacity you can practically taste the wine yourself."

== Track listing ==
1. "Blow, Gabriel, Blow / All Through the Night / Anything Goes" (Cole Porter) – 4:47 (salute to Ethel Merman)
2. "Long Before I Knew You / Just in Time" (Jule Styne, Betty Comden, Adolph Green) – 3:20 (salute to Judy Holliday)
3. "Come Rain or Come Shine" (Harold Arlen, Johnny Mercer) – 2:22 (salute to Pearl Bailey)
4. "If This Isn't Love / Look to the Rainbow / That Great Come and Get It Day" (Yip Harburg, Burton Lane) – 3:56 (salute to Ella Logan)
5. "A Wonderful Guy" (Richard Rodgers, Oscar Hammerstein II) – 1:12 (salute to Mary Martin)
6. "Don't Cry / I Like Ev'rybody / Warm All Over" (Frank Loesser) – 5:12 (salute to Jo Sullivan)
7. "Give a Little, Get a Little / There Never Was a Baby Like My Baby" (Jule Styne, Betty Comden, Adolph Green) – 3:42 (salute to Dolores Gray)
8. "Getting to Know You / Hello Young Lovers / Something Wonderful" (Richard Rodgers, Oscar Hammerstein II) – 3:54 (salute to Gertrude Lawrence)
