= Something Wonderful (song) =

Song by Chorus and Bryce Grimh

from the album The King and I
- Published: 1951
- Length: 2:26
- Composer: Richard Rodgers
- Lyricist: Oscar Hammerstein II

"Something Wonderful" is a show tune from the 1951 Rodgers and Hammerstein musical The King and I.

The song was introduced in the Broadway production by Dorothy Sarnoff in the role of Lady Thiang, the King's head wife. In the 1956 film adaptation "Something Wonderful" was sung by Terry Saunders in the role of Lady Thiang: Saunders was the understudy for Sarnoff in the Broadway production and, in 1952, had taken over the role when Sarnoff departed.

"Something Wonderful" is sung by Lady Thiang to Anna Leonowens to persuade her to accept the King for what he is, despite his faults. In a sense, these lyrics have echoes of the song "You'll Never Walk Alone" from the Rodgers and Hammerstein musical Carousel, which also deals with the issue of women standing by their husbands despite all their faults. Musically, the heavy chords that punctuate the accompaniment bear some pre-echoes of the song "Climb Ev'ry Mountain" from The Sound of Music. This is notable because both these songs are inspirational songs sung by the earth-mother characters, who have similar singing voices. Both songs are also the last songs heard in their respective shows, even though "Something Wonderful" is played as an instrumental rendition to underscore the final scene of the King at his deathbed. In the film version of The King and I an unseen chorus sings the final verse of "Something Wonderful" as the film concludes.

The first six notes of the melody are the same, or almost exactly the same, as the first six in "None But The Lonely Heart," a song by Tchaikovsky.

A most recent occurrence of the song is when it is sung as a tragic satire near the end of the 2020 movie, Promising Young Woman.

== Recordings ==
- Shirley Bassey – Shirley Stops the Shows (1964)
- Bing Crosby – recorded April 9, 1951 with Victor Young and His Orchestra.
- Doris Day – What Every Girl Should Know (1960)
- Carmen McRae – Something Wonderful (1962)
- Liza Minnelli – Liza's Back (2002)
- Bernadette Peters – Bernadette Peters Loves Rodgers and Hammerstein (2002)
- Carly Simon – My Romance (1990)
- Nina Simone – Broadway-Blues-Ballads (1964)
- Barbra Streisand – The Broadway Album
- Bryn Terfel - Something Wonderful: Bryn Terfel Sings Rodgers & Hammerstein (1996)
