= Malice in Wonderland (1985 film) =

- DVD cover featuring Elizabeth Taylor and Jane Alexander
- Genre: Biography; Comedy; Drama
- Based on: Hedda and Louella: A Dual Biography of Hedda Hopper and Louella Parsons by George Eells
- Screenplay by: Jacqueline Feather; David Seidler
- Directed by: Gus Trikonis
- Starring: Elizabeth Taylor; Jane Alexander
- Music by: Charles Bernstein
- Country of origin: United States
- Original language: English

Production
- Executive producer: Judith A. Polone
- Producer: Jay Benson
- Production location: Los Angeles
- Cinematography: Philip H. Lathrop
- Editor: Allan Jacobs
- Running time: 94 minutes 120 minutes (with commercials)
- Production company: Incorporated Television Company

Original release
- Network: CBS
- Release: May 12, 1985

Malice in Wonderland is a 1985 American made-for-television biographical film based on the 1972 novel Hedda and Louella: A Dual Biography of Hedda Hopper and Louella Parsons by George Eells. Starring Elizabeth Taylor and Jane Alexander, it tells the based-on-real-life stories of powerful Hollywood gossip columnists Hedda Hopper and Louella Parsons, once friends and later rivals. The film premiered on CBS on 12 May 1985. The film was a ratings success gaining an 18.3 rating equaling to 15,536,700 households tuning in its original air date.

== Cast ==
- Elizabeth Taylor as Louella Parsons
- Jane Alexander as Hedda Hopper
- Richard Dysart as Louis B. Mayer
- Joyce Van Patten as Dema Harshbarger
- Jon Cypher as Dr. Harry 'Docky' Martin
- Leslie Ackerman as Harriet Parsons
- Bonnie Bartlett as Ida Koverman
- Thomas Byrd as William Hopper
- Joel Colodner as Andy Kenderson
- Rick Lenz as Iceman
- Mary McCusker as Dot
- John Pleshette as Tommy Gallep
- Eric Purcell as Orson Welles
- Tim Robbins as Joseph Cotten
- Mark L. Taylor as Howard Strickling
- Nancy Travis as Ann
- B.J. Ward as June
- Vernon Weddle as Sam Goldwyn
- Allen Williams as Joel
- Theodore Wilson as Collins
- Jason Wingreen as Jack L. Warner
- Helen Baron as Ellen
- Thomas Bellin as Hotel Clerk
- Denise Crosby as Carole Lombard
- Robert Darnell as Heiner
- Christine Dickinson as Betty
- Douglas Emerson as Young Bill Harper
- Edith Fields as Mrs. Washburn
- Lyla Graham as Mrs. Clayton
- Anne Haney as Dema's Secretary
- Mindi Iden as Starlet
- Leigh Kavanaugh as 2nd Journalist
- Amelia Laurenson as Elizabeth Arden
- Galen Thompson as Hal
- Jan Tříska as Mike Romanoff
- Keith Walker as Albert
- Gary Wayne as Clark Gable
- Noni White as 1st Journalist
- Craig Richard Nelson as Radio Producer

== Crew ==
- Director as Gus Trikonis
- Producer as Jay Benson
- Music as Charles Bernstein
- Cinematographer as Philip H. Lathrop
- Film Editing as Allan Jacobs
- Production Designer as[John D. Jefferies Sr.
- Costume designer as Nolan Miller

== Home media ==
Malice in Wonderland was released on Region 1 DVD on June 28, 2004 with a running time of 94 minutes.
