= Dema Harshbarger =

American concert promoter and talent manager (1884–1964)

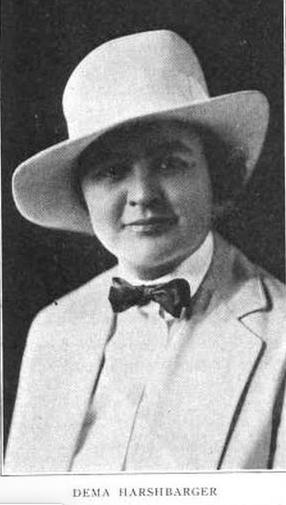
Dema Harshbarger, from a 1921 publication

Dema Harshbarger (September 8, 1884 — February 20, 1964) was an American businesswoman, concert promoter, and talent manager.

== Early life ==
Dema E. Harshbarger was born in Abingdon, Illinois, one of the seven children of Richard Henry Harshbarger and Sarah Belle Lewis Harshbarger. She survived polio and rheumatic fever in her youth. She attended Knox College. Soon after college, she went traveling with her music teacher Mrs. Parry; the two were among the rescued passengers in the wreck of the RMS Slavonia off the coast of Portugal.

== Career ==
Harshbarger started her career at the Century Lyceum Bureau in Chicago, booking lecturers and entertainers in small towns in Illinois and Indiana.

From 1919 to 1921 she and Jessie B. Hall ran the Fine Arts Bureau in Chicago. In 1921 she left Hall to become co-owner of Harrison and Harshbarger, a Chicago concert booking agency. Their first exclusive client was tenor Charles Marshall, and they helped to develop the "Organized-Audience Plan", a subscription model for entertainment bookings in smaller cities. In the 1920s, Harshbarger was co-founder (with Ward French) and president of the National Civic Music Association. "Through her service," explained a California newspaper in 1932, "more than one and a half million people in the forty-eight states are served with musical attractions."

Harshbarger sold her agency to NBC, moved to California, and was made head of the network's Artists' Bureau in 1936. She became manager and press agent of Hedda Hopper, and was frequently mentioned in Hopper's gossip column.

== Personal life ==
Dema Harshbarger was a lesbian. She was known for wearing tailored suits, bowties, and hats. She lived in La Habra Heights, California, where she raised avocados. She died in 1964, aged 79, in Los Angeles, California.

== In popular culture ==
Dema Harshbarger was played by Joyce Van Patten in the 1985 television film about Hedda Hopper and Louella Parsons, Malice in Wonderland.
