= The King and I (1999 film) =

1999 animated film directed by Richard Rich

- Theatrical release poster
- Directed by: Richard Rich
- Screenplay by: Peter Bakalian; Jacqueline Feather; David Seidler
- Adaptation by: Arthur Rankin, Jr.
- Based on: The King and I 1951 musical by Richard Rodgers and Oscar Hammerstein II; Anna and the King of Siam 1944 novel by Margaret Landon
- Produced by: Peter Bakalian; Arthur Rankin, Jr.; James G. Robinson
- Starring: Miranda Richardson; Martin Vidnovic; Ian Richardson; Darrell Hammond; Allen D. Hong; Armi Arabe; Adam Wylie
- Edited by: Joe Campana; Paul Murphy
- Music by: William Kidd
- Production companies: Morgan Creek Productions; Rankin/Bass Productions
- Distributed by: Warner Bros.
- Release date: March 19, 1999
- Running time: 89 minutes
- Country: United States
- Language: English
- Budget: $25 million
- Box office: $12 million

The King and I is a 1999 American animated musical film directed by Richard Rich. It is the only animated feature film produced by Morgan Creek Productions. Loosely based on Rodgers and Hammerstein's 1951 stage musical of the same name, it portrays a fictionalized account of English school teacher Anna Leonowens' historical encounter with king Mongkut of Siam and the royal court. The voice cast stars Miranda Richardson and Martin Vidnovic as Leonowens and Mongkut, respectively, with Ian Richardson, Darrell Hammond, Allen D. Hong, Armi Arabe, and Adam Wylie. The score, songs, and some of the character names come from the stage musical. Screenwriters Peter Bakalian, Jacqueline Feather, and David Seidler took creative liberties with the history and with the source material from the musical in an attempt to make the film palatable to all audiences.

The King and I was released by Warner Bros. on March 19, 1999, eight months prior to Anna and the King, a live-action adaptation of the same story. The film was panned by critics and earned $12 million at the box office against a $25 million budget; its gross was seen as disappointing compared to that of other animated films released at the time. The film received five nominations, including the London Critics Circle Film Award for British Actress of the Year for Richardson and the Golden Reel Award for Best Sound Editing in an Animated Feature.

== Plot ==
In 1862, Anna Leonowens and her son Louis sail from London to Bangkok, where Anna is to serve as teacher for the children of King Mongkut. Kralahome, the evil prime minister plotting to usurp the throne, attempts to prevent her arrival by using his powers of illusion to make it appear the ship is being attacked by a giant sea serpent; however, Anna, Louis and the crew manage to fend off the apparition by whistling a happy tune.

Arriving in Siam, despite being promised her own house outside the palace, Anna finds she has been denied it. Hoping to use Anna to achieve his goal, Kralahome informs her the King regularly goes back on his promises while exaggerating every one of the King's flaws. Since she will not receive the house, Anna decides to leave, but she changes her mind after meeting the royal children and seeing another side of the King after visiting his workshop, where he makes miniature trains and hot air balloons.

In the Grand Palace, Anna witnesses Mongkuk receive a young woman named Tuptim from Burma as a gift. While serving in the palace gardens, Tuptim meets Prince Chulalongkorn and the two begin to develop feelings for each other, but Chulalongkorn keeps his true identity hidden. Anna sees Chulalongkorn and Tuptim meeting in the garden and supports their relationship. Despite her reservations about the king, Anna begins teaching the royal children; learning they have never been outside the palace walls, she takes all of them around the city to see how other people live. Informed of this by his henchman, Master Little, Kralahome informs Mongkut of the outing; Mongkut subsequently confronts Anna, who angrily refutes his authority.

With Kralahome still plotting to overthrow the King, he writes a letter to officials from the British Empire, warning that Anna is in danger. Chulalongkorn discusses traditions with his father, informing him that he does not want to have multiple wives like him. Tuptim finally learns that Chulalongkorn is the crown prince and that their love is forbidden; however, he tells her that he does not care about tradition and wants to be with her. Master Little learns of their relationship and tells Kralahome, who plans to use it to anger Mongkut.

The King is troubled after learning that the British are coming because he is allegedly a barbarian. Anna advises Mongkut to throw a banquet for the British when they arrive to show that he is civilized. At the dinner, Kralahome reveals Chulalongkorn and Tuptim's relationship by showing Tuptim is wearing Chulalongkorn's royal ivory pendant. Dishonored, the King threatens to whip Tuptim to death but instead orders her to be sent back to Burma. Knowing that this will mean death for her, Chulalongkorn turns against his father and flees with Tuptim into the jungle.

As Chulalongkorn and Tuptim escape, Kralahome uses his powers to put the two in constant danger, leading to them to being caught in a river's current at the border of the Kingdom. The King uses his hot air balloon to rescue them, but in an enraged Kralahome destroys the balloon with a firework, and everyone but Mongkut safely jumps into a lake. Kralahome celebrates his apparent victory in the murder of the king but instead exposes his true nature in front of the British and the royal guards. Mongkut survives the crash and tells his son to be ready to lead Siam if he dies, allowing him and Tuptim to marry. With his scheme exposed, Kralahome and Master Little are forced the clean the elephant stables. The King heals from his injury and presents Anna with her house outside the palace walls.

== Voice cast ==
- Miranda Richardson as Anna Leonowens
  - Christiane Noll (singing voice)
- Martin Vidnovic as King Mongkut of Siam
- Allen D. Hong as Prince Chulalongkorn
  - David Burnham (singing voice)
- Armi Arabe as Tuptim
  - Tracy Venner Warren (singing voice)
- Ian Richardson as Kralahome
- Darrell Hammond as Master Little
- Adam Wylie as Louis Leonowens
- Sean Smith as Sir Edward Ramsay
- Frank Welker as Rama, Tusker and Moonshee
- J.A. Fujili as First Wife
- Ken Baker as Captain Orton
- Ed Trolla as Sir Edward's Captain
- Anthony Mozdy as Burmese Emissary
- Alexandra Lai as Princess Ying
- Katherine Lai as Princess Naomi
- Mark Hunt as Steward
- B.K. Tochi as Soldier

== Production ==
=== Development ===
After the success of Walt Disney Feature Animation's The Little Mermaid (1989), Warner Bros. Pictures began distributing several animated films, such as The Nutcracker Prince (1990) and Rover Dangerfield (1991), while also distributing Disney films theatrically in overseas markets until 1992. However, it was the success of The Lion King (1994) that convinced other Hollywood studios to consider producing in-house animated feature films.

In 1991, Morgan Creek Entertainment began a distribution deal with Warner Bros. to release its films within the United States. In 1994, the company established Warner Bros. Feature Animation, hiring Max Howard a year later to preside over the new division. In 1994, Arthur Rankin Jr., the head of Rankin/Bass Productions, had toured Thailand, where he considered adapting The King and I into an animated feature film. Together with his partner Jules Bass, they were able to convince the Rodgers and Hammerstein Organization, which held the copyright to the musical, that an animated feature film "would be a superb way" to expand the property. Both parties struck a deal, with the organization getting a potential share of the box office gross. Rankin/Bass then recruited Morgan Creek as the production company.

=== Writing ===
Prior to the release of Quest for Camelot (1998), screenwriters David Seidler and Jacqueline Feather were contracted to adapt the film for Morgan Creek, to be released under the Warner Bros. Family Entertainment label. In 1998, it was revealed the plot had been "slightly altered" from the original musical "in the interest of family viewing." However, no changes could be made without the approval of the Rodgers and Hammerstein Organization. According to then-president Ted Chapin, it was known within the organization that the changes would be a risk, but they hoped the film would "introduce a generation of younger people to the show earlier than they might have been under normal circumstances".

=== Design and animation ===
Each of the characters in the film was designed by a team of animators consisting of Bronwen Barry, Elena Kravets, and Michael Coppieters. The final design of each character had to receive final approval from James G. Robinson, the head of Morgan Creek Entertainment. Over one thousand animators were hired in over 24 countries across four different continents to hand draw each second of the film. Patrick Gleeson and Colm Duggan served as the supervising animators for domestic production, while additional animation was outsourced to Giant Productions, Canuck Creations, Partners in Production, Manigates Animacion, and Stardust Pictures. Clean-up animation was contracted to Hanho Heung-Up in Seoul, South Korea.

== Music ==
A soundtrack album was released on March 16, 1999, by Sony Classical Records. It was released in both CD and cassette formats. Many songs from the original musical are performed in this film. All the songs on the album were originally composed by Richard Rodgers and Oscar Hammerstein II. The Philharmonia Orchestra covers the instrumental score.

William Ruhlmann of Allmusic.com gave the album a rating of 3 stars out of 5, describing it as a "surprisingly adequate" soundtrack to a "badly received" film. He adds, however, that the "overly effusive vocal performances" and "overly busy arrangements" make it "by far the worst version of this music ever recorded", and cites the use of "nine different orchestrators" as a possible factor. He concludes by conceding that there is good singing on the album. John Kenrick, in his article Comparative CD Reviews Part III, describes the 1999 recording as a "total disgrace" that sees "superb Broadway singers...labor against mindless cuts and gooey orchestrations". In a relatively negative review of the animated adaption, The Rodgers and Hammerstein Encyclopedia does say that "some of the songs survive nicely, and the singing vocals throughout are very proficient".

=== Songs ===
All lyrics are written by Oscar Hammerstein II; all music is composed by Richard Rodgers.

No.	Title	Performer(s)	Length
1.	"I Whistle a Happy Tune"	Christiane Noll, Adam Wylie & Chorus
2.	"Hello, Young Lovers"	Christiane Noll
3.	"Getting to Know You"	Christiane Noll & Chorus
4.	"Shall I Tell You What I Think of You?"	Christiane Noll
5.	"A Puzzlement"	Martin Vidnovic
6.	"I Have Dreamed"	David Burnham & Tracy Venner Warren
7.	"Prayer to Buddha"	Martin Vidnovic & Chorus
8.	"Shall We Dance Fantasy"	Christiane Noll
9.	"Shall We Dance? (Finale)"	Christiane Noll & Martin Vidnovic
10.	"I Have Dreamed / We Kiss in a Shadow / Something Wonderful (from The Broadway Album, End Credits Version)"	Barbra Streisand

== Release ==
As with most film adaptations of Anna and the King of Siam, the film was banned in Thailand.

=== Home media ===
The King and I was released on VHS and DVD on July 6, 1999, by Warner Home Video. During its home video release, the film remained in the top 20 of Billboard's Top Kid Video Chart for over 15 weeks. In December 1999, the film became the sixteenth best-selling children's title of the year. The film was later made available on Amazon Prime Video when the streaming service premiered on August 1, 2011. The film was listed on iTunes for digital sale in 2010.

Mill Creek Entertainment released the Blu-ray/digital combo pack of the film on October 6, 2020.

== Reception ==
=== Box office ===
The King and I earned $4 million during its opening weekend, occupying the sixth spot at the box office. The film ultimately grossed under $12 million at the box office. Its release also coincided with Doug's 1st Movie, which was released the following week. The film was a box office failure.

=== Critical reception ===
On Rotten Tomatoes, The King and I has an approval rating of 13% based on 24 reviews, with an average rating of 4/10. The site's critical consensus reads, "Charmless and shoddily animated, The King and I pales in comparison to its classic namesake in every way." Historian Thomas Hischak wrote that it was "surprising to think that the Rodgers & Hammerstein Organization allowed it to be made ... children have enjoyed The King and I for five decades without relying on dancing dragons". Hischak, in his work The Oxford Companion to the American Musical: Theatre, Film, and Television, says the film is "easily the worst treatment of any Rodgers and Hammerstein property". The Rodgers and Hammerstein Encyclopedia says "whether or not one agrees about the 1956 film of The King and I being the best R&H movie, most would concede that [the] animated adaption is the worst". Roger Ebert rated the film two out of four stars, saying that while it had potential he felt the story would not be interesting to children and found the humor lacking.

== See also ==
- Anna and the King of Siam – The original book which inspired the original musical.
- The King and I – The original Broadway musical which inspired the 1999 film.
