= Organized-Audience Plan =

The Organized-Audience Plan was formulated in the early 20th century to bring quality performing artists to small and medium-sized cities. It successfully expanded performance venues from the country's prominent population centers to those much smaller communities that were able to form Concert Associations of 600–4000 subscribers. Following the Organized-Audience Plan, these concert associations typically launched short membership drives with the resulting subscriptions used to fund a series of visiting artists who, in turn, contracted with a few national management organizations. The income would usually sustain an annual series of 4–9 concerts balanced between prominent and emerging artists.

The Organized-Audience Plan was sometimes dubbed as "a Carnegie Hall in every town." Some prominent artists started their careers by performing on the concert association circuit.

== History ==
=== Early history ===
The concept of the Organized-Audience Plan is often credited to Arthur Judson, at that time the manager of the Philadelphia Orchestra. In 1920 Judson experimented with the concert subscription model when he was asked by philanthropists Adolph Lewisohn and Minnie Guggenheimer to manage a concert series at City College Stadium which was geared toward creating affordable high quality music performances. In 1922, after being appointed as the manager of the New York Philharmonic, Judson began to lead efforts to enhance cooperation and shared resources between cultural organizations. In that year he also negotiated cooperation between the national organizations, one representing soloists and the second, local booking managers. Borrowing from the model of the Redpath Lyceum Bureau, Judson envisioned an organized national network of traveling artists who were efficiently booked to local venues. In 1927 Judson formed Community Concerts, Inc. which linked networks of performers and "organized audiences." This idea was also borrowed from the community fund-raising models developed by Chicago's Harry P. Harrison, Dema Harshbarger, and Ward French.

=== Community Concerts, Inc. ===
Community Concerts, Inc. became the preeminent organizer of concerts in the United States. In its 1951–1952 season it supported approximately 1000 local concert associations. It provided assistance to the local associations in their membership drive efforts and also helped them plan concerts. It provided a menu of artists and repertory from which the local concert associations could select.

The success of Community Concerts rested on finely attuning its programs to evolving audience tastes. In this 1951–1952 season the choices of composers were exclusively limited to those in the Romantic period with no representation of the Renaissance or Modern eras. Perhaps due to the impact of emerging technologies such as FM radio and high quality disc recording, by the 1957–58 season non-Romantic composers were represented in the sponsored programs.

The competing promoters of the Organized-Audience Plan were Civic Concert Service Inc. and United Audience Service. In 1966 community organizations began to incorporate the Organized-Audience Plan independent of Community Concerts and its key competitors through publications such as Musical America. By 1977 Community Concerts membership had declined to approximately 700 local organizations. It closed during the 2002–2003 season.

=== International model ===
The Organized-Audience Plan model has spread abroad. In the 1950s there were 75 concert associations in Canada although the total now is reduced to approximately 15. Arguably the largest concert association in the world is Min-on Concert Association in Japan.

== Criticisms ==
Although the Organized-Audience Plan achieved much success, it also met with controversy. Performers criticized their levels of remuneration, often 30% discounted from typical fees due to circuit travel costs and overhead, and complained about being blocked out by favored performers. The organizers were criticized for favoring certain types of performances over others. In 1939 Time magazine maligned the Organized-Audience Plan as "chain store music" and a "stooge set-up" in which small communities did not receive value for their fund-raising efforts.

== Representative concert associations ==
The Organized-Audience Plan is initiated and managed at the community level. Frequently local concert associations are in small and medium cities and information about them can be found on their own self-promoting websites. For example, the Sheboygan Concert Association was founded in 1929 and celebrated its 89th season in the fall of 2017. The annual membership fee is $55 and entitles a subscriber to four concerts each year. JC Concerts in Jackson County Oregon is celebrating its 75th anniversary. In southern Delaware, the Seaford Concert Association was organized in 1949.

== See also ==
- Anchorage Concert Association
- Bullhead City, Arizona (section Colorado River Concert Association)
- Columbia Artists Management
- Tri-State Concert Series
