= The Getaway People =

Norwegian alt-rock band (1994–2002)

- Origin: Stavanger, Norway
- Genres: Alternative rock
- Years active: 1994–2002

The Getaway People was a Norwegian alternative rock band best known for their song "Six Pacs" which was used as the theme song for the television series Young Americans.

== History ==
The Getaway People formed in Stavanger, Norway in 1994 with the intention to "write songs about getting away from everyday pressures through whatever means necessary to give breathing space so we can function better."

The band's first album The Getaway People was released in 1998. Its first single "She Gave Me Love" received airplay from some alternative radio stations. The band toured with Dave Matthews Band, Barenaked Ladies and Semisonic during this time.

After signing with Columbia Records, the band released their second and final album Turnpike Diaries. Its only official single was "Six Pacs", however several tracks from the album made their way onto various soundtrack albums for films and television shows.

- At the request of the show's producers, a modified version of the song "Six Pacs," with lyrical references to cigarettes replaced, was used as the theme song for Young Americans.
- Three tracks ("Six Pacs", "Good Life", and "There She Goes") were featured in second-season episodes of Malcolm in the Middle.
- "There She Goes" was featured in the three films: The Sweetest Thing (starring Cameron Diaz), Bring It On (starring Kirsten Dunst) and A Lot Like Love (starring Ashton Kutcher and Amanda Peet).
- "She Gave Me Love" was featured on the soundtrack for the film Crazy/Beautiful (starring Kirsten Dunst).
- "Deceived By An Angel" was featured in series 1 episode 13 of As If.

The band split up in 2002. Aside from an appearance at Rogafest, a large concert that took place in the band's hometown in 2008, there has been no other known activity.

The band's song "Good Life" was recorded by pop singer Jesse McCartney and released as a hidden track on his debut album Beautiful Soul in 2004. A music video was released for the track in 2005.

== Members ==
- Per Kristian Ottestad (a.k.a. "Boots"): lead vocals
- Pål Morterud (a.k.a. "Race"): bass guitar
- Arne Hovda (a.k.a. "Honda"): keyboard/vocals
- Espen Noreger (a.k.a. "Leroy"): percussion
- Harald Halle: guitar (1994 - 1996)
- Stein Bjelland (a.k.a. "Stone"): guitar (1996 - early 2000s)

== Discography ==
=== Studio albums ===
Title	Album details	Peak chart positions
Title	Album details	NOR
The Getaway People	Released: 7 April 1998; Label: Columbia (#COL489705); Formats: CS, CD	33
Turnpike Diaries	Released: 18 July 2000; Label: Columbia (#COL494931); Formats: CS, CD	19
"—" denotes items that did not chart or were not released in that territory.

=== Singles ===
- "She Gave Me Love" (1998)
- "Chocolate" (1998)
- "Six Packs" (2000)
