= Joan of Ozark =

1942 film by Joseph Santley

- Directed by: Joseph Santley
- Written by: Robert Harari; Eve Greene; Jack Townley; Monte Brice; Bradford Ropes (additional dialogue)
- Produced by: Harriet Parsons
- Starring: Judy Canova; Joe E. Brown; Eddie Foy Jr.; Jerome Cowan
- Cinematography: Ernest Miller
- Edited by: Charles Craft
- Music by: Mort Glickman; Arnold Schwarzwald
- Production company: Republic Pictures
- Distributed by: Republic Pictures
- Release date: July 15, 1942
- Running time: 82 minutes
- Country: United States
- Language: English

Joan of Ozark is a 1942 American comedy film directed by Joseph Santley and starring Judy Canova, Joe E. Brown and Eddie Foy Jr. It was one of thirteen films Canova made with Republic Studios. It is also known by the alternative title The Queen of Spies.

== Plot ==
A hillbilly manages to foil a ring of Nazi spies operating in the United States.

== Cast ==
- Judy Canova as Judy Hull
- Joe E. Brown as Cliff Little
- Eddie Foy Jr. as Eddie McCabe
- Jerome Cowan as Phillip Munson
- Alexander Granach as Guido
- Anne Jeffreys as Marie Lamont
- Otto Reichow as Otto
- Donald Curtis as Leonard Jones
- Wolfgang Zilzer as Kurt
- Hans Heinrich von Twardowski as Hans
- Harry Hayden as Mayor Fadden
- Wilhelm von Brincken as German Radio Operator

== Bibliography ==
- Hurst, Richard M. Republic Studios: Beyond Poverty Row and the Majors. Scarecrow Press, 2007.
