= Come On Get Happy: The Partridge Family Story =

1999 biographical television film

- Genre: Biographical drama
- Written by: Jon S. Denny; Jacqueline Feather; David Seidler
- Directed by: David Burton Morris
- Starring: Shawn Pyfrom; Rodney Scott; Eve Gordon; William Russ; Roxanne Hart
- Narrated by: Danny Bonaduce
- Music by: Guy Moon; Steve Tyrell
- Country of origin: United States
- Original language: English

Production
- Executive producers: Jon S. Denny; Randy Robinson
- Producer: Timothy Marx
- Cinematography: Shelly Johnson
- Editor: Michael S. Murphy
- Running time: 100 minutes
- Production companies: Columbia TriStar Television; Randwell Productions

Original release
- Network: ABC
- Release: November 13, 1999

Come On, Get Happy: The Partridge Family Story is a 1999 American biographical drama television film about the 1970–1974 television series The Partridge Family, focusing on star David Cassidy and co-star Danny Bonaduce through the four years the show was on. Directed by David Burton Morris and written by Jacqueline Feather, the 90-minute film premiered on November 13, 1999 at 8:00pm on ABC.

== Synopsis ==
The story is told from the viewpoint of Danny Bonaduce, narrated by Bonaduce himself and played on-screen by a pre-Desperate Housewives Shawn Pyfrom. Upon landing the coveted role of Danny Partridge, young Bonaduce must contend with the jealousy of his abusive father Joseph (William Russ); all the while, Danny is a sidelines observer of the effect that overnight stardom has on his co-worker David Cassidy (Rodney Scott), who despises all the idolatry and yearns for a normal life.

The film recounts the surrogate son-surrogate father relationship between Danny and actor Dave Madden (Michael Chieffo), who was genuinely fond of his younger costars despite the kid-hating irascibility of his "Reuben Kincaid" character.

== Cast ==
- Shawn Pyfrom as Danny Bonaduce
- Rodney Scott as David Cassidy
- Eve Gordon as Shirley Jones
- Kathy Wagner as Susan Dey
- Michael Chieffo as Dave Madden
- William Russ as Joseph Bonaduce
- Roxanne Hart as Betty Bonaduce
- Richard Fancy as Harold
- Willie Garson as Sam
- Mark Harelik as Alex
- Danny Bonaduce as Narrator
- Tara Blanchard as Suzanne Crough
- J.B. Gaynor as Jeremy Gelbwaks
- Scotty Leavenworth as Brian Forster
- Shane Newell as Kid on Bike

== See also ==
- The Partridge Family
