= Turnpike Diaries =

Studio album by The Getaway People
- Released: July 18, 2000
- Recorded: 1999
- Studio: RPM Studios (New York, NY)
- Genre: Alternative rock; post-grunge
- Length: 38:54
- Label: Columbia
- Producer: Dante Ross; John Gamble; Nick Sansano; The Getaway People

The Getaway People chronology
The Getaway People (1998)	Turnpike Diaries (2000)

Professional ratings
Review scores
Source	Rating
AllMusic	3/5 stars
Entertainment Weekly	B

Turnpike Diaries is the second and final studio album by the Norwegian band The Getaway People. It was originally scheduled to be released in June 2000, but ultimately was not released until July 18 of the same year. Recording sessions took place at RPM Studios in New York City. Production was handled by Nick Sansano, Dante Ross, John Gamble and the band themselves. The album peaked at number 19 on the Norwegian VG-lista albums chart.

The album's first song, "Six Pacs", was used as the theme song for the TV series Young Americans. The track "Good Life" was featured in the US sitcom, Malcolm in the Middle. The album's second track “There She Goes” was featured in the critically acclaimed 2000 cheerleading comedy film Bring It On.

== Track listing ==
No.	Title	Writer(s)	Producer(s)	Length
1.	"Six Pacs"	Per Kristian Ottestad; Espen Noreger	Nick Sansano; The Getaway People	3:55
2.	"There She Goes"	Ottestad	Nick Sansano; The Getaway People	4:16
3.	"Come Love Me"	Ottestad; Rahzel M. Brown	Dante Ross; John Gamble	4:24
4.	"Deceived by an Angel"	Ottestad; Noreger	The Getaway People	4:19
5.	"Sleepwalkin'"	Ottestad; Noreger	The Getaway People	3:35
6.	"All About It"	Ottestad	The Getaway People	3:33
7.	"Soi Cowboy"	Ottestad; Noreger	The Getaway People	3:40
8.	"Change"	Ottestad; Arne Hovda	The Getaway People	3:47
9.	"Good Life"	Ottestad	Nick Sansano; The Getaway People	3:30
10.	"Open Your Mind"	Ottestad; Noreger	The Getaway People	3:55
Total length:				38:54

Hidden track
No.	Title	Producer(s)	Length
11.	"S.G.M.L."	Dr. Luke

== Personnel ==
- The Getaway People – arrangement, producers (tracks: 1, 2, 4–10), mixing (tracks: 4, 7)
- Per Kristian "Boots" Ottestad – lead vocals, rhythm guitar, acoustic guitar, additional piano (track 1), additional keyboards (track 4)
- Stein "Stone" Bjelland – backing vocals, lead guitar, sound effects (track 4)
- Pål "Race" Morterud – backing vocals, bass, upright bass
- Arne "Honda" Hovda – backing vocals, keyboards, programming, additional guitar (track 9)
- Espen "Leroy" Noreger – drums, sampler, programming, additional keyboards (track 4), scratches (track 8), photography
- Wendy Perez – additional vocals (track 2)
- Rahzel M. Brown – rap vocals & sound effects (track 3)
- Darryl Jenifer – accompanying vocals (track 5)
- DJ FS – scratches (tracks: 1, 2, 9)
- Nick Sansano – accordion (track 2), producer & recording (tracks: 1, 2, 9), mixing (tracks: 1, 2, 5, 6, 8–10)
- Jonathan Keidan – bongos (track 2), congas (track 6), additional percussion (track 9), creative director, management
- Mark Pender – trumpet (track 2)
- Ozzie Melendez – trombone & arrangement (track 3)
- John Scarpulla – tenor saxophone (track 3)
- Tony Kadleck – trumpet (track 3)
- Helge Wetaas – saxophone (tracks: 6, 7)
- Bjørn Haukland – trumpet (tracks: 6, 7)
- Torbjørn Solum – sonarsounds (track 7), engineering (tracks: 4–8, 10)
- Boyd Tinsley – violin (track 10)
- Dante Ross – producer & mixing (track 3)
- John Gamble – producer & mixing (track 3)
- Cyrille Taillandier – Pro Tools editing (tracks: 1, 2, 9)
- Danny Madorsky – Pro Tools editing (tracks: 1, 2, 9)
- Steve Rittler – engineering assistant (tracks: 1, 2, 9)
- Tovi Rodriguez – engineering assistant (tracks: 1, 2, 9)
- Jamie Staub – engineering & mixing (track 3)
- Tuba Solum – mixing (tracks: 4, 7)
- Tom Coyne – mastering
- Harald Husum – cover artwork, design
- Ole Martin Lund Bø – cover artwork, design
- Alice V. Butts – design
- Katrin Thomas – photography
- Kevin Patrick – A&R
- Marty Diamond – booking
- Michael Selverne – legal
- Peter Malkin – co-management

== Charts ==
Chart (2000)	Peak position
Norwegian Albums (VG-lista)	19
