= Six Pacs =

Song by The Getaway People

"Six Pacs" is a song from the album Turnpike Diaries by Norwegian musical group The Getaway People. A modified version of the song was used as the theme song for the TV series Young Americans. The lyrics were changed at the request of the producers to remove the original reference to cigarettes.
