= Onassis: The Richest Man in the World =

- Genre: Biography; Drama; Romance
- Based on: Ari: The Life and Times of Aristotle Socrates Onassis by Peter Evans
- Screenplay by: Jacqueline Feather; David Seidler
- Directed by: Waris Hussein
- Starring: Raul Julia
- Theme music composer: Billy Goldenberg
- Countries of origin: United States; Spain
- Original language: English

Production
- Executive producers: Frank Konigsberg; Larry Sanitsky
- Producers: Alfred R. Kelman; Laurence Myers
- Production location: Spain
- Cinematography: Alan Doberman
- Editor: David Saxon
- Running time: 120 minutes
- Production companies: Konigsberg/Sanitsky Company; Televisión Española

Original release
- Network: ABC
- Release: May 1 – May 2, 1988

Onassis: The Richest Man in the World is a 1988 American-Spanish made-for-television biographical film directed by Waris Hussein and starring Raul Julia as Aristotle Onassis.

== Premise ==
Biography of the life of Aristotle Onassis (Raul Julia), a Greek who rose to become one of the world's wealthiest men, detailing his rise to power and unhappy marriages.

== Cast ==
- Raul Julia as Aristotle Onassis
  - Elias Koteas as Young Aristotle Onassis
- Jane Seymour as Maria Callas
- Anthony Quinn as Socrates Onassis
- Francesca Annis as Jacqueline Kennedy Onassis
- Beatie Edney as Tina
- Anthony Zerbe as Livanos
- John Kapelos as Costas Gratsos

== Accolade ==
For her portrayal as Maria Callas, Jane Seymour won the Primetime Emmy Award for Outstanding Supporting Actress in a Limited Series or Movie.
