= Young Americans (TV series) =

2000 American television series

- Genre: Drama
- Created by: Steven Antin
- Starring: Rodney Scott; Mark Famiglietti; Katherine Moennig; Ian Somerhalder; Kate Bosworth; Ed Quinn
- Narrated by: Rodney Scott as Will Krudski
- Opening theme: "Six Pacs" (modified) by The Getaway People
- Country of origin: United States
- Original language: English
- No. of seasons: 1
- No. of episodes: 8 (plus 1 unaired pilot)

Production
- Executive producers: Scott Sanders; Joe Voci
- Running time: 43 minutes
- Production companies: Mandalay Television; Lions Gate Television; Columbia TriStar Television

Original release
- Network: The WB
- Release: July 12 – August 30, 2000

Related
- Dawson's Creek

Young Americans is an American drama television series created by Steven Antin. The show debuted on July 12, 2000, on The WB network as a summer replacement for, and spin-off from, another Columbia TriStar Television production, Dawson's Creek. The series was originally ordered for the 1999–2000 United States television season with a planned fall debut, but was delayed due to unresolved matters between Columbia TriStar and The WB.

The main character, Will Krudski, was introduced late in season three of Dawson's Creek as a childhood friend of the group who has kept in contact with Pacey Witter. The show explores themes of forbidden love, morality, social classes and gender roles.

== Plot summary ==
Young Americans is set in the town of New Rawley at a prestigious boarding school, Rawley Academy. Will Krudski, a working class New Englander, earns a scholarship to his hometown's posh boarding school, starting with the summer session, as a means of escaping his abusive father. In a moment of carelessness he confesses to his roommate Scout Calhoun that he cheated on the entrance exam. Their professor, Finn, overhears Will and Scout discussing what to do. Before making a final decision about expelling him, Finn has Will write an essay on who he is.

You asked me to write an essay telling you what I have to say and what I realized is that I've been ordered to listen from the moment I was born but now I know it is my time to speak. What I figured out is that I have always seen myself as others have seen me, this poor kid, this smart kid, this dreamer who doesn't have a chance. I have known the comfort of my mother's arms and the violence of my father's disappointment but everyone encounters obstacles. The trick is to discover the opportunities within them. I've learned that every day we create who we are by what we do and what we think and how we behave. So now that it is my time to speak I just hope that I have something to say and I am going to set my expectations high and one day will exceed them.

— Will Krudski

Throughout the series, Will faces moral dilemmas as he struggles to find his place at school while not alienating his friends in town. There is also the forbidden love between Scout and Bella Banks, Will’s childhood friend who may or may not share the same father with Scout. Jacqueline Pratt, in an attempt to see if her mother notices her, enrolls at Rawley Academy posing as a male student with the name Jake. Things get complicated when she develops feelings for Hamilton Fleming, the dean's son. Hamilton begins to wonder if he is gay as he realizes he has feelings for Jake. The story lines do not converge until the final two episodes of the show as Bella seeks the truth about her biological father.

== Cast and characters ==
=== Main characters ===
- Rodney Scott as William "Will" Krudski, a poor but brilliant young man who cheated on the entrance exam to ensure his admission and has a complicated relationship to his father
- Mark Famiglietti as Scout Calhoun, Will's roommate at Rawley Academy. Scout meets, and dates, Will's old friend Bella until her stepfather explains his reasons why he disapproves.
- Katherine Moennig as Jacqueline "Jake" Pratt, a teenage girl who disguises herself as a boy to get the attention of her absent mother.
- Ian Somerhalder as Hamilton Fleming, a student at the school and the son of the dean. Hamilton finds himself confused by his attraction to Jake.
- Kate Bosworth as Bella Banks, Will's childhood friend – a pretty townie torn between Scout and fellow New Rawleyian, Sean
- Ed Quinn as Finn, coach of the rowing team and also a teacher

=== Notable guest appearances ===
- Matt Czuchry as Sean McGrail, Will's long-time best friend and baseball teammate as well as a childhood friend of Bella's. He eventually becomes Bella's boyfriend.
- Deborah Hazlett as Susan Krudski, Will's mother. Works at a New Rawley beauty salon named "Glamorama".
- Charlie Hunnam as Gregor Ryder, bad-boy and student at Rawley Academy
- Michelle Monaghan as Caroline Busse, Will's love interest
- Cyndi Johnson as Paige Bennett, old friend of Scout's family
- Kathleen Bridget Kelly as Kate Fleming, Hamilton's mother and the dean's wife
- Gabrielle Christian as Grace, Bella's irresponsible sister
- Beau Gravitte as Senator Calhoun, Scout's dad
- Glynnis O'Connor as Donna Banks, Bella & Grace's mom
- Naomi Kline as Lena, a student visiting Rawley Academy for girls showing a romantic interest in Jake

== Production ==
Steve Antin credits a stop at a New England gas station as the inspiration for the series. He was a little surprised to see four teenage girls working as pump jockeys. "One of them said, 'My dad owns the station.' I just thought this was the sweetest thing I ever saw."

The pilot was filmed in Atlanta in 1999 and with a somewhat different cast. The character of Finn was played by Jeremy Sisto in the pilot, but between the pilot and the reshoots for the series, Sisto was cast in the title role of CBS' miniseries Jesus. When the production relocated they also replaced secondary roles, and the only original cast members that remained were the five principal actors. The pilot's soundtrack contained recognizable tracks by Fatboy Slim, New Radicals, and The Flys, but after the reshoots, Antin replaced them with favorites like Nick Drake's "Pink Moon" and Israel Kamakawiwo'ole's "Over the Rainbow", which at the same time became fashionable in commercials for Volkswagen's Cabrio convertible and eToys.com. A subplot in the pilot involving an affair between Finn and the dean's wife was dropped and later inserted into the third episode of the series.

The series was filmed in Havre de Grace, Maryland where a new "town square", gas station and Friendly's restaurant were built for the production of the show at the intersection of Congress Avenue and North Washington Street. Wilmington and Charlotte, both in North Carolina, had been considered possible filming locations for the series.

=== Sponsorship ===
Young Americans promotional poster showing the association with Coca-Cola

Young Americans was originally supposed to be a mid-season show in 2000 but was put on hold until Coca-Cola offered to sponsor the show. The character of Will Krudski was then written into Dawson's Creek to associate Young Americans with one of The WB's established shows. When Dawson's Creek went on hiatus in the summer of 2000, Young Americans occupied its timeslot of Wednesdays at 9 P.M. Repeats were shown at 9 P.M. on Fridays.

The Coca-Cola Company paid $6 million to be the primary sponsor, the show being billed as "Coca-Cola Presents Young Americans". Young Americans was profiled by Steve Carell on the August 22, 2000 episode of The Daily Show in the Ad Nauseam segment due to the Coca-Cola tie ins. Carell constantly referred to "The Beginning" as an "hour-long commercial". Some of the scenes also took place in a Friendly's restaurant, which was built from an old pizzeria for the show.

Coca-Cola products are seen or mentioned in most episodes. The unaired pilot episode does not contain the product placement. Among the changes to the pilot is a scene that was reshot in order to show the characters drinking Coca-Cola.

=== Promotion ===
A scene from the pilot, which was heavily promoted prior to the show's premiere, where the characters and other students at Rawley run in slow motion to the school's lake while stripping off their clothes was parodied in another WB show, Grosse Pointe.

== Broadcast ==
=== International ===
In Norway the show aired on TV3, as a summer replacement for Dawson's Creek.

== Episodes ==
The main character, Will Krudski, was introduced late in season three of Dawson's Creek as a childhood friend of the group who has kept in contact with Pacey Witter. In a three-episode story arc, Will goes to Capeside to visit with old friends while on spring break. After briefly dating Andie McPhee, he leaves Capeside to attend Rawley Academy.

=== Pilot ===
Title	Directed by	Written by	Original release date
"Pilot"	Kevin Rodney Sullivan	Steven Antin	Unaired
The pilot was not aired on television. There are some differences between the pilot and the first aired episode "The Beginning" including Jeremy Sisto in the role of Finn, production in Atlanta with the secondary roles cast with actors local to Atlanta, and a Top 40 soundtrack instead of less well known music that is personally favored by the series creator.

=== Season 1 (2000) ===
No.	Title	Directed by	Written by	Original release date	Viewers (millions)
1	"The Beginning"	James Whitmore, Jr.	Steven Antin	July 12, 2000	2.87
Will settles in at Rawley Academy, where the teacher Finn learns a secret Will shared with Scout. When Scout's dating Bella turns serious, Mr. Banks explains why he won't allow it. The rowing team's cox Jake Pratt, who also has a secret, makes a profound impression on Hamilton. Hamilton is surprised by this and starts to question his own sexual orientation.
2	"Our Town" "Some Good Times"	James Whitmore, Jr.	Steven Antin	July 19, 2000	2.66
Will agonises over telling best friend Sean about his attending the summer session at Rawley Academy. Scout is introduced to Will's old friends at Sean's party. Bella gets upset when Scout tells her that he wants to tell his father about her. Sean misreads the situation and a brawl ensues. Hamilton lets Jake know that he's not into guys. Jake's bike is confiscated by the groundskeeper and Hamilton offers to help get it back. Guest starring: Matt Czuchry as Sean McGrail, Delaney Williams as Groundskeeper
3	"Kiss and Tell"	Perry Lang	Kerry Ehrin	July 26, 2000	2.49
Will and returned student Ryder accidentally see Finn kissing the dean's wife. Will finds himself in a position where he has to choose between protecting Finn or himself. Scout has a hard time stopping thinking about Bella, but then Paige, a long-time friend of Scout's family, turns up. Scout asks Paige out on a date to the newly restored drive-in theater. Lena, an L.A. resident visiting Rawley Academy, hears about the drive-in and invites Jake to join her and Hamilton. Guest starring: Charlie Hunnam as Gregor Ryder, Matt Czuchry as Sean McGrail, Kathleen Bridget Kelly as Kate Fleming, Naomi Kline as Lena
4	"Cinderbella"	James Whitmore, Jr.	Anne McGrail	August 2, 2000	2.80
Will asks Bella to join him for the Summer Cotillion to impress on Caroline. Hamilton and Jake agree to go alone together, an agreement which is broken when Lena asks Hamilton to go with her. Guest starring: Matt Czuchry as Sean McGrail, Michelle Monaghan as Caroline Busse
5	"Winning Isn't Everything"	Mel Damski	Andi Bushell & Jim Praytor	August 9, 2000	2.53
Scout's father Senator Calhoun makes an unexpected visit for parents' weekend and the regatta, as does Jake's mother. Will's conflict with his father deepens and Bella contemplates meeting the Senator. Guest starring: Beau Gravitte as Senator Calhoun, Deborah Hazlett as Susan Krudski, Tracy Howe as Brian Krudski, Gabrielle Christian as Grace Banks, Matt Mulhern as Charlie Banks
6	"Gone"	James Whitmore, Jr.	Laura Wolner & Greg Berlanti	August 16, 2000	2.46
Bella writes a confessional letter to senator Calhoun and hides it in her jacket, which her younger sister, Grace, subsequently borrows and loses. Ryder finds himself in possession of Will's laptop. Jake and Hamilton go on a date and are confused as to who should pick up the tab or ride the "bitch pad" of Jake's bike. Note: This episode is narrated by Bella. Guest starring: Charlie Hunnam as Gregor Ryder
7	"Free Will"	Robert M. Williams, Jr.	Ellen Byron & Lissa Kapstrom	August 21, 2000	2.29
Bella receives a birthday present from her mother but is unsure how to relate to it. Will's request to tutor has been approved. Will is surprised to learn who he will tutor and what has changed since they last met. Hamilton suggests moving in with Jake so that they can spend more time together. Guest starring: Charlie Hunnam as Gregor Ryder, Matt Czuchry as Sean McGrail, Kathleen Bridget Kelly as Kate Fleming
8	"Will Bella Scout Her Mom?"	James Whitmore, Jr.	Steven Antin & Joe Voci	August 30, 2000	2.63
Will learns that the funding for his scholarship has been withdrawn. Bella's father receives a phone call informing him that the gas station is up for auction, and Bella seeks out her mother to put the deed in her father's name. Jake's masquerade comes to an abrupt halt. At the end of the episode, Will gets new funding, allowing him to remain at the academy for the fall semester. While this episode is clearly meant to serve as the introduction for the fall season of the series, Young Americans was canceled before any additional episodes could be produced. Guest starring: Matt Czuchry as Sean McGrail, Glynnis O'Connor as Donna Banks

== Music ==
Six packs and Big Macs keep us rolling down the road
Cigarettes and coffee, wherever we go
Learn to appreciate those simple little things
And open up our arms to what the road may bring
[...]
People all around us, they shower us with love
You better keep it coming 'cause we just can't get enough
Where would we be without a little love?
You can't get by without a little love
Everybody needs a little bit of love, sometimes
(You bring the pack, and we bring the six pack)

— Lyrics from the unmodified version of Six Pacs

Throw all your backpacks, we'll be rolling down the road
Big dreams and wild schemes, wherever we go
People all around us, they shower us with love
You better keep it coming 'cause we just can't get enough
Where would we be without a little love?
You can't get by without a little love
Everybody needs a little bit of love, sometimes

— Lyrics from the modified/full opening theme version of Six Pacs

The soundtrack features several songs with Nick Drake from his album Pink Moon.

- Nick Drake – "Pink Moon" (ep 1.1 and 1.7)
- The Getaway People – "Six Pacs" (modified) (ep 1.1 and theme song)
- Nick Drake – "From the Morning" (ep 1.1)
- Blur – "Tender" (ep 1.1)
- Hans Zimmer – "You're so cool" (ep 1.1)
- Israel Kamakawiwo'ole – "Over the Rainbow" (ep 1.1 and 1.8)
- Crash Poets – "Goodbye" (ep 1.2)
- Nick Drake – "Which Will" (ep 1.3)
- Kate Bosworth as Bella Banks – "The Way You Look Tonight" (ep. 1.4)
- Julius La Rosa – "The Way You Look Tonight" (ep. 1.4)
- David Gray – "This Years Love" (ep. 1.5)
- Salt-N-Pepa – "Let's Talk About Sex" (ep. 1.5)
- David Gray – "Sail Away" (ep 1.5)
- David Gray – "Please Forgive Me" (Album Version) (ep 1.5)
- Nick Drake – "Place to Be" (ep 1.7)
- Nick Drake – "Things Behind the Sun" (ep 1.7)
- Brooke Lundy – "Fernando" (ep 1.8)

=== Theme song ===
The theme song "Six Pacs" by The Getaway People from the album Turnpike Diaries was changed at the request of the producers to remove the original reference to cigarettes in the lyric.

Joe Voci, the show's executive producer, said in an interview with VH1.com that "Unlike other teen shows that are angst-driven, ours is about a group of kids who want to do the right things, and how they handle the obstacles they're presented. The song presented a mood, tone and feel that is optimistic and implies a sense of adventure."

== Reception ==
David Zurawik of The Baltimore Sun described the series as "Shakespeare Summer Lite, with some gender-bending and woodland trysts to go along with the star-crossed lovers." In comparing the series to another debut Ken Tucker of Entertainment Weekly found that "it at least avoids the unearned angst of the summer's other 15-year-olds-in-school show, Fox's hapless Opposite Sex". Harvard creative writing professor Jane Rosenzweig found that Young Americans "has a breadth of focus that's far more true to life than the so-called reality-based shows like MTV's Real World and CBS's summer hit Survivor."

Rob Owen of the Pittsburgh Post-Gazette said that the show presents as though the creator "looked at the blueprints of other WB shows and plucked out the elements that would give his series the best chance for success with the Gen Y set." After naming a checklist of elements of the show that are common to many shows on The WB, Owen says that it is admirable from a business standpoint to make a show in such a manner but that it is not very original. Owen concludes by calling Young Americans "mindless and clichéd" but still "guilty summer fun." Michele Hewitson of The New Zealand Herald compared the show to the film Dead Poets Society and said that it is not often "an American television series manages to exceed all expectations - of utter awfulness."

Despite being a spin-off of one of the most popular WB shows, Young Americans received low ratings throughout its summer run and was canceled in August 2000. As of September 2010 Young Americans ranks 49th among unreleased TV shows on TVShowsOnDVD.
