= Rush (The X-Files) =

- The X-Files episode
- Max Harden meets his end at the hands of Chastity Raines. In order to create the scene, a matte of Max was combined with smoke and a CGI bullet.
- Episode no.: Season 7 Episode 5
- Directed by: Robert Lieberman
- Written by: David Amann
- Production code: 7ABX06
- Original air date: December 5, 1999
- Running time: 44 minutes

Guest appearances
- Rodney Scott as Tony Reed; Scott Cooper as Max Harden; Nicki Aycox as Chastity Raines; Les Lannom as Deputy Foster; Tom Bower as Sheriff Harden; David Wells as Mr. Babbitt; Ann Dowd as Mrs. Reed; Bill Dow as Charles Burks; Rachel Winfree as Nurse; Christopher Wynne as Deputy

Episode chronology
← Previous "Millennium"	Next → "The Goldberg Variation"
- The X-Files season 7

"Rush" is the fifth episode of the seventh season of the science fiction television series The X-Files, and the 144th episode overall. It first aired on the Fox network in the United States on December 5, 1999. It was written by David Amann and directed by Robert Lieberman. The episode is a "Monster-of-the-Week" story, unconnected to the series' wider mythology. "Rush" earned a Nielsen household rating of 7.9, being watched by 12.71 million viewers in its initial broadcast. The episode received mostly mixed reviews from television critics.

The show centers on FBI special agents Fox Mulder (David Duchovny) and Dana Scully (Gillian Anderson) who work on cases linked to the paranormal, called X-Files. Mulder is a believer in the paranormal, while the skeptical Scully has been assigned to debunk his work. In this episode, Mulder and Scully investigate a high school student who is the prime suspect in the bizarre murder of a police officer. They discover that the boy and a couple of friends have been playing with the ability to accelerate their movements to a frequency the human eye cannot perceive.

The idea for "Rush" had been proposed as far back as the sixth season of The X-Files. However, the original plot of the episode—the effects of having super speed—eventually delved into "deeper" themes, such as drug abuse, boredom, and the teenage experience. Although the episode relied on special effects, many of the scenes were created by manipulating the speed of the camera during filming.

== Plot ==
In Pittsfield, Virginia, Tony Reed and two other teenagers meet in the woods late at night, but they are interrupted by a sheriff's deputy. Moments later the deputy is murdered, killed with his own flashlight. Fox Mulder (David Duchovny) and Dana Scully (Gillian Anderson) later examine the deputy's body: the blow that killed the man was so ferocious that his glasses were pushed through the back of his skull. They question Tony, whose fingerprints were found on the flashlight, but he denies any part in the murder. Mulder and Scully agree that Tony is innocent, although Mulder's theory of supernatural involvement is not shared by Scully. Scully, on the other hand, suggests they question Tony's friends.

Mulder and Scully visit Tony's high school and speak with the two teenagers who were with Tony in the woods: the sheriff's son, Max Harden, and his girlfriend Chastity. Chastity seems concerned about Tony when the agents tell her he may go to jail. However, Tony is later released when the murder weapon mysteriously goes missing from the evidence room. Mulder and Scully review video footage from the evidence room that shows the flashlight simply disappearing. However, a blur on the video footage attracts Mulder's attention and later analysis by an expert reveals the blurred object is solid and matches the high school's colors.

When one of the teachers at the high school is attacked and murdered by an unseen force using a table and chair in front of many witnesses, Mulder suspects Max possesses some kind of paranormal ability and is using it to kill. Mulder believes Max's teenage hormones are giving him paranormal abilities that allow him to attack people without touching them. Meanwhile, Tony follows Chastity into a cave in the woods and stumbles upon a bizarre shaft of light. Once Tony steps into the light, he gains the same abilities that Max and Chastity have: the ability to vibrate at high frequencies, allowing Tony to move faster than normal vision can detect.

However, Max collapses and is sent to the hospital, where it is found he is suffering from exhaustion, withdrawal, a concussion, muscular tears and skeletal fractures–signs that his abilities are killing him. Mulder eventually deduces that he possesses superhuman speed. After Chastity sneaks Max out of the hospital, he returns to the cave. Later, the sheriff finds the flashlight in Max's room and confronts his son about the murders. Max confesses and attempts to kill his father, but Tony intervenes, taking the sheriff's gun and leaving behind the flashlight for Mulder and Scully to find; the sheriff is promptly taken to the hospital.

That night, Tony and Chastity head to the cave so that Max won't use up any more of the remaining power. Once there, Chastity has been knocked unconscious by Max, who uses his abilities to take back the gun from Tony before throwing it away. However, Chastity regains consciousness and takes the gun. She shoots Max from behind, then allows herself to be shot by the same bullet just as Mulder and Scully arrive. Afterwards, Tony is seen in the hospital recuperating. Numerous geological experts have examined the cave but were unable to identify anything unusual. The cave is then filled in with concrete, leaving the question as to what caused the events a mystery.

== Production ==
=== Writing and casting ===
The basic concept for "Rush" had been coming together since the show's sixth season. David Amann, who wrote the episode, later explained that the original idea for the episode was simply "[the] effect having the power of super speed would have on troubled teens." However, the story quickly developed "deeper" meanings: drug abuse, boredom, and the teenage experience. According to series creator Chris Carter, the way in which to portray the teenagers on screen was "tricky". He noted, "it had been a long time since we had dealt with teenage angst. [But] it was being done everywhere else and we wanted to take a run at it."

According to series casting director Rick Millikan, choosing actors and actresses for the episode was more difficult than usual. He explained, "It was all teenagers, but this being The X-Files we were looking for something other than the typical 90210-type kids." Millikan eventually cast individuals who could play a "subtle kind of evil", as well as display "arrogance" and "vulnerability". Rodney Scott was cast as Tony Reed; at the time, he was notable for his performance in the television movie Come On, Get Happy: The Partridge Family Story (1999), and for his role as William "Will" Krudski on the popular show Dawson's Creek.

=== Special effects ===
The high speed effects were made by using different frame rates during filming.

While the episode relied heavily on special effects, director Robert Lieberman was able to create many of the necessary scenes simply using different camera speeds. In order to get the proper feel for the rush effects, test footage of assistant director Xochi Blymyer was filmed at 24, 12 FPS, 6 FPS, and 3 frames per second (FPS). After filming, a digital "blur effect" was then added to give the shot an unfocused look. During the scene where the teenagers stumble into the light and receive the speed power, the special effects crew shot two separate shots: one of the teens' bodies and one of the teens' heads rapidly flailing. The special effects crew then "pull[ed] the head[s] off" of the shots featuring the teens moving rapidly, and used them to replace the heads on the shots of the teens' motionless bodies. This method kept their bodies in focus but allowed their heads to rapidly move.

The crew used several different styles for the "bullet time" scene. In order to create the shot, a matte of the bullet wound on Max's chest was combined with smoke and "phony CGI bullets", according to producer Paul Rabwin. The crew tried different tracking devices for the bullet, including a pronounced blur effect, which was later removed in favor of a more realistic "smoke" pathway. The production crew had a difficult time deciding whether or not the bullet should remain at Chastity's speed as she walked towards it, or whether she should pass the bullet; the group eventually went with the latter.

Stunt coordinator Danny Wesiles helped arrange the more frantic shots, such as the scene in which a lunch table kills a teacher. Executive producer Frank Spotnitz later called the scene, "probably one of the most horrific things we've ever done." Due to the violent nature of the episode—and the table scene in particular—Fox's Standards and Practices department had an issue with the series showing "the impact between the table and the man". In order to comply, the impact was removed, but the rest of the scene stayed intact. Spotnitz later noted that, "when you take out the impact, the audience's imagination is ten times worse."

As a comical homage at the beginning of the closing credits, one can hear the sound effect that coincided with Steve Austin's feats of strength as the Bionic Man (from the Six-Million Dollar Man TV series).

== Broadcast and reception ==
"Rush" first aired on the Fox network in the United States on December 5, 1999. This episode earned a Nielsen rating of 7.9, with an 11 share, meaning that roughly 7.9 percent of all television-equipped households, and 11 percent of households watching television, were tuned in to the episode. It was viewed by 12.71 million viewers. The episode aired in the United Kingdom and Ireland on Sky1 on April 16, 2000 and received 0.79 million viewers, making it the sixth most watched episode that week. The episode was later nominated for an Emmy for Outstanding Special Visual Effects for a Dramatic Series as well as an International Monitor Award for Best Achievement in Visual Effects.

The episode received mostly mixed to negative reviews from critics. Paula Vitaris from Cinefantastique gave the episode a mixed review and awarded it two stars out of four. She noted that the episode suffered from a "bland story" filled with "bland teens", noting that the actors playing the three main teenagers were "as generic as can be". Vitaris ultimately concluded that "'Rush' is hardly the worst of The X-Files; it's merely forgettable." Kenneth Silber from Space.com was critical of the episode, arguing that the show was re-using plot lines and that the personalities of the teenagers were wholly uninteresting. He wrote, "This episode unfolds with a bland sense of familiarity. Once again, troubled adolescents are toying with paranormal forces that can only get them into further trouble. Sadly, these adolescents lack interesting personalities, and the force in question remains wholly mysterious." Rich Rosell from Digitally Obsessed awarded the episode 3.5 out of 5 stars and wrote that the episode was "Not brilliant, but moderately entertaining." Robert Shearman, in his book Wanting to Believe: A Critical Guide to The X-Files, Millennium & The Lone Gunmen, rated the episode two stars out of five. Despite praising the episode's set pieces, the reviewer ultimately concluded that "The X-Files just isn't cool anymore daddio."

Not all reviews were so negative. Emily VanDerWerff of The A.V. Club awarded the episode a "B−". While enjoying the premise, she criticized the entry for featuring a guest cast that "mostly sucks". She did, however, positively comment on the scene wherein Max kills his teacher, noting that it "is a brutal, visceral sequence" that the episode could have used more of. Tom Kessenich, in his book Examinations, gave the episode a largely positive review, writing, "'Rush' was sufficiently creepy and had some wonderful character interaction between Mulder and Scully." Furthermore, he noted that the characterization "helped make it a very enjoyable entry into what is quickly becoming a very enjoyable season."

== Bibliography ==
- Kessenich, Tom (2002). Examination: An Unauthorized Look at Seasons 6–9 of the X-Files. Trafford Publishing. ISBN 1-55369-812-6.
- Shapiro, Marc (2000). All Things: The Official Guide to the X-Files Volume 6. Harper Prism. ISBN 0-06-107611-2.
- Shearman, Robert (2009). Wanting to Believe: A Critical Guide to The X-Files, Millennium & The Lone Gunmen. Mad Norwegian Press. ISBN 978-0-9759446-9-1.
