= Rodney Scott (actor) =

American actor

- Born: February 17, 1978 (age 47)
- Occupation: Actor
- Years active: 1991–2011

Rodney Scott (born February 17, 1978) is an American actor best known for playing David Cassidy/Keith Partridge in the 1999 television film Come On Get Happy: The Partridge Family Story, and William 'Will' Krudski, one of the leading characters in the series Young Americans, a role that originated as a three episode character on Dawson's Creek.

== Career ==
Scott was cast in a recurring guest-starring role on The District and a multi-season recurring role on American Dreams. He also appeared in a season seven episode of The X-Files and played the role of Scott Sawyer in one episode of Cold Case.

In 2011, Scott voiced a character in the video game L.A. Noire, developed by Team Bondi and published by Rockstar Games. He portrayed Officer Ralph Dunn who was a partner of the main character Cole Phelps.

== Filmography ==
=== Film ===
Year	Title	Role	Notes
2003	Learning Curves	Brad	
2006	Last Sunset	Sam / Lisa's lover	
2009	The Twenty	Johnny	
2009	Gang Girl	Undercover Cop	
2009	The Strip	Kyle Davis	

=== Television ===
Year	Title	Role	Notes
1992	The Bold and the Beautiful	Orderly	Episode #1.1252
1998	Promised Land	Dylan Grady	Episode: "Anywhere But Here"
1999	Come On Get Happy: The Partridge Family Story	David Cassidy / Keith Partridge	Television film
1999	The X-Files	Tony Reed	Episode: "Rush"
2000	Dawson's Creek	Will Krudski	3 episodes
2000	The Corner	Young DeAndre	3 episodes
2000	Young Americans	William 'Will' Krudski	8 episodes
2001	JAG	Bill Webster	Episode: "Redemption"
2001–2004	The District	Jack Mannion Jr.	5 episodes
2002	Crossing Jordan	Kieran Conroy	Episode: "Four Fathers"
2002–2005	American Dreams	Danny O'Connor	19 episodes
2003	CSI: Miami	Keith	Episode: "Extreme"
2004	NYPD Blue	Ryan Dooling	Episode: "On the Fence"
2005	Cold Case	Scott Sawyer	Episode: "Start-Up"
2005, 2008	Ghost Whisperer	Dan Clancy	2 episodes
2006	NCIS	Brian Dempsey	Episode: "Jeopardy"
2007	Close to Home	Craig Pinter	Episode: "Making Amends"
2008	Aces 'N' Eights	Monty	Television film
2009	The Unit	Marty	Episode: "Hill 60"
