= Harry Martin (urologist) =

American doctor and husband of Louella Parsons

Harry Watson Martin
- Martin and Louella Parsons
- Born: January 16, 1890; Redfield, South Dakota, U.S.
- Died: June 24, 1951 (aged 61); Los Angeles, California, U.S.
- Occupation: Urologist
- Spouses: Sylvia Breamer (m. 1924; div. 1926) Louella Parsons (m. 1930)

Harry Watson Martin (January 16, 1890 – June 24, 1951) was an American urologist and third husband of Louella Parsons.

== Early years and education ==
Harry Martin was the son of Watson Jesse Martin, a dentist, and Annie Amelia Moriarty. He was the younger of two brothers. His paternal grandfather, David D. Martin, was also a physician. Harry Martin graduated from John Marshall High School, Chicago and received his M.D. from what would become the University of Illinois, Chicago, on June 4, 1912. He served in the Army Medical Corps during World War I.

== Hollywood Physician ==
Martin moved to Los Angeles in 1919. He was a urologist who specialized in the treatment of venereal disease. He became medical director of Twentieth Century Fox studios in 1937. He performed abortions and dispensed stimulant drugs to the actors, as needed, to keep them alert while films were being shot.

== Personal life ==
On November 1, 1924, Martin married actress Sylvia Breamer at Glenwood Inn in Riverside, California. She divorced him in 1926, complaining that he failed to return home for meals and treated her with complete indifference, while Martin accused her of cruelty.

He married gossip columnist Louella Parsons in 1930; the couple remained together until he died.

== Death ==
Martin died at Cedars of Lebanon Hospital of a tropical ailment contracted while he served in the South Pacific with the Army Medical Corps during the Second World War. He had been a hospital patient for several weeks, and had been in a coma for a few days. The cause of the persistent fever from which he died was never diagnosed, although he visited Johns Hopkins Hospital, many other leading clinics, and consulted specialists. With him at his death were his wife and step-daughter, Harriet Parsons, a motion-picture producer.

== Selected publications ==
- Robert V. Day, M.D.; Harry W. Martin, M.D. Diverticula of the Urinary Bladder. Feature Observations. JAMA. 1925;84(4):268–272
- Harry W. Martin. Injuries of the Posterior Urethra. Cal West Med. Jan 1936; 44(1): 16–20.
- Harry W. Martin, M.D.; Rachel E. Arbuthnot, M.D. Spinal Anesthesia. A Review Of More Than Six Thousand Cases In The Los Angeles General Hospital, With Especial Consideration Of Genito-Urinary Operations. JAMA. 1926;87(21):1723–1725.
- Harry W. Martin. Ruptured Bladder—A Method of Diagnosis. Cal West Med. Apr 1932; 36(4): 230–232.
- Robert V. Day, M.D.; Harry W. Martin, M.D. Vesical Diverticulum. A Feature Study. JAMA. 1939;112(6):509–513.
- Robert V. Day and Harry W. Martin. Injuries to The Urinary Organs in Relation to Industrial Accidents. Cal West Med. Jul 1925; 23(7): 849–853.
- Harry W. Martin. Cysto-Urethroscopic Resection of the Prostate. Cal West Med. Feb 1932; 36(2): 76–79.
- Day, R. V., Martin, H. W., Kutzmann, A. A., & Kessler, E. E. (1938). Sex hormone therapy for prostatism. The American Journal of Surgery, 39(1), 100–103.
- Martin, Harry W. "The Treatment Of Bladder Neck Contracture Or Median Bar." The Journal of Urology (1930): 313.
