= Shawn Pyfrom =

American actor (born 1986)

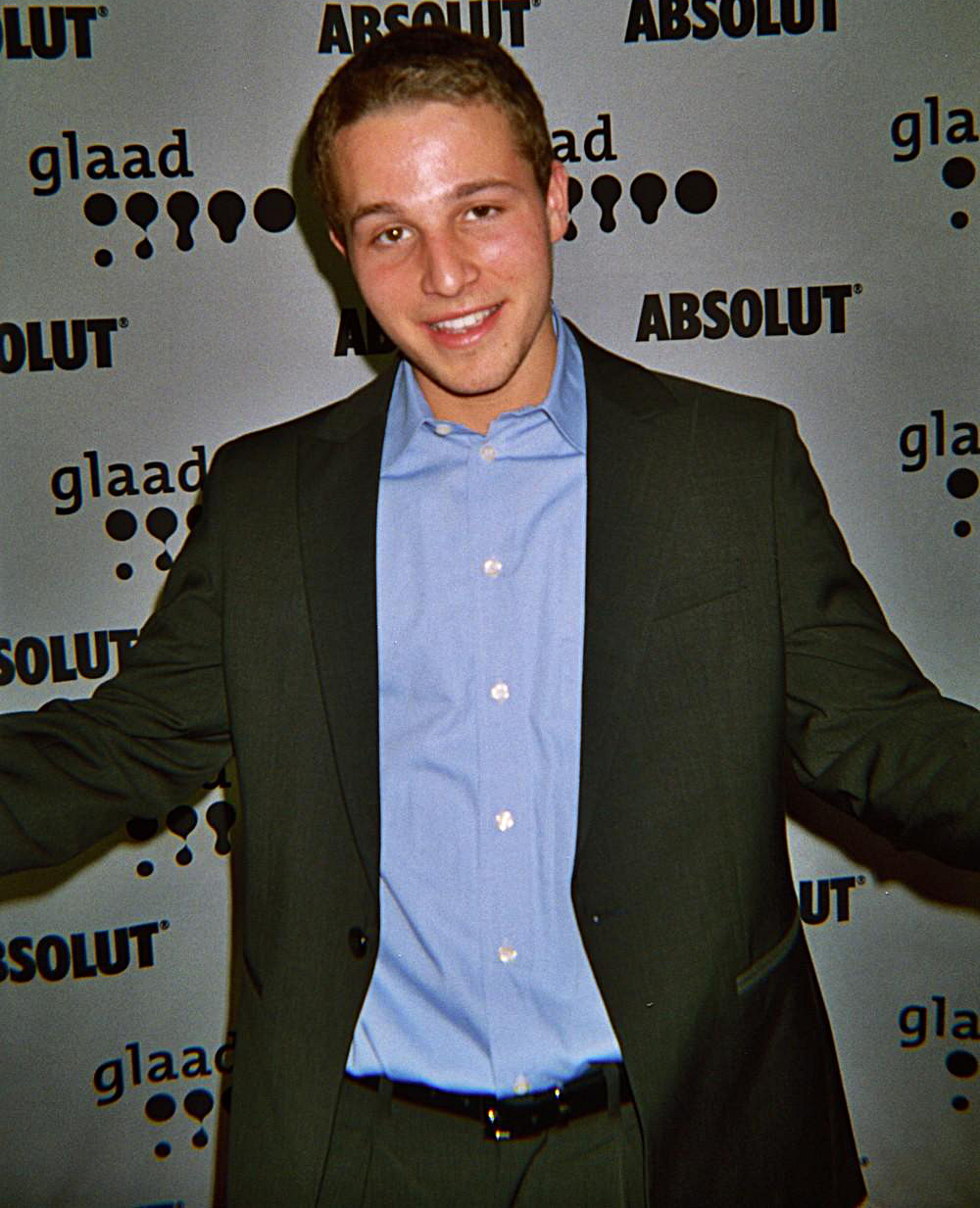
- Pyfrom at the 2007 GLAAD Awards
- Born: Shawn Caminiti Pyfrom; August 16, 1986 (age 40); Tampa, Florida, U.S.
- Occupations: Actor, singer
- Years active: 1995–present

Shawn Caminiti Pyfrom (born August 16, 1986) is an American actor and singer who has appeared in several television series and films. He is best known for his portrayal of Andrew Van de Kamp on ABC's Desperate Housewives and as Lionel Griff in Playhouse Disney's Stanley.

== Early life ==
Pyfrom was born in Tampa, Florida. He is of Welsh, English, Scottish, Irish, Dutch, Italian, German, Hungarian, and French-Canadian descent. "Caminiti," his middle name, is the maiden name of his mother, Gail. Pyfrom has an older brother, Christopher and a younger sister, Amber.

== Career ==
He is best known for his recurring role as Andrew Van de Kamp, the son of Bree Van de Kamp (Marcia Cross) and Rex Van de Kamp (Steven Culp) on ABC's Desperate Housewives. He played the role as a recurring guest appearance throughout the show's first season (2004–2005). After appearing in the entire second season as a supporting cast member (for which he was credited in the opening credits) and appearing in the third season and fourth season, he returned in the fifth season as a full-fledged series regular. Shawn appeared in the Walt Disney Pictures film The Shaggy Dog (2006) opposite Tim Allen and Kristin Davis and the film The Darkroom (2007) opposite Erin Foster. In 2009, Pyfrom left Desperate Housewives as a series regular but continued to make frequent guest appearances, including the final season.

In the wake of Philip Seymour Hoffman's death in 2014 by overdose, Pyfrom admitted five-month recovery as of February 2014 from drug addiction and alcoholism.

== Filmography ==
Film

Year	Title	Role	Notes
1999	Belle's Tales of Friendship	Shawn	Direct-to-video
2000	Pay It Forward	Shawn	
2000	A Day in a Life	Jeremy	
2001	Max Keeble's Big Move	Bus prankster	
2002	Sum 41: Fatlip	Teenager #6	Short film
2005	Stanley's Dinosaur Round-Up	Lionel Griff	Voice role
2006	The Shaggy Dog	Trey	
2006	The Darkroom	Stanley	
2009	The Alyson Stoner Project	Tagger	Video
2009	Tanner Hall	Hank	
2009	The Juggler	The cash collector	Short film
2011	The Sexy Dark Ages	Rowan	Short film
2011	Skin	Matthew	Short film
2017	Hard Surfaces	Adrian Jacobs	
2018	Hellbent	Billy	
2018	Randy's Canvas	Butch	
2020	Model Citizen	Tyler Walton	

=== Television ===
Year	Title	Role	Notes
1995	The Cape	Jerry Blake	1 episode
1995	Sing Me a Story with Belle	Shawn	2 episodes
1998	Pumpkin Man	Austin	TV movie
1998	A Wing and a Prayer	Justin	TV movie
1998	From the Earth to the Moon	Ten year old boy	Miniseries; 1 episode
1998	Chicago Hope	Jonah 'Jessica' Boyd	1 episode
1998	Ellen	Boy scout	1 episode
1998	L.A. Doctors	Kevin Claybourne	1 episode
1998	The Drew Carey Show	Mark Foster	1 episode
1998	My Hometown	Jamie / Dylan	2 episodes
1999	Buffy the Vampire Slayer	Little boy	1 episode
1999	Michael Landon, the Father I Knew	Michael Landon Jr. (age 10)	TV movie
1999	The Night of the Headless Horseman	Schoolboy	TV movie; voice role
1999	Come On Get Happy: The Partridge Family Story	Danny Bonaduce	TV movie
1999	Touched by an Angel	Aaron Berger	1 episode
1999	H-E Double Hockey Sticks	Lewis	TV movie
2000	Recess	Zack	1 episode; voice role
2000	The Trouble with Normal	Douglas	1 episode
2000	The Amanda Show		1 episode
2000–2001	7th Heaven	Bobby Carver	2 episodes
2000–2001	Family Guy	Oliver	2 episodes; voice role
2001	The Kids from Room 402	Jesse	1 episode
2001	Reba	Bryan	1 episode
2001	What's Up, Peter Fuddy?		TV movie
2001–2003	Stanley	Lionel Griff	13 episodes; main voice role
2002	Malcolm in the Middle	Eddie	1 episode
2002	Rocket Power	Skateboarder	Miniseries; 1 episode; voice role
2002	State of Grace	Logan	3 episodes
2003	Oliver Beene	Bill	1 episode
2003	My Life with Men	Sam	TV movie
2003	The Division	John Jr. at 15 / Cory Kenner	2 episodes
2003	The Brothers García	Jake Brody	1 episode
2004	Drake & Josh	Michael	1 episode
2004	Century City	Julian Hann	1 episode
2004	Nip/Tuck	Trevor Hayes	1 episode
2004	8 Simple Rules	Jake	1 episode
2004–2012	Desperate Housewives	Andrew Van de Kamp	Recurring role (season 1); Also starring (seasons 2-4); Main role (season 5); Special guest star (seasons 6-8); 112 episodes
2004–2005	Still Standing	Matthew Halverson	2 episodes
2006	The Jake Effect	Orson Carlyle	1 episode
2009	CSI: Miami	Daniel Burgess	1 episode
2012	Rizzoli & Isles	Bradley Palmer	1 episode
2013	Killing Lincoln	John W. Nichols	TV movie
2022	The Rookie	Driver	1 episode

=== Awards and nominations ===
Year	Award	Category	Nominated work	Result
1999	Young Artist Awards	Best Performance in a TV Movie, Pilot, Mini-Series or Series – Supporting Young Actor	A Wing and a Prayer	Nominated
2000	YoungStar Awards	Best Young Actor Performance in a Miniseries or Made-For-TV Film	Come On Get Happy: The Partridge Family Story	Nominated
2001	Young Artist Awards	Best Performance in a TV Drama Series – Guest Starring Young Actor	Touched by an Angel	Nominated
2002	Young Artist Awards	Best Performance in a TV Drama Series – Guest Starring Young Actor	The Division	Nominated
2002	Young Artist Awards	Best Performance in a TV Comedy Series – Guest Starring Young Actor	Reba	Won
2003	Young Artist Awards	Best Performance in a Voice-Over Role	Stanley	Nominated
2006	Gold Derby Awards	Ensemble of the Year (shared with the cast)	Desperate Housewives	Nominated
2007	Screen Actors Guild Awards	Outstanding Performance by an Ensemble in a Comedy Series (shared with the cast)	Desperate Housewives	Nominated
2008	Screen Actors Guild Awards	Outstanding Performance by an Ensemble in a Comedy Series (shared with the cast)	Desperate Housewives	Nominated
2009	Screen Actors Guild Awards	Outstanding Performance by an Ensemble in a Comedy Series (shared with the cast)	Desperate Housewives	Nominated
2018	Idyllwild International Festival of Cinema	Best Actor – Feature	Hard Surfaces	Nominated
