= Night Song (1948 film) =

1948 film by John Cromwell

- 1948 theatrical poster
- Directed by: John Cromwell
- Screenplay by: Frank Fenton; Dick Irving Hyland; DeWitt Bodeen (adaptation)
- Story by: Dick Irving Hyland
- Produced by: Harriet Parsons
- Starring: Dana Andrews; Merle Oberon; Ethel Barrymore
- Cinematography: Lucien Ballard
- Edited by: Harry Marker
- Music by: Leith Stevens; Constantin Bakaleinikoff
- Distributed by: RKO Radio Pictures
- Release date: January 20, 1948 (U.S.)
- Running time: 102 minutes
- Country: United States
- Language: English
- Box office: $1.7 million (US rentals)

Night Song is a 1948 American drama film directed by John Cromwell. Its cast included Dana Andrews, Merle Oberon and Ethel Barrymore.

== Plot ==
Wealthy San Francisco socialite Cathy Mallory is entranced by the music of blind nightclub pianist Dan Evans. He is bitter and resents a rich lady's attempt to become his patron.

Bandleader Chick Morgan informs Cathy that Dan has quit. Cathy arranges to meet Dan at the beach and introduces herself as Mary Willey, a woman of limited means who is also blind. They begin a romantic relationship, and Dan explains how he lost his sight in an automobile accident.

To continue the ruse, Cathy and longtime companion Mrs. Willey rent an inexpensive apartment. Dan is persuaded to resume writing a piano concerto. Dan needs $5,000 to undergo an operation in New York to restore his sight. Cathy sponsors a music contest with a $5,000 prize there, confident that Dan's composition will win. The winning entry will also be performed at Carnegie Hall by the famed pianist Arthur Rubinstein.

At the contest, Dan meets Cathy and is attracted to her. After a successful operation he enjoys his newfound sight, spending time with her, but later listening to the concert stirs memories of Mary. He passes word through Chick that he is returning to Mary. He and Chick take the train while Cathy flies back to the inexpensive apartment on the West Coast. When Dan arrives at the apartment, he hears his music being played on Mary's piano. He walks in, sees who it is, and smiles. Her aunt watches approvingly from another room as they embrace.

== Cast ==
- Dana Andrews as Dan Evans
- Merle Oberon as Cathy Mallory / Mary Willey
- Ethel Barrymore as Miss Willey
- Hoagy Carmichael as Chick Morgan
- Arthur Rubinstein as himself
- Eugene Ormandy as himself
- Jacqueline White as Connie
- Donald Curtis as George
- Walter Reed as Jimmy
- Jane Jones as Mamie

== Production ==
The film's working titles were Counterpoint and Memory of Love. RKO borrowed Dana Andrews from Samuel Goldwyn's company for the project.

Andrews wore special contact lenses that made his eyes appear damaged and limited his eyesight.

Scenes were shot in San Francisco, Trancas Beach and Lake Arrowhead, California, as well as various locations in New York City. Because of logistical problems at Carnegie Hall, the entire concert was filmed on a soundstage.

== Reception ==
In a contemporary review for The New York Times, critic Bosley Crowther panned the film's "incredibly mawkish plot" and added: "Our old friend, the young musician who has a great concerto chasing through his mind but can't get it down on paper because—well, something's eating on him, is back again...and, so far as this reviewer sees things, neither he nor his concerto are improved. As a matter of fact, for our money, they are both worn uncomfortably thin in comparison to previous incarnations, and neither is long for this world...[T]he music, the prize concerto—well, that is really the thing which puts Night Song in the spotlight as baldfaced and absolute sham. For this scrappy and meaningless jangle by Leith Stevens is good for nothing more than an excuse for filming the fiddles, the drums and the batteries of horns."

The film recorded a loss of $1,040,000.

== Radio broadcast ==
Andrews reprised his role in a May 29, 1950 Lux Radio Theatre broadcast costarring Joan Fontaine.
