= Son of the Dragon (film) =

2008 film directed by David Wu

- Teleplay by: Jacqueline Feather; David Seidler
- Story by: Dominic Minghella
- Directed by: David Wu
- Starring: John Reardon; David Carradine
- Theme music composer: Lawrence Shragge
- Countries of origin: United States; Canada
- Original language: English

Production
- Producers: Matt Fitzsimons; Erik Heiberg; James Wilberger
- Cinematography: Thomas Burstyn
- Editor: David Wu
- Running time: 174 minutes

Original release
- Network: Hallmark Movie Channel
- Release: April 2, 2008

Son of the Dragon is the first Hallmark Movie Channel original television film. It premiered on Hallmark Movie Channel on Wednesday, April 2, 2008, and helped launch the new channel. It was the first movie for Hallmark to be shot and shown in HDTV.

== Plot summary ==
An adaptation of the classic Arabian Nights tale "The Story of Ala al-Din and The Magic Lamp" is adapted and relocated to ancient China.

D.B. (or "Devil Boy") was abandoned at birth and rescued from the docks of Shanghai to grow into an impetuous thief who steals to provide food for the street children he considers his family. Now the young man and his wise partner Bird, have their eyes on stealing the royal court's jewels. They devise a plan to get into the court by wooing the Governor's daughter, Princess Li Wei with whom he is immediately attracted to. However, they are met with strong competition from other potential suitors, especially the Prince of the North who is the Governor's personal choice. The Princess, however, finds D.B. most intriguing and manages to convince her father to challenge all her suitors with rigorous trials to prove their worth.

As various suitors proceed with the tests put before them, the Princess sends along her lady-in-waiting, Ting Ting, disguised as a man to keep D.B. safe. However, the Princess doesn't know that Ting Ting already knows D.B. and has her own secret feelings for him.

== Cast ==
- John Reardon as D.B. (or "Devil Boy")
- David Carradine as Bird
- Desiree Ann Siahaan as Princess Li Wei
- Rupert Graves as The Prince of the North
- Theresa Lee as Ting Ting
- Kay Tong Lim as Governor
- Eddy Ko as Lord Shing
- Michael Chow as Bo

== Filming locations ==
Filming took place in Hengdian TV City, China, and Yong Kang Shiguliao Film and Television Studio in Zhejiang Province, China. The location houses an exact replica of the Forbidden City.

== Home media ==
This film was released in DVD format in October 2007, with English audio, no subtitles, and a running time of 174 min., by RHI Entertainment. In July 2015 it was released in DVD format by Mill Creek Entertainment, with English audio, no subtitles, and a running time of 178 min.
