= Never a Dull Moment (1950 film) =

1950 film by George Marshall

- Theatrical release poster
- Directed by: George Marshall
- Screenplay by: Lou Breslow; Doris Anderson
- Based on: Who Could Ask for Anything More by Kay Swift
- Produced by: Harriet Parsons
- Starring: Irene Dunne; Fred MacMurray
- Cinematography: Joseph Walker, A.S.C.
- Edited by: Robert Swink
- Music by: Frederick Hollander
- Production company: RKO Radio Pictures
- Distributed by: RKO Radio Pictures
- Release dates: November 21, 1950 (New York City); November 22, 1950 (United States)
- Running time: 89 minutes
- Country: United States
- Language: English
- Budget: $1.2 million
- Box office: $1.4 million (US) or $1.8 million

Never a Dull Moment is a 1950 American comedy western film from RKO Pictures, starring Irene Dunne and Fred MacMurray. The film is based on the 1943 book Who Could Ask For Anything More? by Kay Swift. The filming took place between December 5, 1949, and February 1, 1950, in Thousand Oaks, California. It has no relation to the 1968 Disney film of the same name starring Dick Van Dyke and Edward G. Robinson.

== Plot ==
At a rodeo in New York, visiting cowboy Chris Heyward is charmed to make the acquaintance of Kay Kingsley, a songwriter. They marry and move out west to his ranch in Wyoming. Here, she meets Chris' two daughters from a previous marriage, Nan and Tina, and his old romantic interest, Jean Morrow.

Kay tries to adjust to her new life in Wyoming, but it is hard: a windstorm threatens their home, and the children are leery of her. A rival rancher named Mears holds the water rights to his land; Kay accidentally humiliates him at a dance and kills his prize steer.

Kay is eventually offered a job back in New York that could help pay for the water rights. She takes it, but Chris is alienated; he needs to be persuaded by the kids to return east and win her back.

== Cast ==
- Irene Dunne as Kay
- Fred MacMurray as Chris
- William Demarest as Mears
- Andy Devine as Orvie
- Gigi Perreau as Tina
- Natalie Wood as Nan
- Philip Ober as Jed
- Jack Kirkwood as Papa Dude
- Ann Doran as Jean

Uncredited (in order of appearance)

- Jacqueline deWit as Myra Van Elson, Kay's sarcastic friend
- Lela Bliss as Mama Dude
- Irving Bacon as Tunk Johnson
- Gene Evans as Hunter
- Olin Howland as Hunter
- Paul Newlan as Hunter
- Chester Conklin as Albert
- Jimmy Hawkins as Chalmers
- Mason Alan Dinehart as Sonny Boy
- Dan White as Shivaree participant
- Victoria Horne as Shivaree participant

== Songs by Kay Swift ==
- "Once You Find Your Guy" (sung by Dunne in the film's opening minutes)
- "The Man with the Big Felt Hat"
- "Sagebrush Lullaby"

== Reception ==
The New York Times critic Bosley Crowther described the film as a "miserably tedious farce" whose "sole achievement as entertainment is the presentation of Irene Dunne in a series of rustic encounters that are about as funny as stepping on a nail."
