= Jacqueline Feather =

New Zealand born America-based screenwriter for television and film

Jacqueline Feather is a New Zealand born America-based screenwriter for television and film. Her credits include Malice in Wonderland (1985), The King and I (1999) and Kung Fu Killer (2008). With her then writing partner and former husband David Seidler she is a four times nominee and one-time winner of the Writers Guild of America Award, winning in 1989. Today, aside from her writing she is a Jungian Analyst in private practice and a Training Analyst at the C.G. Jung Study Center of Southern California.

== Biography ==
Born in New Zealand to art teacher parents, her grandfather was the theatre critic for National Radio. She took a B.F.A. at the University of Auckland in 1976 before moving to the United States in her early 20s where she followed a 25-year career as solo screenwriter and as a member of the Feather & Seidler writing team, with Academy Awards winner David Seidler. Among Feather's screenplays are Whose Child Is This? The War for Baby Jessica (1993), Dancing in the Dark (1995), Goldrush: A Real Life Alaskan Adventure (1988), Onassis: The Richest Man in the World (1988), Quest for Camelot (1998), Come On Get Happy: The Partridge Family Story (1999) and Son of the Dragon (2008).

Having taken an M.A. in Counseling Psychology and a Ph.D in Mythological Studies with an Emphasis in Depth Psychology at the Pacifica Graduate Institute (2001–2008), she then undertook six years analytic training. Today she continues her writing alongside practicing as a Jungian Analyst/Depth psychotherapist in Ojai California, and is a Training Analyst at the C.G. Jung Study Center of Southern California.

== Writing credits ==
Production	Notes	Broadcaster
Another World	"Episode #1.4336" (1981) (co-written with David Seidler)	NBC
Malice in Wonderland	Television film (1985) (co-written with David Seidler)	CBS
Onassis: The Richest Man in the World	Television film (1988) (co-written with David Seidler)	ABC
My Father, My Son	Television film (1988) (co-written with David Seidler)	CBS
Whose Child Is This? The War for Baby Jessica	Television film (1993) (co-written with David Seidler)	ABC
Dancing in the Dark	Television film (1995) (co-written with David Seidler)	Lifetime Television
Goldrush: A Real Life Alaskan Adventure	Television film (1998) (co-written with David Seidler)	Walt Disney Television
Quest for Camelot	Feature film (1998) (co-written with David Seidler)	N/A
The King and I	Feature film (1999) (co-written with David Seidler)	N/A
Come On, Get Happy: The Partridge Family Story	Television film (1999) (co-written with David Seidler)	ABC
Madeline: Lost in Paris	Direct-to-video film (1999) (co-written with David Seidler)	N/A
By Dawn's Early Light	Television film (2000) (co-written with David Seidler)	Showtime
Soraya	Television film (co-written with Anna Samueli, David Seidler and Umberto Marino, 2003)	RAI
Son of the Dragon	Television miniseries (2006) (co-written with David Seidler)	Hallmark Movie Channel
Kung Fu Killer	Television film (2008) (co-written with David Seidler)	Spike TV

== Awards and nominations ==
Year	Award	Work	Category	Result	Reference
1989	Writers Guild of America Award	My Father, My Son	Original Long Form (with David Seidler)	Nominated	
1989	Writers Guild of America Award	Onassis: The Richest Man in the World	Adapted Long Form (with David Seidler; tied with Susan Cooper for the Hallmark Hall of Fame episode "Foxfire".)	Won	
2002	Writers Guild of America Award	By Dawn's Early Light	Children's Script (with David Seidler)	Nominated	
2009	Writers Guild of America Award	Marc and the Space Invaders	Best unproduced animated screenplay (with David Seidler)	Nominated	
