= David Seidler =

British-American playwright, film, and television writer (1937–2024)

- Seidler in 1957
- Born: 4 August 1937; London, England
- Died: 16 March 2024 (aged 86); New Zealand
- Occupations: Playwright, screenwriter
- Notable work: The King's Speech
- Spouses: Mary Ann Tharaldsen (m. 1961, divorced) Huia Newton (divorced) Jacqueline Feather (div. 2008)

David Seidler (4 August 1937 – 16 March 2024) was a British-American playwright and film and television writer.

Seidler is most known for writing the scripts for the stage version and screen version for the story The King's Speech. For the film, he won the Academy Award and a BAFTA for Best Original Screenplay.

== Early life and family ==
Seidler was born in London, where he spent his early childhood. He grew up in an upper-middle class Jewish family. His mother Doris was a print-maker and graphic artist. His father Bernard was a fur broker who bought bales of pelts on commission. He had an office in New York City. Seidler immigrated to the United States with his family in the early part of World War II during the London Blitz. The ship they sailed on was a member of a convoy of three ships; on the way one of these, carrying Italian prisoners-of-war from North Africa, was sunk by German U-boats. It was on the voyage to the US that Seidler developed a stammer, before he celebrated his third birthday.

Seidler subsequently grew up on Long Island, New York. Seidler believed that his stutter might have been a response to the emotional trauma of the war. Thinking it would make others feel uncomfortable, as a teenager he often chose to keep quiet.

Numerous forms of speech therapy failed him, until, at 16, he had a breakthrough. "I resolved that if I was going to stutter for the rest of my life, people were going to be stuck listening to me. I had been depressed, but now I was angry – I decided I deserved to be heard." That is when, in rage he spoke the 'F' word, or "naughty word" as he recalled decades later. Two weeks later he auditioned for his school play, Shaw's Androcles and the Lion and even got a small role, of a Christian getting eaten by a lion. In 2005, he used it in a scene in his stage play about George VI. Seidler later attended Cornell University, where he graduated with a degree in English in 1959.

As he grew older he decided to write and his first work was The Adventures of a Penny about a penny's travel from hand to hand. In an interview Seidler recalled George VI as a childhood hero, who gave him hope as he listened to his wartime speeches as a child, encouraged by his parents, "David, he was a much worse stutterer than you, and listen to him now. He's not perfect. But he can give these magnificent, stirring addresses that rallied the free world." they would say.

== Career ==
Seidler arrived in Hollywood at the age of 40, and his first job there was writing Tucker: The Man and His Dream for Francis Ford Coppola. For some years he was a member of the Feather & Seidler writing team with Jacqueline Feather.

Always wanting to write about George VI, and being a stutterer himself, Seidler started researching in the 1970s. After finding the surviving son of Lionel Logue, Valentine Logue, a brain surgeon, he wrote him in 1981. In turn, Logue was keen to talk with Seidler and even share the notebooks his father kept while treating the King, but on the condition that he received "written permission from the Queen Mother" first. Upon writing to her, Seidler received a reply from her private secretary, asking him not to pursue the project during her lifetime. Consequently, Seidler abandoned the project in 1982.

The Queen Mother died in 2002, but Seidler didn't start the work until 2005, when he suffered from throat cancer, and returned to the story during a bout of creative work it inspired. Eventually, he wrote the first draft of his screenplay, and his then-wife and writing partner suggested that he rewrite it as a stage play, as an exercise. She felt that the "physical confines of the stage would force him to focus on the key relationships in the story, without the distractions imposed by concern for cinematic technique." In 2011 Seidler won a BAFTA award for Best Original Screenplay, and later an Academy Award for Best Original Screenplay for the film The King's Speech.

When writing the script, Seidler discovered that his own uncle, also named David and also a stutterer, had been sent to see Lionel Logue by his father (Seidler's grandfather).

== Death ==
Seidler died in New Zealand on 16 March 2024, at the age of 86. He was married to Mary Ann Tharaldsen, Huia Newton and Jacqueline Feather.

== Writing credits ==
| Year | Title | Notes |
|---|---|---|
| 1965–1967 | Adventures of the Seaspray | 6 episodes |
| 1981 | Another World | 1 episode |
| 1985 | Malice in Wonderland | TV film |
| 1988 | Onassis: The Richest Man in the World | TV film |
| 1988 | My Father, My Son | TV film |
| 1988 | Tucker: The Man and His Dream | Feature film (co-credit with Arnold Schulman,) |
| 1993 | Whose Child Is This? The War for Baby Jessica | TV film, co-written with Jacqueline Feather |
| 1995 | Dancing in the Dark | TV film (co-written with Jacqueline Feather) |
| 1997 | Lies He Told | TV film (co-written with Jacqueline Feather) |
| 1997 | Time to Say Goodbye? | Feature film (co-written with Jacqueline Feather) |
| 1998 | Goldrush: A Real Life Alaskan Adventure | TV film (co-written with Jacqueline Feather) |
| 1998 | Quest for Camelot | Feature film (co-written with Jacqueline Feather) |
| 1999 | The King and I | Feature film (co-written with Jacqueline Feather) |
| 1999 | Come On, Get Happy: The Partridge Family Story | TV film (co-written with Jacqueline Feather) |
| 1999 | Madeline: Lost in Paris | Direct-to-video film (co-written with Jacqueline Feather) |
| 2000 | By Dawn's Early Light | TV film (co-written with Jacqueline Feather) |
| 2003 | Soraya | TV film (co-written with Jacqueline Feather) |
| 2006 | Son of the Dragon | 2 episodes (co-written with Jacqueline Feather) |
| 2008 | Kung Fu Killer | TV film (co-written with Jacqueline Feather) |
| 2010 | The King's Speech | Feature film |
| 2016 | Queen of Spades | Feature film |

== Awards and nominations ==
| Year | Award | Work | Category | Result | Reference |
|---|---|---|---|---|---|
| 1989 | Writers Guild of America Award | My Father, My Son | Original Long Form (with Jacqueline Feather) | Nominated | |
| 1989 | Writers Guild of America Award | Onassis: The Richest Man in the World | Adapted Long Form (with Jacqueline Feather; tied with Susan Cooper for the Hallmark Hall of Fame episode "Foxfire".) | Won | |
| 2002 | Writers Guild of America Award | By Dawn's Early Light | Children's Script (with Jacqueline Feather) | Nominated | |
| 2010 | Alliance of Women Film Journalists Award | The King's Speech | Best Writing, Original Screenplay | Nominated | |
| 2010 | Awards Circuit Community Awards | The King's Speech | Best Original Screenplay (2nd place) | Won | |
| 2010 | Awards Circuit Community Awards | The King's Speech | Davis Award for Best Original Screenplay | Nominated | |
| 2010 | British Independent Film Awards | The King's Speech | Best Screenplay | Won | |
| 2010 | Chicago Film Critics Association Awards | The King's Speech | Best Screenplay, Original | Nominated | |
| 2010 | Denver Film Critics Society | The King's Speech | Best Writing, Original Screenplay | Nominated | |
| 2010 | Los Angeles Film Critics Association Awards | The King's Speech | Best Screenplay (2nd place) | Won | |
| 2010 | San Diego Film Critics Society Awards | The King's Speech | Best Screenplay, Original | Nominated | |
| 2010 | San Francisco Film Critics Circle | The King's Speech | Best Original Screenplay | Won | |
| 2010 | Satellite Awards | The King's Speech | Best Original Screenplay | Won | |
| 2010 | Southeastern Film Critics Association Awards | The King's Speech | Best Screenplay, Original | Won | |
| 2010 | St. Louis Film Critics Association | The King's Speech | Best Original Screenplay | Won | |
| 2010 | Village Voice Film Poll | The King's Speech | Best Screenplay | Nominated | |
| 2010 | Washington DC Area Film Critics Association Awards | The King's Speech | Best Original Screenplay | Nominated | |
| 2011 | Academy Award | The King's Speech | Best Original Screenplay | Won | |
| 2011 | Golden Globe Award | The King's Speech | Best Screenplay – Motion Picture | Nominated | |
| 2011 | British Academy Film Awards | The King's Speech | Best Original Screenplay | Won | |
| 2011 | British Academy Film Awards | The King's Speech | Alexander Korda Award for Best British Film (with Emile Sherman, Gareth Unwin, Iain Canning and Tom Hooper) | Won | |
| 2011 | Central Ohio Film Critics Association Awards | The King's Speech | Best Screenplay, Original | Nominated | |
| 2011 | Chlotrudis Awards | The King's Speech | Best Original Screenplay | Nominated | |
| 2011 | Critics' Choice Movie Award | The King's Speech | Best Original Screenplay | Won | |
| 2011 | European Film Awards | The King's Speech | Best Film (with Emile Sherman, Gareth Unwin, Iain Canning and Tom Hooper) | Nominated | |
| 2011 | Humanitas Prize | The King's Speech | Feature Film Category | Won | |
| 2011 | Italian Online Movie Awards | The King's Speech | Best Original Screenplay | Nominated | |
| 2011 | London Critics Circle Film Awards | The King's Speech | Screenwriter of the Year | Nominated | |
| 2011 | National Society of Film Critics Awards | The King's Speech | Best Screenplay (2nd place) | Won | |
| 2011 | Online Film & Television Association Awards | The King's Speech | Best Writing, Screenplay Written Directly for the Screen | Nominated | |
| 2011 | Online Film Critics Society Awards | The King's Speech | Best Screenplay, Original | Nominated | |
| 2011 | Toronto Film Critics Association Awards | The King's Speech | Best Screenplay | Nominated | |
