= Louella Parsons =

American gossip columnist (1881–1972)

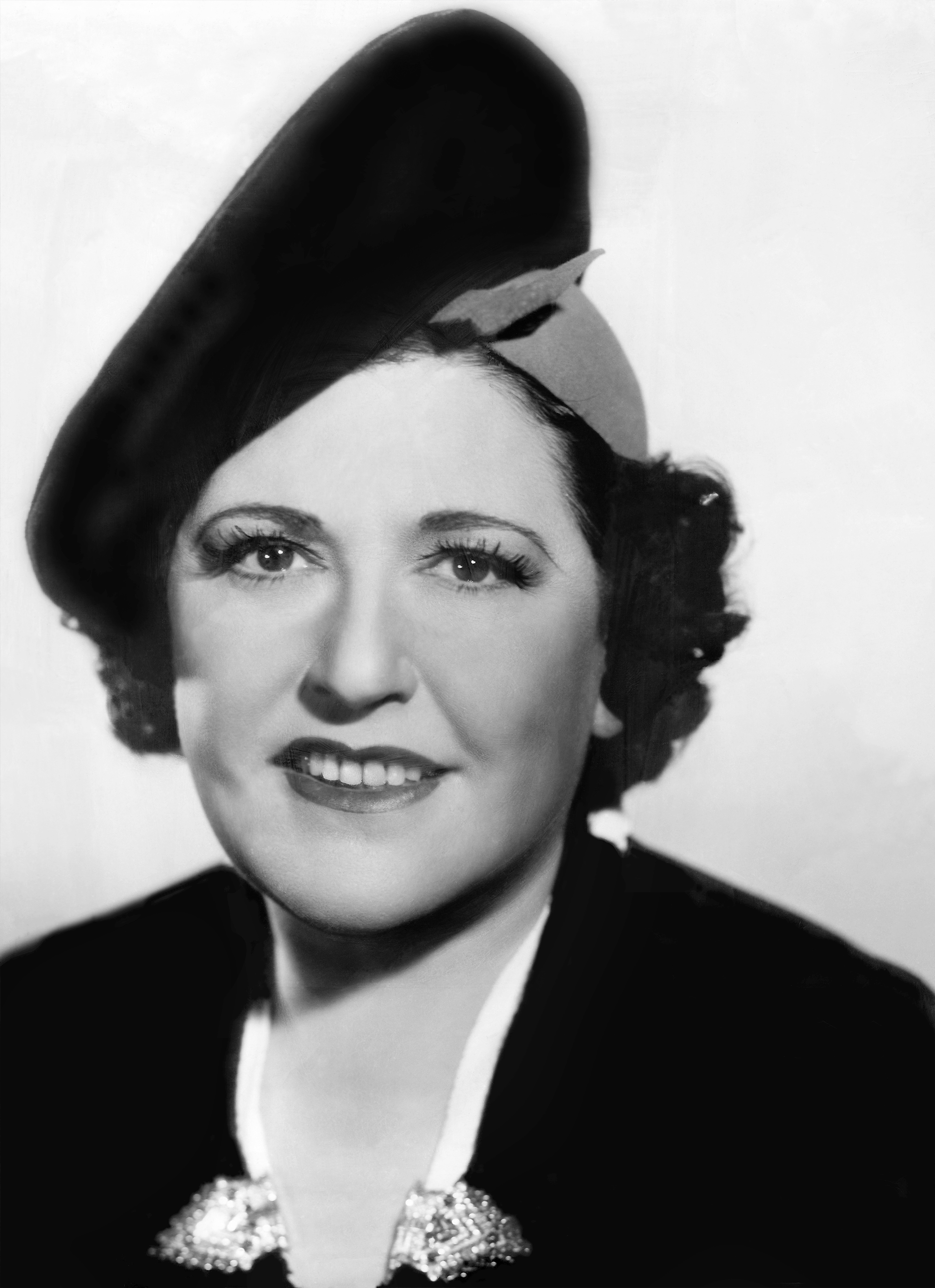
- Parsons in 1937
- Born: Louella Rose Oettinger; August 6, 1881; Freeport, Illinois, U.S.
- Died: December 9, 1972 (aged 91); Santa Monica, California, U.S.
- Resting place: Holy Cross Cemetery
- Occupations: Gossip columnist; screenwriter
- Years active: 1902–1965
- Spouses: John Dement Parsons (m. 1905; div. 1914) John McCaffrey Jr. (m. 1915; div. 1929) Harry W. Martin (m. 1930; died 1951)
- Children: Harriet Parsons
- Awards: Hollywood Walk of Fame

Louella Rose Oettinger Parsons (August 6, 1881 – December 9, 1972), was an American gossip columnist and screenwriter. At her peak, her columns were read by 20 million people in 700 newspapers worldwide.

She was the first writer of a dedicated column on motion pictures in the United States, writing one in 1914 for the Chicago Record-Herald. She later started a similar column for the New York Morning Telegraph, being lured away by William Randolph Hearst's New York American in 1924 because she had championed Hearst's mistress Marion Davies. She subsequently became an influential figure in Hollywood, based at Hearst's Los Angeles Examiner, and remained the unchallenged "Queen of Hollywood gossip" until the arrival of the flamboyant Hedda Hopper, with whom she feuded for years.

== Early life ==
Parsons was born Louella Rose Oettinger in Freeport, Illinois, the daughter of Helen (née Stine) and Joshua Oettinger. Her father was of German Jewish descent, as was her maternal grandfather, while her maternal grandmother, Jeanette Wilcox, was of Irish origin. During her childhood, her parents attended an Episcopal church. She had two brothers, Edwin and Fred, and a sister, Rae. In 1890, her widowed mother married John H. Edwards. They lived in Dixon, Illinois.

Parsons decided to become a writer or a reporter during high school. At her 1901 high school graduation, she gave a foretelling speech, titled "Great Men", after which her principal announced that she would become a great writer.

After high school, Parsons enrolled in a teacher's course at a local Dixon college. She received a financial contribution from a distant German relative. While still in college, Parsons obtained her first newspaper job as a part-time writer for the Dixon Star. In 1902, she became the first female journalist in Dixon, where she gossiped about Dixon social circles, making a step towards her Hollywood career.

She and her first husband, John Parsons, moved to Burlington, Iowa. Her only child, Harriet (1906–1983), who grew up to become a film producer, was born there. While in Burlington, Parsons saw her first motion picture, The Great Train Robbery (1903).

== Career ==
=== Motion pictures and reporter ===
When her marriage broke up, Parsons moved to Chicago. In 1912, she had her first taste of the movie industry working for George K. Spoor as a scenario writer at the Essanay Studios in Chicago, selling her first script for $25. Her daughter, Harriet, was billed as "Baby Parsons" in several movies, which included The Magic Wand (1912), written by Parsons. She also wrote a book titled How to Write for the Movies.

In 1914, Parsons began writing the first movie gossip column in the United States for the Chicago Record Herald. During her early career in Chicago, Parsons also worked as a reporter for the Herald: “My most interesting assignment happened when I was on the Chicago Herald. I was told to cover the Eastland disaster… I was instructed to visit the homes of the afflicted and get their personal stories.”

=== Hearst Corporation ===
William Randolph Hearst bought that Chicago Herald newspaper in 1918 and Parsons was out of a job, as Hearst had not yet discovered that movies and movie personalities were news. Parsons then moved to New York City and started working for the New York Morning Telegraph writing a similar movie column, which attracted the attention of Hearst after he saw her interview of his mistress and protégé Marion Davies. Parsons had encouraged readers to "give this girl a chance" while the majority of critics disparaged Davies. Parsons showered the former chorus girl with praise which led to a friendship between the two women and spurred an offer from Hearst in 1923 for her to become the $200-a-week (equal to $3,779 today) motion-picture editor of his New York American. Her perpetual praise of Davies did not go unnoticed by others. The phrase "Marion never looked lovelier" became a standard in her column and a tongue-in-cheek cultural catchphrase.

There was persistent speculation that Parsons was elevated to her position as the Hearst chain's lead gossip columnist because of a scandal about which she did not write. In 1924, director Thomas Ince died after being carried off Hearst's yacht, allegedly to be hospitalized for indigestion. Many Hearst newspapers falsely claimed that Ince had not been aboard the boat at all and had fallen ill at the newspaper mogul's home. Charlie Chaplin's secretary reported seeing a bullet hole in Ince's head when he was removed from the yacht. Rumors proliferated that Chaplin was having an affair with Hearst's mistress Davies, and that an attempt to shoot Chaplin may have caused Ince's death. Allegedly, Parsons was also aboard the yacht that night but she ignored the story in her columns. The official cause of death was listed as heart failure.

=== New York Newspaper Women's Club ===
Parsons was a founding member of the New York Newspaper Women's Club, and was elected president of the organization for one term in 1925.

=== Syndication ===
In 1925, Parsons contracted tuberculosis and was told she had six months to live. She spent a year in Palm Springs, California, which led to it being a popular resort for Hollywood movie stars. She moved to Arizona for the dry climate, then to Los Angeles, where she decided to stay. With the disease in remission, she went back to work, and Hearst suggested she become a syndicated Hollywood columnist for his newspapers. As she and the publishing mogul developed an ironclad relationship, her Los Angeles Examiner column came to appear in over seven hundred newspapers the world over, with a readership of more than 20 million, and Parsons gradually became one of the most powerful voices in the movie business with her daily allotment of gossip.

=== Radio program ===
Beginning in 1928, she hosted a weekly radio program featuring movie star interviews that was sponsored by SunKist. A similar program in 1931 was sponsored by Charis Foundation Garment. In 1934, she signed a contract with the Campbell's Soup Company and began hosting a program titled Hollywood Hotel, which showcased stars in scenes from their upcoming movies. The stars appeared for free which did not please rival broadcasters or all of the stars but they did not complain in case of reprisals. Her opening line of the show was "My first exclusive of tonight is...", which became feared. The show was cancelled after the Screen Actors Guild demanded payment for its members. Warner Bros. paid her $50,000 (equal to $1,119,792 today) to appear in a filmed version in 1937, but the film flopped.

=== "First Lady of Hollywood" ===
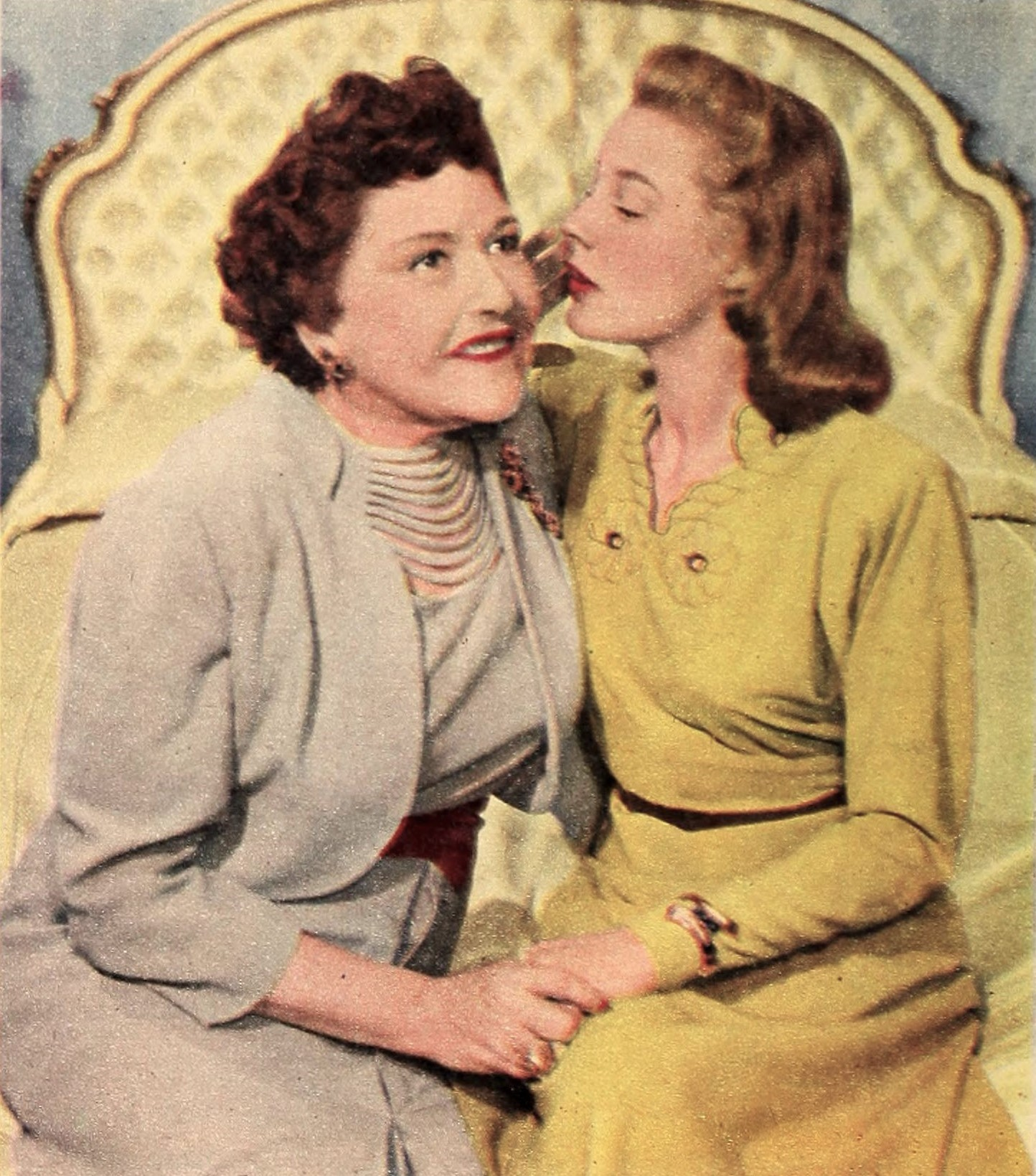
June Allyson reveals a secret to Parsons (1946)

Parsons saw herself as the social and moral arbiter of Hollywood and many feared her disfavor more than that of movie critics.

Parsons had informants in studio corridors, hairdressers' salons, and lawyers' and doctors' offices. Her husband Harry Martin was a urologist and Hollywood physician, and it was thought that he passed on information he learned in his position as a studio doctor. She worked from her Beverly Hills home with a staff consisting of a secretary, her assistant reviewer (Dorothy Manners, who worked with Parsons for thirty years), a "leg" man who gathered news, and a female reporter who covered the cafés. She had three telephones in her office. She also had former silent-movie stars on her payroll to help them financially.

She considered the biggest scoop of her career to be the divorce of Douglas Fairbanks Sr. and Mary Pickford, at that time the most famous couple in Hollywood. Parsons had learned of the split from Pickford herself, who had made the mistake of counting on the columnist's discretion. Parsons sat on the story for six weeks, hoping that they would reconcile and concerned that the news might damage the film industry, but published once she heard that the Los Angeles Times had also gotten the story.

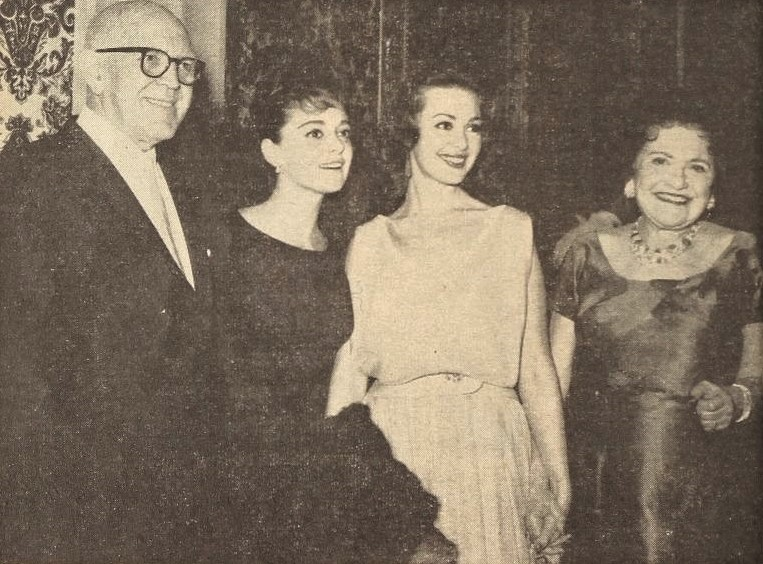
(L-R): Jimmy McHugh, Anna Maria Alberghetti, Barbara Rush and Louella Parsons from Modern Screen, 1960

When she received a tip that Clark Gable was divorcing his second wife Ria, Parsons essentially held Mrs. Gable hostage at her home until she was sure that her story was speeding across the wire ahead of any other service.

Her unofficial title 'Queen of Hollywood' was challenged in 1938 by newcomer Hedda Hopper, to whom she was initially friendly and helpful. However, they came to be fierce rivals.

Parsons also appeared in many cameo spots in movies, including Without Reservations (1946), and Starlift (1951).

=== Writing style ===
In contrast to her arch-rival Hedda Hopper, who was notorious for her column's crass tone, Parsons' writing style was often described as "sweetness and light" or "gooey". She received criticism for her casual chatty tone and casual regard for dates and places. She countered that "the best gossip" is informal and that the speed at which she needed to complete her daily column did not allow for much rewriting or polishing. She stated that she would rather get the word out than potentially disappoint her readers.

She became known in Hollywood for assuming an air of goofy vagueness in order to snap up material without people suspecting she was listening or otherwise letting their guard down.

=== Feud with Hedda Hopper ===
When Hedda Hopper initially came to Hollywood, she and Parsons had a mutually beneficial arrangement. Hopper was then a moderately successful actress, and according to Parson's successor, Dorothy Manners, "if anything happened on a set—if a star and leading man were having an affair—Hedda would give Louella a call." In return, Hopper was guaranteed a few lines of copy under Parsons's increasingly influential byline.

After MGM canceled her contract, Hopper struggled to maintain her career as an actress. She was offered a position as a Hollywood columnist by the Esquire Feature Syndicate due to a recommendation by Andy Hervey of MGM's publicity department.

One of the first papers to pick up "Hedda Hopper's Hollywood" was the Los Angeles Times, a morning paper like Parsons's Examiner. Hopper first publicly scooped Parsons with the divorce of the president's son Jimmy Roosevelt (a Goldwyn employee), who was involved with a Mayo Clinic nurse, from his wife, Betsey. The story became front-page news across the country.

==== Citizen Kane ====
When rumors began to surface that Orson Welles debut film Citizen Kane was inspired by Hearst's life, Parsons lunched with the director and believed his evasions and denials. Hopper arrived uninvited to an early screening of the film and wrote a scathing critique, calling it a "vicious and irresponsible attack on a great man". As a result, Hearst sent Parsons a letter complaining that he had learned about Citizen Kane from Hopper and not her.

On the warpath, Parsons then demanded a private screening of the film and threatened RKO chief George J. Schaefer on Hearst's behalf, first with a lawsuit and then with a vague but powerful threat of consequences for everyone in Hollywood. On January 10, Parsons and two lawyers working for Hearst were given a private screening of the film. Horrified by what she saw, Parsons rushed out of the studio screening room to cable Hearst, who telegraphed back the terse message "Stop Citizen Kane". Soon after, Parsons called Schaefer and threatened RKO with a lawsuit if they released Kane. She also warned other studio heads that she would expose the private lives of people throughout the industry and reveal long-suppressed scandalous information.

When Schaefer—who had also been threatened by Hearst with legal action—announced that Citizen Kane was scheduled to premiere in February 1941 at Radio City Music Hall, Parsons contacted the manager of Radio City Music Hall and advised him that exhibiting the film would result in a press blackout. The premiere was canceled. Other exhibitors were fearful of being sued by Hearst and refused to show the film. As a result, despite support from Hearst adversaries as Henry Luce, on release overall the film lost money. Parsons was by no means alone in her campaign against Citizen Kane but Welles never quite recovered his position in Hollywood afterward.

==== Ingrid Bergman ====
In the early 1950s, the Los Angeles Examiner ran on its front page, above Parsons's byline: "Ingrid Bergman Baby Due in Three Months at Rome". Bergman had left her husband, neurologist Peter Lindström, to live in Italy with director Roberto Rossellini but the news that she might be pregnant was met with some skepticism. Bergman was well known for the angelic role of Sister Benedict in The Bells of St. Mary's.

Hopper, who had been a public supporter of Bergman, had believed the actress' denial of the pregnancy, and printed a fervent repudiation of the rumor. However, Bergman was indeed pregnant and Hopper, enraged at being scooped, launched a PR campaign decrying Bergman for being pregnant out of wedlock and carrying a married man's child. Parsons had allegedly received the tip from Howard Hughes who was incensed at Bergman for being unable to shoot a film for him as promised.

==== Reaction ====
Reportedly, whereas Hopper was more inclined to see their much-publicized antagonism as funny and good for business, Parsons took it personally and saw Hopper as a rival in every possible way. Hopper also referred to Parsons' husband, Harry "Doc" Martin, as "that goddamn clap doctor", which infuriated Parsons.

It has been suggested that Hopper was set up as a columnist by Louis B. Mayer (with the blessing of other studio chiefs) to offset Parsons's monopolistic power. Gossip columnist Liz Smith, stated that: "The studios created both of them. And they thought they could control both of them. But they became Frankenstein monsters escaped from the labs." Hopper and Parsons had a combined readership of 75 million in a country of 160 million.

=== Decline ===
After the death of Hearst in 1951 and with the rise of stars becoming producers, Parsons's influence diminished. She began to show signs of physical deterioration and when the Los Angeles Examiner folded in 1962 her column was switched to the Hearst afternoon paper, the Los Angeles Herald-Express. This meant she lost an edge to Hopper's appearances in the morning Los Angeles Times.

She continued her column until December 1965 when it was taken over by her assistant, Dorothy Manners, who had already been writing the column for more than a year.

== Memoirs ==
Parsons' memoir The Gay Illiterate (1944), published by Doubleday, Doran and Company, became a bestseller. It was followed by a second volume in 1961, Tell It to Louella, published by G.P. Putnam's Sons.

In her personal histories, she expunged significant bits of her history in order to align her life with the Catholicism she began to practice in middle age. She alleged that her first husband died on a transport ship on the way home from World War I, leaving her a widow instead of a divorced single mother. Her second marriage to Jack McCaffrey and eventual divorce is omitted.

== Personal life ==
Parsons was married three times. First, to real estate developer and broker John Dement Parsons, whom she married in 1905. From this union, they had one daughter named Harriet who was born on August 23, 1906, in Burlington City, Des Moines County, Iowa. Parsons divorced John in 1914. A year later, she married second husband John McCaffrey Jr. in 1915. She learned to juggle so she could entertain her wedding guests. The couple later divorced.

She pursued singing as a hobby, and took voice lessons with Estelle Liebling, the voice teacher of Beverly Sills.

Her third marriage was to Los Angeles surgeon Dr. Harry Martin (whom she called "Docky") in 1930; Martin served in the Army Medical Corps during World War I and World War II. His specialty was venereal diseases and he advanced to the post of Twentieth Century Fox's chief medical officer. He was also known as a heavy drinker. They remained married until Martin's death on June 24, 1951.

After Martin's death she dated songwriter Jimmy McHugh, a fellow Catholic who introduced her to many of the new teenage musical sensations of the time, including Elvis Presley. The couple were a fixture at parties, premieres, and such nightspots as Dino's Lodge on Sunset Strip.

Harriet would later follow her mother's passion for writing, and would find employment as a writer for a popular California magazine. She also became one of the few female producers in the Hollywood studio system although she still struggled in this role despite the influence of her powerful mother.

== Death ==
After her retirement, Parsons lived in a nursing home where she died of arteriosclerosis on December 9, 1972, at the age of 91. Her funeral mass was attended by individuals from the movie industry with whom she had maintained genuine friendships. A convert to Roman Catholicism, she was interred in the Holy Cross Cemetery in Culver City, California.

Parsons has two stars on the Hollywood Walk of Fame in Hollywood, one for motion pictures at 6418 Hollywood Boulevard and one for radio at 6300 Hollywood Boulevard.

== In popular culture ==
- Parsons was caricatured in Frank Tashlin's cartoon The Woods Are Full of Cuckoos (1937) as "Louella Possums".
- The character of gossip columnist Dora Bailey in Singin' in the Rain (1952) is based on Parsons.
- On March 8, 1956, Parsons' life was presented in an episode of the television anthology series Climax! Teresa Wright portrayed Parsons in the program.
- Darrell Larson portrayed a spy working for Parsons in the 1982 biodrama Frances—a sneaky reporter who discredits the rebellious actress Frances Farmer, who, refusing to return to Hollywood, has become a leftist political activist in New York City and has a lawyer to file a lawsuit to end her motion picture contract obligations.
- Elizabeth Taylor portrayed Parsons in the TV film Malice in Wonderland (1985) opposite Jane Alexander as Hedda Hopper.
- Brenda Blethyn portrayed Parsons in RKO 281 aka Citizen Welles, a 2000 motion picture about the making of Citizen Kane and the relation between Orson Welles, William Randolph Hearst and Marion Davies.
- Jennifer Tilly portrayed Parsons in Peter Bogdanovich's feature film The Cat's Meow (2001) which was inspired by the mysterious death of young film mogul Thomas H. Ince aboard William Randolph Hearst's yacht in 1924, with Charles Chaplin and Marion Davies also on board. The film depicts a long-rumored version of the story in which Hearst mistakenly shoots Ince because he momentarily confused him with Chaplin, who was having an affair with Davies at the time, and Parsons was rewarded with a lifetime column in Hearst's newspapers for keeping quiet about it.
- Natalie Pinot portrayed Parsons in the monologue Louella Persons (2013) written by Secun de la Rosa and directed by Benjamin de la Rosa.
- Tilda Swinton portrayed both Thora Thacker and Thessaly Thacker, mimicking the rivalry between Louella Parsons and Hedda Hopper, in "Hail, Caesar!" (2016).
- Joanna Sanchez portrayed Parsons in Frank & Ava (2018).

== Audio recording ==
- Louella Parsons at 1958 Masquers Club testimonial dinner for Judy Garland
