= Martin Vidnovic =

American actor-singer

Martin Vidnovic (born January 4, 1948) is an American actor and singer.

== Biography ==
He is of Serbian descent. Born in Falls Church, Virginia, Vidnovic graduated from the College-Conservatory of Music (part of the University of Cincinnati) with a Bachelor of Fine Arts.

Vidnovic made his Broadway debut in the ill-fated Home Sweet Homer (1976) which, following a one-year tour, closed on opening night. He fared better with his next three projects, revivals of The King and I (1977) as Lun Tha, Oklahoma! (1979) as Jud Fry, and Brigadoon (1980) as Tommy Albright. Vidnovic's performance in Baby (1983) won him the Drama Desk Award for Outstanding Featured Actor in a Musical. Additional Broadway credits include A Grand Night for Singing (1993), and Saul in King David (1997).

He was a replacement in the lead role of Sky Masterson in the second Broadway revival of Guys and Dolls.

He was cast in the 1998 stage adaptation of Footloose but was replaced during previews.

Off-Broadway, Vidnovic was cast as El Gallo late in the run of the original production of The Fantasticks and appeared in the 2006 revival as Bellomy. Additional off-Broadway credits include Lies and Legends: The Musical Stories of Harry Chapin (1985), Olympus on My Mind (1986), and the 2003 Jerry Herman revue Showtune. He played Max von Mayerling in the 2011 Pioneer Theatre Company production of Sunset Boulevard.

Most recently in 2011 and 2012, he played the principal role of Mal Beineke and understudied the starring role of Gomez in the first US national tour of The Addams Family.

== Family ==
Vidnovic was briefly married in the late 1970s to voice teacher Linda Wonneberger, with whom he has a daughter, the actress Laura Benanti.

Vidnovic is also the uncle of former Minor Threat bassist Steve Hansgen.

== Additional nominations ==
- 1981 Tony Award for Best Actor in a Musical (Brigadoon)
- 1981 Drama Desk Award for Outstanding Actor in a Musical (Brigadoon)
- 1980 Drama Desk Award for Outstanding Featured Actor in a Musical (Oklahoma!)
