= Tri-State Concert Series =

Maryland concert series

The Tri-State Community Concert Association organizes concerts throughout the year in the greater Cumberland, Maryland region. The concert venue is a tribute to music from the golden age of rock-n-roll, swing, and big-band; as well as popular country and choral music.

Previous performances have included:

- 09/2002 – The Platters
- 10/2002 – Jimmy Dorsey & The Pied Pipers
- 10/2002 – Harry James
- 11/2002 – Mills Brothers
- 12/2002 – Holiday Special
- 03/2003 – Les Brown
- 04/2003 – Gail Bliss – Tribute to Patsy Cline
- 05/2003 – Sammy Kaye
- 06/2003 – The Four Lads
- 09/2004 – The Crystals
- 09/2004 – Martha and the Vandellas
- 10/2004 – Gary Lewis & the Playboys
- 10/2004 – Lou Christie
- 01/2005 – Bobby Vee
- 01/2005 – Diamond David Somerville
- 02/2005 – Beary Hobb's Drifters
- 02/2005 – Cornell Gunter Coasters
- 03/2005 – The Waller Family
- 04/2005 – Matt Lewis
- 04/2005 – A Tribute to Elvis
- 04/2005 – The Jordanaires
- 09/2005 – The Happenings
- 09/2005 – Shirley Alston-Reeves
- 09/2005 – The Del-Vikings
- 10/2005 – Johnny Maestro & the Brooklyn Bridge
- 10/2005 – Chinese Bandits
- ??/2006 – <fill in missing info here>
- 1/2007 – The Lettermen
- 2/2007 – The Wallers
- 3/2007 – Bobby Vinton
- 4/2007 – Bill Haley's Comets ("Rock Around the Clock" fame) / The Del-Vikings
- 9/2007 – Matt Lewis' Tribute to Elvis with the Chinese Bandits
- 10/2007 – Beary Hobbs' Drifters and The Platters
