= Harriet Parsons =

American filmmaker

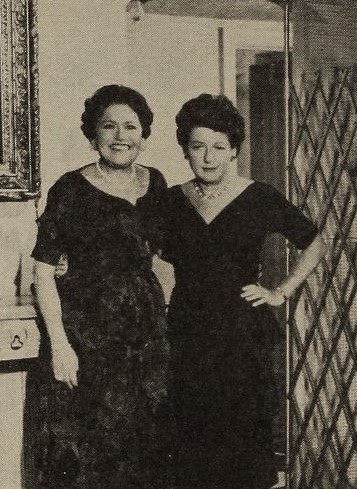
- Louella Parsons and her daughter Harriet Parsons, 1959
- Born: Harriet Oettinger Parsons; August 23, 1906; Burlington, Iowa, US
- Died: January 2, 1983 (aged 76); Santa Monica, California, US
- Education: Wellesley College
- Occupations: Film producer, actress, and director
- Spouse: King Kennedy (m. 1939; div. 1946)
- Children: 1
- Mother: Louella Oettinger

Harriet Oettinger Parsons (August 23, 1906 – January 2, 1983) was an American film producer, actress, director, and magazine writer; one of the few female producers in the United States at the time. Her mother was famed gossip columnist Louella Parsons.

== Biography ==
=== Beginnings ===
Harriet Oettinger Parsons was born in 1906 in Burlington, Iowa, the daughter of Louella Parsons and John Dement Parsons.

She appeared as "Baby Parsons" in several movies, which included The Magic Wand (1912), written by her mother. Harriet attended Wellesley College, graduating in 1928.

=== Writing ===
She began working as writer for Metro-Goldwyn Mayer in 1928 but left after a year to become a columnist and associate editor for Photoplay as well as writing for other magazines such as Liberty. She left to write for Hearst's International News Service and Universal Service in 1931 and worked there until 1933, when she went to work for Columbia Pictures as a producer. She wrote for The Los Angeles Examiner from 1935 through 1943; had a syndicated column for Hearst from 1938–1940 (Hollywood in Review); and had her own weekly radio show on NBC in 1938, Hollywood Highlights.

=== Producer career ===
In 1933, she began working for Columbia Pictures producing their Screen Snapshots documentary shorts and in 1940 she moved to Republic Pictures, directing and producing a series of documentary shorts called Meet the Stars, in which she commented on the goings-on of Hollywood A-listers. She produced her first feature film, Joan of Ozark, in 1942 and was then hired by RKO as a feature film producer in 1943. When Howard Hughes took over, Parsons was one of the only producers he kept on. She worked at RKO for 12 years, although the experience was a frustrating one: The studio often reassigned stories she'd chosen to other producers. She was one of only three female producers active in the United States from 1943 to 1955 (the others being Virginia Van Upp and Joan Harrison), and in 1953 was the sole woman member of the Screen Producer's Guild. Parsons bought a home in the Deep Well neighborhood of Palm Springs, California in 1955. From 1956 to 1957 she worked for 20th Century Fox Television. She also co-produced Benn Levy's play Rape of the Belt on Broadway in November 1960.

=== Personal life ===
In 1931, she and actor Edward Woods announced their engagement; it was broken off by 1932. She married actor and playwright King Kennedy in September 1939; the couple separated in 1944. Parsons sued him for divorce in March 1945, citing cruelty. Parsons' marriage was a classic "cover" for her lesbianism and she and King hardly ever lived together, and by the 1950s she was living with publicist Lynn Bowers.

Parsons adopted a daughter, Evelyn Farney, who became a dancer.

She was a co-founder (with her mother) of the Hollywood Women's Press Club and was a director and member of the entertainment committee member of the Hollywood Canteen during World War II.

=== Death ===
Parsons died in 1983 at the age of 76 after suffering from cancer for two years. She was interred at the Holy Cross Cemetery, Culver City, California.

== Selected filmography ==
- Joan of Ozark (1942)
- The Enchanted Cottage (1945)
- Night Song (1947)
- I Remember Mama (1948)
- Never a Dull Moment (1950)
- Clash by Night (1952)
- Susan Slept Here (1954)
