= Ole Buttermilk Sky =

Single by Kay Kyser and his Orchestra
- B-side: "On The Wrong Side Of You"
- Released: August 26, 1946
- Label: Columbia 37073
- Composers: Hoagy Carmichael
- Lyricists: Jack Brooks

"Ole Buttermilk Sky" is a song written by Hoagy Carmichael which was first a hit in 1946 for big band leader and old-time radio personality Kay Kyser. It has been covered by a multitude of artists / singers over the years and decades since. It was nominated in 1947 for an Academy Award for Best Original Song.

== Background ==
The song was composed by Hoagy Carmichael (1899–1981), and Jack Brooks (1912–1971), and introduced by Carmichael himself in the Western film Canyon Passage (1946), starring Dana Andrews, Brian Donlevy, Susan Hayward, Patricia Roc, Ward Bond and Andy Devine.

== Composition ==
"Ole Buttermilk Sky" was primarily written as a cowboy song to set the scene where the character meets his lover. The song also used jazz music for the lyric "can't you see my little donkey and me".

== Chart performance ==
It was recorded in the December 14 issue of The Billboard magazine that "Ole Buttermilk Sky" by big band / orchestra leader and old-time radio personality Kay Kyser was at #1 in the Best Selling Popular Retail Records section. Having moved up two notches from its previous position of #3, it had been in the chart for the past seven weeks. A later version by Helen Carroll and the Satisfiers (1914–2011), was at #8. Paul Weston (1912–1996) with his billed ensemble of Paul Weston and his Orchestra with Matt Dennis (1914–2002) as vocalist singer, had their versions at #9.

For the week ending December 14, 1946, in the Most Played Juke Box Records chart, it showed that the song was getting many plays and there were five versions getting attention. Kay Kyser's version on Columbia 37073 had been on the chart was at #2. Hoagy Carmichael's version was at #5. Paul Weston and his Orchestra with Matt Dennis were at #9. Helen Carroll and the Satisfiers were at #15. And a new version by female singer Connee Boswell (1907–1976), was coming up the charts.

== Awards and honors ==
"Ole Buttermilk Sky" was nominated for an Academy Award for Best Original Song at the 19th Academy Awards, which took place at the Shrine Auditorium in Los Angeles, California in March 1947. The Oscar that year went to On the Atchison, Topeka and the Santa Fe from The Harvey Girls, with music by Harry Warren and lyrics by Johnny Mercer.
