= Reginald DuValle =

American music educator and jazz musician (1893–1953)

Reginald DuValle (1893–1953) was an American jazz pianist, accordion player, and a bandleader from Indianapolis, Indiana, who taught jazz singer-songwriter Hoagy Carmichael improvisation on the piano.

DuValle was born in Indianapolis, Indiana, in 1893. By 1912 he was playing second piano in the dance orchestra of fellow pianist Russell Smith at Indianapolis's Severin Hotel. Around 1916, when Hoagy Carmichael was a teenager and aspiring musician, DuValle taught him improvisation on the piano. In addition to piano lessons, DuValle gave Carmichael some career advice: "Never play anything that ain't right. You may not make any money, but you'll never get mad at yourself." (According to Carmichael's son, Randy, his father was an incessant composer, who worked on a song for days or even weeks until it was perfect.)

Later, DuValle formed his own band, known as the "Blackbirds." DuValle led the jazz group and played the piano at social events, in ballrooms, and at dance halls around Indianapolis. DuValle and his band also played for dances held at area schools, such as Indiana University in Bloomington, Indiana, and Purdue University in West Lafayette, Indiana.

DuValle lived at 1202 Harlan Street in a predominantly black neighborhood on Indianapolis's south side. DuValle's home was a frequent overnight stop for black musicians at a time when Indianapolis's hotels were racially segregated. DuValle's overnight guests included noted jazz musicians Cab Calloway, Eubie Blake, and Noble Sissle, among others.

On December 26, 1927, DuValle and his musicians performed at the opening of the Madame Walker Theatre on Indiana Avenue, the center of Indianapolis's black community at that time. The "Blackbirds" became the theatre's resident orchestra. Billed as "the Rhythm King", DuValle also hosted a weekly, fifteen-minute broadcast radio station WFBM (also known as WKBF).

After 1929, when the music business declined during the Great Depression, DuValle remained active in music as a bandleader in the evenings, but worked a day job at Linco Gas Company. Later, he played the accordion while performing in the "Lincoln Safety Train" promotional tour for the Ohio Gas Company. DuValle never recorded music commercially. He died in 1953.

DuValle's son, Reginald Jr., who became a jazz trombonist, described his father as "way ahead of his time, especially with his chords – though his 'feel' was still ragtime." Fellow Indiana bandleader Charlie Davis called DuValle "the elder statesman of Indiana jazz."
