= I Was a Communist for the FBI =

- Theatrical release poster
- Directed by: Gordon Douglas
- Screenplay by: Crane Wilbur
- Based on: the SEP articles "I Posed as a Communist for the F.B.I." by: Matt Cvetic; Pete Martin
- Produced by: Bryan Foy
- Starring: Frank Lovejoy
- Narrated by: Frank Lovejoy
- Cinematography: Edwin B. DuPar
- Edited by: Folmar Blangsted
- Music by: William Lava; Max Steiner (uncredited)
- Color process: Black and white
- Production company: Warner Bros. Pictures
- Distributed by: Warner Bros. Pictures
- Release dates: May 2, 1951 (New York City); May 5, 1951 (United States)
- Running time: 83 minutes
- Country: United States
- Language: English
- Budget: $684,000
- Box office: $1,759,000 (total); $1.3 million (US rentals)

I Was a Communist for the FBI is a 1951 American film noir.

It stars Frank Lovejoy as Matt Cvetic, who infiltrated a local Communist Party cell for nine years and reported to the Federal Bureau of Investigation on the group's activities.

The film is based on a series of stories written by Cvetic that appeared in The Saturday Evening Post.

== Plot ==
Matt Cvetic, who works in a Pittsburgh steel mill, has been infiltrating the Communist Party for the FBI in Pittsburgh for nine years. During this time, he has been unable to tell his family about his dual role, so they assume that he is a genuine believer in communism and despise him for it.

Cvetic becomes emotionally involved with a communist schoolteacher who is becoming disenchanted with the party. She leaves the party when it foments a violent strike. Cvetic helps her escape the communists in violent episodes in which two communists and an FBI agent are killed.

Cvetic testifies against the Communists before the House Un-American Activities Committee and reconciles with his brother and son.

== Cast ==
- Frank Lovejoy as Matt Cvetic
- Dorothy Hart as Eve Merrick
- Philip Carey as Mason
- James Millican as Jim Blandon
- Richard Webb as Ken Crowley
- Konstantin Shayne as Gerhardt Eisler
- Paul Picerni as Joe Cvetic
- Roy Roberts as Father Novac
- Edward Norris as Harmon (as Eddie Norris)
- Ron Hagerthy as Dick Cvetic
- Hugh Sanders as Clyde Garson
- Hope Kramer as Ruth Cvetic
- Lyle Latell as FBI Officer Cahill
- Russ Conway as Frank Cvetic
- Frank Gerstle as Tom Cvetic

== Production ==
The film was succeeded by a radio series also titled I Was a Communist for the FBI, starring Dana Andrews, that consisted of 78 episodes and aired on more than 600 stations in the United States from March 30, 1952, to September 20, 1953. The radio program was made without the cooperation of the FBI, reflecting public fear of the Communist Party during the Red Scare.

== Reception ==
In a contemporary review for The New York Times, critic Bosley Crowther wrote: "[T]he writing, the acting and the direction of this film are in a taut style of 'thriller' fiction that the perceptive will recognize. .... Frank Lovejoy, who muscularly plays the title role, is a model of tight and efficient resolution, ingenuity and spunk."

Variety wrote: "[S]cripter Crane Wilbur has fashioned an exciting film. Direction of Gordon Douglas plays up suspense and pace strongly, and the cast, headed by Frank Lovejoy in the title role, punches over the expose of the Communist menace."

According to Warner Bros. records, the film earned $1,319,000 in the U.S. and $440,000 elsewhere.

== Awards ==
The film was nominated for an Academy Award as the Best Documentary Feature of the year.
