= Darwin Teilhet =

American novelist and writer (1904–1964)

- Born: Darwin LeOra Teilhet; May 20, 1904; Wyanet, Illinois, United States
- Died: April 18, 1964 (aged 59); Palo Alto, California, US
- Other names: Darwin L. Teilhet, Darwin and Hildegarde Teilhet, Cyrus Fisher, William H Fielding, Theo Durant
- Occupations: Mystery novelist; advertising executive; journalist; film screenwriter; consultant
- Known for: Baron von Kaz, a Viennese detective protagonist

Darwin LeOra Teilhet (May 20, 1904 – April 18, 1964) was an American mystery novelist, advertising executive, journalist and a film screenwriter and consultant.

== Biography ==
Teilhet was born in Wyanet, Illinois, to a Dutch mother, and a father of French descent. As a teenager, he traveled in France and worked as a juggler in a circus there. He wrote a monthly column on broadcast radio for Forum magazine from 1932 to 1934 whilst he headed the broadcast radio advertisement unit of N. W. Ayer & Son. Teilhet was an officer in the Office of Strategic Services serving first in making propaganda in Washington D.C. before being transferred to London and attaining the rank of major. He was scheduled to perform intelligence operations during Operation Overlord, yet was sent home to America after contracting pneumonia. He later became executive assistant to the president of Dole Pineapple in Hawaii.

Teilhet taught journalism classes at Stanford University, and worked as a screenwriter and consultant for various film producers.

Teilhet created his main detective protagonist, Baron von Kaz, a Viennese, at the instigation of James Poling of Doubleday Books. He wrote some of his mystery novels with his wife, Hildegarde Tolman Teilhet (November 22, 1905 – January 24, 1999). Novels were published by Darwin Teilhet, Darwin L. Teilhet, Darwin and Hildegarde Teilhet or his pseudonyms, Cyrus Fisher (juvenile fiction), William H Fielding and Theo Durant. Teilhet was a Newbery Honor award winner for his Cyrus Fisher novel, The Avion My Uncle Flew.

Teilhet chose the pseudonym "Cyrus Fisher" as a tribute to his late father-in-law, Cyrus Fisher Tolman (1873–1942), professor emeritus of Economic Geology at Stanford University, as well as a tribute to his son Cyrus Jr. who died suddenly at the age of three months. There is a "Cyrus Fisher Tolman Professor in the School of Earth Sciences" professorship named in his honor, at the Woods Institute for the Environment, Stanford University.

Teilhet died in Palo Alto, California. He and his wife are buried together in Golden Gate National Cemetery.

== Novels ==
- Murder in the Air (1931)
- Death Flies High (1931)
- The Talking Sparrow Murders (1934)
- Bright Destination (1935)
- The Ticking Terror Murders (1935)
- The Feather Cloak Murders (1936) with Hildegarde Teilhet
- The Crimson Hair Murders (1936) with Hildegarde Teilhet
- Journey to the West (1938)
- The Broken Face Murders (1940) with Hildegarde Teilhet
- Trouble Is My Master (1942)
- Retreat From the Dolphin (1943)
- Odd Man Pays (1944)
- My True Love (1945)
- The Fear Makers (1945)
- The Avion My Uncle Flew (1946) as Cyrus Fisher
- Something Wonderful to Happen (1947)
- Ab Carmody's Treasure: Mystery and Adventure in Guatemala (1948) as Cyrus T. Fisher
- The Happy Island (1950)
- The Mission of Jeffery Tolamy (1951)
- The Unpossessed (1951) as William H Fielding
- Steamboat on the River (1952)
- Take Me As I Am (1952) as William H Fielding
- Beautiful Humbug (1954) as William H Fielding
- The Lion's Skin (1955)
- The Road to Glory (1956)
- The Hawaiian Sword (1956) as Cyrus T. Fisher
- The Big Runaround (1964) aka Dangerous Encounter

== Selected filmography (writer) ==
- They Wanted to Marry (1937), from a short story
- No Room for the Groom (1952), from his novel, "My True Love"
- The Fearmakers (1958), from his novel, "The Fear Makers"
