= Matt Cvetic =

Slovenian-American anti-communist FBI informant (1909–1962)

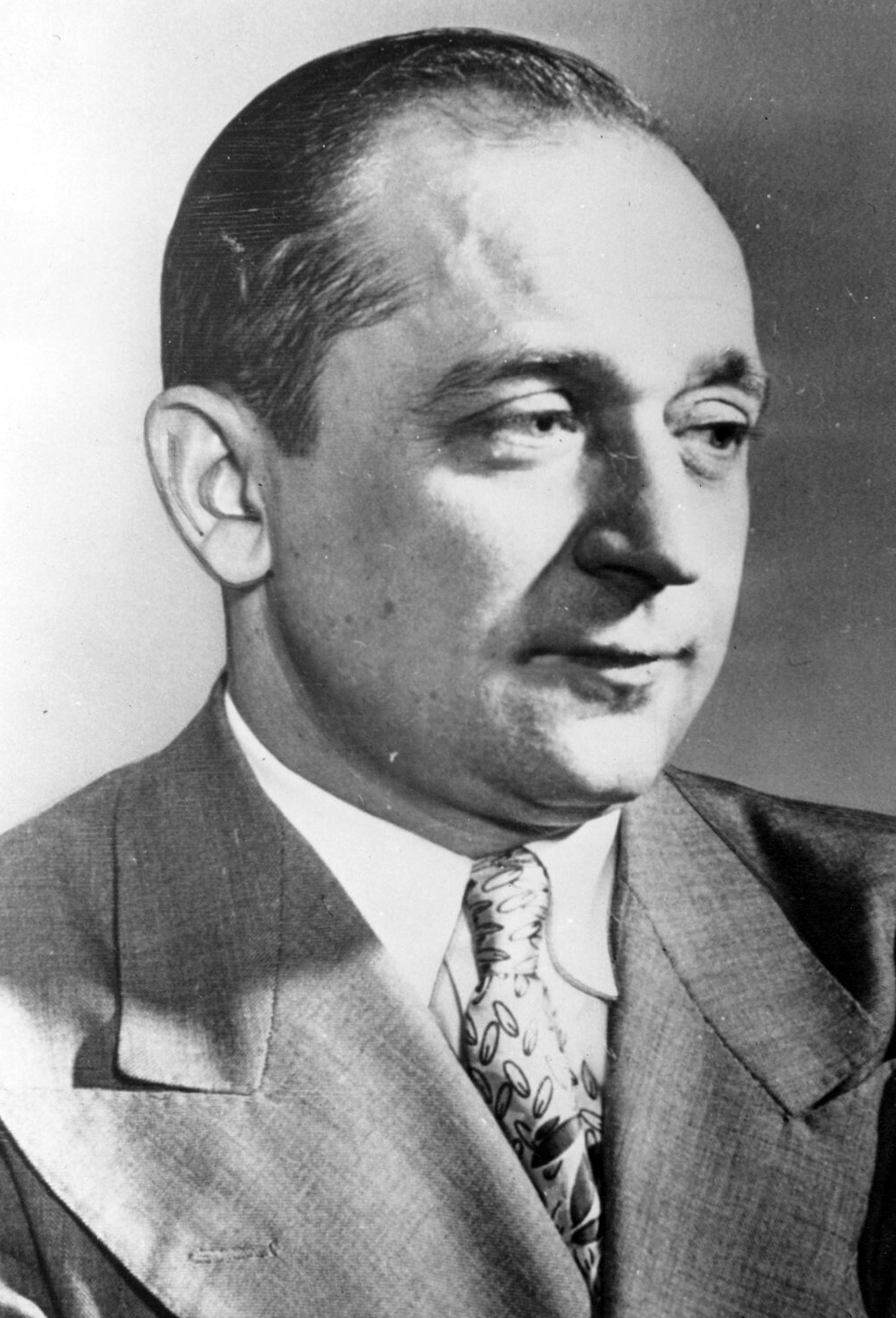
- Cvetic in 1954
- Born: March 4, 1909; Pittsburgh, Pennsylvania, U.S.
- Died: July 26, 1962 (aged 53); Los Angeles, California, U.S.
- Occupation: FBI Counterspy
- Years active: 1941–1950
- Known for: I Was a Communist for the FBI, anti-communist activities
- Children: 2

Matthew Cvetic (March 4, 1909 – July 26, 1962) was a Pittsburgh native who was a spy and informant working for the Federal Bureau of Investigation (FBI) inside the Communist Party of the United States (CPUSA) during the 1940s. He told his story in a series published in The Saturday Evening Post, and his experiences were then fictionalized in the old time radio show I Was a Communist for the FBI, adapted for a Warner Brothers motion picture in 1951. He testified before the House Un-American Activities Committee in the 1950s.

== Life ==
Cvetic was born in 1909 to Slovenian immigrants living in Pittsburgh. One of 11 children, Cvetic graduated from St. Mary's Roman Catholic Grammar School in 1922. Thereafter, his formal education is difficult to verify, in part due to the often-contradictory testimony he provided before various audiences over the course of his career. At various points he claimed to have attended "prep school or college," although during a hostile cross examination in 1954 was forced to admit that he had only completed the tenth grade. Before his employment with the Federal Bureau of Investigation, Cvetic worked a series of jobs, including various sales positions as well as briefly serving at the Pennsylvania State Department of Labor and Industry. On August 15, 1931, he married a pregnant Marie Barsh, who gave birth to twin sons the next year. The marriage proved to be a tumultuous one, as Barsh claimed that he was physically and verbally abusive with her as well as unfaithful, leading to a separation followed by a divorce in January, 1946. This period was especially difficult for Cvetic as he was arrested in 1939 after allegedly having beaten his sister-in-law badly enough that she required hospitalization. During World War II, he volunteered to join the United States Army but was rejected for being too short.

In April 1942, Cvetic came to the attention of the FBI which offered him the opportunity to penetrate the American Communist Party as part of their broader anti-communist efforts. Cvetic quickly agreed, and by the end of 1942, was considered suitable material for membership in the Pittsburgh branch CPUSA, his membership being granted to him in February, 1943. Shortly after his joining the party, Cvetic was offered weekly compensation in the amount of $15, which was increased to $35 per week in late 1943, then $65 by 1947. By 1948 he was earning $85 per week for his work, and although he continually pressured the Bureau to increase his salary to $100 and threatened to quit if his requests were not granted, FBI Director J. Edgar Hoover rebuffed his requests.

Despite the valuable information provided to the FBI by Cvetic, his increasingly erratic behavior began to undermine his credibility with both the Bureau as well as the CPUSA. As early as 1946, Cvetic had been identified as a potential FBI mole by Hearst reporter James Moore. In 1947, Cvetic was arrested for drunk and disorderly conduct and while in the Pittsburgh city jail allegedly shouted "you can't do this to me, I work for the FBI!" In addition, Cvetic had difficulty maintaining his cover and, by his own admission, had admitted to several people that he worked for the FBI, including his brother, his psychiatrist, and "more than one girl." By 1947, the FBI was considering discontinuing the use of Cvetic as an informant due to his security breaches, but ultimately decided to continue employing him.

The depth to which Cvetic penetrated the CPUSA remains unclear. Although subsequent film and radio adaptations portrayed Cvetic as one of the party's primary operatives in the United States, Cvetic did not appear to have risen above the party's lower echelons. At a HUAC report on the American Slav Congress in 1949, Cvetic was listed as "a Slovenian Communist Party member." He was trusted enough by the party to be allowed access to numerous party documents and files, but by his own admission, by the end of his career Cvetic was employed by the CPUSA, "doing odd jobs."

In February 1950, Cvetic surfaced for the first time and was summoned to testify before HUAC. During this testimony he was accompanied by several Communist Party members from Pittsburgh who he had been working with, and they did not find out he was an undercover FBI agent until he began testifying against them, despite having accompanied him to the hearing. During his testimony in February 1950 and in subsequent sessions throughout the rest of the year, Cvetic named several hundred people as members of the CPUSA, and provided information regarding the internal workings of the Pittsburgh branch of CPUSA as well as various allegedly communist-controlled organizations. However, while Cvetic was considered a reliable witness when testifying in front of friendly audiences, hostile cross-examinations often left him at a loss for words, unable to remember key details and often refusing to answer questions on the grounds that he did not wish to give away FBI secrets to the communists. While testifying at the trials of CPUSA leader Steve Nelson for sedition in 1951 and 1952, Cvetic was questioned on the stand by Nelson who, acting as his own counsel, repeatedly referred to Cvetic as "a fingerman" and "professional patriot." Cvetic continued to appear at various government hearings until 1955.

== I Was a Communist for the FBI ==
On July 14, 1950, Cvetic was featured in the television series We the People, a half-hour program hosted by Dan Seymour detailing his alleged activities while operating as an FBI informant. Concurrently, on July 15, 22, and 29, 1950, Cvetic published his story in serial format in the Saturday Evening Post, written by Pete Martin. These stories sparked the public's interest in Cvetic, resulting in the production of the radio series and feature film.

=== Radio serial ===
In 1952, the Frederick W. Ziv Company presented I was a Communist for the FBI as a radio serial. The series had Dana Andrews as the voice of Cvetic and also had a $12,000 budget which was a significant amount for a radio show. The show had the tagline "I'm a communist for the FBI, I walk alone.". It ran for 72 episodes between 1952 and 1954.

In the series, Cvetic is an undercover agent of the FBI who infiltrates many Communist spy rings within the United States. Cvetic poses as a faithful party member to gain information on Communist plots designed to destroy the U.S. Except for his superiors in the FBI and a local priest, no one, not even members of Cvetic's family, knows that he is merely posing as a Communist.

=== Movie ===
Warner Bros. purchased the rights to the Post story and released I Was a Communist for the FBI on May 5, 1951. Although the story was fictionalized, the movie was nominated for an Academy Award for Best Documentary in 1952. A notable feature of the movie is Cvetic's report of anti-black attitudes among many of the Party leadership. One character, closely modeled on Party leader Steve Nelson remarks with contempt after a rally aimed at blacks "boy, those niggers really ate it up, didn't they?"

=== Writing ===
In November 1959 the first editions of "The Big Decision" were published. This was Cvetic's personal account of his actions as a counterspy, many of the names in the story were changed to protect identities.

== Later life ==
With the waning of anti-communism in the 1950s, Cvetic struggled to find buyers who were interested in his story as well as his testimony. As early as 1953, attorneys had declined to utilize him as a witness due to recurring concerns regarding the quality of his testimony. By 1955, Cvetic had been largely discredited as a witness. On April 21, 1955, the Justice Department's Committee on Security Witnesses unanimously recommended that Cvetic not be used as a witness unless his testimony could be corroborated by external sources. This coincided with continued FBI concerns regarding Cvetic's embellishment of the facts, including one instance in which he claimed to have defused a Nazi spy plot single-handedly.

In the hopes of capitalizing on his fame to achieve political goals, Cvetic ran in the Republican primary for Pennsylvania's 28th district in May, 1954, but failed to win the nomination.

In February, 1955, a depressed Cvetic was admitted to St. Francis Hospital in Pittsburgh by his son for a psychiatric evaluation following several days of heavy drinking. Cvetic was readmitted a short time later and received electroconvulsive therapy in March 1955, after which he was released. Shortly thereafter on March 16, the INS stated that it was no longer using Cvetic as a witness in deportation hearings. Throughout the late 1950s, Cvetic attempted to rekindle interest in his usefulness as an anti-communist expert witness, and supplemented his income by engaging in speaking tours throughout the United States. In 1960, Cvetic became involved with the John Birch Society as well as the Christian Crusade, a strongly anti-communist organization led by Reverend Billy James Hargis.

On July 26, 1962, Cvetic suffered a heart attack and died at age 53 while waiting to take a driver's license exam in Los Angeles, California.

== Works ==
- The Big Decision: Based on the Experiences of Matt Cvetic Former FBI Counterspy. Hollywood, CA: Matt Cvetic, 1960.
- Conspiracy! An Expose of Soviet Agents in America: The Sworn Testimony of Matt Cvetic, Former Counterspy of the FBI. Hollywood, CA: The Big Decision, n.d. (c. 1960).
