= Hoagy Carmichael =

American composer, pianist, singer, actor and bandleader (1899–1981)

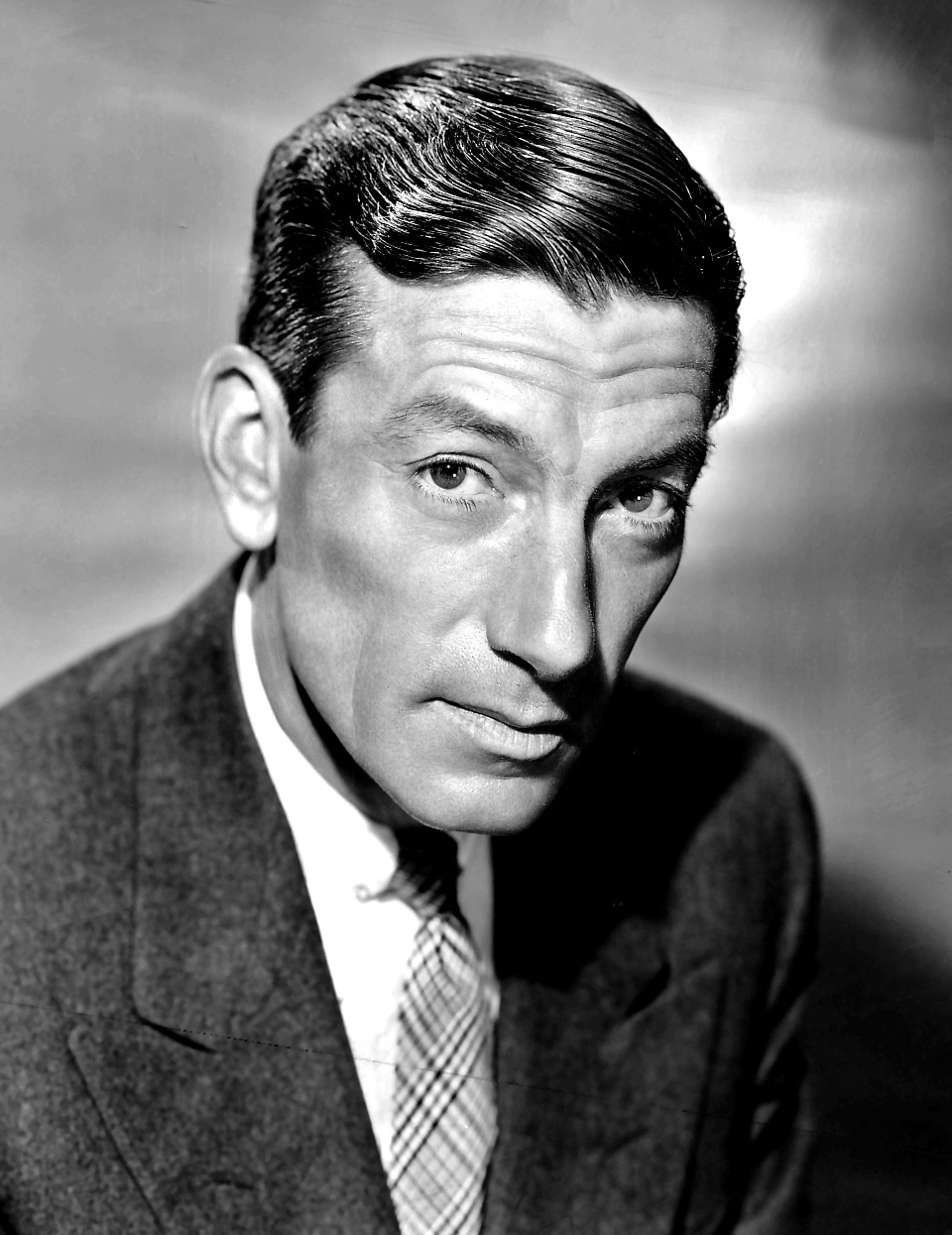
- Carmichael in 1947
- Born: Hoagland Howard Carmichael; November 22, 1899; Bloomington, Indiana, U.S.
- Died: December 27, 1981 (aged 82); Rancho Mirage, California, U.S.
- Education: Indiana University Bloomington (BA, LLB)
- Occupations: Musician; composer; songwriter; actor; lawyer
- Years active: 1918–1981
- Political party: Republican
- Spouses: Ruth Meinardi (m. 1936; div. 1955); Wanda McKay (m. 1977)
- Children: 2
- Musical career
- Genres: Musical films, popular songs, country-western music
- Instruments: Piano; vocals
- Website: hoagy.com

Hoagland Howard Carmichael (November 22, 1899 – December 27, 1981) was an American musician, composer, songwriter, actor, author and lawyer. Carmichael was one of the most successful Tin Pan Alley songwriters of the 1930s and 1940s, and was among the first singer-songwriters in the age of mass media to use new communication technologies such as radio broadcasts, television, microphones, and sound recordings (musical records).

Carmichael composed several hundred songs, including 50 that achieved hit record status. He is best known for composing four of the most-recorded American songs of all time: "Stardust" (1927), with lyrics by Mitchell Parish, "Georgia on My Mind" (1930), with lyrics by Stuart Gorrell, "The Nearness of You" (1937), with lyrics by Ned Washington, and "Heart and Soul" (1938), with lyrics by Frank Loesser.

He also collaborated with lyricist-songwriter Johnny Mercer (1909–1976), on "Lazybones" (1933), and later "Skylark" (1941). Carmichael's "Ole Buttermilk Sky" of 1946, was an Academy Award nominee for an Oscar in the following year of March 1947, with the eponymous theme song from the Western film Canyon Passage (1946), starring Dana Andrews, Brian Donlevy, Susan Hayward and Ward Bond, in which he co-starred as a ukulele and guitar-playing balladeer musician and prospector-miner riding a mule.

Four years later, "In the Cool, Cool, Cool of the Evening", with lyrics by Johnny Mercer, won the Academy Award for Best Original Song in 1951. Carmichael also appeared as a character actor and musical performer in 14 other films, hosted three musical-variety radio programs, performed on television, and wrote two autobiographies or memoirs.

== Early life and education ==
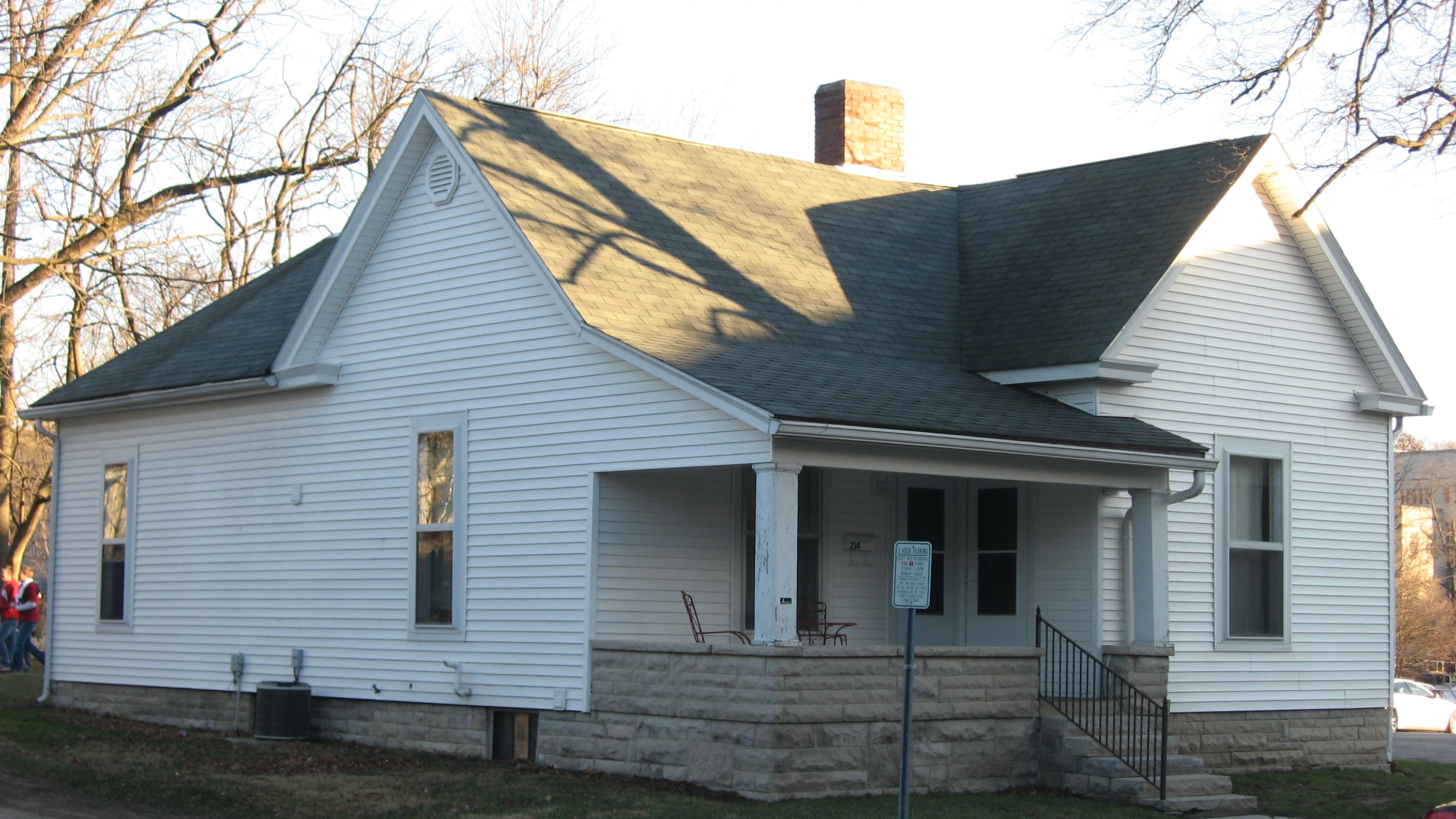
Carmichael's family house on North Dunn Street in Bloomington, Indiana (pictured in 2011).

Hoagland Howard ("Hoagy") Carmichael was born on November 22, 1899, in Bloomington, Indiana. He was the first child and only son of Howard Clyde and Lida Mary (Robison) Carmichael. His parents named him after a circus troupe called the "Hoaglands," who had stayed at the Carmichael house during his mother's pregnancy. Howard worked as a horse-drawn taxi driver and later as an electrician, while Lida, a versatile pianist, provided musical accompaniment at nickelodeons and silent movie theaters, and private parties to supplement the family's income. Hoagy had two younger sisters, Georgia and Joanne.

Due to Howard's unstable job history, the family moved frequently. Hoagy spent most of his early years in Bloomington, which served as the county seat of Monroe County and was also a college town, home to the main campus of Indiana University, as well as being near the state capital, Indianapolis. In 1910, when Hoagy was about 11 years old, the family relocated to Missoula, Montana.

Carmichael's mother taught him to sing and play the piano at an early age. Aside from a few piano lessons with Reginald DuValle—an Indianapolis bandleader and accordionist known as "the elder statesman of Indiana jazz"—Carmichael received no formal musical training. He was largely self-taught as a pianist and entirely self-taught as a composer. The Carmichael family returned to Indianapolis in 1916, where Hoagy attended Emmerich Manual High School; however, at the age of 16, he dropped out to help support the family. Three years later, in 1919, Hoagy and his family moved back to Bloomington, where he graduated from Bloomington High School.

For musical inspiration, Carmichael listened to prominent ragtime pianists Hank Wells and Hube Hanna. At 18, to help support his family's meager income, he held various manual jobs in building construction, a bicycle chain factory, and a slaughterhouse. This difficult period was somewhat alleviated by playing piano duets with his mother and through his long friendship with DuValle, who introduced him to piano-jazz improvisation. Carmichael's professional music career began in 1918 when he earned $5 playing at a college fraternity dance at Indiana University.

The death of Carmichael's three-year-old sister in 1918, likely due to the Spanish flu pandemic, deeply affected him. He later reflected, "My sister Joanne—the victim of poverty. We couldn't afford a good doctor or good attention, and that's when I vowed I would never be broke again in my lifetime."

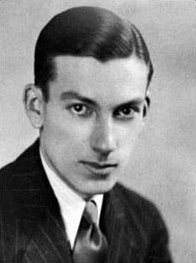
Carmichael pictured while attending Indiana University

After graduating from high school, Carmichael attended Indiana University in Bloomington, where he earned a Bachelor of Arts degree in 1925. He was a member of the Kappa Sigma fraternity and played piano around Indiana and Ohio with his band, "Carmichael's Collegians."

Around 1922, Carmichael met Leon "Bix" Beiderbecke, a cornetist and occasional pianist from Iowa. They became friends and played music together. In 1923, during a visit to Chicago, Beiderbecke introduced Carmichael to fellow musician Louis Armstrong, with whom Carmichael would later collaborate. Armstrong was playing in King Oliver's Creole Jazz Band at the time. Armstrong continued to influence Carmichael's compositions; he mentioned in a letter to his wife in the early 1930s that he planned to meet Armstrong to learn about "purty notes." Under Beiderbecke's influence, Carmichael attempted to play the cornet but found his lips unsuited to the mouthpiece and soon stopped. He was also inspired by Beiderbecke's impressionistic and classical music ideas.

Carmichael's first recorded song, initially titled "Free Wheeling," was written for Beiderbecke. The song was later recorded as "Riverboat Shuffle" by Beiderbecke's band, The Wolverines, in 1924 for Gennett Records in Richmond, Indiana, and it became a jazz staple (lyrics by Mitchell Parish were added in 1939). Other early musical compositions by Carmichael included "Washboard Blues" and "Boneyard Shuffle," which were recorded by Curtis Hitch and his band, "Hitch's Happy Harmonists," at Gennett Records. The band's instrumental rendition of "Washboard Blues," recorded on May 19, 1925, was the first recording in which Carmichael performed his own compositions, including an improvised piano solo.

After graduating from IU's law school in 1926, Carmichael moved to Florida, where he worked as a legal clerk in a West Palm Beach law firm. However, after failing the Florida bar exam, he returned to Indiana in 1927. He joined an Indianapolis law firm, Bingham, Mendenhall and Bingham, and passed the Indiana bar exam but ultimately devoted most of his energies to music. Carmichael described his songwriting method as, "You don't write melodies, you find them…If you find the beginning of a good song, and if your fingers do not stray, the melody should come out of hiding in a short time."

== Career ==
Carmichael composed several hundred songs, including fifty that achieved hit-record status during his long career. In his early days as a songwriter in Indiana (1924–1929), he wrote and performed in the Hot Jazz improvisational style, popular with jazz dance bands. While he was living in New York City (1929–1936), he wrote songs that were intended to stand alone, independent of any other production, such as a theatrical performance or a motion picture. Carmichael's songs from this period continued to include jazz influences. During his later years in California (1936–1981), his songs were predominantly instrumentals. Nearly four dozen were written expressly for, or were incorporated into, motion pictures.

Carmichael made hundreds of recordings between 1925 and his death in 1981. He also appeared on radio and television and in motion pictures and live performances, where he demonstrated his versatility. Because Carmichael lacked the vocal strength to sing without amplification on stage, as well as the unusual tone of his voice, which he described as "flatsy through the nose," he took advantage of new electrical technologies, especially the microphone, sound amplification, and advances in recording. As a singer-pianist, Carmichael was adept at selling his songs to lyricists, music publishers, film producers, and promoting them to the public via microphones on stage and in mass media.

=== Early years ===
On October 31, 1927, Carmichael recorded "Star Dust," one of his most famous songs, at the Gennett Records studio in Richmond, Indiana, playing the piano solo himself. Carmichael recruited Frank Trumbauer and Bix Beiderbecke, along with members of the Paul Whiteman Orchestra that included the Dorsey brothers, to play at the late October recording session with him; it is not known which of the orchestra's musicians were at the October 31 session when "Star Dust" was initially recorded. New York's Mills Music published the song as an upbeat piano solo in January 1929 and renamed it "Stardust." (Mills Music republished the song with the addition of Mitchell Parish's lyrics in May 1929.) "Stardust" attracted little attention until 1930, when Isham Jones and his orchestra recorded it as a sentimental ballad with a slower tempo, the re-timing often credited to the band's arranger, Victor Young. It became a hit song, the first of many for Carmichael. Its idiosyncratic melody in medium tempo–a song about a song–later became a standard of the Great American Songbook, recorded by hundreds of artists, including Artie Shaw, Nat King Cole, Ella Fitzgerald, Frank Sinatra, Willie Nelson, and Wynton Marsalis.

Carmichael received more recognition after Paul Whiteman and his orchestra recorded "Washboard Blues" on Victor Records in Chicago in November 1927, with Carmichael singing and playing the piano. Carmichael's "March of the Hoodlums" and Sheldon Brooks's "Walkin' the Dog" were produced from Carmichael's last recording session at the Gennett Records studio on May 2, 1928, with a band he had hand-selected.

In 1929, after realizing that he preferred making music and had no aptitude for or interest in becoming a lawyer (he was sacked from his job at the law firm), Carmichael moved to New York City, where he worked for a brokerage firm during the weekdays and spent his evenings composing music, including some songs for Hollywood musicals. In New York, Carmichael met Duke Ellington's agent and sheet music publisher, Irving Mills, and hired him to set up recording dates. Carmichael's first major song with his own lyrics was "Rockin' Chair," recorded by Louis Armstrong and Mildred Bailey, and eventually with his own hand-picked studio band (featuring Beiderbecke, Bubber Miley, Benny Goodman, Tommy Dorsey, Bud Freeman, Eddie Lang, Joe Venuti, and Gene Krupa) on May 21, 1930.

=== 1930s ===
After the October 1929 stock market crash, Carmichael's hard-earned savings declined substantially. Fortunately, Louis Armstrong had recorded "Rockin' Chair" at Okeh studios in 1929, giving Carmichael a badly needed financial and career boost. The song became one of Carmichael's jazz standards. Carmichael composed and recorded "Georgia on My Mind" (lyrics by Stuart Gorrell) in 1930. The song became another jazz staple, as well as a pop standard, especially after World War II. Carmichael also arranged and recorded "Up a Lazy River" in 1930, a tune by Sidney Arodin. Although Carmichael and the band he assembled had first recorded "Stardust" as an instrumental in 1927, Bing Crosby recorded the tune with Mitchell Parish's lyrics in 1931.

Carmichael joined ASCAP in 1931. The following year he began working as a songwriter for Ralph Peer's Southern Music Company, the first music firm to occupy the new Brill Building, which became a famous New York songwriting mecca. The Great Depression rapidly put an end to the jazz scene of the Roaring Twenties. People were no longer attending clubs or buying music, forcing many musicians out of work. Carmichael was fortunate to retain his low-paying but stable job as a songwriter with Southern Music. Beiderbecke's early death in 1931 also darkened Carmichael's mood. Of that time, he wrote later: "I was tiring of jazz and I could see that other musicians were tiring as well. The boys were losing their enthusiasm for the hot stuff…. No more hot licks, no more thrills."

Carmichael's eulogy for "hot" jazz, however, was premature. Big band swing was just around the corner, and jazz soon turned in another direction with new bandleaders, such as Benny Goodman, Jimmy and Tommy Dorsey, and new singers, such as Bing Crosby, leading the way. Carmichael's output followed the changing trend. In 1933 he began a long-lasting collaboration with lyricist Johnny Mercer, newly arrived in New York, on "Lazybones," which became a hit. Southern Music published the sheet music in 1933; more than 350,000 copies were sold in three months. Carmichael collaborated with Mercer on nearly three dozen songs, including "Thanksgiving," "Moon Country," and the 1951 Academy Award-winner for best song, "In the Cool, Cool, Cool, of the Evening."

Carmichael also began to emerge as a solo singer-performer, first at parties, then professionally. He described his unique, laconic voice as sounding "the way a shaggy dog looks... I have Wabash fog and sycamore twigs in my throat." Some fans were dismayed as he steadily veered away from "hot" jazz, but Armstrong's recordings continued to "jazz up" Carmichael's popular songs. In 1935 Carmichael left Southern Music Company and began composing songs for a division of Warner Brothers, establishing his connection with Hollywood. "Moonburn," the first song Carmichael wrote for a motion picture, was sung by Bing Crosby in Paramount Pictures' film Anything Goes in 1936.

Following his marriage to Ruth Mary Meinardi, the daughter of a Presbyterian minister, on March 14, 1936, the couple moved to California, where Carmichael hoped to find more work in the film industry. In 1937, the year before the birth of the couple's first son, Hoaglund Jr. (Hoagy Bix), Carmichael accepted a contract with Paramount Pictures for $1,000 a week, joining other songwriters working for the Hollywood studios, including Harry Warren at Warner Brothers, E. Y. Harburg at Metro-Goldwyn-Mayer, and Ralph Rainger and Leo Robin at Paramount.

Carmichael found work as a character actor in Hollywood. His on-screen debut occurred in 1937 in Topper, with Cary Grant and Constance Bennett. Carmichael portrayed a piano player and performed his song "Old Man Moon" in the film. The effort led to other character actor roles in the 1940s.

Carmichael also continued to write individual songs. His song "Chimes of Indiana" was presented to Indiana University, Carmichael's alma mater, in 1937 as a gift from the class of 1935. In 1938, Carmichael collaborated with Paramount lyricist Frank Loesser on "Heart and Soul," "Two Sleepy People," and "Small Fry." "Heart and Soul" was included in Paramount's motion picture A Song Is Born (1938), performed by Larry Clinton and his orchestra. (After 1950, a simpler version became a popular piano duet among American children.) Dick Powell premiered Carmichael's "I Get Along Without You Very Well (Except Sometimes)" in a national radio broadcast in 1938.

"Little Old Lady," included in The Show Is On (1936), was Carmichael's first song to appear in a Broadway musical and became a hit, but Carmichael's score for the Broadway production Walk with Music, which he did with Mercer, was unsuccessful. The musical opened in 1940 and ran for only three weeks, producing no hit songs. Carmichael never attempted another musical, resuming his career as a singer-songwriter and character actor in Hollywood.

=== 1940s ===
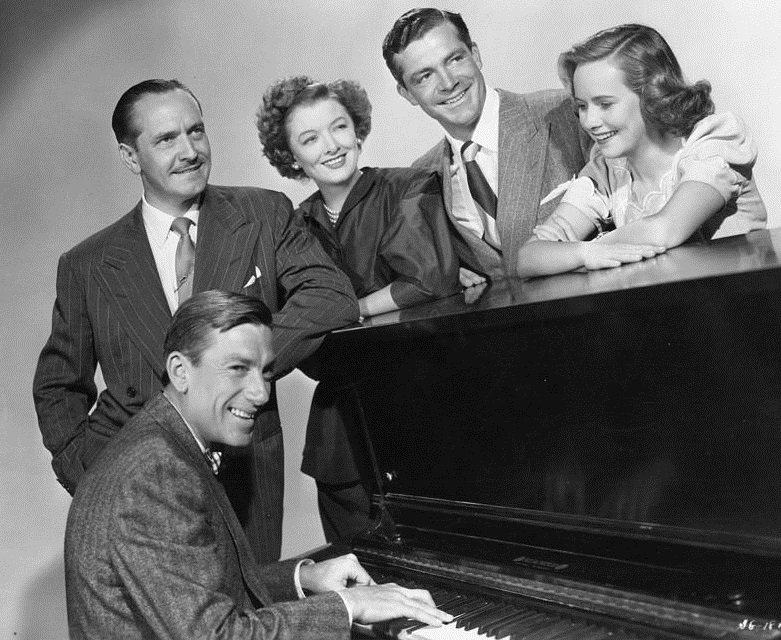
Carmichael, Fredric March, Myrna Loy, Dana Andrews and Theresa Wright in The Best Years of Our Lives (1946)

The growing Carmichael family, which included Hoagy, Ruth, and their sons, Hoagy Bix (born in 1938) and Randy Bob (born in 1940), moved into the former mansion of chewing-gum heir William P. Wrigley Jr. in Los Angeles in 1942, when the United States entered World War II after the attack on Pearl Harbor. His contribution to the war effort was similar to other patriotic efforts by Irving Berlin ("This Is the Army, Mr. Jones"), Johnny Mercer ("G.I. Jive"), and Frank Loesser ("Praise the Lord and Pass the Ammunition"). Carmichael's wartime songs (most with lyrics by Paul Francis Webster) included "My Christmas Song for You," "Don't Forget to Say 'No' Baby," "Billy-a-Dick," "The Army of Hippocrates," "Cranky Old Yank," "Eager Beaver," "No More Toujours l'Amour," "Morning Glory," and the never-completed "Hitler Blues."

Throughout the 1940s Carmichael maintained a strong personal and professional relationship with Mercer. In later 1941 their continuing collaboration led to "Skylark," considered one of Carmichael's greatest songs. Bing Crosby recorded it almost immediately in January 1942. Since then many others have recorded the song, including Glenn Miller, Dinah Shore, Helen Forrest (with Harry James), Aretha Franklin and Bette Midler.

Carmichael's 1942 song "I'm a Cranky Old Yank" was listed in the 1967 edition of the Guinness Book of Records under the title "I'm a Cranky Old Yank in a Clanky Old Tank on the Streets of Yokohama with My Honolulu Mama Doin' Those Beat-o, Beat-o Flat-On-My-Seat-o, Hirohito Blues" as the longest song title.

Carmichael appeared as an actor in 14 motion pictures, performing at least one of his songs in each. He described his on-screen persona as the "hound-dog-faced old musical philosopher noodling on the honky-tonk piano, saying to a tart with a heart of gold: 'He'll be back, honey. He's all man.'" In 1944 Carmichael played Cricket in the screen adaptation of Ernest Hemingway's To Have and Have Not, opposite Humphrey Bogart and Lauren Bacall. He sang "Hong Kong Blues" and "The Rhumba Jumps," and played piano as Bacall sang "How Little We Know." In the multi-Academy Award-winning film The Best Years of Our Lives (1946) with Dana Andrews, Myrna Loy and Fredric March, Carmichael's character teaches a disabled veteran with metal prostheses to play "Chopsticks," and also performs "Lazy River." Carmichael played Hi Linnett in Canyon Passage (1946), a Universal Pictures western that starred Dana Andrews (his costar in The Best Years of Our Lives and Night Song), Susan Hayward, and Brian Donlevy. He also composed several songs for the film, including "Ole Buttermilk Sky," an Academy Award nominee.

Carmichael's career as a recording artist peaked in the mid-1940s when he recorded exclusively for Decca Records and V-Disc (the Armed Forces label for service personnel overseas), acted and performed in motion pictures, and hosted variety shows on the radio. He also sang in live shows across the United States, and debuted in the United Kingdom at the London Casino in 1948. According to his son Randy, Carmichael was an incessant composer, working on a song for days or even weeks until it was perfect. His perfectionism extended to his clothes, grooming, and eating. Once the work was done, however, Carmichael would cut loose—relax, play golf, drink, and indulge in the Hollywood high life. Carmichael also found time to write his first autobiography, The Stardust Road, published in 1946. In addition, Carmichael composed an orchestral work, Brown County in Autumn, in 1948, but it was not well received by critics.

Between 1944 and 1948, Carmichael became a well-known radio personality and hosted three musical-variety programs. In 1944–45, the 30-minute Tonight at Hoagy's aired on Mutual radio on Sunday nights at 8:30 p.m. (Pacific time), sponsored by Safeway supermarkets. Produced by Walter Snow, the show featured Carmichael as host and vocalist. Musicians included Pee Wee Hunt and Joe Venuti. Fans were rather blunt about Carmichael's singing, providing comments such as "you cannot sing for your soul" and "your singing is so delightfully awful that it is really funny."

=== 1950s ===
During the 1950s, the public's musical preferences shifted toward rhythm and blues and rock and roll, ending the careers of most older artists. Carmichael's songwriting career also slowed down, but he continued to perform.

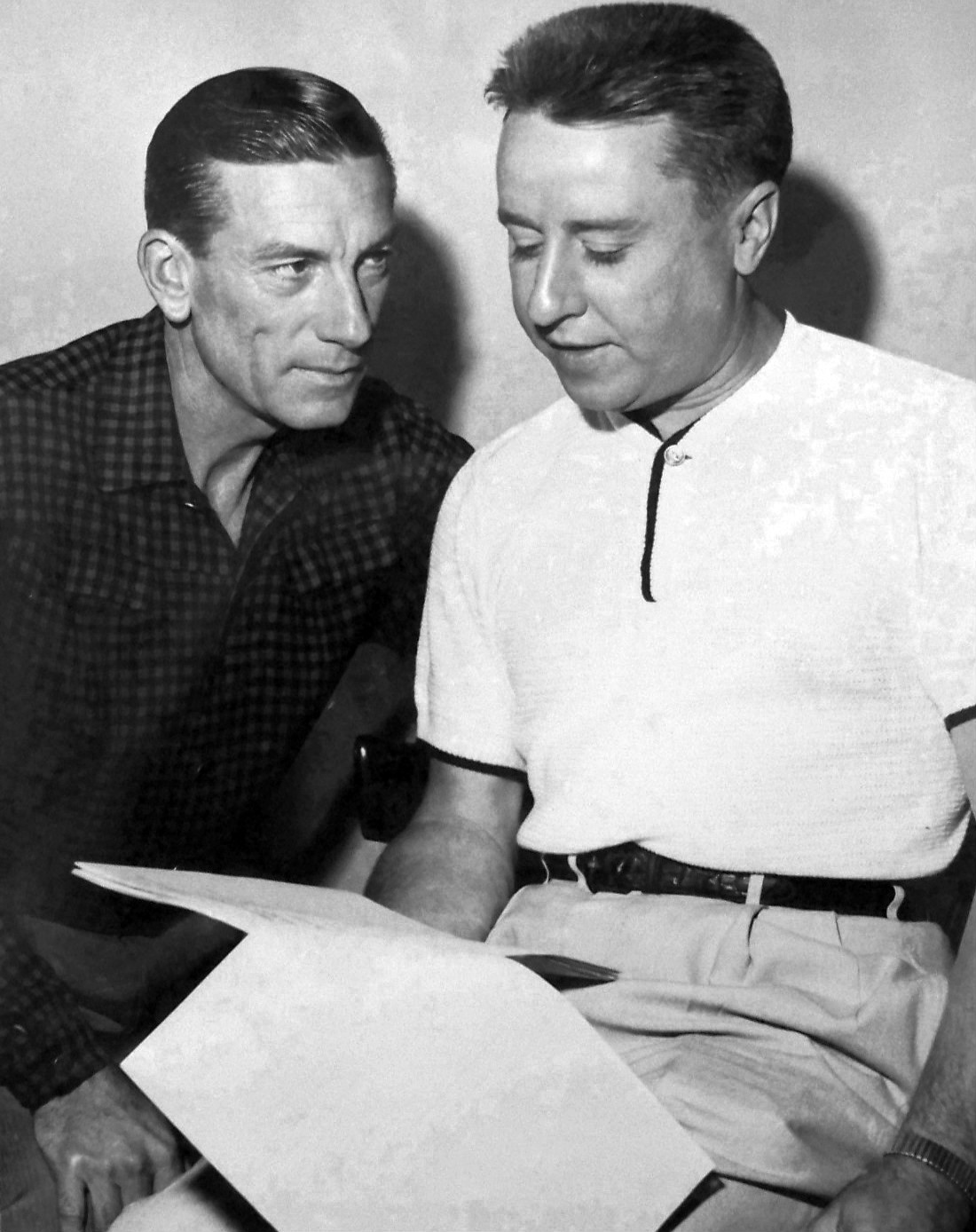
Carmichael sharing the Saturday Night Revue duties with George Gobel, 1953

In the early 1950s, variety shows were particularly popular on television. Carmichael's most notable appearance was as the host of Saturday Night Review in June 1953, a summer replacement series for Your Show of Shows. He was also a regular cast member in the first season of NBC's western TV series Laramie (1959–63), playing the character role of Jonesy the ranch hand.

As his songwriting career started to fade, Carmichael's marriage also dissolved. He and his wife Ruth divorced in 1955.

The Johnny Appleseed Suite, Carmichael's second classical work for orchestra, suffered the same ill fate as his earlier attempt, Brown County Autumn. The suite received little notice and only limited success, but Carmichael remained financially secure due to the royalties from his past hits. During the 1940s and 1950s Carmichael also wrote more than a dozen songs for children, including "The Whale Song," "Merry-Go-Round," and "Rocket Ship."

=== Later years ===
Ray Charles's classic rendition of "Georgia on My Mind", released on August 19, 1960, was a major hit. (Charles received Grammys both for Best Male Vocal and Best Popular Single that year.) In 1961, Carmichael was featured in an episode of The Flintstones titled "The Hit Songwriters". Jerry Lee Lewis recorded "Hong Kong Blues" during his final Sun sessions in 1963, but it was never released. In 1964, while the Beatles were exploding on the scene, Carmichael lamented, "I'll betcha I have 25 songs lying in my trunk" and no one was calling to say "have you got a real good song for such-and such an artist." (Beatles guitarist George Harrison released covers of "Baltimore Oriole" and "Hong Kong Blues" in early 1981.) Royalties on his standards were earning Carmichael over $300,000 a year.

Carmichael's second memoir, Sometimes I Wonder: The Story of Hoagy Carmichael, was published in 1965. By 1967 he was spending time in New York, but his new songs were unsuccessful and his musical career came to a close. Carmichael took up other interests in retirement, including golf, coin collecting, and enjoying his two homes, one on Sunset Boulevard in Los Angeles and the other in Rancho Mirage, California.

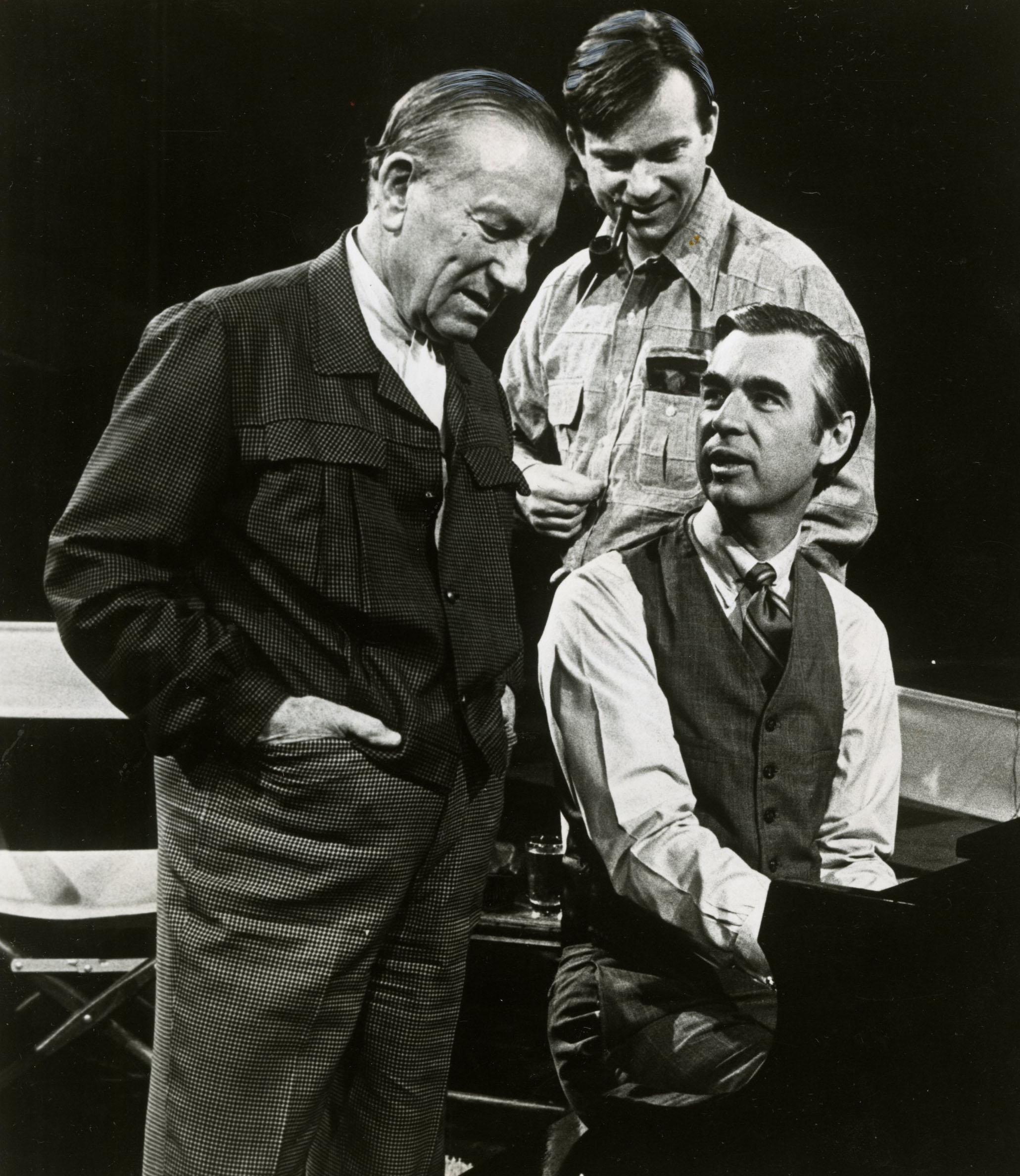
Carmichael, son Hoagy Bix Carmichael and Fred Rogers in 1978

As he passed his 70th birthday, Carmichael's star continued to wane and was nearly forgotten in a world dominated by rock music. With the help and encouragement of his son, Hoagy Bix Carmichael, Carmichael participated in the PBS television show Hoagy Carmichael's Music Shop, which featured jazz-rock versions of his hits by Stark Reality. He appeared on Fred Rogers's PBS show Old Friends, New Friends in 1978. With more time on his hands, Carmichael resumed painting, and after a long courtship he married Dorothy Wanda McKay, an actress, in 1977.

Carmichael received several honors from the music industry in his later years. He was inducted into the USA's Songwriters Hall of Fame in 1971, along with Duke Ellington. In 1972, Indiana University awarded Carmichael an honorary doctorate in music. On June 27, 1979, the Newport Jazz Festival honored Carmichael's 80th birthday with a concert titled "The Stardust Road: A Hoagy Carmichael Jubilee" in Carnegie Hall. The tribute concert was hosted by former bandleader Bob Crosby and included performances by many major musical performers, such as singers Kay Starr, Jackie Cain, Dave Frishberg, and Max Morath, and musicians Billy Butterfield, Bob Wilber, Yank Lawson, Vic Dickenson, and Bob Haggart. National Public Radio broadcast the concert later that summer. "Piano Pedal Rag," a new Carmichael tune, was performed during the concert. Carmichael told host Crosby that he wrote it because he admired Beiderbecke's writing "so much that I didn't want to stop until I wrote something that was a little bit like something Bix might have liked."

On his 80th birthday, Carmichael was reflective, observing, "I'm a bit disappointed in myself. I know I could have accomplished a hell of a lot more. ... I could write anything any time I wanted to. But I let other things get in the way. ... I've been floating around in the breeze." He spent his final years at home in Rancho Mirage, near Palm Springs, California, where he continued to play golf and remained an avid coin collector.

Shortly before his death in 1981, Carmichael appeared on a United Kingdom-recorded tribute album, In Hoagland (1981), with Annie Ross and Georgie Fame. Carmichael sang and played "Rockin' Chair" on the piano. His last public appearance occurred in early 1981, when he filmed Country Comes Home with country music performer Crystal Gayle for CBS.

=== Political views ===
According to his biographer, Carmichael had supported the Republican Party since his youth, and did so throughout his life. He voted for Wendell Willkie at the 1940 presidential election, and backed Barry Goldwater, the party's candidate, at the 1964 United States presidential election.

== Later life and death ==
Carmichael married Wanda McKay in 1977. He died of a heart attack at the Eisenhower Medical Center in Rancho Mirage, California, on December 27, 1981, at age 82. His remains are buried in Rose Hill Cemetery in Bloomington, Indiana.

== Legacy ==
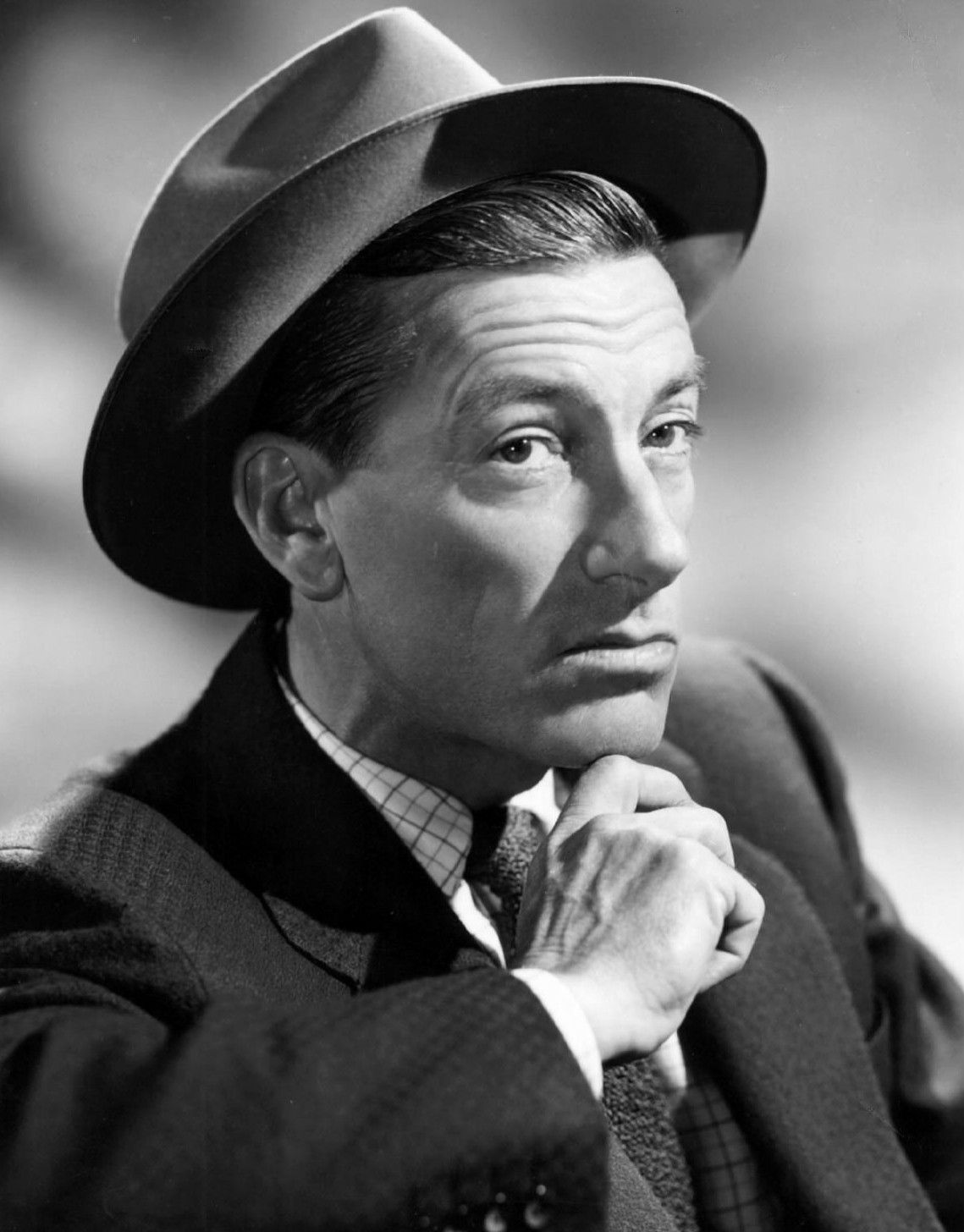
Carmichael ca. 1953 hosting Saturday Night Revue, a summer replacement television show for Your Show of Shows

Carmichael is considered to be among the most successful of the Tin Pan Alley songwriters of the 1930s, and he was among the first singer-songwriters in the age of mass media to exploit new communication technologies, such as television and the use of electronic microphones and sound recordings. Carmichael was an industry trailblazer who recorded varied interpretations of his own songs and provided material for many other musicians to interpret. His creative work includes several hundred compositions, some of them enduring classics, as well as numerous sound recordings and appearances on radio and television and in motion pictures.

Music historian Ivan Raykoff described Carmichael as "one of America's most prolific songwriters" and an "iconic pianist" whose work appeared in more than a dozen Hollywood films, including his performances in classic films such as To Have and Have Not and The Best Years of Our Lives. Among the hundreds of Carmichael's published songs, "Stardust" is one of the most frequently recorded. Carmichael's greatest strength was as a melodist, but he also became known as an "experimental" and "innovative" songwriter, whose "catchy, often jazz-infused, melodies" and "nostalgic, down-home lyrics" were memorable and had wide public appeal, especially with mass media promotion and through the efforts of numerous entertainers who performed his songs.

In 1986, Carmichael's family donated his archives, piano, and memorabilia to his alma mater, Indiana University, which established a Hoagy Carmichael Collection in its Archives of Traditional Music and the Hoagy Carmichael Room to permanently display selections from the collection. Carmichael was an avid coin collector; his coin collection was auctioned off on January 27 and 28, 1986 at the Century Plaza Hotel.

== Honors and tributes ==
Carmichael and lyricist Johnny Mercer received an Academy Award for Best Music, Song, for "In the Cool, Cool, Cool of the Evening," which was featured in the 1951 film Here Comes the Groom. "Ole Buttermilk Sky" received an Oscar nomination for Best Music, Song, of 1946, but it was not the winner. Carmichael's recording of "Star Dust" in 1927 at the Gennett Records studio that includes him playing the piano solo was inducted into the Grammy Hall of Fame. In addition, it was selected for inclusion in the National Recording Registry at the Library of Congress in 2004.

Carmichael was inducted into the Hollywood Walk of Fame on February 8, 1960. (His sidewalk star tribute is located at 1720 Vine Street in Hollywood.) In 1971 Carmichael was inducted into the Songwriters Hall of Fame as one of its initial ten inductees. In 2007 Carmichael was inducted into the Gennett Records Walk of Fame in Richmond, Indiana. Bronze and ceramic medallions, one for each of the inductees, have been placed near the location of the Starr Piano Company's manufacturing complex.

Carmichael is memorialized with an Indiana state historical marker, installed in 2007 in front of the former Book Nook (one of Carmichael's favorite local hangouts) on South Indiana Avenue, near the corner of Kirkwood and Indiana Streets in Bloomington. The marker is located across the street from the heart of the Indiana University campus. In 2008, the bronze Hoagy Carmichael Landmark Sculpture by artist Michael McAuley was installed at the northeast corner of the IU Auditorium on IU's Bloomington campus.

On June 27, 1979, the Newport Jazz Festival honored Carmichael with a tribute concert, "The Star Dust Road: A Hoagy Carmichael Jubilee," at New York City's Carnegie Hall.

"Georgia On My Mind," composed by Carmichael with lyrics by Stuart Gorrell, is the U.S. state of Georgia's official song.

Carmichael also appeared as a Stone Age version of himself in The Flintstones, in which he sings "The Yabba Dabba Doo Song," written by Barney Rubble, and based on an idea from Fred Flintstone. Fred, Barney, Wilma Flintstone, and Betty Rubble also contribute to the lyrics.

=== In popular culture ===
In Ian Fleming's first James Bond novel, Casino Royale, both Bond's fellow secret agent René Mathis and his love interest Vesper Lynd remark that Bond looks like Hoagy Carmichael. Later in the novel, after looking at his reflection in a mirror, Bond disagrees. Ian Fleming repeated the comparison to Carmichael in his third James Bond novel, Moonraker.

== Filmography ==
Year	Title	Role	Notes
1937	Topper	Piano Player	Uncredited
1944	To Have and Have Not	Cricket	
1945	Johnny Angel	Celestial O'Brien	
1946	Canyon Passage	Hi Linnet	
1946	The Best Years of Our Lives	Uncle Butch Engle	
1948	Night Song	Chick Morgan	
1949	Johnny Holiday	Himself	
1950	Young Man with a Horn	Smoke Willoughby	
1952	The Las Vegas Story	Happy	
1952	Belles on Their Toes	Thomas George Bracken	
1955	Timberjack	Jingles	
1959-1960	Laramie	Jonesy	31 episodes
1961	The Flintstones	Himself (voice)	"The Hit Songwriters"
1965	The Man Who Bought Paradise	Mr Leoni	TV movie

== Songs (selection) ==
Year	Song	Lyrics by
1924	"Riverboat Shuffle"	Carmichael, Dick Voynow, Irving Mills, Mitchell Parish
1925	"Washboard Blues"	Carmichael, Fred B. Callahan, Irving Mills
1928	"Stardust"	Mitchell Parish
1929	"Rockin' Chair"	Carmichael
1930	"Georgia on My Mind"	Stuart Gorrell
1931	"Come Easy Go Easy Love"	Sunny Clapp
1931	"(Up a) Lazy River"	Carmichael and Sidney Arodin
1932	"New Orleans"	Carmichael
1932	"Daybreak"	Carmichael
1932	"In the Still of the Night"	Jo Trent
1933	"Lazybones"	Carmichael and Johnny Mercer
1933	"One Morning in May"	Mitchell Parish
1936	"Little Old Lady"	Carmichael and Stanley Adams
1936	"Lyin' to Myself"	Stanley Adams
1936	"Moonburn"	Edward Heyman
1937	"Old Man Moon"	Unknown
1937	"The Nearness of You"	Ned Washington
1938	"Heart and Soul"	Frank Loesser
1938	"Small Fry"	Frank Loesser
1938	"Two Sleepy People"	Frank Loesser
1938	"I Get Along Without You Very Well (Except Sometimes)"	Jane Brown Thompson
1939	"Hong Kong Blues"	Carmichael
1940	"Can't Get Indiana Off My Mind"	Robert DeLeon
1940	"I Walk with Music"	Johnny Mercer
1940	"Way Back in 1939 A.D."	Johnny Mercer
1941	"Skylark"	Johnny Mercer
1941	"We're The Couple In The Castle"	Frank Loesser
1942	"Baltimore Oriole"	Paul Francis Webster
1942	"The Lamplighter's Serenade"	Paul Francis Webster
1943	"Old Music Master"	Johnny Mercer
1945	"Billy-a-Dick"	Paul Francis Webster
1945	"Doctor, Lawyer, Indian Chief"	Paul Francis Webster
1945	"Memphis in June"	Paul Francis Webster
1946	"Ole Buttermilk Sky"	Carmichael and Jack Brooks
1951	"Who Killed the Black Widder"	Hoagy Carmichael, Janice Torre & Fred Spielman
1951	"In the Cool, Cool, Cool of the Evening"	Johnny Mercer
1951	"My Resistance Is Low"	Harold Adamson
1952	"Watermelon Weather"	Paul Francis Webster
1953	"Ain't There Anyone Here for Love?"	Harold Adamson
1953	"When Love Goes Wrong (Nothin' Goes Right)"	Harold Adamson

== Discography ==
- 1944–45 V-Disc Sessions (Totem, 1985)
- At Home with Hoagy (Take Two, 1982)
- Hoagy Carmichael (RCA International, 1981)
- Hoagy Carmichael: Old Buttermilk Sky (Collector's Choice, 1999)
- Hoagy Sings Carmichael (Pacific Jazz, 1957)
- Star Dust, 1927–32 (Historical, 1982)
- The Stardust Road (MCA, 1982)
- Stardust and Much More (Bluebird, 1989)
- Stardust Melody: Carmichael and Friends (RCA, 2002)
- The Classic Hoagy Carmichael (Indiana Historical Society and the Smithsonian Institution's Collection of Recordings, 1988)
- The Hoagy Carmichael Songbook (RCA Bluebird, 1990)
- Stardust: The Jazz Giants Play Hoagy Carmichael (Prestige, 1997)
- Mr. Music Master (Naxos, 2002)
- Hoagy Carmichael in Person 1925–1955 (Avid, 2006)
- The First of the Singer Songwriters (JSP, 2008)

=== Tributes ===
- Stark Reality: The Stark Reality Discovers Hoagy Carmichael's Music Shop (1970)

== Other published works ==
Carmichael wrote two autobiographies that Da Capo Press combined into a single volume for a paperback, published in 1999:

- The Stardust Road (1946)
- Sometimes I Wonder: The Story of Hoagy Carmichael (1965)

== See also ==
- Martha Carmichael Clayton, his sister
- The Archives of Traditional Music, Indiana University
