= Jack Brooks (lyricist) =

American lyricist

- Born: February 14, 1912; Liverpool, United Kingdom
- Died: November 8, 1971 (aged 59); Los Angeles, California, U.S
- Occupation: Lyricist

Jack Brooks (February 14, 1912 – November 8, 1971) was an English-American lyricist of popular songs who was nominated for the Academy Award in 1947, 1953 and 1954.

Brooks was born in Liverpool. His family was Jewish and originally from Russia, having changed their surname to Brooks from Bruch. They immigrated to the United States in 1916, during the middle of World War I, when Jack was four. He wrote lyrics of many popular songs, including "Ole Buttermilk Sky" (with Hoagy Carmichael) "That's Amore" (with Harry Warren) and "(Roll Along) Wagon Train" (with Sammy Fain) the second theme music used on the television Western, Wagon Train. He joined the American Society of Composers, Authors and Publishers (ASCAP) in 1946.

"Ole Buttermilk Sky" was written for the 1946 film Canyon Passage, and was sung by Carmichael in the movie. It was nominated for an Academy Award for Best Original Song and became a big hit for Kay Kyser that year.

"That's Amore" first appeared in the 1953 film The Caddy where it was sung by Dean Martin. The song was an Academy Award for Best Original Song nominee in 1954. It was a signature song for Martin for decades. Music critic Joe Queenan has described the song as "A charming, if goofy, parody of popular Neapolitan organ-grinder music".

Brooks also wrote the lyrics for many other film songs, such as "Let Me Be a People" and "Turn It On" in Jerry Lewis' 1960 film, Cinderfella.

He died at the age of 59 in Los Angeles.
