= The Fearmakers =

1958 film by Jacques Tourneur

- Theatrical release poster
- Directed by: Jacques Tourneur
- Screenplay by: Elliot West; Chris Appley
- Based on: The Fear Makers; 1945 novel by Darwin Teilhet
- Produced by: Martin H. Lancer
- Starring: Dana Andrews
- Cinematography: Sam Leavitt
- Edited by: James Whittredge
- Music by: Irving Gertz
- Color process: Black and white
- Production company: Pacemaker
- Distributed by: United Artists
- Release date: October 1958
- Running time: 85 minutes
- Country: United States
- Language: English

The Fearmakers is a 1958 American film noir crime film directed by Jacques Tourneur and starring Dana Andrews. The screenplay is based on the 1945 novel of the same name by Darwin Teilhet. The film centers on seemingly nonpartisan political messages that are shaped by a public-relations firm secretly controlled by communists determined to undermine the American government.

== Plot ==
Korean War veteran Alan Eaton, who suffered through brainwashing as a P.O.W., returns home and resumes his job at a public-relations and opinion-research firm in Washington, D.C. His partner has been killed mysteriously in an accident, and he discovers that his company has been taken over by communist infiltrators intent on fixing public opinion polls and promoting communist organizations. To stop them, Eaton cooperates with a Senate investigation.

== Cast ==
- Dana Andrews as Alan Eaton
- Dick Foran as Jim McGinnis
- Marilee Earle as Lorraine Dennis
- Veda Ann Borg as Vivian Loder
- Kelly Thordsen as Harold 'Hal' Loder
- Roy Gordon as Sen. Walder
- Joel Marston as Rodney Hillyer
- Dennis Moore as Army Doctor
- Oliver Blake as Dr. Gregory Jessup
- Janet Brandt as Walder's Secretary
- Fran Andrade as TWA Stewardess
- Mel Tormé as Barney Bond (as Mel Tormé)

== See also ==
- List of American films of 1958
