= No Room for the Groom =

1952 film by Douglas Sirk

- Film poster by Reynold Brown
- Directed by: Douglas Sirk
- Screenplay by: Joseph Hoffman
- Based on: Darwin L. Teilhet
- Produced by: Ted Richmond
- Starring: Tony Curtis; Piper Laurie; Don DeFore
- Cinematography: Clifford Stine
- Edited by: Russell F. Schoengarth
- Music by: Frank Skinner
- Production company: Universal Pictures
- Distributed by: Universal Pictures
- Release date: June 13, 1952 (United States)
- Running time: 82 minutes
- Country: United States
- Language: English

No Room for the Groom is a 1952 American comedy film directed by Douglas Sirk and starring Tony Curtis, Piper Laurie, Don DeFore and Spring Byington. The screenplay is based on the novel My True Love by Darwin Teilhet.

== Plot ==
Vineyard owner Alvah Morrell and his girlfriend Lee Kingshead elope to Las Vegas before he must return to active military duty. They are unable to have a honeymoon because Alvah comes down with a case of chicken pox and Lee must be quarantined from him.

Alvah leaves for 10 months. During this time, Lee finds no suitable way or time to tell her manipulative mother about the marriage. Mama pretends to have fainting spells and hides her personal foibles, which include smoking and gambling.

Mama's goal is to marry Lee to the wealthy Herman Strouple, who owns a thriving cement business. Mama hopes to keep the married couple apart so that their union will never be consummated and can be legally annulled.

By the time Alvah returns, so many people are pressuring him to sell his vineyard land and home to Herman that he feels alone, particularly when others conspire to have Alvah declared mentally ill and unable to conduct his own affairs. He must trust Lee to do the right thing, and soon they're finally spending their first night together.

== Cast ==
- Tony Curtis as Alvah Morrell
- Piper Laurie as Lee Kingshead
- Don DeFore as Herman Strouple
- Spring Byington as Mama Kingshead
- Lillian Bronson as Aunt Elsa
- Paul McVey as Dr. Trotter
- Stephen Chase as Mr. Taylor
- Lee Aaker as Donovan
- Jack Kelly as Will Stubbins
- Frank Sully as Cousin Luke
- Fess Parker as Cousin Ben (uncredited)

== Reception ==
The Guardian recalled the film for the presence of co-stars Curtis and Laurie, forming a "likable team once more".

== Screenings ==
The film was screened in 2005 and 2022 at the French Cinemathèque in Paris, as part of Sirk retrospectives.

== See also ==
- List of American films of 1952
