= Lucky Cisco Kid =

1940 film by H. Bruce Humberstone

- 1940 US Theatrical poster
- Directed by: H. Bruce Humberstone
- Screenplay by: Robert Ellis; Helen Logan
- Story by: Julian Johnson
- Based on: The Cisco Kid (character) by O. Henry
- Produced by: Sol M. Wurtzel
- Starring: Cesar Romero; Mary Beth Hughes; Dana Andrews; Evelyn Venable; Chris-Pin Martin
- Cinematography: Lucien N. Andriot
- Edited by: Fred Allen
- Music by: Cyril J. Mockridge
- Distributed by: 20th Century Fox
- Release date: June 23, 1940
- Running time: 67 minutes
- Country: United States
- Language: English

Lucky Cisco Kid is a 1940 Western film directed by H. Bruce Humberstone and starring Cesar Romero, Mary Beth Hughes, and Dana Andrews, the latter in his film debut.

== Plot ==
A gang of outlaws, led by Judge McQuade, are committing crimes and blaming it on the Cisco Kid, in McQuade's attempt to drive the settlers off the land and buy it himself. The Cisco Kid and Gordito eventually stop the scheme, and the Kid falls in love with widow Emily Lawrence.

== Cast ==
- Cesar Romero as The Cisco Kid
- Mary Beth Hughes as Lola
- Dana Andrews as Sergeant Dunn
- Evelyn Venable as Emily Lawrence
- Chris-Pin Martin as Gordito
- Willard Robertson as Judge McQuade
- Joe Sawyer as Bill Stevens
- Johnny Sheffield as Tommy Lawrence
- William Royle as Sheriff
- Adrian Morris as Smoketree's Partner
- Lillian Yarbo as Queenie (uncredited)
