= Canyon Passage =

1946 film

- U.S. theatrical poster for Canyon Passage (1946)
- Directed by: Jacques Tourneur
- Written by: Ernest Pascal; Ernest Haycox; Saturday Evening Post magazine (1945 novelette)
- Produced by: Walter Wanger
- Starring: Dana Andrews; Brian Donlevy; Susan Hayward; Patricia Roc
- Cinematography: Edward Cronjager
- Edited by: Milton Carruth
- Color process: Technicolor
- Production company: Walter Wanger Productions
- Distributed by: Universal Pictures
- Release dates: July 15, 1946 (Portland, Oregon); July 17, 1946 (United States)
- Running time: 92 minutes
- Country: United States
- Language: English
- Budget: $2,623,925
- Box office: $4,263,651

Canyon Passage is a 1946 American Western film directed by Jacques Tourneur, and set in the American frontier era of the old Oregon Territory in the mid-1850s. It stars Dana Andrews, Susan Hayward, and Brian Donlevy. Featuring love triangles and an Indian natives uprising, the film was adapted from the 1945 novelette in the Saturday Evening Post magazine of Canyon Passage by Ernest Haycox. Hoagy Carmichael, (music) and Jack Brooks (lyrics) were nominated for Academy Award for Best Original Song for the song "Ole Buttermilk Sky" sung in the film by Carmichael.

== Plot ==
In 1856, ambitious freight company/pack mule line and store owner Logan Stuart (Dana Andrews) agrees to escort Lucy Overmire (Susan Hayward) from the bustling seaport town of Portland home to the (real life) rough-hewn mining settlement of rustic log buildings of Jacksonville, (Jackson County), in the old Oregon Territory, along with his latest shipment of goods. Lucy is engaged to Logan's best friend, George Camrose (Brian Donlevy). The night before they depart, however, Logan has to defend himself from a sneak attack while he was sleeping in his hotel room; though it was too dark to be sure, later throwing the burglar out the broken window, but he believes his assailant is Honey Bragg (Ward Bond). Later, he explains to Lucy that he once saw Bragg leaving the vicinity of two murdered miners. Despite Logan's unwillingness to accuse Bragg directly (since he did not actually witness the crime), Bragg apparently wants to take no chances.

On their journey, Logan and Lucy become attracted to each other. They stop one night at the homestead of Ben Dance (Andy Devine) with his wife (Dorothy Peterson) and family. There, Logan introduces Lucy to his girlfriend, Caroline Marsh (Patricia Roc), whom he gives a decorative locket on a neck chain to.

Once they get to Jacksonville, Logan tries to get friend George to stop playing card games of poker with (and losing to) professional gambler Jack Lestrade (Onslow Stevens), even to advancing him / giving him $2,000 to pay off his earlier cards-playing gambling debts, but George is more interested in the prospect of getting rich quick without doing much hard work. What Logan unfortunately does not know is that friend George has been stealing gold dust from pouches left in his safekeeping by the miners to pay off some of his cards game gambling losses. George also has a secret he is keeping from fiancé Lucy; he keeps flirting with and propositioning gambler Lestrade's wife Marta (Rose Hobart) on the side, who he's attracted to, though she shows no return interest in him.

Bragg keeps trying to provoke Logan into a fight and finally succeeds. Logan wins the brawl, but he does not kill Bragg when he has the chance to finish him off. Humiliated, Bragg shortly later tries to ride Logan down in the street with his horse on his way out of town.

George Camrose decides to move away from the town to make a fresh start and finally gets Lucy to set a date and definitely agree to marry him. Logan then proposes to his own supposed girl Caroline and is accepted, much to the disappointment of Vane Blazier (Victor Cutler), Logan's employee, who is in love with Logan's girlfriend Caroline Marsh himself.

Lucy then decides to accompany Logan South along the Pacific Ocean coast to San Francisco to pick out a wedding dress. Along the way, they are ambushed by Bragg. Though their horses are shot dead, Logan and Lucy escape and return north to town, only to discover that George is now in grave trouble.

When a miner appears months earlier than George had expected and informs him that he wants to recover his pouches of gold on deposit the next day, George kills the drunk miner, worried about being exposed. His crimes are traced back to him as mule-riding musician Hi Linnet (Hoagy Carmichael) earlier happened to see through a window and saw him moving around some gold bags in his safe, stealing some gold, and the dead prospector / miner's lucky special gold nugget is found in George's possession. The locals, led by Johnny Steele (Lloyd Bridges), in an impromptu trial / hearing in the local saloon hall, find George guilty of murder and lock him up, intending a late-night lynching. However, when one of the settlers rides in with a warning that the local Indian tribes are on the warpath after Bragg had attacked and killed one of their young attractive women that he saw swimming nude in a nearby stream, Logan then helps George escape in the confusion.

Logan organizes a posse to defend the village / mining camp and fight off the Indians; Logan's group discovers that the Indians have already killed a number of outlying settlers, including his good friend Ben Dance (Andy Devine) and one of his sons. When Bragg comes in and seeks the town party's protection, Logan refuses and Bragg is soon killed by the Indians. The Indians are then driven off by Logan's men and town posse.

Afterward, Logan and Lucy learn that his escaped friend George was also found and killed by one of the townsfolk. Caroline Marsh also has second thoughts about a marriage to a man like Logan who is devoted to the growth and development of his freight line and pack horse / mule enterprise work plus so frequently away on business; she breaks their engagement and instead accepts Vane Blazier's devotions, agreeing to marry him. Logan and Lucy are now then free to follow their hearts as they had initially discovered each other on the trail. They ride off into the sunset of the picturesque frontier Oregon scenery with ballad singer / guitar player and sometime miner Hi Linnet (Hoagy Carmichael) trotting behind on his mule warbling the film's theme song "'Ole Buttermilk Sky" (which was a popular big hit by Carmichael, Kay Kyser and others in that time period of the late 1940s and early 1950s).

== Cast ==
- Dana Andrews as Logan Stuart
- Brian Donlevy as George Camrose
- Susan Hayward as Lucy Overmire
- Patricia Roc as Caroline Marsh
- Ward Bond as Honey Bragg
- Hoagy Carmichael as Hi Linnet
- Fay Holden as Mrs. Overmire
- Stanley Ridges as Jonas Overmire
- Lloyd Bridges as Johnny Steele
- Andy Devine as Ben Dance
- Victor Cutler as Vane Blazier
- Rose Hobart as Marta Lestrade
- Halliwell Hobbes as Clenchfield (Logan's tightwad business partner from Liverpool, England)
- James Cardwell as Gray Bartlett
- Onslow Stevens as Jack Lestrade, professional gambler
- Erville Alderson as Judge (uncredited)
- Richard Alexander as Miner (uncredited)
- Harlan Briggs as Dr. Balance (uncredited)
- Dorothy Peterson as Mrs. Dance (uncredited)
- Ray Teal as Neal Howison (uncredited)

== Reception ==
The film's July 1946 premiere in Portland, Oregon, attracted large crowds of Oregonians. The arrival of Walter Wanger and the film's stars and other actors, featured a Native American ceremony and a parade through Portland's downtown streets led by the then 25th Governor of Oregon, Earl W. Snell.

The location photography in the picturesque scenery of the Umpqua National Forest in the Cascade Range, near Crater Lake National Park of southern Oregon, and the performances by Hayward and Roc were praised by critics from Time news magazine and the prominent national daily "newspaper of record" The New York Times. The unsigned film review a month after its release in an August 1946 issue of the latter publication of The Times regretted the film's reliance on formulaic plot devices and characters typical of "sagebrush melodrama," but concluded that, "[w]eighing its good points against its bad ones, 'Canyon Passage' still has a very comfortable margin in its favor."

The film's reputation has grown substantially over the 78 years since despite its sporadic availability on various platforms and formats. Chris Fujiwara would call it as "one of the greatest westerns" in his book The Cinema of Nightfall: Jacques Tourneur and noted film critic and author Jonathan Rosenbaum, hailed it in 2006 as one of a dozen "eccentric Westerns", perhaps the most complex and most impressive of director Tourneur's westerns. Richard Brody, of The New Yorker magazine, would champion the film as well, describing it as "a complex array of subplots and side characters that offers a quasi-sociological view of frontier life. The relentless drinking, gambling, gunplay, and battles with Native Americans blend with struggles for love and money to evoke a raw and violent culture that plays, in the year after the Second World War, had ended, as utterly contemporary; avoiding history and politics, Tourneur serves up, in a dreamlike Technicolor glow, a pastoral film noir." Elliott Stein of The Village Voice would also call it in 2009, a "great, dazzling, underrated and unconventional Western...memorable largely for the director's concentration on the massive beauty of the American landscape."

According to Variety entertainment industry trade magazine, the film earned $2,250,000 in rentals in 1946 but resulted in a loss of $63,784.
