= Strange Lady in Town =

1955 film by Mervyn LeRoy

- Theatrical release poster
- Directed by: Mervyn LeRoy
- Written by: Frank Butler
- Produced by: Mervyn LeRoy
- Starring: Greer Garson; Dana Andrews; Cameron Mitchell
- Cinematography: Harold Rosson
- Edited by: Folmar Blangsted
- Music by: Dimitri Tiomkin
- Distributed by: Warner Bros. Pictures
- Release date: April 12, 1955
- Running time: 112 minutes
- Country: United States
- Language: English
- Box office: $2 million (US)

Strange Lady in Town is a 1955 American Western film directed by Mervyn LeRoy and starring Greer Garson. She plays a doctor who plans to introduce modern techniques of medicine to old Santa Fe in 1880, but is opposed by an established doctor played by Dana Andrews.

== Plot ==
1880: Dr. Julia Garth, traveling from Boston, arrives near Santa Fe, New Mexico, where her brother David is a U.S. Cavalry lieutenant. She soon meets the town's respected physician, Dr. Rourke O'Brien, as well as Father Gabriel Mendoza, who has helped establish a new hospital.

Spurs O'Brien, the tomboy niece of the doctor, has a crush on David. She helps Julia buy a horse and teaches her to ride. Julia begins seeing patients, including a boy having vision problems and a toothache sufferer Billy the Kid has brought to her, but encounters resistance from Dr. O'Brien, who doesn't believe women should be practicing medicine.

David shoots a man who accuses him of cheating at cards, pleading self-defense. Dr. O'Brien can't help but admire and be attracted to Julia, but she declines his marriage proposal, citing prejudices like his toward women as the reason she left Boston in the first place. He is irritated again when Julia gives medical advice to his most distinguished patient, New Mexico's governor, General Lew Wallace.

At a party, David strikes an Army captain who accuses him of cheating and rustling. David admits to Julia that the charges are true, then robs a bank and rides off. Julia and Spurs manage to talk David into surrendering, whereupon he is shot. Julia is pressured to leave town by some townspeople until Dr. O'Brien speaks up on her behalf and proposes, to which she accepts.

== Cast ==
- Greer Garson as Dr. Julia Garth
- Dana Andrews as Dr. Rourke O'Brien
- Cameron Mitchell as Lt. David Garth
- Lois Smith as Spurs
- Walter Hampden as Father Gabriel
- Pedro Gonzalez Gonzalez as Trooper Martinez-Martinez
- John Stephenson as Capt. Taggart
- Adele Jergens as Bella
- Gregory Walcott as Scanlon
- Ralph Moody as Gov. Lew Wallace
- Nick Adams as Billy the Kid
- Paul Wexler as Townsman

== Production ==
=== Filming ===
It was filmed at Old Tucson Studios, Tucson, Arizona.

== See also ==
- List of American Western films of 1955

== External list ==
- Strange Lady in Town at IMDb
- Strange Lady in Town at the TCM Movie Database (archived)
- Strange Lady in Town at the AFI Catalog of Feature Films
