= The Avion My Uncle Flew =

1946 children's novel by Darwin Teilhet

- First UK edition
- Author: Cyrus Fisher
- Illustrator: Richard Floethe
- Language: English
- Genre: Children's literature
- Publisher: Appleton
- Publication date: 1946
- Publication place: United States

The Avion My Uncle Flew is a 1946 children's novel written by Cyrus Fisher and illustrated by Richard Floethe. Johnny Littlehorn is taken to France with his father and French mother after his father is stationed there after World War II. Johnny is reluctant to go, as he has a lame leg after a horse fell on him at the family's ranch. In Paris, he meets Albert, the doorman of the motel, and Monsieur Fischfasse, who wants to buy the family's property. Johnny visits his mother's brother, Paul, who is building the titular glider, and meets the twins Charles and Suzanne. With the help of the twins, they uncover a plot by Nazi collaborators to steal a fortune buried on the family's property.

== Reception ==
The novel was a Newbery Honor recipient in 1947. One Elementary English Review called it a "lively adventure" but patronizing toward boys in another.
