= Dana Andrews =

American actor (1909–1992)

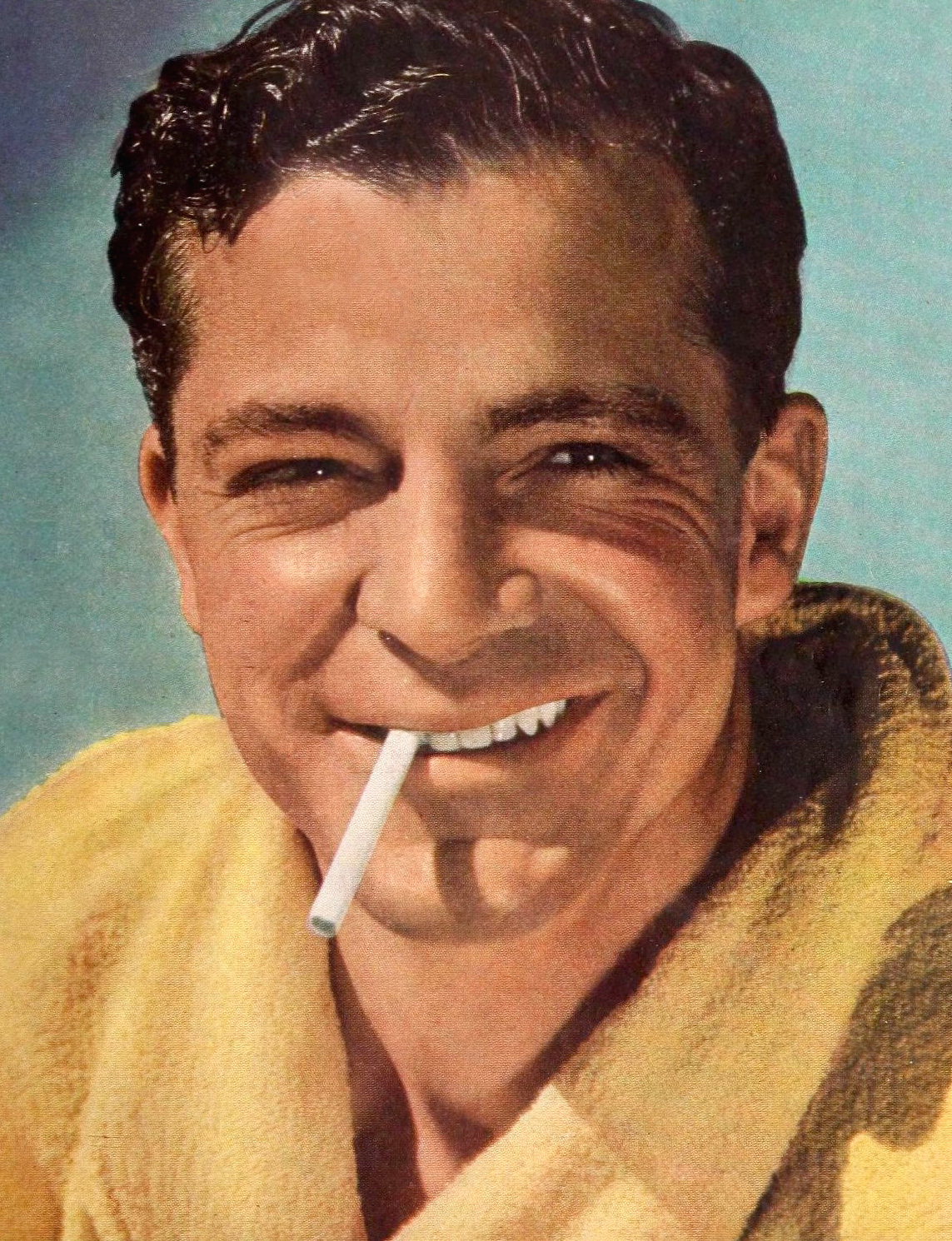
- Andrews in 1945
- Born: Carver Dana Andrews; January 1, 1909; Collins, Mississippi, U.S.
- Died: December 17, 1992 (aged 83); Los Alamitos, California, U.S.
- Occupation: Actor
- Years active: 1938–1985
- Spouses: Janet Murray (m. 1932; died 1935) Mary Todd (m. 1939)
- Relatives: Steve Forrest (brother)

President of the Screen Actors Guild
- In office August 8, 1963 – June 3, 1965
- Preceded by: George Chandler
- Succeeded by: Charlton Heston

Carver Dana Andrews (January 1, 1909 – December 17, 1992) was an American film actor who became a major star in what is now known as film noir and later in Western films. A leading man during the 1940s, he continued acting in less prestigious roles and character parts into the 1980s. He is best known for his portrayal of obsessed police detective Mark McPherson in the noir mystery Laura (1944) and his critically acclaimed performance as World War II veteran Fred Derry returning home in The Best Years of Our Lives (1946).

== Early life ==
Andrews was born on a farmstead near Collins (county seat town of Covington County), in southern Mississippi, the third of 13 children of Charles Forrest Andrews, a Baptist minister, and his wife, Annis (née Speed). The family subsequently relocated west to Huntsville, Texas, the birthplace of his younger siblings, including fellow Hollywood actor Steve Forrest (born William Forrest Andrews, 1925–2013).

Andrews attended college at Sam Houston State University nearby in Huntsville and studied business administration in Houston. During 1931, he traveled to the West Coast to Los Angeles, California, to pursue opportunities as a singer. He worked various jobs, such as at a gas refueling station in the nearby community of Van Nuys. To help the struggling Andrews study music at night, "The station owners stepped in ... with a deal: $50 a week for full-time study, in exchange for a five-year share of possible later earnings", which he started repaying after signing with Goldwyn. The founder of the Hollywood Community Theater, Neely Dickson, disputed the gas station story, saying it was invented by Samuel Goldwyn Studio publicists and that Andrews was discovered at her theater. The Los Angeles Times also attempted to debunk the story.

== Career ==
=== Sam Goldwyn and 20th Century Fox ===
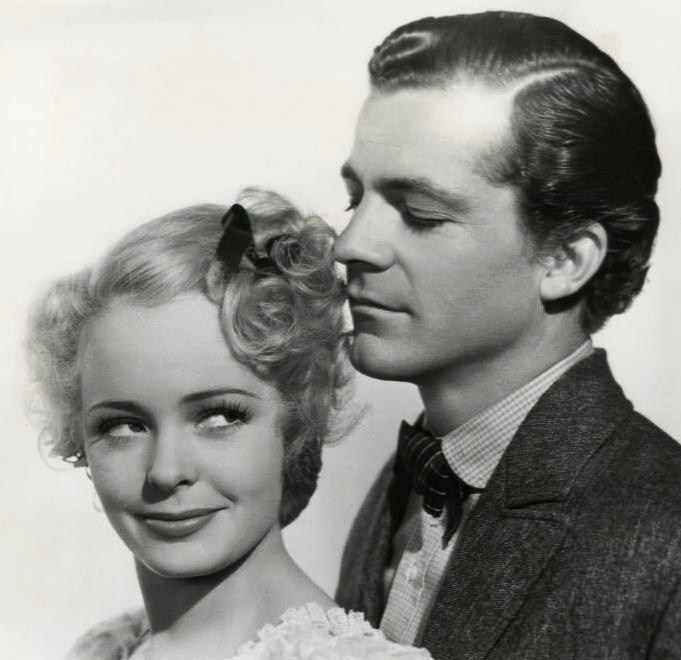
Virginia Gilmore and Dana Andrews in Jean Renoir's production of Swamp Water (1941)

In 1938, Andrews was spotted in the play Oh Evening Star and Samuel Goldwyn (c.1879/1882-1974), signed the promising actor to a contract, but felt he needed time to develop experience. Andrews continued at the Pasadena Playhouse of Pasadena, California, working in over 20 productions and proposed to his second wife Mary Todd. After twelve months, Goldwyn sold part of Andrews' contract to 20th Century-Fox, where he was put to work on the first of two B pictures; his first role was in Lucky Cisco Kid (1940). He then appeared in Sailor's Lady (1940), developed by Goldwyn, but released by Twentieth Century-Fox.

Andrews was loaned to Edward Small to appear in the Western film / bio-pic Kit Carson (1940), before Goldwyn used him for the first time in a Goldwyn studio production of director William Wyler's The Westerner (1940), featuring Gary Cooper.

Andrews had supporting roles in subsequent Twentieth Century-Fox films Tobacco Road (1941), directed by John Ford; then also Belle Starr (1941), co-starring with Randolph Scott and Gene Tierney, billed third; and Swamp Water (1941), starring Walter Brennan and Walter Huston and directed by Jean Renoir.

His next film for Goldwyn was the Howard Hawks directed comedy Ball of Fire (1941), again teaming with Gary Cooper, with Andrews playing the villain, a gangster.

=== Leading man ===
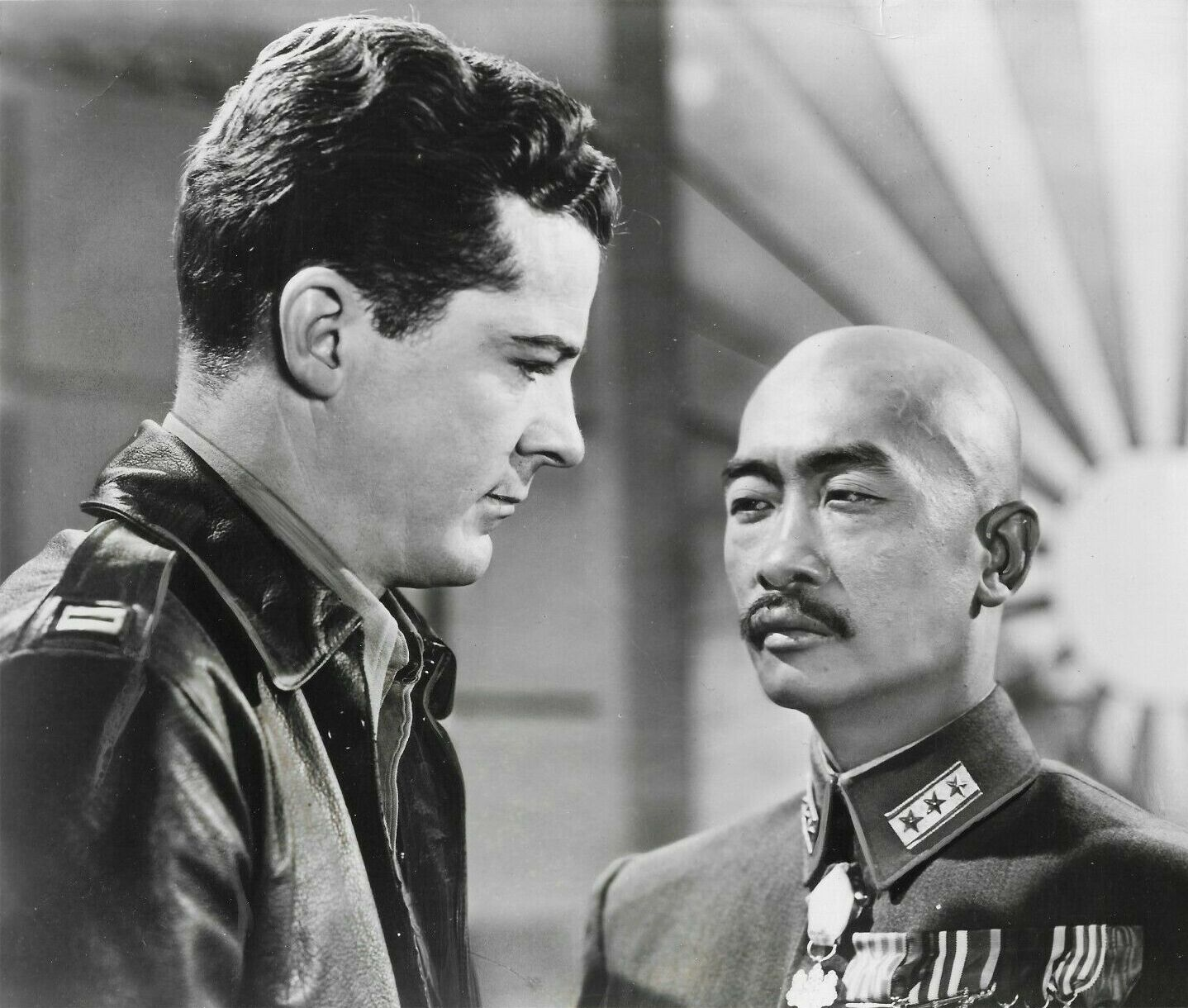
Andrews and Richard Loo in The Purple Heart (1944)

Back at Fox, Andrews was given his first lead, in the B-picture war movie Berlin Correspondent (1942). He was second lead to Tyrone Power in Crash Dive (1943) and then appeared as a lynching target in the 1943 film adaptation of The Ox-Bow Incident with Henry Fonda, giving a performance that Bosley Crowther of the New York Times called "heart-wringing," writing that Andrews "does much to make the picture a profoundly distressing tragedy."

Andrews then went back to Goldwyn for The North Star (1943), directed by Lewis Milestone. He worked on a government propaganda film, December 7: The Movie (1943), then was used by Goldwyn again in Up in Arms (1944), supporting Danny Kaye.

Andrews was reunited with Milestone at Fox for The Purple Heart (1944), then was in Wing and a Prayer (1944) for Henry Hathaway.

=== Critical success and noir ===
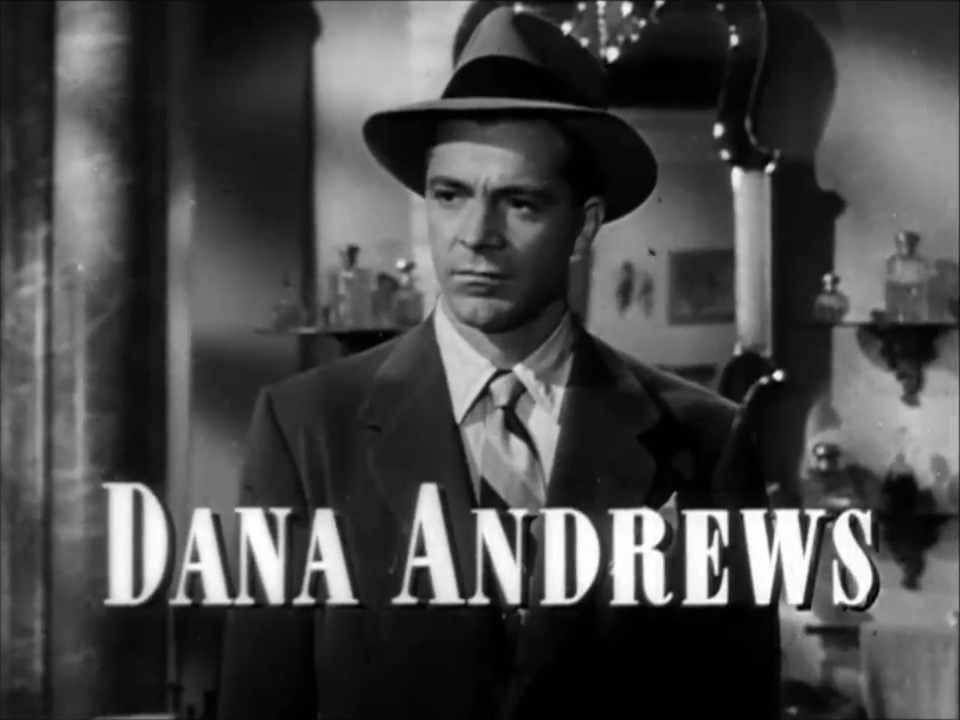
Andrews in the trailer for Laura (1944)

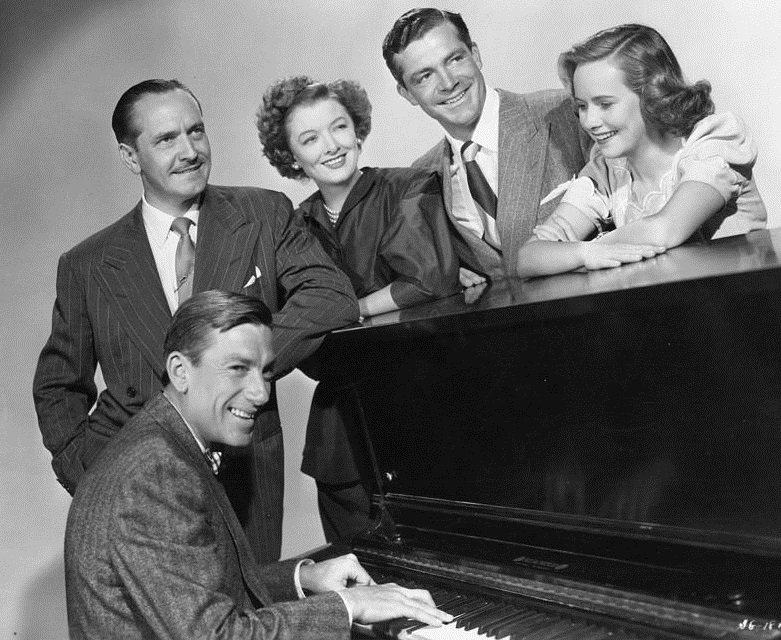
Hoagy Carmichael, Fredric March, Myrna Loy, Andrews and Teresa Wright in The Best Years of Our Lives (1946)

One of his roles was as a detective infatuated with a presumed murder victim, played by Gene Tierney, in Laura (1944), produced at Fox and directed by Otto Preminger. He co-starred with Jeanne Crain in the movie musical State Fair (1945), a huge hit, and was reunited with Preminger for the film noir Fallen Angel (1945). Andrews made another war movie with Milestone, A Walk in the Sun (1945), then was loaned to Walter Wanger for a western, Canyon Passage (1946), directed by Jacques Tourneur and co-featuring Susan Hayward.

Andrews' second film with William Wyler, also for Goldwyn, became his best known: The Best Years of Our Lives (1946). It was both a popular and critical success. Upon release, the topical film about American society's problems in re-integrating military veterans after World War II outgrossed the longstanding box office success of Gone with the Wind (1939) in the U.S. and Britain. In 2007, the film ranked number 37th on AFI's Top 100 Years...100 Movies.

Andrews appeared in Boomerang! (1947), directed by Elia Kazan; Night Song (1947), at RKO; and Daisy Kenyon (1947) for Preminger. In 1947, he was voted the 23rd most popular actor in the U.S.

Andrews starred in the anti-communist The Iron Curtain (1948), reuniting him with Gene Tierney, then Deep Waters (1948). He made a comedy for Lewis Milestone at Enterprise Pictures, No Minor Vices (1948), then traveled to England for Britannia Mews (1949). Andrews was in Sword in the Desert (1949), then Goldwyn cast him in My Foolish Heart (1949) with Susan Hayward. He played a fast-fisted police officer in the film noir Where the Sidewalk Ends (1950), also with Tierney and Preminger. Around this time, alcoholism began to damage Andrews's career, and on two occasions it nearly cost him his life behind the wheel.

Edge of Doom (1950), another film noir for Goldwyn, was a flop. Andrews was then loaned to RKO to make Sealed Cargo (1951), in which his brother Steve Forrest has an uncredited role. (In a "Word of Mouth" commentary for Turner Classic Movies, Forrest stated, "I'd have given my eye teeth to have worked with him.") Back at Fox, Andrews was in The Frogmen (1951), then Goldwyn cast him in I Want You (1951), an overwrought attempt to repeat the success of The Best Years of Our Lives, during the Cold War era Korean War.

From 1952 to 1954, Andrews was featured in the radio series I Was a Communist for the FBI, about the experiences of Matt Cvetic, an FBI informant who infiltrated the Communist Party of the United States of America.

=== Career decline ===
Andrews' film career waned in the 1950s. Assignment: Paris (1952) was not widely seen. He made Elephant Walk (1954) in Ceylon, a film better known for Vivien Leigh's nervous breakdown and replacement by Elizabeth Taylor. Duel in the Jungle (1954) was an adventure tale, Three Hours to Kill (1954) and Smoke Signal (1955) were Westerns, Strange Lady in Town (1955) was a Greer Garson vehicle, and Comanche (1956) another Western.

By the mid-1950s, Andrews was acting almost exclusively in B-movies. However, his acting in two late-cycle film noirs for Fritz Lang during 1956, While The City Sleeps and Beyond a Reasonable Doubt, are well regarded, as are a horror film, Curse of the Demon (1957), and a noir, The Fearmakers (1958), made with Jacques Tourneur. Around this time, he also appeared in Spring Reunion (1957), Zero Hour! (1957) and Enchanted Island (1958).

In 1952, Andrews toured with his wife, Mary Todd, in The Glass Menagerie, and in 1958, he replaced Henry Fonda (his former co-star in The Oxbow Incident and Daisy Kenyon) on Broadway in Two for the Seesaw.

=== 1960s ===
Andrews began appearing on television on such shows as Playhouse 90 ("Right Hand Man", "Alas, Babylon"), General Electric Theatre, The Barbara Stanwyck Show, Checkmate, The DuPont Show of the Week, The Twilight Zone ("No Time Like the Past"), The Dick Powell Theatre, Alcoa Premiere, Ben Casey, and Theatre of Stars.

Andrews continued to make films like The Crowded Sky (1960) and Madison Avenue (1961). He then went to Broadway for The Captains and the Kings, which had a short run in 1962.

In 1963, he was elected president of the Screen Actors Guild.

In 1965, Andrews resumed his film work with support roles in The Satan Bug and In Harm's Way. Although he had the lead in films such as Crack in the World (1965), Brainstorm (1965), and Town Tamer (1965), he was increasingly cast in supporting roles: Berlin, Appointment for the Spies (1965), The Loved One (1965), Battle of the Bulge (1965), and Johnny Reno (1966). He occasionally played leads in low-budget films like The Frozen Dead (1966), The Cobra (1967) and Hot Rods to Hell (1967), however, by the late 1960s he had evolved into a character actor, as in The Ten Million Dollar Grab (1967), No Diamonds for Ursula (1967), and The Devil's Brigade (1968).

By the end of the decade, Andrews returned to television to play the leading role of college president Tom Boswell on the NBC daytime soap opera Bright Promise from its premiere on September 29, 1969, until March 1971.

=== 1970s and 1980s ===
Andrews spent the 1970s in supporting roles of Hollywood films such as The Failing of Raymond (1971), Innocent Bystanders (1972), Airport 1975 (1974), A Shadow in the Streets (1975), The First 36 Hours of Dr. Durant (1975), Take a Hard Ride (1975), The Last Tycoon (1976), The Last Hurrah (1977), and Good Guys Wear Black (1978)

He also appeared regularly on TV in such shows as Ironside, Get Christie Love!, Ellery Queen, The American Girls, The Hardy Boys, and The Love Boat.

It was at this time, the 1970s, that Andrews became involved in the real estate business, telling one newspaper reporter, for example, that he owned "a hotel that brings in $200,000 a year."

Andrews's final roles included Born Again (1978), Ike: The War Years (1979), The Pilot (1980), Falcon Crest (1982–83) and Prince Jack (1985).

== Personal life and death ==
Andrews married Janet Murray on December 31, 1932. Murray died two and a half years later in October 1935 as a result of pneumonia. Their son was later a radio announcer and musical director who died early from an intracerebral hemorrhage in February 1964 at the age of 30. Four years after the death of his first wife, Janet Murray, on November 17, 1939, Andrews married stage actress Mary Todd (1916–2003). She appeared in 1976 on The Bob Braun Show, a local television talk show on WCPO-TV (channel 9) in Cincinnati, Ohio. The couple had three children in addition to a son from Andrews' first marriage.

Andrews struggled with alcoholism, but eventually won the battle and worked actively later with the National Council on Alcoholism, using his experience as a teaching tool. Several years later, during 1972, he appeared in a television public service advertisement concerning the subject of alcohol abuse. During the last years of his life, Andrews also suffered from senility/dementia factors of Alzheimer's disease, which was increasingly occurring in the older American population at a time when Alzheimer's research was in its infancy. He spent his final years living at the John Douglas French Center for Alzheimer's Disease in Los Alamitos (Orange County, California).

On December 17, 1992, Andrews died of congestive heart failure and pneumonia, aged 83. His wife, Mary Todd Andrews, died a decade later in January 2003 at the age of 86, noted in the entertainment magazine Variety the following month.

He is mentioned in the song "Science Fiction/Double Feature", from The Rocky Horror Show.

== Filmography ==
- Lucky Cisco Kid (1940, movie debut) as Sergeant Dunn
- Sailor's Lady (1940) as Scrappy Wilson
- Kit Carson (1940) as Captain John C. Fremont
- The Westerner (1940) as Sergeant Dunn
- Tobacco Road (1941) as Captain Tim
- Belle Starr (1941) as Maj. Thomas Crail
- Swamp Water (1941) as Ben
- Ball of Fire (1941) as Joe Lilac
- Berlin Correspondent (1942) as Bill Roberts
- Crash Dive (1943) as Lt. Cmdr. Dewey Connors
- The Ox-Bow Incident (1943) as Donald Martin
- The North Star (1943) as Kolya Simonov
- December 7th (1943) as Ghost of US Sailor Killed at Pearl Harbor
- Up in Arms (1944) as Joe
- The Purple Heart (1944) as Capt. Harvey Ross
- Wing and a Prayer (1944) as Lt. Cmdr. Edward Moulton
- Laura (1944) as Det. Lt. Mark McPherson
- State Fair (1945) as Pat Gilbert
- Fallen Angel (1945) as Eric Stanton
- A Walk in the Sun (1945) as Sgt. Bill Tyne
- Canyon Passage (1946) as Logan Stuart
- The Best Years of Our Lives (1946) as Fred Derry
- Boomerang (1947) as State's Atty. Henry L. Harvey
- Night Song (1947) as Dan
- Daisy Kenyon (1947) as Dan O'Mara
- The Iron Curtain (1948) as Igor Gouzenko
- Deep Waters (1948) as Hod Stillwell
- No Minor Vices (1948) as Perry Ashwell
- The Forbidden Street (1949) as Henry Lambert / Gilbert Lauderdale
- Sword in the Desert (1949) as Mike Dillon
- My Foolish Heart (1949) as Walt Dreiser
- Where the Sidewalk Ends (1950) as Det. Mark Dixon
- Edge of Doom (1950) as Father Thomas Roth
- Sealed Cargo (1951) as Pat Bannon
- The Frogmen (1951) as Jake Flannigan
- I Want You (1951) as Martin Greer
- Assignment – Paris! (1952) as Jimmy Race
- Elephant Walk (1954) as Dick Carver
- Duel in the Jungle (1954) as Scott Walters
- Three Hours to Kill (1954) as Jim Guthrie
- Smoke Signal (1955) as Brett Halliday
- Strange Lady in Town (1955) as Dr. Rourke O'Brien
- Screen Snapshots: Hollywood Goes a Fishin' (1956 short) as himself
- Comanche (1956) as Jim Read
- While the City Sleeps (1956) as Edward Mobley
- Beyond a Reasonable Doubt (1956) as Tom Garrett
- Spring Reunion (1957) as Fred Davis
- Curse of the Demon (1957) as John Holden
- Zero Hour! (1957) as Lt. Ted Stryker
- The Fearmakers (1958) as Alan Eaton
- Enchanted Island (1958) as Abner "Ab" Bedford
- The Crowded Sky (1960) as Dick Barnett.
- Madison Avenue (1961) as Clint Lorimer
- The Satan Bug (1965) as Gen. Williams
- In Harm's Way (1965) as Admiral Broderick
- Crack in the World (1965) as Dr. Stephen Sorenson
- Brainstorm (1965) as Cort Benson
- Town Tamer (1965) as Tom Rosser
- Berlin, Appointment for the Spies (1965) as Col. Lancaster
- The Loved One (1965) as Gen. Buck Brinkman
- Battle of the Bulge (1965) as Col. Pritchard
- Johnny Reno (1966) as Johnny Reno
- The Frozen Dead (1966) as Dr. Norberg
- Hot Rods to Hell (1967) as Tom Phillips
- Supercolpo da 7 miliardi (The Ten Million Dollar Grab) (1967) as George Kimmins
- The Cobra (1967) as Capt. Kelly
- No Diamonds for Ursula (1967) as Il gioielliere
- The Devil's Brigade (1968) as Brig. Gen. Walter Naylor
- The Failing of Raymond (1971, TV Movie) as Allan McDonald
- Innocent Bystanders (1972) as Blake
- Airport 1975 (1974) as Scott Freeman
- A Shadow in the Streets (1975, TV Movie) as Len Raeburn
- The First 36 Hours of Dr. Durant (1975 TV movie) as Dr. Hutchins
- Take a Hard Ride (1975) as Morgan
- The Last Tycoon (1976) as Red Ridingwood
- The Last Hurrah (1977 TV movie) as Roger Shanley
- Good Guys Wear Black (1978) as Edgar Harolds
- Born Again (1978) as Tom Phillips
- A Tree, a Rock, a Cloud (1978 short)
- The Pilot (1980) as Randolph Evers
- Ike: The War Years (1980 TV movie) as General George C. Marshall
- Prince Jack (1985) as The Cardinal (final film role)

== Partial television credits ==
| Year | Program | Episode | Role |
|---|---|---|---|
| 1963 | The Twilight Zone | "No Time Like the Past" | Paul Driscoll |
| 1969 | Family Affair | "Wings Of An Angel" | Harv Mullen |
| 1971 | Night Gallery | "The Different Ones" | Paul Koch |
| 1978 | The Hardy Boys | "Assault on the Tower" | Townley |
| 1978 | The American Girls | "The Cancelled Czech" | Phillips |
| 1982 | The Love Boat | "Command Performance/Hyde and Seek/Sketchy Love" | Mr. Paul Gerber |
| 1982 | Falcon Crest | "The Candidate" and "Deliberate Disclosure" | Elliot McKay |

== Radio credits ==
| Year | Program | Episode | Ref. |
|---|---|---|---|
| 1948 | Lux Radio Theatre | "The Luck of the Irish" | |
| 1952–1954 | I Was a Communist for the FBI | Various episodes | |
| 1952 | Hallmark Playhouse | "The Secret Road" | |
| 1953 | Theater of Stars | "The Token" | |
