= Jerry Hausner =

American radio and television actor (1909–1993)

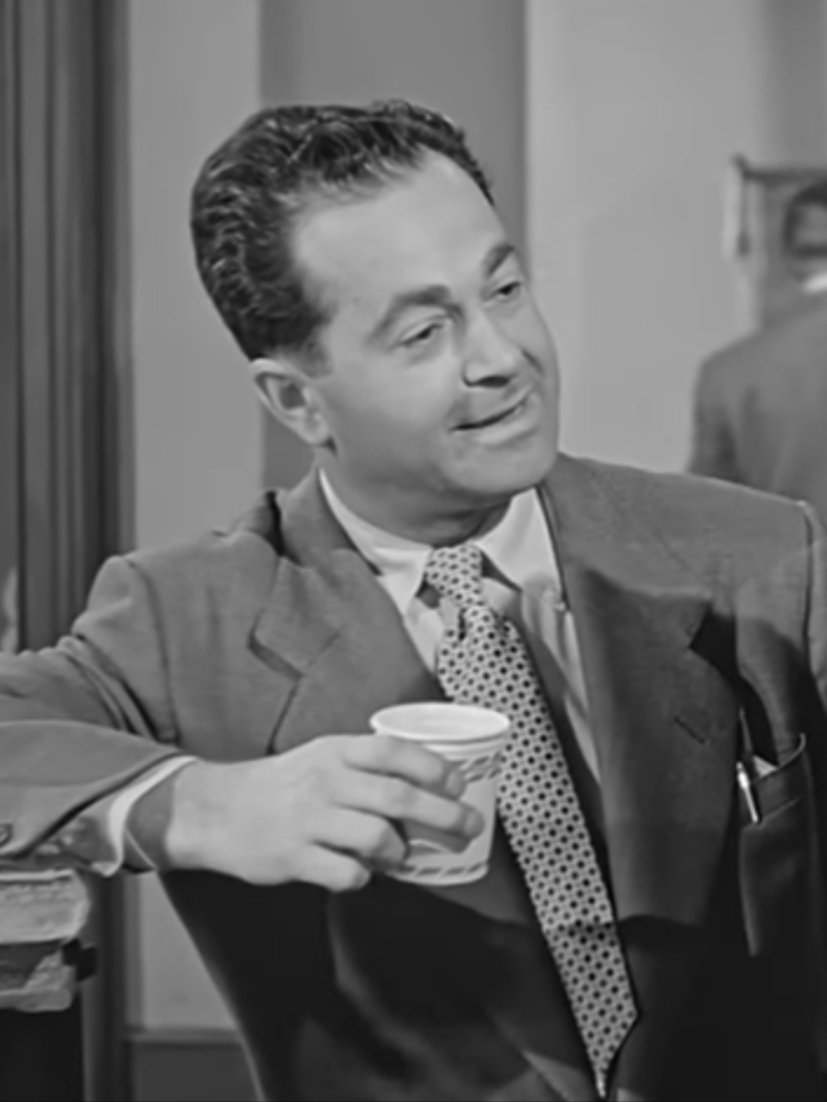
- Jerry Hausner in The Bigamist (1953)
- Born: James Bernard Hausner; May 20, 1909; Cleveland, Ohio, U.S.
- Died: April 1, 1993 (aged 83); Los Angeles, California, U.S.
- Resting place: Forest Lawn Memorial Park, Hollywood Hills, California
- Occupation: Actor
- Years active: 1934–1975
- Spouse: Velma McCall

James Bernard Hausner (May 20, 1909 – April 1, 1993), known professionally as Jerry Hausner, was an American radio, film, and television actor, best known as Ricky Ricardo's agent in I Love Lucy and as the voice of Waldo in Mr. Magoo and several characters such as Hemlock Holmes, The Mole, Broodles and Itchy in The Dick Tracy Show (he had also worked as a dialogue director for both of these cartoons).

== Career ==
On Broadway Hausner had the role of Sammy Schmaltz in Queer People (1934). He also acted in stock theater and vaudeville before going into radio at WJAY in Cleveland, Ohio.

On radio, he was a regular on Blondie, The Jim Backus Show, The Judy Canova Show, Too Many Cooks, and Young Love.

Hausner appeared as a courier who summons the Roman emperor Nero to a meeting called by the Devil in the 1969 KCET television reading of Norman Corwin's 1938 radio play The Plot to Overthrow Christmas. He made guest appearances – in different roles – on The Patty Duke Show, He also provided special vocal effects in the 1975 animated film Hugo the Hippo.

Hausner was notable as the French tavern proprietor who, in the final scene of Stanley Kubrick's Paths of Glory, introduces the German singer, played by Christiane Susanne Harlan, the future Mrs. Christiane Kubrick.

Jerry Hausner provided the cricket sounds on Hoagy Carmichael's recording of Casanova Cricket. Hausner wrote that he was to be paid $50 for the work but never received payment.

== Personal life ==
He was married to Velma McCall Hausner (1904 - 1978).

== Death ==
Hausner died of heart failure on April 1, 1993, in Cedars-Sinai Medical Center in Los Angeles, California. He was 83 years old and was buried in Forest Lawn Memorial Park (Hollywood Hills).

== Filmography ==
- Syncopation (1942) – Cockeye (uncredited)
- Two Weeks to Live (1943) – Reporter (uncredited)
- All My Sons (1948) – Halliday (uncredited)
- Abandoned (1949) – Hospital Orderly (uncredited)
- Never Fear (1949) – Mr. Brownlee
- Woman in Hiding (1950) – Conventioneer (uncredited)
- Outrage (1950) – Mr. Denker
- To Please a Lady (1950) – Spotter in Husing's Booth (uncredited)
- The Jackpot (1950) – Al Stern (uncredited)
- Three Husbands (1950) – Joe, the Bartender (uncredited)
- You're in the Navy Now (1951) – Crew Member (uncredited)
- Fourteen Hours (1951) – Reporter (uncredited)
- Ma and Pa Kettle Back on the Farm (1951) – Steve (uncredited)
- Hard, Fast and Beautiful (1951) – Bit Role (uncredited)
- Behave Yourself! (1951) – Taxi Driver (uncredited)
- On the Loose (1951) – Gus, Red Mill Waiter (uncredited)
- The Lady Pays Off (1951) – Cab Driver (uncredited)
- The Stooge (1951) – Al Borden (uncredited)
- Two Tickets to Broadway (1951) – Agent Punching Conway (uncredited)
- Sailor Beware (1952) – Corpsman (uncredited)
- Just This Once (1952) – Stanley Worth
- The Atomic City (1952) – John Pattiz
- You for Me (1952) – Patient (uncredited)
- Off Limits (1952) – Fishy
- The Affairs of Dobie Gillis (1953) – Al, Booking Agent (uncredited)
- Half a Hero (1953) – George Faring (uncredited)
- The Bigamist (1953) – Roy Esterly (uncredited)
- Lucky Me (1954) – Street Pitchman (uncredited)
- Private Hell 36 (1954) – Hausner, Nightclub Owner
- Phffft (1954) – Steve (uncredited)
- The Naked Street (1955) – Louie
- Paths of Glory (1957) – Café Proprietor
- Wake Me When It's Over (1960) – Military Desk Sergeant (uncredited)
- Let's Make Love (1960) – Counterman (uncredited)
- Wives and Lovers (1963) – Sardi's Waiter (uncredited)
- Who's Minding the Store? (1963) – Smith
- The Patsy (1964) – Floorman (uncredited)
- Patty Duke Show (1965) – T.J. Blodgett, Postman
- The Monkees (1967) – Fight Announcer in S1:E20, "Monkees in the Ring"
- Room 222 (1969) Ticket Agent in S1:E24 "The New Boy"
- Hugo the Hippo (1975) – Special Vocal Effects (voice)
