= Outrage (1950 film) =

1950 film by Ida Lupino

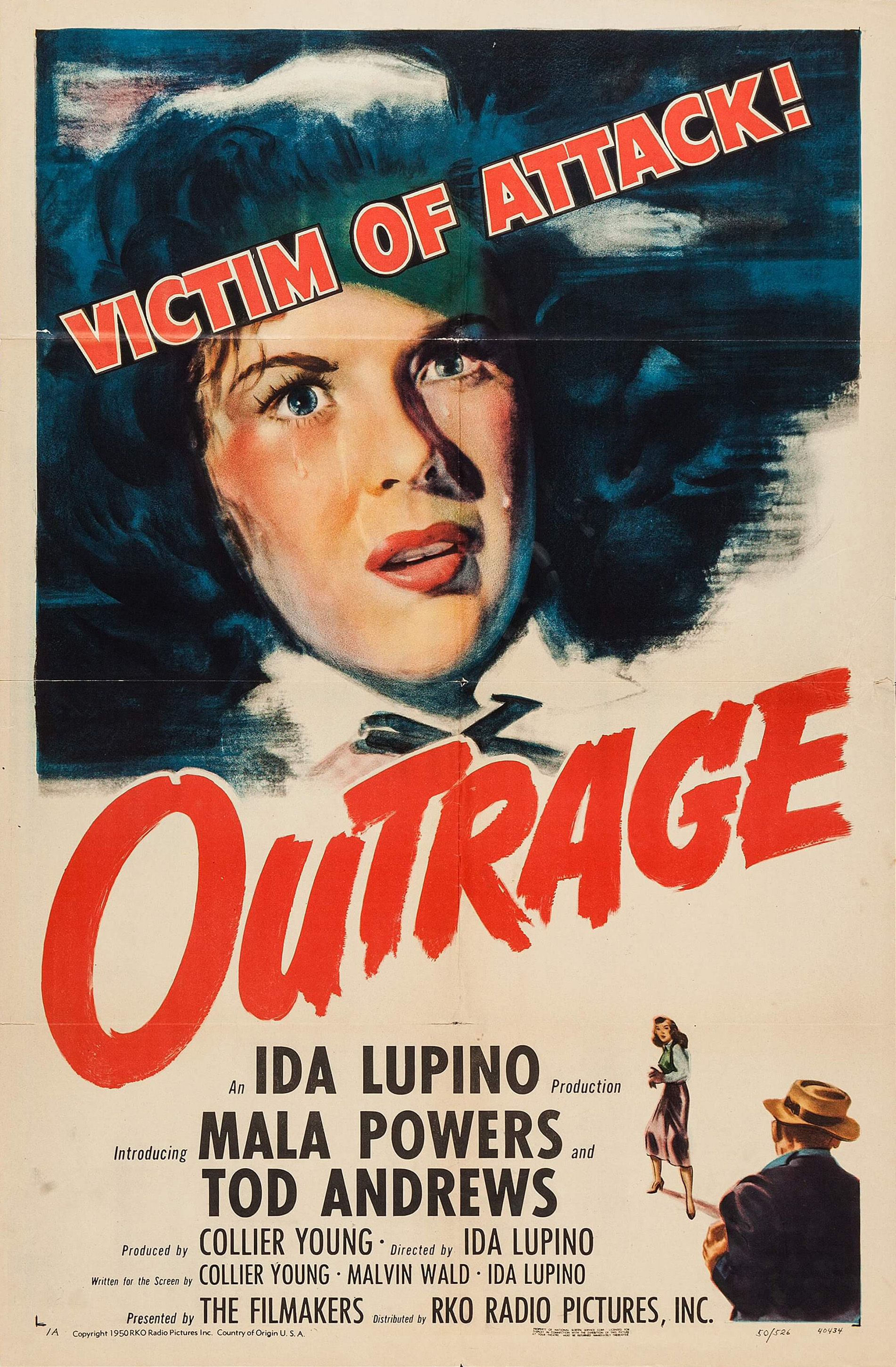
- Theatrical release poster
- Directed by: Ida Lupino
- Written by: Ida Lupino; Malvin Wald; Collier Young
- Produced by: Collier Young; Malvin Wald
- Starring: Mala Powers; Tod Andrews; Robert Clarke
- Cinematography: Louis Clyde Stoumen; Archie Stout
- Edited by: Harvey Manger
- Music by: Paul Sawtell
- Production company: The Filmakers
- Distributed by: RKO Radio Pictures
- Release dates: October 14, 1950 (New York); January 10, 1951 (Los Angeles)
- Running time: 75 minutes
- Country: United States
- Language: English

Outrage is a 1950 black-and-white crime-drama film directed by Ida Lupino, who also cowrote the script along with the producers Malvin Wald and Collier Young. It stars Mala Powers in her first leading role.

Outrage is the third film produced by Lupino and Young's independent The Filmakers Inc. Initially receiving mixed reviews, it has been critically reevaluated over the years. In 2020, Outrage was selected for preservation in the National Film Registry by the Library of Congress as being "culturally historically or aesthetically significant".

== Plot ==
Ann Walton is a young bookkeeper whose steady boyfriend Jim Owens announces that he has received a raise, prompting the young couple to finally become engaged and inform Ann's parents. A man who works at the concession stand where Ann works takes an interest in her and tries to flirt with her, but she is uninterested.

Staying late at work one night, Ann notices that she is being stalked and tries to flee from the man who is following her. She is unable to hide and is eventually caught and raped by the man who works the concession stand. Ann is only able to recall having seen a scar on the man's neck.

Returning home, Ann's parents learn what happened and contact the police. Though the police and Ann's family, friends and fiancé are supportive, she believes that the neighbors are gossiping about her and that Jim can no longer see her as she once was. After being forced to review a police lineup of men with scars, none of whom she can identify as her attacker, Ann runs away, taking the bus to Los Angeles on a whim.

While the bus driver is on a break, Ann overhears on the radio that her parents are looking for her and have identified her as the victim of a rape. Ann runs away from the bus and sprains her ankle where she is found by a man named Rev. Bruce Ferguson. He takes Ann to an orange farm belonging to his friends the Harrisons. He does his best to help Ann, eventually securing her a job as a bookkeeper for the Harrisons. Ann and Ferguson grow increasingly close. When Ferguson asks her to attend a local festival, she agrees, but when another attendee pressures her for a kiss, she is reminded of her rape and attacks him with a wrench.

Ann is forced to stand trial, but Ferguson wants to determine why she snapped and learns of her rape. He persuades the judge to commute her sentence, and instead she sees a psychiatrist for a year. After the psychiatric treatment has concluded, Ann wants to stay with Ferguson and pursue a relationship with him, but he advises her to face life's challenges and encourages her to return to her old life and to Jim.

== Cast ==
- Mala Powers as Ann Walton
- Tod Andrews as Rev. Bruce Ferguson
- Robert Clarke as Jim Owens
- Raymond Bond as Eric Walton
- Lilian Hamilton as Mrs. Walton
- Rita Lupino as Stella Carter
- Hal March as Det. Sgt. Hendrix
- Kenneth Patterson as Tom Harrison
- Jerry Paris as Frank Marini
- Angela Clarke as Madge Harrison
- Roy Engel as Sheriff Charlie Hanlon
- Lovyss Bradley as Mrs. Miller
- Robin Camp as Shoeshine Boy
- William Challee as Lee Wilkins
- Tristram Coffin as Judge McKenzie

== Production ==
Outrage, the first starring film role for Mala Powers, was remarkable as only the second post-Code Hollywood film to deal with the issue of rape, following Johnny Belinda (1948).

== Reception ==
In a contemporary review for The New York Times, critic A. H. Weiler wrote:

Credit Ida Lupino and her associates in The Filmakers with restraint and a modicum of courage in jousting with another social problem in "Outrage." As in last year's "Not Wanted," when Miss Lupino and some other movie-makers tackled the doleful case of the unwed mother, the actress—in the more important roles of co-scenarist and director—is equally forthright in her approach to rape and its tragic aftermath. But the drama ... is an indictment which loses a great deal of its effect by lapsing into run-of-the-mill plot lines. Its preachment is indeed honorable, but its execution lacks punch and conviction. ... Miss Lupino and company, in short, are pointing—in good taste—to a social blight. But they are merely doing just that and nothing more.

In critic Philip K. Scheuer's review of the film for the Los Angeles Times, he commented on The Filmakers' approach to featuring social issues:

In three movies the trio have now evidenced a willingness to develop new personalities (earlier, Sally Forrest and Keefe Brasselle) and also to tackle raw and violent emotions; technically, they reveal an encouraging awareness of the possibilities in the sight-sound medium. They have also shown what critics call courage in their choice of themes, but as one of the fraternity I feel the choices could have been less uniformly unattractive and depressing. In ''Not Wanted" it was an unwed mother involved in delinquency; in "Never Fear,"' polio. Here we have rape and its tragic aftermath. I do not quarrel with the pertinence of these subjects to our lives today, but rather with the treatment of them, for they lack that which I can only describe as a philosophical maturity. But then, the Filmakers are young and eager, they have talent and they are not afraid to use it. Such a combination would be salutary in Hollywood at any time; it is especially so now. And maturity will come.
