= James Anderson (filmmaker) =

American filmmaker, born 1902

- Born: November 6, 1902; Springfield, Massachusetts, United States
- Died: November 26, 1960 (aged 58); Los Angeles, California, United States
- Occupation: Assistant director
- Years active: 1930-1954

James Anderson (November 6, 1902 – November 26, 1960) was an American assistant director during the 1930s, 1940s and 1950s. In his twenty-five year career, Anderson worked on almost 75 pictures. He is sometimes confused with James K. Anderson, the actor, because their careers overlapped. He was also known as James A. Anderson or James H. Anderson.

Anderson began his career in film as an actor with a featured role in the silent era, in 1925's The Freshman, starring Harold Lloyd. After appearing in several silent films, with the advent of sound he moved behind the camera, where he was a perennial assistant director. He would spend almost his entire career with RKO Radio Pictures, from their inception in 1929 through 1949.

As an assistant director he would work with such famous directors as George Archainbaud, William A. Wellman, Walter Lang, Garson Kanin, Dorothy Arzner, Leo McCarey, and Ida Lupino. Late in his career he would also work as a unit or production manager on several films, including the classic Mr. Blandings Builds His Dream House in 1948. His final film credit would be on the small screen, as the assistant director and production manager for the 1957 episode "The Mothers", on Lupino's television series, Mr. Adams & Eve. Anderson died on November 26, 1960, in Los Angeles, California.

== Filmography ==
(as per AFI's database)

Year	Title	Role	Notes
1925	The Freshman	Actor - "Chester A. 'Chet' Trask"	
1926	The College Boob	Actor - "Horatio Winston, Jr."	
1926	Flying High	Actor - "Carson"	
1927	Butterflies in the Rain	Actor - "Dennis Carteret"	
1928	Fleetwing	Actor - "Mansoni"	
1930	The Runaway Bride	Assistant director	
1931	The Sin Ship	Assistant director	
1931	The Public Defender	Assistant director	
1931	Secret Service	Assistant director	
1931	Young Donovan's Kid	Assistant director	
1932	The Lost Squadron	Assistant director	
1932	The Conquerors	Assistant director	
1932	Hell's Highway	Assistant director	
1932	Is My Face Red?	Assistant director	
1932	The Roadhouse Murder	Assistant director	
1933	Chance at Heaven	Assistant director	
1933	No Other Woman	Assistant director	
1933	No Marriage Ties	Assistant director	
1934	Man of Two Worlds	Assistant director	
1935	Hooray for Love	Assistant director	
1935	A Dog of Flanders	Assistant director	
1935	Star of Midnight	Assistant director	
1935	In Person	Assistant director	
1936	Yellow Dust	Assistant director	
1936	Mummy's Boys	Assistant director	
1936	The Last Outlaw	Assistant director	
1936	Special Investigator	Assistant director	
1937	We Who Are About to Die	Assistant director	
1937	Criminal Lawyer	Assistant director	
1937	New Faces of 1937	Assistant director	
1937	Stage Door	Assistant director	
1938	Having Wonderful Time	Assistant director	
1938	Tarnished Angel	Assistant director	
1938	Mother Carey's Chickens	Assistant director	
1938	Room Service	Assistant director	
1939	Nurse Edith Cavell	Assistant director	
1939	Love Affair	Assistant director	
1939	Fixer Dugan	Assistant director	
1939	Reno	Assistant director	
1939	Three Sons	Assistant director	
1939	The Girl and the Gambler	Assistant director	
1940	Mexican Spitfire	Assistant director	
1940	My Favorite Wife	Assistant director	
1940	Dance, Girl, Dance	Assistant director	
1941	A Girl, a Guy and a Gob	Assistant director	
1942	Once Upon a Honeymoon	Assistant director	
1942	Highways by Night	Assistant director	
1942	Joan of Paris	Assistant director	
1942	My Favorite Spy	Assistant director	
1946	Crack-Up	Assistant director	
1946	Dick Tracy vs. Cueball	Assistant director	
1946	The Falcon's Alibi	Assistant director	
1946	Lady Luck	Assistant director	
1946	Nocturne	Assistant director	
1947	Trail Street	Assistant director	
1947	Out of the Past	Unit manager	
1948	Mr. Blandings Builds His Dream House	Unit manager	
1949	Adventure in Baltimore	Assistant director	
1949	They Live by Night	Production manager	
1950	Borderline	Assistant director	
1950	Never Fear	Assistant director	
1950	Outrage	Assistant director	
1951	Hard, Fast and Beautiful	Assistant director	
1951	On the Loose	Assistant director	
1953	The Bigamist	Production manager	
1953	The Hitch-Hiker	Assistant to producer	
1953	Main Street to Broadway	Assistant director	
1954	Private Hell 36	Assistant director, production manager	
1955	Mad at the World	Associate producer	
1956	Huk!	Production manager	
