= Hard, Fast and Beautiful =

1951 film

- Film poster
- Directed by: Ida Lupino; James Anderson (assistant)
- Screenplay by: Martha Wilkerson
- Based on: American Girl (novel) by John R. Tunis
- Produced by: Norman A. Cook; Collier Young
- Starring: Claire Trevor; Sally Forrest
- Cinematography: Archie Stout
- Edited by: George C. Shrader; William H. Ziegler
- Music by: Roy Webb
- Distributed by: RKO Radio Pictures
- Release dates: May 23, 1951 (San Francisco); June 30, 1951 (New York)
- Running time: 78 minutes
- Country: United States
- Language: English

Hard, Fast and Beautiful is a 1951 American drama film directed by Ida Lupino and starring Claire Trevor. It is loosely based on the 1930 novel American Girl by sports-fiction author John R. Tunis, which was an unflattering and thinly veiled fictionalization of the life of the tennis star Helen Wills Moody.

== Plot ==
Florence Farley, a tennis prodigy from Santa Monica, California, is torn between fulfilling the dreams of her ambitious mother Millie, who has planned her tennis career, or her own dreams of being with the man whom she loves.

Florence has a chance meeting with Gordon McKay, the nephew of a wealthy town figure. Invited to play tennis at the local country club, she defeats him easily. Her prowess at the game causes J.R. Carpenter, the country club's manager, to offer Florence a membership there, plus a trip to Philadelphia to compete for the national junior championship.

Her scheming, social-climbing mother Millie manages to include herself on the trip, leaving her ill husband Will behind. She flirts with Florence's new coach Fletcher Locke and accepts money and gifts, which could endanger her daughter's amateur status. When Millie realizes that Gordon is not wealthy, she discourages Florence from entertaining the idea of marrying him.

After winning at Forest Hills, an increasingly unhappy Florence wants to retire from tennis and get married. Her father, on his death bed, scolds Millie for looking out for her own interests rather than those of their girl. Florence wins the Wimbledon women's singles title, then abruptly quits the game, announcing her impending marriage to Gordon and leaving her mother a forlorn figure on the sideline.

== Cast ==
- Claire Trevor as Millie Farley
- Sally Forrest as Florence Farley
- Carleton G. Young as Fletcher Locke
- Robert Clarke as Gordon McKay
- Kenneth Patterson as Will Farley
- Marcella Cisney as Miss Martin
- Joseph Kearns as J.R. Carpenter
- William Hudson as Interne
- George Fisher as Announcer

== Production ==
The film had two working titles, Mother of a Champion and Loving Cup, before it was titled Hard, Fast and Beautiful.

Sally Forrest was borrowed from MGM for the film. She had starred in two previous Ida Lupino films, Not Wanted and Never Fear (both 1949). According to a Hollywood Reporter news article, technical advisor Eleanor Tennant coached Forrest for her tennis-playing scenes.

Most of the film was shot at the West Side Tennis Tennis Club in Forest Hills, Queens, New York and in North Hollywood, California. Archival footage of tennis matches at Forest Hills and Wimbledon was included in the film.

The film was Lupino's third as a director and was co-produced by The Filmakers, the company that she had founded with her husband, producer Collier Young. The film cost less than $300,000 to produce. Lupino and actor Robert Ryan make a few cameos as tennis-match spectators.

The world premiere of Hard, Fast and Beautiful took place in San Francisco, California on May 23, 1951.

== Reception ==
In a contemporary review for The New York Times, critic Bosley Crowther wrote: "The script ... is a trite and foolish thing. It simply recounts the quick parabola that a girl tennis player describes in becoming a tennis champion and then chucking it all for love. And it is played with such lack of authority by everyone in the cast that it doesn't even carry the satisfaction that a well-acted romance might have. Under Miss Lupino's direction, Sally Forrest is a silly, callow child, given to such tedious explosions as 'Wouldn't that be WONDERFUL!' and 'Gee!'"

Film Bulletin wrote: "Hard Fast and Beautiful is a modest, unpretentious endeavor from Filmakers ... Like the previous attractions in this outfit’s short history (Not Wanted and Outrage) this one is designed to get over the hump by means of special exploitation. The names are not strong, but the performances to a man, are degrees above above [sic] the average found in a production costing less than $300,000. The gimmick lies in the story, a clever combination of misguided mother love and an exposé of the amateur tennis business. The tennis scenes pack more excitement than one might expect...The finish is rather lame, the girl champion’s belated awakening to the unscrupulous deals put over by her mother being not especially convincing."

A 1951 Harrison’s Reports article explained: "This is a tennis picture and, as such, should appeal strongly to the tennis fans, but it is doubtful whether those who are not especially interested in the game will derive much pleasure out of it, particularly since the story pits a mother’s ambition for worldly goods against her daughters’s [sic] sincerity in the game, as well as her love for a young man. It is not pleasant to see a grasping mother profiteering on her daughter’s fame. The action in the tennis sequences are so realistic that one is made to feel as if he is watching the playing of a real game, not a prearranged one. No fault can be found with the direction and acting. The photography is a treat to the eye."

== Box office ==
Hard, Fast and Beautiful earned $14,000 during its first week in San Francisco and $25,000 for its first week in New York. A report in Motion Picture Herald stated that box-office receipts were far below average in the Chicago market.

According to a May 30, 1951 Variety article: "Despite big bally plus personals by Jane Greer, Robert Ryan, William Bendix, Pat O’Brien, Tony Martin and Harry Crocker, among others Hard, Fast and Beautiful is failing to keep up to opening day pace at Golden Gate. It equaled house record that day, and still will come in with smooth session, if not smash."
