= The Hitch-Hiker =

1953 film by Ida Lupino

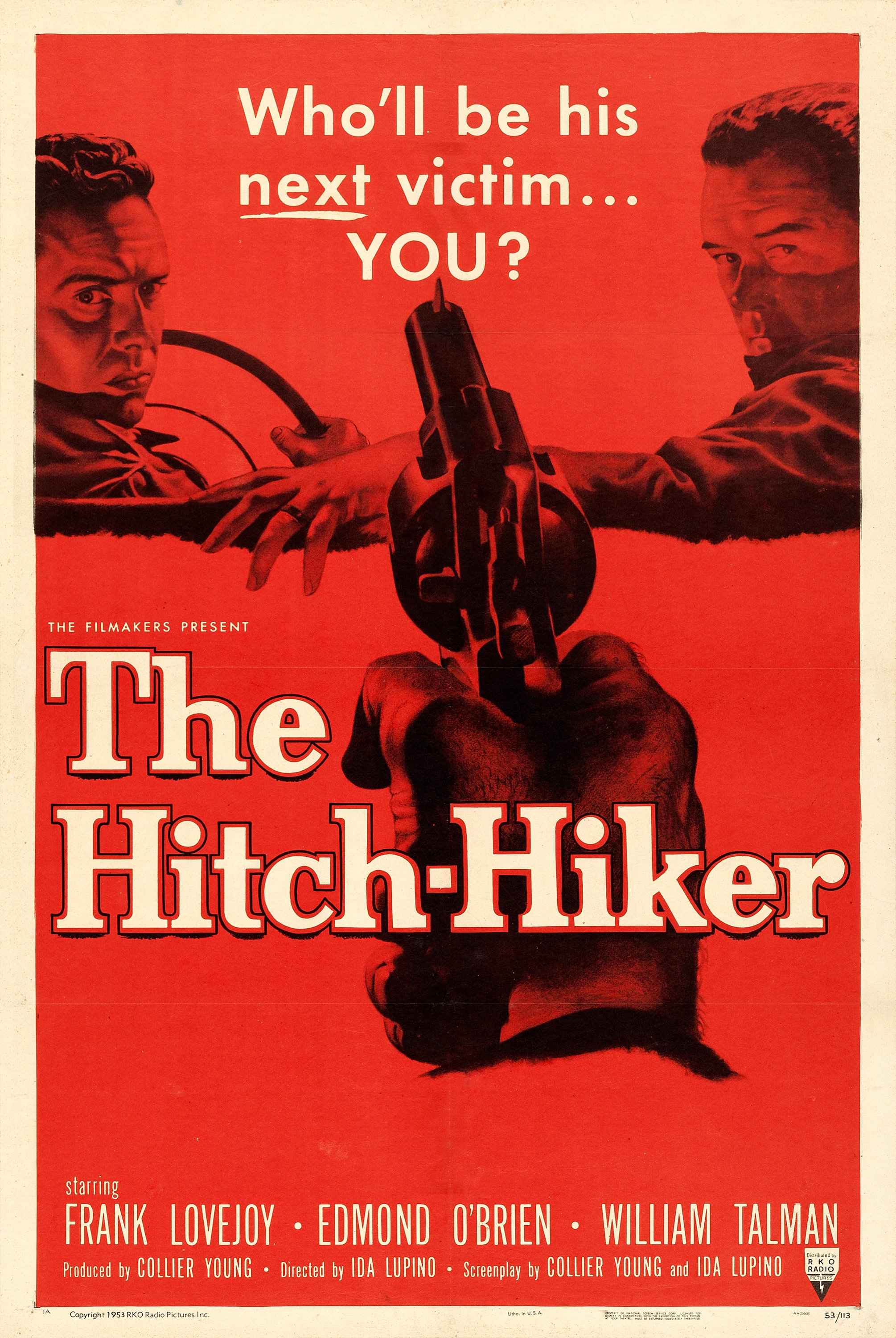
- Theatrical release poster
- Directed by: Ida Lupino
- Screenplay by: Ida Lupino; Collier Young
- Produced by: Collier Young
- Starring: Edmond O'Brien; Frank Lovejoy; William Talman
- Cinematography: Nicholas Musuraca
- Edited by: Douglas Stewart
- Music by: Leith Stevens
- Production company: The Filmakers Inc.
- Distributed by: RKO Radio Pictures
- Release dates: March 20, 1953 (Boston); March 21, 1953 (U.S.)
- Running time: 71 minutes
- Country: United States
- Language: English

The Hitch-Hiker full film

The Hitch-Hiker is a 1953 American thriller film noir directed by Ida Lupino, who co-wrote it with her former husband Collier Young, and starring Edmond O'Brien, William Talman and Frank Lovejoy. Based on the 1950 killing spree of Billy Cook, the film follows two friends who are taken hostage by a serial-murdering hitchhiker during an automobile trip to Mexico.

Produced independently and distributed by RKO Pictures, The Hitch-Hiker was the first mainstream-released American film of its type directed by a woman. It was selected in 1998 for preservation in the United States National Film Registry as being "culturally, historically or aesthetically significant." The film is in the public domain in the United States.

== Plot ==
In California, two friends, Roy Collins and Gilbert Bowen, leave one evening on a planned fishing trip to San Felipe, Baja California, Mexico. They cross the Mexico–United States border at Calexico-Mexicali and continue on through the night. They pick up hitchhiker Emmett Myers, who pulls a gun and holds them hostage. Myers is a serial killer who has already kidnapped and murdered three other motorists in similar fashion. He forces them to drive him through the Baja California desert towards Santa Rosalía, Baja California Sur, where he plans to escape a police dragnet by taking a ferry across the Gulf of California to Guaymas. To avoid law enforcement, he orders the pair to drive at night.

Collins and Bowen comply. In Mexico, Myers sadistically terrorizes the pair—at one point forcing Bowen to shoot a tin can out of Collins' hand with a game rifle—and revels in the ineffective attempts by Mexican law enforcement to catch him using checkpoints. After a tense moment while buying food, they stop for the night. Collins and Bowen discuss their plans to escape, and agree that they must only act at the right time or they will be killed.

The next morning, the car radio fails, and Myers slugs Collins in the head for breaking it, so Bowen must drive. Meanwhile, police investigators learn the three are together and deduce where Myers is heading. At a gas station, Myers kills a dog, while Bowen leaves his wedding ring for the police to find. Overnight, Collins and Bowen attempt to escape, but Collins injures his ankle, and the pair are recaptured. As the police investigation proceeds, supervisors release false information to trick Myers, which seems to work. Later, when the car is damaged, Myers forces the group to continue on foot at gunpoint, and taunts them for missing opportunities to escape even if it would mean the other would be killed.

Collins, Bowen, and Myers reach Santa Rosalía and head to a bar, where Myers tries to conceal his identity and find an English speaking local. Learning the regular ferry to Guaymas has burned, Myers pays a fisherman to take him there instead. However, as the threesome prepare to leave, a local resident recognizes Myers and alerts the authorities, who deploy to catch him at the pier. After a shootout and scuffle, Myers is subdued and Collins and Bowen are freed unharmed.

== Cast ==
Credits from the AFI Catalog of Feature Films:

- Edmond O'Brien as Roy Collins
- Frank Lovejoy as Gilbert Bowen
- William Talman as Emmett Myers
- José Torvay as Captain Alvarado
- Jean Del Val as Inspector General
- Clark Howat as Government Agent
- Natividad Vacío as Jose
- Rodney Bell as William Johnson
- Nacho Galindo as Proprietor
- Martin Garralaga as Bartender
- Wendell Niles as Himself (Radio Announcer)

== Production ==
=== Background ===
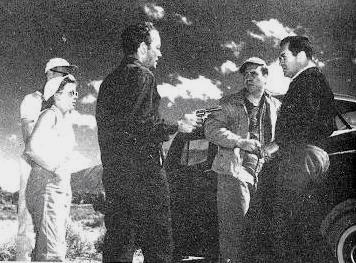
Ida Lupino (left) directing The Hitch-Hiker

The Hitch-Hiker was based on the 1950 killing spree of Billy Cook who, posing as a hitchhiker, murdered a family of five, kidnapped a Riverside County Sheriff's Department deputy and abandoned him in a desert (the deputy survived), and killed a traveling salesman, before attempting to flee to Mexico by taking two men on a hunting trip hostage and forcing them to drive him to Santa Rosalía. There, Cook was identified and apprehended by local police without incident. As Mexico then lacked a formal extradition treaty with the United States, Mexican authorities "extradited" him back to the U.S. by physically pushing him over the border, where he was taken into custody by waiting American law enforcement. Cook was tried, convicted, and received the death penalty. On December 12, 1952, Cook was executed in the gas chamber at San Quentin State Prison in California.

=== Writing ===
The film was written by Lupino and her former husband Collier Young, based on a story by Daniel Mainwaring, which was adapted by Robert L. Joseph. Mainwaring did not receive a screen credit because of his Hollywood blacklisting.

Lupino interviewed the two prospectors whom Billy Cook had held hostage, and got releases from them and from Cook as well, so that she could integrate parts of Cook's life into the script. To appease the censors at the Hays Office, however, she reduced the number of deaths to three.

=== Filming ===
The Hitch-Hiker went into independent production on June 24, 1952, and wrapped in late July. The director of photography was RKO Pictures regular Nicholas Musuraca. Location shooting took place in the Alabama Hills near Lone Pine and Big Pine, California. Working titles for the film were "The Difference" and "The Persuader".

Lupino was a noted actress who began directing when Elmer Clifton got sick and couldn't finish the film he was directing for Filmakers Inc., the production company founded by Lupino and Young to make low-budget, issue-oriented movies. Lupino stepped in to finish the film and went on to direct her own projects. The Hitch-Hiker was her first hard-paced, fast-moving picture after four "women's" films about social issues.

The film is in the public domain.

== Release ==
The film was originally rejected by the British Board of Film Censors, but was passed X with cuts two months later. In 2005, it was passed uncut with a 12 certificate.

=== Box office ===
The Hitch-Hiker premiered in Boston on March 20, 1953, to little fanfare and immediately went into general release. The theatrical poster used the phrase "Who'll be his next victim...you?" while the full-size newspaper ad read: "When was the last time you gambled with death? It was the last time you picked up a stranger with an upraised thumb!"

=== Reception ===
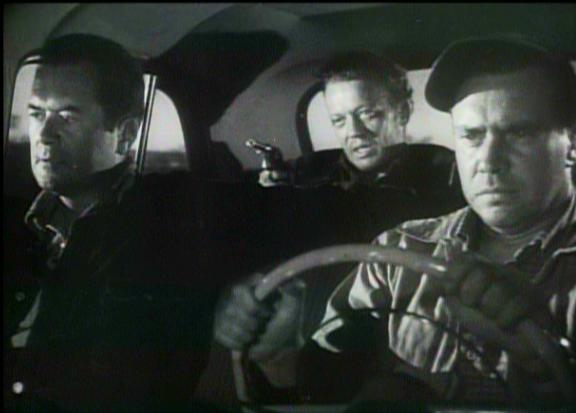
Frank Lovejoy, William Talman and Edmond O'Brien

The picture received mixed contemporary reviews, whereas later reviews are consistently positive.

The Philadelphia Inquirer said that "with nothing more than three able actors, a lot of rugged scenery and their own impressive talents as producers, authors and director, Collier Young and Ida Lupino have brewed a grim little chiller". The Inquirer critic praised the performances and said the film was "directed with masculine strength by the amazing Miss Lupino".

The New York Daily News gave the film three and a half of four stars, saying Lupino made "good and exciting use" of the real-life incident.

The New York Times called the film an "unrelenting but superficial study of abnormal psychology coupled with standard chase melodrama". Critic A. H. Weiler complimented the performances and Lupino's "brisk direction", but criticized the plot as excessively predictable.

The Detroit Free Press said that the film performed a public service by warning motorists about the dangers of picking up hitchhikers.

In 1992, critics Bob Porfiero and Alain Silver praised Lupino's use of shooting locations. They wrote, "The Hitch-Hiker's desert locale, although not so graphically dark as a cityscape at night, isolates the protagonists in a milieu as uninviting and potentially deadly as any in film noir."

In 2002 critic John Krewson lauded the work of Ida Lupino, and wrote,

As a screenwriter and director, Lupino had an eye for the emotional truth hidden within the taboo or mundane, making a series of B-styled pictures which featured sympathetic, honest portrayals of such controversial subjects as unmarried mothers, bigamy, and rape ... in The Hitch-Hiker, arguably Lupino's best film and the only true noir directed by a woman, two utterly average middle-class American men are held at gunpoint and slowly psychologically broken by a serial killer. In addition to her critical but compassionate sensibility, Lupino had a great filmmaker's eye, using the starkly beautiful street scenes in Not Wanted and the gorgeous, ever-present loneliness of empty highways in The Hitch-Hiker to set her characters apart.

In 2008 Time Out Film Guide wrote of the film,

Absolutely assured in her creation of the bleak, noir atmosphere – whether in the claustrophobic confines of the car, or lost in the arid expanses of the desert – Lupino never relaxes the tension for one moment. Yet her emotional sensitivity is also upfront: charting the changes in the menaced men's relationship as they bicker about how to deal with their captor, stressing that only through friendship can they survive. Taut, tough, and entirely without macho-glorification, it's a gem, with first-class performances from its three protagonists, deftly characterised without resort to cliché.

In January 2014, a restored 35mm print was premiered by the Film Noir Foundation at Noir City 12 at the Castro Theatre in San Francisco. On April 6, 2014 The Hitch-Hiker was shown again at the Egyptian Theatre in Hollywood. Mary Ann Anderson author of The Making of The Hitch-Hiker appeared at this event.

On the review aggregator website Rotten Tomatoes, 94% of 47 critics' reviews are positive. The website's consensus reads: "Simply and sturdily constructed, The Hitch-Hiker consistently derives genuine terror from a chillingly plausible scenario."

== See also ==
- List of films in the public domain in the United States
- The Hitcher (1986 film)
- The Bigamist (1953 film), also directed by Lupino in the same year.
