= Malvin Wald =

American screenwriter

- Publicity Photo of Malvin Wald
- Born: Malvin Daniel Wald; August 8, 1917
- Died: March 6, 2008 (aged 90)

Malvin Daniel Wald (August 8, 1917 – March 6, 2008) was an American screenwriter most famous for writing the 1948 police drama The Naked City, for which he was nominated for the Academy Award for Best Story. He wrote over 150 scripts for motion pictures and TV shows including Peter Gunn, Daktari, and Perry Mason. He also served with the Army Air Forces and taught screenwriting at the University of Southern California. He died at Sherman Oaks Hospital in Los Angeles from age-related causes at age 90.

== Filmography ==
=== Films ===
Year	Film	Credit	Notes
1941	Two in a Taxi	Written By	Co-Wrote Screenplay with "Howard J. Green" and "Morton Thompson"
1942	Ten Gentlemen from West Point	Story By	
1943	The Powers Girl	Screenplay By	
1943	The Underdog	Story By	Co-Wrote Story with "Lawrence E. Taylor"
1943	Jive Junction	Story By, Screenplay By	Co-Wrote Screenplay with "Irving Wallace" and "Walter Doniger"
1948	The Naked City	Story By, Screenplay By	Co-Wrote Screenplay with "Albert Maltz"
1948	Behind Locked Doors	Story By, Screenplay By	Co-Wrote Screenplay with "Eugene Ling"
1948	The Dark Past	Adaption By	
1949	The Undercover Man	Additional Dialogue	
1949	Not Wanted	Written By	Co-Wrote Screenplay with "Paul Jarrico" and "Ida Lupino"
1950	Outrage	Written By, Produced By	Co-Wrote Screenplay with "Ida Lupino" and "Collier Young"
1951	On The Loose	Story By, Associate Producer	Co-Wrote Story with "Collier Young"
1952	H.C. Andersen's Sagor	Screenplay By	
1954	Meet The Family	Screenplay By	Co-Wrote Screenplay with "Jack Jacobs"
1955	Battle Taxi	Story By, Screenplay By	Co-Wrote Story with "Art Arthur"
1957	Man On Fire	Story By	Co-Wrote Story with "Jack Jacobs"
1958	Street of Darkness	Written By	Co-Wrote Screenplay with "Maurice Tombragel"
1959	Al Capone		Co-Wrote Screenplay with "Henry F. Greenberg"
1959	The Boy Who Owned a Melephant	Story By	Short Film
1961	The Steel Claw	Screenplay By	Co-Wrote Screenplay with "George Montgomery" and "Ferde Grofé Jr."
1969	Venus In Furs	Screenplay By	
1979	In Search of Historic Jesus	Screenplay By	
1980	The Legend Of Sleepy Hollow	Screenplay By	Co-Wrote Screenplay with "Jack Jacobs" and "Thomas C. Chapman"

=== Television ===
Year	TV Series	Credit	Notes
1951	Hollywood Opening Night	Writer	1 Episode
1952–54	Fireside Theatre	Writer	2 Episodes
1953	Your Favorite Story	Writer	4 Episodes
1954	Lux Video Theatre	Writer	1 Episode
1954	Tales of Hans Anderson	Writer	1 Episode
1954	The Joe Palooka Story	Writer	1 Episode
1954	The Ray Milland Show	Writer	1 Episode
1955	Rheingold Theater	Writer	1 Episode
1955	The Millionaire	Writer	1 Episode
1955	Treasury Men in Action	Writer	1 Episode
1955	Jungle Jim	Writer	2 Episodes
1955	My Friend Flicka	Writer	2 Episodes
1955	Brave Eagle	Writer	2 Episodes
1956	The Alcoa Hour	Writer	1 Episode
1956	Screen Directors Playhouse	Writer	1 Episode
1956	Warner Bros. Presents	Writer	1 Episode
1956	Goodyear Playhouse	Writer	1 Episode
1956	Lassie	Writer	1 Episode
1956	Ethel Barrymore Theatre	Writer	1 Episode
1956	Judge Roy Bean	Writer	1 Episode
1957	West Point	Writer	1 Episode
1957	Cavalcade of America	Writer	1 Episode
1957	Wire Service	Writer	1 Episode
1957	Navy Log	Writer	1 Episode
1957	Playhouse 90	Writer	1 Episode
1957	The George Sanders Mystery Theater	Writer	1 Episode
1957	The Restless Gun	Writer	1 Episode
1957	Perry Mason	Writer	1 Episode
1957–58	The Silent Service	Writer	3 Episodes
1958	The Loretta Young Show	Writer	1 Episode
1958	Have Gun – Will Travel	Writer	1 Episode
1958	Climax!	Writer	2 Episodes
1958	Behind Closed Doors	Writer	1 Episode
1958	Peter Gunn	Writer	1 Episode
1958–60	Shirley Temple's Storybook	Writer	2 Episodes
1959–61	Lock-Up	Writer	2 Episodes
1960	Assignment: Underwater	Writer	1 Episode
1960–61	The Case of the Dangerous Robin	Writer	3 Episodes
1961	The Many Loves of Dobie Gillis	Writer	1 Episode
1962	Combat!	Writer	1 Episode
1962	The DuPont Show of the Week	Writer	1 Episode
1963	The Great Adventure	Writer	1 Episode
1966–68	Daktari	Writer, Associate Producer	16 Episodes
1967	Untamed Frontier	Writer	1 Episode
1969	The Mod Squad	Writer	1 Episode
1977–78	The Life and Times of Grizzly Adams	Writer	9 Episodes
1979	Greatest Heros of The Bible	Writer	1 Episode
1979	The Littlest Hobo	Writer	2 Episodes
