= Bannerline =

1951 film

- Film poster
- Directed by: Don Weis
- Written by: Charles Schnee
- Based on: the short story A Rose Is Not a Rose by Samson Raphaelson
- Produced by: Henry Berman
- Starring: Keefe Brasselle; Sally Forrest; Lionel Barrymore
- Cinematography: Harold Lipstein
- Edited by: Fredrick Y. Smith
- Music by: Rudolph G. Kopp
- Production company: Metro-Goldwyn-Mayer
- Distributed by: Loew's Inc.
- Release date: October 10, 1951 (Los Angeles)
- Running time: 87 minutes
- Country: United States
- Language: English
- Budget: $439,000
- Box office: $457,000

Bannerline is a 1951 American drama film directed by Don Weis. The film stars Keefe Brasselle, Sally Forrest and Lionel Barrymore.

== Plot ==
Young Mike Perrivale is an ambitious reporter for the Clarion who resents being assigned to cover only social events and small stories. He takes the advice of his girlfriend Richie Loomis to interview Hugo Trimble, a beloved local history teacher and community gadfly. Trimble, in the hospital and fatally ill, regrets that he was unable to expunge corruption from the city's government, which has been under the control of gangster Frankie Scarbine. To lift Trimble's spirits, Perrivale persuades his editor and publisher to publish several copies of the paper with a false front page proclaiming that Scarbine has been indicted and that the government leaders have resigned. Trimble is touched by the gesture but knows immediately that the page is a fake.

Soon after at a bar, Perrivale encounters Josh, a former reporter and alcoholic who now runs the Clarion presses. After several drinks, they decide to print the complete run of the next day's edition using the fake front page. Scarbine is enraged, although he has some admiration for Perrivale's nerve, and demands that Perrivale be fired. Perrivale considers how he might be able to influence a grand jury to investigate the city's corruption. After Mike is beaten by one of Scarbine's men, Josh and the publisher take their knowledge to the grand jury. Recovering from his injuries in the hospital, Mike learns that Scarbine's gang has left town and the mayor and city council have resigned. Finally receiving a promotion, Mike is able to marry Richie.

== Cast ==
- Keefe Brasselle as Mike Perrivale
- Sally Forrest as Richie Loomis
- Lionel Barrymore as Hugo Trimble
- Lewis Stone as Josh
- J. Carrol Naish as Frankie Scarbine
- Larry Keating as Stambaugh
- Spring Byington as Mrs. Loomis
- Warner Anderson as Roy
- Elisabeth Risdon as Mrs. Margaret Trimble
- Michael Ansara as Floyd
- John Morgan as Al

== Reception ==
Critic Philip K. Scheuer of the Los Angeles Times noted that Bannerline's focus on a principled crusader was similar to that of a contemporary MGM release, The People Against O'Hara, starring Spencer Tracy, writing: "Crusaders for a principle still have the courage to speak out on the screen, at any rate. ... 'Bannerline' is thinner than 'O'Hara,' but benefits by the same sort of slick scripting (Charles Schnee) and direction (Don Weis). Certainly it is well above B rating."

According to MGM records, the film earned $350,000 in the U.S. and Canada and $107,000 elsewhere, resulting in a loss to the studio of $203,000.
