= Don Weis =

American film and television director (1922–2000)

- Born: May 13, 1922; Milwaukee, Wisconsin, U.S.
- Died: July 26, 2000 (aged 78); Los Angeles, California, U.S.
- Resting place: Santa Fe National Cemetery
- Other name: Donald Weis
- Occupations: Film and television director
- Years active: 1942–1990
- Spouses: Dori Perlman (m. 1950; div. 1955) Rebecca Welles (m. 1961)
- Children: 2

Don Weis (May 13, 1922 – July 26, 2000) was an American film and television director.

== Biography ==
Weis was born in Milwaukee, Wisconsin to Emma (née Wiener; 1889–1971) and Meyer Weis (1886-1942). He graduated from the University of Southern California where he studied film. During World War II, Weis served in the Air Force as a film technician. After the war, he began working at MGM directing such films as Bannerline (1951), Just This Once (1952), You for Me (1952) and The Affairs of Dobie Gillis (1953).

Weis began directing for television in 1954 and worked on such series as M*A*S*H, Ironside, It Takes a Thief, Twilight Zone, Alfred Hitchcock Presents (1955), The Jane Wyman Show, The Andy Griffith Show, Happy Days, Starsky and Hutch, CHiPs, The Courtship of Eddie's Father, Hawaii Five-O, The Andros Targets, and The San Pedro Beach Bums, among others.

Weis won two Directors Guild of America Awards for television direction in 1956 and again in 1958.

Weis married Dori Perlman in 1950. They had two daughters together, Deborah and Pamela, before they divorced in 1955. Weis married actress Rebecca Welles on August 25, 1961, in Los Angeles. Welles had two daughters from a previous marriage, Elizabeth and actress Gwen Welles.

Weis died in Los Angeles in 2000, at 78 years of age. He was interred in Santa Fe, New Mexico at the Santa Fe National Cemetery. Rebecca was interred beside him after her death in 2017.

== Selected filmography ==
- Bannerline (1951)
- It's a Big Country: An American Anthology (1951)
- A Letter from a Soldier (1951 short)
- Just This Once (1952)
- You for Me (1952)
- I Love Melvin (1953)
- Remains to Be Seen (1953)
- A Slight Case of Larceny (1953)
- The Affairs of Dobie Gillis (1953)
- Half a Hero (1953)
- Skip Taylor (1953 TV movie)
- The Adventures of Hajji Baba (1954)
- Ride the High Iron (1956)
- Catch Me If You Can (1959)
- The Gene Krupa Story (1959)
- Rio (1961 TV movie)
- Critic's Choice (1963)
- Pajama Party (1964)
- Looking for Love (1964)
- Billie (1965)
- The Ghost in the Invisible Bikini (1966)
- The Longest Hundred Miles (1967 TV movie)
- The King's Pirate (1967)
- Did You Hear the One About the Traveling Saleslady? (1968)
- Now You See It, Now You Don't (film) (1968 TV movie)
- Zero to Sixty (1978)
- Back to the Planet of the Apes (1980 TV movie)
- The Munsters' Revenge (1981 TV movie)
