= On the Loose (1951 film) =

1951 film by Charles Lederer

- Directed by: Charles Lederer; James Anderson (assistant)
- Screenplay by: Dale Eunson; Katherine Albert
- Story by: Malvin Wald; Collier Young
- Produced by: Collier Young
- Starring: Joan Evans; Melvyn Douglas; Lynn Bari; Robert Arthur; Hugh O'Brian
- Cinematography: Archie Stout
- Edited by: Desmond Marquette
- Music by: Leigh Harline
- Production company: The Filmakers
- Distributed by: RKO Pictures
- Release date: October 11, 1951 (Los Angeles)
- Running time: 78 minutes
- Country: United States
- Language: English

On the Loose is a 1951 American drama film directed by Charles Lederer and starring Joan Evans, Melvyn Douglas, Lynn Bari, Robert Arthur and Hugh O'Brian. The screenplay was written by Evans' parents Dale Eunson and Katherine Albert from a story by Malvin Wald and Collier Young. The film was produced by Young for Ida Lupino's company The Filmakers and distributed by RKO Pictures. Its world premiere was held on October 12, 1951.

== Plot ==
Teenager Jill Bradley has become suicidal over recent events. Almost everything in her life has gone wrong since her birthday, which her parents Alice and Frank all but ignored. Alice scolds her for buying a new dress, and Frank allows her to keep it if she completes household chores, then becomes furious after Jill sneaks away to see boyfriend Larry Lindsay and returns home late, smelling of liquor.

Unjust rumors are spread about Jill's reputation and teachers treat her unfairly. Classmates refuse to come to her home when invited and one provokes a fight. Frank, called to the school, slaps Jill rather than trust her. Larry finds more trouble for her, ordering champagne at a restaurant under a false pretense, and then dumps her.

Frank tries to make amends with Jill by taking her to a roadhouse and dancing together. Larry enters and assumes that Frank is Jill's date, insulting her as a girl of low morals. Frank strikes Larry and is arrested for assault.

In court, although her father has advised her to keep silent, Jill testifies and explains Frank's motive, and the court acquits him. Frank and Alice vow to become better parents, and when they host a party for Jill, all of her old school friends attend.

== Cast ==
- Joan Evans as Jill Bradley
- Melvyn Douglas as Frank Bradley
- Lynn Bari as Alice Bradley
- Robert Arthur as Larry Lindsay
- Hugh O'Brian as Dr. Phillips
- Constance Hilton as Susan Tanner
- Mickey Kuhn as Bob Vance
- Susan Morrow as Catherine
- Lillian Hamilton as Miss Druten

== Production ==
Married screenwriters Dale Eunson and Katherine Albert wrote the screenplay as a vehicle for their daughter Joan Evans. They wrote parts for themselves as schoolteachers but do not appear in the finished film.

== Release ==
The world premiere of On the Loose was held on October 11, 1951 at the Orpheum and Hawaii theaters in Los Angeles as a double premiere with Slaughter Trail, another RKO Pictures release.

== Reception ==
In a contemporary review for the Los Angeles Times, critic Edwin Schallert wrote: "'On the Loose' might be called a nice little picture rather well made, and with purpose. ... The intent of the picture stands out rather obviously, and it is a little short of real cleverness, but later scenes dominated by Miss Evans have a moving quality."
