= Sally Forrest =

American actress (1928–2015)

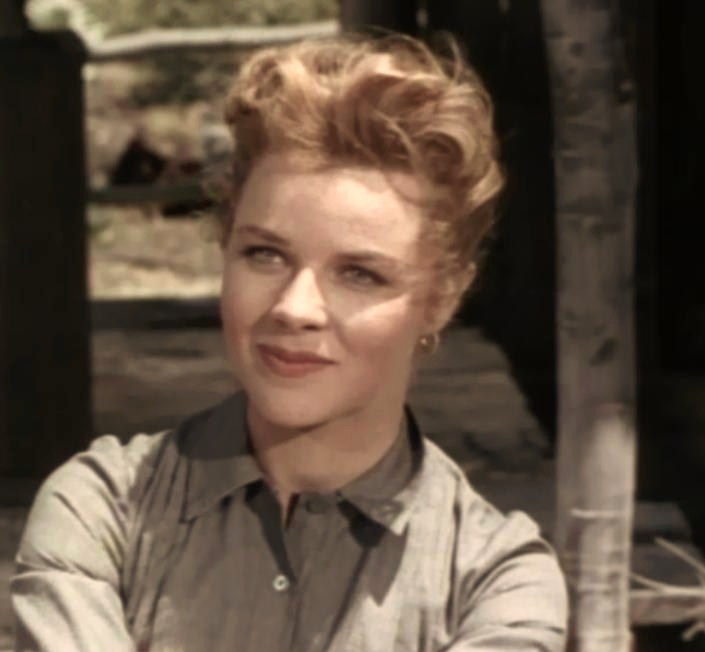
- Forrest in Vengeance Valley (1951)
- Born: Katherine Scully Feeney; May 28, 1928; San Diego, California, U.S.
- Died: March 15, 2015 (aged 86); Beverly Hills, California, U.S.
- Occupation: Actress
- Years active: 1946–1967
- Spouse: Milo O. Frank Jr (m. 1951; died 2004)

Sally Forrest (born Katherine Scully Feeney; May 28, 1928 – March 15, 2015) was an American film, stage and TV actress of the 1940s and 1950s. She studied dance from a young age and shortly out of high school was signed to a contract by Metro-Goldwyn-Mayer.

== Early life ==
Forrest was born in San Diego to Michael James Feeney and Marguerite (née Ellicott) Feeney. Her father was a U.S. Navy career officer who moved his family to various naval bases, finally settling in San Diego. He and his wife later became ballroom dancers and taught dance classes, where their daughter began learning her lifelong craft.

Forrest studied ballet, musical comedy, and tap dancing in schools on the Pacific coast. She sometimes worked as a model, and during World War II she danced in USO shows, wearing costumes that her mother had made.

== Career ==
Metro-Goldwyn-Mayer signed Forrest after a photographer submitted her picture and pointed out her tap-dancing ability. She began her film career in the 1940s as a chorus dancer in MGM musicals. She made her acting debut in Not Wanted (1949), written and produced by Ida Lupino. Its controversial subject of unwed motherhood was a raw and unsentimental view of a condition rarely explored by Hollywood at the time. Forrest starred in two more Lupino projects, Never Fear (1949) and Hard, Fast and Beautiful (1951), as well as other films noir, including Mystery Street (1950), directed by John Sturges, and the star-studded While the City Sleeps (1956), directed by Fritz Lang. Her musical background and training as a jazz and ballet dancer brought roles in the transitional musicals that rounded off the golden age of MGM; most notable Excuse My Dust and The Strip.

In 1953, after moving to New York with her husband, writer and producer Milo Frank (who was hired to be head of casting for CBS), her film work transitioned to theatre and TV. She starred on Broadway in The Seven Year Itch (1952), and appeared in major stage productions of Damn Yankees, Bus Stop, As You Like It and No No Nanette. Later she returned to Hollywood and continued working at RKO and Columbia Pictures. Her final film was RKO's While the City Sleeps in 1956, a film noir co-starring Dana Andrews, Rhonda Fleming, Vincent Price and her frequent collaborator Ida Lupino.

== Personal life ==
Forrest married her agent, Milo Frank, in Hollywood on August 5, 1951. They had no children and remained wed until his death in 2004.

Forrest and Frank were owners of the former Benedict Canyon home of Jean Harlow and Paul Bern on Easton Drive in Beverly Hills. They rented it to celebrity hair stylist Jay Sebring prior to his murder at the nearby home of Sharon Tate.

Forrest died of cancer on March 15, 2015, aged 86, at her home in Beverly Hills, California.

== Filmography ==
- Till the Clouds Roll By (uncredited showgirl) (1946) - Showgirl (uncredited)
- The Unfinished Dance (1947, chorus)
- Fiesta (1947, choreography assistant)
- Are You with It? (1948) - Dancer (uncredited)
- The Pirate (1948) - Fiesta Specialty Dancer (uncredited)
- The Kissing Bandit (1948, choreography assistant)
- Easter Parade (1948, uncredited dancer)
- Take Me Out to the Ball Game (1949) - Dancer at Wharf Party (uncredited)
- Mr. Belvedere Goes to College (1949) - Miss Cadwaller, Dr. Gibbs' Secretary (uncredited)
- Not Wanted (1949) - Sally Kelton
- Scene of the Crime (1949) - Minor Role (uncredited)
- Flame of Youth (1949) - Miss O'Brien (credited as Katherine Lang)
- Whirlpool (1949) - Minor Role (uncredited)
- Dancing in the Dark (1949) - Secretary (uncredited)
- Never Fear (AKA The Young Lovers) (1950) - Carol Williams
- Mystery Street (1950) - Grace Shanway
- My Blue Heaven (1950) - Minor Role (uncredited)
- Vengeance Valley (1951) - Lily
- Hard, Fast and Beautiful (1951) - Florence Farley
- Valentino (1951, choreography assistant)
- Excuse My Dust (1951) - Liz Bullitt
- The Strip (1951) - Jane Tafford
- The Metro-Goldwyn-Mayer Story (1951, MGM promotional documentary)
- Bannerline (1951) - Richie Loomis
- The Strange Door (1951) - Blanche de Maletroit
- Code Two (1953) - Mary Hartley
- Son of Sinbad (1955) - Ameer
- While the City Sleeps (1956) - Nancy Liggett
- Ride the High Iron (1956) - Elsie Vanders

== Television ==
- Schlitz Playhouse (TV series) "Barrow Street" (1952)
- Lux Video Theatre (TV series) (1953)
- The Ford Television Theatre (TV series) "The Life of the Party" (1953)
- Suspense (TV series) "The Darkest Night" (1953)
- Studio One in Hollywood (TV Series) "Letter of Love", "The Edge of Evil" (1953)
- The United States Steel Hour (TV Series) (1953)
- Armstrong Circle Theatre (TV Series) (1953)
- Screen Directors Playhouse (TV Series) "Want Ad Wedding" (1955)
- Front Row Center (TV Series) "The Teacher and Hector Hodge" (1955), "Guest in the House" (1956)
- Celebrity Playhouse (TV Series) "They Flee By Night" (1956)
- Ford Star Jubilee (TV variety show) "You're the Top" musical number (1956)
- The Red Skelton Hour (TV Series) "The Magic Shoes", "Valentine's Day Double Date" (1956)
- Climax! (TV Series) "Burst of Fire" (1958), "The Man Who Stole the Bible" (1957), "Child of the Wind/Throw Away the Cane" (1956), "Pink Cloud" (1955)
- The Ed Sullivan Show (TV variety show) Episode #11.2 (1957)
- The Dinah Shore Chevy Show (TV variety show) Episode #1.8 (1957), Episode #2.27 (1958), Episode #2.31 (1958)
- Pursuit (TV Series) "Epitaph for a Golden Girl" (1958)
- The Millionaire (TV Series) "Millionaire Emily Baker" (1959)
- General Electric Theater (TV Series) "Strictly Solo" (1960)
- Rawhide (TV Series) "Incident of the Swindler" (1964), "Incident of the Widowed Dove" (1959)
- Family Affair (TV Series) "Our Friend Stanley" (1967) (final appearance)
- Howard Hughes: His Women and His Movies (television documentary) (2000)
