= Vengeance Valley =

1951 film directed by directed by Richard Thorpe

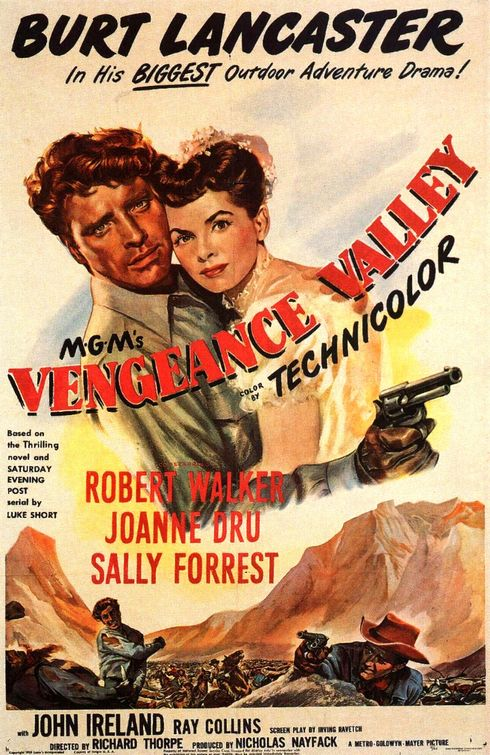
- Theatrical poster
- Directed by: Richard Thorpe
- Screenplay by: Irving Ravetch
- Based on: Vengeance Valley; 1950 novel by Luke Short
- Produced by: Nicholas Nayfack
- Starring: Burt Lancaster; Robert Walker; John Ireland; Joanne Dru
- Cinematography: George J. Folsey
- Edited by: Conrad A. Nervig
- Music by: Rudolph G. Kopp
- Production company: Metro-Goldwyn-Mayer
- Distributed by: Loew's Inc.
- Release date: February 15, 1951 (New York)
- Running time: 83 minutes
- Language: English
- Budget: $1,008,000
- Box office: $3,146,000

Vengeance Valley is a 1951 American Technicolor Western film directed by Richard Thorpe and starring Burt Lancaster, Robert Walker, Joanne Dru, Sally Forrest, John Ireland and Ray Collins. It is based on a novel by Luke Short.

In 1979, the film entered the public domain in the United States because Metro-Goldwyn-Mayer failed to renew its copyright registration in the 28th year after publication.

== Plot ==
Owen Daybright is the foreman at the Colorado cattleman Arch Strobie's ranch and is also Strobie's foster son. Owen and his foster brother Lee hear that Lily Fasken has given birth. Owen takes food and money to Lily and finds Lee's wife Jen and Lily's brother Dick, who has been trying to identify the baby's father. Owen is concerned for Lily's welfare. When Jen asks him to disclose the identity of father, Owen does not reply. Dick suspects that Owen is the father, but Jen denies it because Owen is a good man.

Lee thanks Owen for helping Lily and says that he cannot admit being the father, as Jen would not understand. Dick threatens Owen with a gun, but they are interrupted by the sheriff.

At the Strobie ranch, Owen tells Arch, who has been crippled for 20 years, that he doesn't need Owen's help any longer with Lee having married. Arch explains that still needs Owen, who agrees to stay.

Lily and Dick's brother Hub tells the sheriff that he will kill someone, but he does not know whom yet. Dick tells Jen that he will extract the truth from Owen. Accompanied by ranch hand Hewie, Owen visits Lily, and Dick and Hub also arrive. Dick and Owen fight before Lily interrupts them, armed with a gun. She tells Owen to take her brothers to the sheriff.

Jen learns that Lee has taken $500 from their joint account. She confronts Lee, who says that Owen is the father of Lily's baby, but Jen does not believe him. Jen threatens to leave, but Owen persuades her to remain, saying that Arch needs them both. Lee finds that Jen has locked him out of their bedroom. Owen persuades Lee to remain by agreeing to give him a half share of the ranch.

Owen, Lee and Hewie track their stolen steers to Herb Backett's ranch. Owen cannot prove that the steers had been there and fights with Backett, who stabs him. Owen and Hewie take four of Backett's steers as compensation. Lee, uninvolved in the fight, offers to pay Backett for the steers. Backett agrees but vows revenge against Owen. During a party at their ranch, Lee is drunk and mistakenly concludes that Owen and Jen are having an affair.

Lee plots with Backett to have Dick and Hub join the spring roundup after they are freed from jail to pursue Owen. The roundup is split into east and west divisions, with Owen and the Strobie ranch hands in one and Lee and the Fasken brothers in the other. Lee arranges to sell the Strobie steers to Dave Allard. In a heavy rainstorm, Allard misses the telegraph office and finds himself at Owen's camp. Hewie admits that he has feelings for Lily. When the two divisions meet, Owen tells Lee that he is aware of the situation. Hewie spots the Faskens and tells Owen, who realizes that Lee must have known but said nothing to him.

Lee tells Owen that he has changed his mind and will cancel the sale to Allard, but he wants Owen to accompany him to help cancel the deal. The Faskens shoot Owen, who falls from his horse, and Lee rides away. Owen shoots Dick but is shot himself. Owen recovers his horse and pursues Lee, who falls from his horse, allowing Owen to catch him. Owen says that they will tell Arch everything. Lee points his gun, but Owen is quicker on the draw and kills him.

Owen tells the whole story to Arch, who says that it his own fault for not handling Lee himself.

== Cast ==
Vengeance Valley (1951)

- Burt Lancaster as Owen Daybright
- Robert Walker as Lee Strobie
- Joanne Dru as Jen Strobie
- Sally Forrest as Lily Fasken
- John Ireland as Hub Fasken
- Carleton Carpenter as Hewie
- Ray Collins as Arch Strobie
- Ted de Corsia as Herb Backett
- Hugh O'Brian as Dick Fasken
- Will Wright as Mr. Willoughby
- Grayce Mills as Mrs. Burke
- Tom Fadden as Obie Rune
- Jim Hayward as Sheriff Con Alvis
- James Harrison as Orv Esterly
- Stanley Andrews as Mead Calhoun
- Glenn Strange as Dave Allard (uncredited)

== Reception ==
In a contemporary review for The New York Times, critic Thomas M. Pryor called the film "not the sort of action fare that could be recommended unconditionally as a Saturday afternoon entertainment for the young and innocent" and wrote:

"Vengeance Valley" has a considerable amount of excitement and there is an almost documentary quality about the long sequences which provide a graphic picture of what it is like to be out on the range at round-up time. Richard Thorpe has directed these scenes expertly and he has a fine, sturdy and convincing foreman in Burt Lancaster. But "Vengeance Valley" is primarily a problem drama ... A good deal of the story is covered by dialogue, a necessary, but unfortunate, circumstance, considering the nature of the drama. All this talk may tend to slow "Vengeance Valley" down to a gentle trot at times, but on the whole the picture is a creditable entertainment. It is, however, a Western which might give the kiddies some unnecessary ideas about life in the open spaces."

According to MGM records, the film earned $1,997,000 in the U.S. and Canada and $1,149,000 elsewhere, resulting in a profit of $3,138,000.

== See also ==
- List of films in the public domain in the United States
