= Cry of the Hunted =

1953 film by Joseph H. Lewis

- Theatrical release poster
- Directed by: Joseph H. Lewis
- Screenplay by: Jack Leonard
- Story by: Jack Leonard; Marion Wolfe
- Produced by: William Grady Jr.
- Starring: Vittorio Gassman; Barry Sullivan; Polly Bergen
- Cinematography: Harold Lipstein
- Edited by: Conrad A. Nervig
- Music by: Rudolph G. Kopp
- Production company: Metro-Goldwyn-Mayer
- Distributed by: Loew's Inc
- Release date: May 8, 1953 (United States)
- Running time: 80 minutes
- Country: United States
- Language: English
- Budget: $544,000
- Box office: $625,000

Cry of the Hunted is a 1953 American crime film noir starring Vittorio Gassman, Barry Sullivan and Polly Bergen. It was directed by Joseph H. Lewis.

== Plot ==
An obsessive California lawman (Barry Sullivan) chases an escaped fugitive (Vittorio Gassman) through the Louisiana bayou.

== Cast ==
- Vittorio Gassman as Jory
- Barry Sullivan as Lieutenant Tunner
- Polly Bergen as Janet Tunner
- William Conrad as Goodwin
- Mary Zavian as Ella
- Robert Burton as Warden Keeley
- Harry Shannon as Sheriff Brown
- Jonathan Cott as Deputy Davis

== Reception ==
According to MGM records the film earned $376,000 in the US and Canada and $249,000 elsewhere resulting in a loss of $179,000.

=== Critical response ===
Film critic Hal Erickson, of AllMovie, praised the directing of the film in an undated 2000's review, writing, "On the whole, the MGM B product of the 1950s contained some of the studio's best-ever 'small' pictures...Cry of the Hunted is directed with flair by Joseph H. Lewis, who always managed to rise above the slimmest of budgets and the barest of production values."

TV Guide in an undated 2000s review in its film guide also wrote well of the film, "Stylishly directed chase film from Lewis who had previously shown his talent in Gun Crazy...At one point he is caught but again breaks free, only to be recaptured again at the finale. Interesting subplot has Conrad waiting for Sullivan to make a wrong move so he can grab his job."
