= Mystery Street =

1950 film by John Sturges

- Theatrical release poster
- Directed by: John Sturges
- Screenplay by: Sydney Boehm; Richard Brooks
- Story by: Leonard Spigelgass
- Produced by: Frank E. Taylor
- Starring: Ricardo Montalbán; Sally Forrest; Bruce Bennett; Elsa Lanchester; Marshall Thompson
- Cinematography: John Alton
- Edited by: Ferris Webster
- Music by: Rudolph G. Kopp
- Distributed by: Metro-Goldwyn-Mayer
- Release date: July 28, 1950 (United States)
- Running time: 93 minutes
- Country: United States
- Language: English
- Budget: $730,000
- Box office: $775,000

Mystery Street is a 1950 American black-and-white film noir featuring Ricardo Montalbán, Sally Forrest, Bruce Bennett, Elsa Lanchester and Marshall Thompson. Produced by MGM, it was directed by John Sturges with cinematography by John Alton.

The film was shot on location in Boston and Cape Cod; according to one critic, it was "the first commercial feature to be predominantly shot" on location in Boston. Also featured are Harvard Medical School in Boston, Massachusetts and Harvard Yard in nearby Cambridge. According to Frances Glessner Lee biographer Bruce Goldfarb, the story of the death of Irene Perry in Dartmouth, Massachusetts in 1940, as suggested by Glessner Lee (creator of the Nutshell Studies of Unexplained Death), was the basis of the film. The story earned Leonard Spigelgass a nomination as Best Story for the 23rd Academy Awards.

== Plot ==
Brassy blonde B-girl Vivian Heldon phones James Joshua Harkley, the married man she has been dating and tells him she's "in trouble". When he fails to show up at the Boston bar where she works, she picks up drunken Henry Shanway so she can drive his car to Cape Cod and confront Harkley. When Shanway realizes he's been driven 60 miles out of Boston, he demands that they go back, but Vivian ditches him and takes his car. She meets her reluctant beau Harkley who shoots her, buries her in the dunes, and sinks the car in a pond.

Shanway reports his car stolen, but claims it had been parked by the hospital where his wife Grace is recovering from a miscarriage. Months later, a skeleton is found on the beach. Massachusetts State Police Detective Peter Morales is assigned to the case. Dr. McAdoo, a forensics specialist at Harvard Medical School, analyzes the skeleton, and Vivian, who had been reported missing by her friend and housemate Jackie Elcott, is eventually identified.

Instead of helping the police, Vivian's conniving landlady Mrs. Smerrling tracks down Harkley herself. He denies knowing Vivian and rebuffs Smerrling's blackmail attempt, but she manages to steal his gun. Shanway's car is recovered and he is identified by witnesses who saw him with Vivian the night she was killed. Smerrling says nothing about Harkley or his gun, and the innocent Shanway is charged with murder. Smerrling is about to put the gun in a bag, to check it at a nearby train station for safekeeping, when Jackie sees it. She is initially unaware of its significance but later reports it to Morales.

Smerrling again tries to blackmail Harkley, but he threatens to kill her so she tells him where to find the gun. They are interrupted by Grace; Harkley panics, knocks out Smerrling, and flees as Morales arrives. Smerrling dies but Morales finds her baggage claim check. Harkley is arrested at the train station after a foot chase, and Shanway is exonerated.

== Cast ==
- Ricardo Montalbán as Lieutenant Peter Morales
- Sally Forrest as Grace Shanway
- Bruce Bennett as Dr. McAdoo, of Harvard Medical School
- Elsa Lanchester as Mrs. Smerrling, the landlady
- Marshall Thompson as Henry Shanway, Grace's husband
- Jan Sterling as Vivian Heldon, "B" girl and murder victim
- Edmon Ryan as James Joshua Harkley
- Betsy Blair as Jackie Elcott
- Wally Maher as Tim Sharkey
- Ralph Dumke as Tattooist
- Willard Waterman as Mortician
- Walter Burke as Ornithologist

== Reception ==
According to MGM records the film earned $429,000 domestically and $346,000 foreign, resulting in a loss of $284,000.

=== Critical response ===
Time magazine called it a "low-budget melodrama without box-office stars or advance ballyhoo [that] does not pretend to do much more than tell a straightaway, logical story of scientific crime detection" but notes that "within such modest limits, Director John Sturges and Scripters Sydney Boehm and Richard Brooks have treated the picture with such taste and craftsmanship that it is just about perfect." The New York Times called it "an adventure which, despite a low budget, is not low in taste or its attention to technical detail, backgrounds and plausibility" with a performance by Ricardo Montalbán that is "natural and unassuming."

=== Honors ===
Nominated

- Academy Awards: Best Writing, Motion Picture Story, Leonard Spigelgass; 1951.
