= Rudolph G. Kopp =

Austrian composer

Rudolph George Kopp [Austrian spelling: Rudolf Georg Kopp]
- Born: March 22, 1887; Vienna, Austro-Hungarian Empire
- Died: February 20, 1972 (aged 84); Los Angeles, California, United States
- Occupation: Composer
- Years active: 1931–1958 (film)

Rudolph George Kopp (1887–1972) was an Austrian-born American composer of film scores. He was employed by Hollywood studios Paramount Pictures and MGM.

== Selected filmography ==
- The Magnificent Lie (1931)
- Rich Man's Folly (1931)
- The Vice Squad (1931)
- The Road to Reno (1931)
- The Secret Call (1931)
- Daughter of the Dragon (1931)
- The Magnificent Lie (1931)
- The Sign of the Cross (1932)
- Two Kinds of Women (1932)
- Devil and the Deep (1932)
- Shanghai Express (1932)
- Million Dollar Legs (1932)
- Strangers in Love (1932)
- The Broken Wing (1932)
- The Phantom President (1932)
- Forgotten Commandments (1932)
- The Man from Yesterday (1932)
- One Hour with You (1932)
- Tomorrow and Tomorrow (1932)
- King of the Jungle (1933)
- I Love That Man (1933)
- I'm No Angel (1933)
- Cleopatra (1934)
- Thirty-Day Princess (1934)
- Rocky Mountain Mystery (1935)
- The Crusades (1935)
- The Voice of Bugle Ann (1936)
- Gallant Bess (1947)
- My Brother Talks to Horses (1947)
- Tenth Avenue Angel (1948)
- The Bride Goes Wild (1948)
- The Doctor and the Girl (1949)
- Ambush (1950)
- Mystery Street (1950)
- It's a Big Country (1951)
- Bannerline (1951)
- Vengeance Valley (1951)
- Calling Bulldog Drummond (1951)
- Desperate Search (1952)
- Fearless Fagan (1952)
- The Devil Makes Three (1952)
- Cry of the Hunted (1953)
- Arena (1953)
- The Great Diamond Robbery (1954)
- Gypsy Colt (1954)

== Bibliography ==
- Clinton, Franz Anthony. British Thrillers, 1950–1979: 845 Films of Suspense, Mystery, Murder and Espionage. McFarland, 2020.
- Paula, Musegades. Aaron Copland's Hollywood Film Scores. Boydell & Brewer, 2020.
- McCarty, Clifford. Film Composers in America: A Filmography, 1911–1970. Oxford University Press, 2000.
