= Ride the High Iron =

1956 film

- Directed by: Don Weis
- Written by: Milton S. Gelman
- Produced by: William Self
- Starring: Don Taylor; Sally Forrest; Raymond Burr
- Cinematography: Joe Novak
- Edited by: Joseph Gluck
- Music by: Melvyn Lenard
- Production company: Columbia Pictures
- Distributed by: Columbia Pictures
- Release date: December 1956
- Running time: 74 minutes
- Country: United States
- Language: English

Ride the High Iron is a 1956 American drama film directed by Don Weis and starring Don Taylor, Sally Forrest and Raymond Burr.

== Plot ==
A returning Korean War veteran tries to cover-up his humble background when he becomes engaged to a young socialite. Things are complicated by the involvement of self-serving public relations man.

== Cast ==
- Don Taylor as Sgt. Hugo Danielchik
- Sally Forrest as Elsie Vanders
- Raymond Burr as Ziggy Moline
- Lisa Golm as Mrs. Danielchik
- Otto Waldis as Yanusz Danielchik
- Nestor Paiva as Yard Boss
- Mae Clarke as Mrs. Vanders
- Maurice Marsac as Maurice
- Bobby Johnson as Porter
- Bess Flowers as Nightclub Patron

== Bibliography ==
- Robert J. Lentz. Korean War Filmography: 91 English Language Features through 2000. McFarland, 2016.
