= If You Don't Stop It... You'll Go Blind!!! =

- Theatrical release poster
- Directed by: Keefe Brasselle; I. Robert Levy
- Written by: Mike Callie
- Produced by: Mike Callie; I. Robert Levy
- Starring: George Spencer; Patrick Wright; Jane Kellem; Keefe Brasselle
- Cinematography: John Dirlam
- Edited by: Gene Ranney
- Music by: Bob Jung
- Production company: Callie-Levy Productions
- Distributed by: Topar Films
- Release date: January 1975
- Running time: 80 minutes
- Country: United States
- Language: English

If You Don't Stop It... You'll Go Blind!!! is a 1975 American comedy film directed by Keefe Brasselle and I. Robert Levy.

The film was followed two years later by the sequel Can I Do It... 'Til I Need Glasses?

== Plot summary ==
The World Society of Sexual Arts and Sciences holds its annual meeting to select the year's winners of the World Sex awards. The selection committee views film clips of the various contestants (a series of sex-themed comedy sketches). At the final awards show, the golden "dildies" are presented to the winners and Keefe Brasselle sings and dances with showgirls.

== Cast ==
(members of the ensemble playing multiple roles in sketches)

- George Spencer
- Pat Wright
- Jane Kellem
- Moe Baker
- Lew Horn
- Herb Graham
- Alan Sinclair
- Ina Gould
- Uschi Digard
- Jackie McCall
- Richard Stuart

Specialties:

- Pat McCormick as testimonial emcee
- Keefe Brasselle as himself, singing the musical finale

== Production ==
In 1974 Keefe Brasselle, former film actor best known for the leading role in The Eddie Cantor Story, signed on as director of the low-budget sex comedy If You Don't Stop It... You'll Go Blind (released 1975; shown in Britain as You Must Be Joking). This was a feature-length parade of burlesque blackouts, double-entendre jokes, and bawdy song-and-dance numbers. Brasselle staged the musical numbers himself and even appeared as a specialty act, embellishing his performance with Eddie Cantor's gestures and mannerisms.

== Reception ==
Boxoffice described the film as "really a series of one-liners and blue vignettes" and reported, "This R-rated sexploitation effort has done well in some limited situations thus far, and future box-office record is going to depend on just how effective the ad campaign is in reaching its intended audience." The film's distributor placed ads in college newspapers, and the feature was booked into theaters near college campuses for midnight shows.

Vincent Canby of The New York Times panned the film as "a collection of witless blackout sketches dealing with infidelity, wedding nights, impotence, and masturbation, played by a small cast of not very talented actors." Colin Phalow of The Monthly Film Bulletin wrote: "A tasteless revue of dramatised graffiti, dirty one-liners, and 'after-dinner' jokes. Showman Keefe Brasselle co-directs with an embarrassing, misplaced nostalgia for the stale techniques of the weekly comedy hour he hosted on American TV in the late Sixties; the 'big band' score, cramped camerawork, run-on skits, creaking song-and-dance routines, and corny opticals certainly hasn't improved with age." The film fared well enough with audiences to be reissued in 1980, but critics who missed the first release were unimpressed. Gene Siskel of the Chicago Tribune, reviewing its first Chicago engagement in 1980, gave the film zero stars out of four and called it a "sleazy, unfunny sex comedy," admitting that "I lasted 30 minutes before walking out." He selected it for a "Dog of the Week" segment on PBS' Sneak Previews.

Despite these negative reviews, the film was very popular with college students. The Hollywood Reporter noted that the film "has topped the $1 million box-office figure in Canada alone. In the U. S., the film has grossed over $2 million playing to only 12% of the country, bringing total gross to over $3,000,000." The same paper's gossip columnist wrote, "Keefe Brasselle insists he's still a nice boy despite appearing in the If You Don't Stop It... You'll Go Blind pic. Points out it's not a porno pic, but officially R-rated by the MPAA."

Producer Mike Callie made the film for $500,000 -- $150,000 in cash, and $350,000 deferred until the profits came in. "It brought in more than $10 million in various grind houses in the U. S."

Callie filmed a sequel, Can I Do It... 'Til I Need Glasses?, which completed filming in October 1976. A small role was taken by the young Robin Williams; when Williams became a comedy star, the producers found snippets of Williams that they had cut out, fitted them into the film, and reissued it as a Robin Williams comedy in 1980.

== See also ==
- List of American films of 1975
