= Keefe Brasselle =

American actor, producer (1923–1981)

- Born: Henry Keefe Brassil; February 7, 1923; Elyria, Ohio, U.S.
- Died: July 7, 1981 (aged 58); Downey, California, U.S.
- Occupations: Actor; producer; author
- Years active: 1942–1973
- Spouses: Norma Jean Aldrich (m. 1942; div. 1956) Arlene DeMarco (m. 1956; div. 1967)
- Children: 3

Keefe Brasselle (February 7, 1923 – July 7, 1981) was an American film actor, television actor/producer, recording artist, nightclub entertainer, and author. He is best remembered for the starring role in the film The Eddie Cantor Story (1953). He is also known for his brief tenure as a CBS Television executive in the early 1960s, and for his presence on both sides of the camera in the 1975 comedy feature If You Don't Stop It... You'll Go Blind.

== Early years and career ==
He was born Henry Keefe Brassil, the son of an Irish father, Henry Richard Brassil, a hotel manager in Cleveland, Ohio; and Madelaine Antonelli, an Italian nightclub singer from New York. Keefe was raised by his mother and her second husband, Harold Prindle, in New York; Prindle trained Keefe for a career in show business.

Brasselle joined the U. S. Army in 1942 and appeared in a few motion pictures without screen credit. Just a few days after separating from the Army in September 1944, he auditioned for the juvenile lead opposite singing star Gloria Jean in the waterfront mystery River Gang (filmed in 1944, released 1945). His dark, chorus-boy looks landed him the role, and he went on to featured roles in movies. Ida Lupino cast him in two pictures she produced herself, Not Wanted (1949) and Never Fear (1950).

Brasselle's mother was actress Betty Grable's personal hairdresser, using the name Marie Brasselle. In 1949 she wrote, "My son, Keefe Brasselle, is an actor. [Betty] called Louella Parsons and gave Keefe a build-up that would make a press agent's conversation sound weak by comparison. That plug from Betty Grable, who has never sought publicity for herself, did Keefe a lot of good, and he'll never forget it." Brasselle was signed by Metro-Goldwyn-Mayer in 1950 as a promising leading man.

Warner Bros. groomed him for stardom in The Eddie Cantor Story (1953), filmed in response to the wildly successful The Jolson Story and Jolson Sings Again starring Larry Parks as Al Jolson, one of Cantor's musical-comedy contemporaries. The Eddie Cantor Story could not equal the success of the Jolson films, largely because Brasselle didn't fit the role physically. Standing almost a foot taller than the real Cantor, and unable to convey Cantor's natural warmth, Brasselle's performance became a caricature: the actor played most of his scenes with bulging eyes and busy hands, which was effective in the musical numbers but awkward in the dramatic scenes. In 1954, to promote the film, he was a guest on an episode (season 4, episode 21, February 21, 1954) of The Colgate Comedy Hour with host Gene Wesson.

Ultimately, Brasselle's career did not launch as anticipated, and he reverted to second and third leads in minor films. An attempt in 1957 to find starring roles in England resulted in two feature films, after which he returned to the United States for occasional appearances on television.

== Nightclubs and television ==
On October 12, 1957 he was the emcee for the premiere episode of the ABC television quiz show Keep It in the Family, but was replaced by Bill Nimmo that following week.

Determined to find steadier work, Brasselle turned to nightclubs, where he appeared as a singer and comedian. In 1961, an Edison Township, New Jersey, nightclub owned by Brasselle burned under suspicious circumstances. Fire officials came across six empty cans of gasoline at the scene, while their caps and spouts were found separately in a paper bag.

In the summer of 1963, Brasselle starred in a CBS summer replacement series for The Garry Moore Show. Called The Keefe Brasselle Show, the program featured actress Ann B. Davis as herself in three episodes. A 21-year-old Barbra Streisand appeared on his first episode on June 25, 1963, in promoting her first album.

Brasselle had a close friendship with CBS executive James Aubrey. Brasselle started his own production company, "Richelieu Productions," and Aubrey granted Brasselle's company three new but untested television series without any previous script, pitch, or pilots: The Baileys of Balboa starring Paul Ford, The Cara Williams Show, and The Reporter starring Harry Guardino. These received preferential treatment, airing during the 1964–1965 season in the "cushiest time periods available in all of network TV today," according to Variety, and all had poor ratings. None of them lasted longer than one season.

Brasselle, notorious for his inflated ego and brash self-confidence, insisted on Aubrey's total support. This even extended to routine appointments, as Variety reported: "When Aubrey failed to arrive at the appointed hour, Brasselle summoned the ground floor receptionist to relay the urgent and impatient message to 'phone Mr. Aubrey that he's keeping Mr. Brasselle waiting.' Insiders say that the sheer bravado of the Brasselle communication shook the entire CBS building; multi-million-dollar clients have been known to cool their heels in the 19th floor reception room while awaiting an overdue Aubrey appointment." There were rumors that Aubrey had no choice in approving the Brasselle projects due to threats from the Mafia, with which Brasselle was known to be connected. The insider chicanery angered CBS stockholders, who filed and won a lawsuit against Aubrey and Brasselle. Aubrey was removed as president of CBS Television in February 1965.

Brasselle later wrote a novel that was a thinly disguised account of his relationship with Aubrey and the network, The CanniBal$ (1968), followed by a sequel, The Barracudas (1973), in which he attacked several showbiz figures he had worked with, including comedian Jack Benny. Brasselle struggled to find work after his CBS experience and tried to relaunch his fading career, as a self-styled "modern minstrel" recording artist.

== Personal life ==
In 1942, 19-year-old Brasselle married Norma Jean Aldrich; the marriage ended in divorce in 1956.

That same year, Brasselle married singer Arlene DeMarco (one of The DeMarco Sisters) (January 28, 1933 – February 19, 2013). They divorced in 1967.

== Later years and death ==
In 1974, Brasselle signed on as director of the low-budget sex comedy If You Don't Stop It... You'll Go Blind (released 1975; shown in Britain as You Must Be Joking). This was a feature-length parade of burlesque blackouts, double-entendre jokes, and bawdy song-and-dance numbers. Brasselle staged the musical numbers himself and even appeared as a specialty act, embellishing his performance with Eddie Cantor's gestures and mannerisms. Boxoffice described the film as "really a series of one-liners and blue vignettes" and reported, "This R-rated sexploitation effort has done well in some limited situations thus far, and future box-office record is going to depend on just how effective the ad campaign is in reaching its intended audience." The film's distributor placed ads in college newspapers, and the feature was booked into hundreds of theaters near college campuses for midnight shows. Despite negative reviews from mainstream critics, the film was very popular with college students. The Hollywood Reporter noted that the film "has topped the $1 million box-office figure in Canada alone. In the U. S., the film has grossed over $2 million playing to only 12% of the country, bringing total gross to over $3,000,000." The same paper's gossip columnist wrote, "Keefe Brasselle insists he's still a nice boy despite appearing in the If You Don't Stop It... You'll Go Blind pic. Points out it's not a porno pic, but officially R-rated by the MPAA." The film returned to theaters in 1980.

Keefe Brasselle died from liver disease in 1981, at age 58.

== Radio appearances ==
| Year | Program | Episode/source |
|---|---|---|
| 1952 | Stars in the Air | The House on 92nd Street |

== Filmography ==
| Year | Title | Role | Notes |
|---|---|---|---|
| 1942 | USS VD: Ship of Shame | Chicken | military training film, uncredited |
| 1944 | Janie | Soldier | uncredited |
| 1944 | Three Little Sisters | Soldier | uncredited |
| 1945 | River Gang | Johnny | |
| 1947 | Bells of San Angelo | Ignacio | uncredited |
| 1947 | Repeat Performance | Delivery Boy | uncredited |
| 1947 | Killer at Large | Copy Boy | uncredited |
| 1947 | Heartaches | Gus, Prop Boy | uncredited |
| 1947 | Railroaded! | Cowie Kowalski | |
| 1947 | T-Men | Ocean Park Hotel Desk Clerk | uncredited |
| 1948 | The Babe Ruth Story | Call Boy | uncredited |
| 1949 | Not Wanted | Drew Baxter | |
| 1950 | Never Fear | Guy Richards | |
| 1950 | Dial 1119 | Skip | |
| 1951 | A Place in the Sun | Earl Eastman | |
| 1951 | Bannerline | Mike Perrivale | |
| 1951 | The Unknown Man | Rudi Wallchek | |
| 1951 | It's a Big Country | Sgt. Maxie Klein | |
| 1952 | Skirts Ahoy! | Dick Hallson | |
| 1953 | The Eddie Cantor Story | Eddie Cantor | |
| 1954 | Three Young Texans | Tony Ballew | |
| 1955 | Mad at the World | Sam Bennett, aka Bill Holland | |
| 1955 | Bring Your Smile Along | Marty Adams | |
| 1956 | Battle Stations | Chris Jordan | |
| 1957 | West of Suez | Brett Manders | British film, released in the United States as The Fighting Wildcats |
| 1958 | Death Over My Shoulder | Jack Regan | British film |
| 1973 | Black Gunn | Winman | |
| 1975 | If You Don't Stop It... You'll Go Blind | Himself | (final film role) |
