= Just This Once (film) =

1952 film by Don Weis

- Directed by: Don Weis
- Written by: Sidney Sheldon
- Story by: Max Trell
- Produced by: Henry Berman
- Starring: Janet Leigh; Peter Lawford; Lewis Stone
- Cinematography: Ray June
- Edited by: Fredrick Y. Smith
- Music by: David Rose
- Production company: Metro-Goldwyn-Mayer
- Distributed by: Metro-Goldwyn-Mayer
- Release dates: February 27, 1952; March 17, 1952 (New York)
- Running time: 90 minutes
- Country: United States
- Language: English
- Budget: $547,000
- Box office: $1.059,000

Just This Once is a 1952 Metro-Goldwyn-Mayer American romantic comedy film directed by Don Weis and starring Peter Lawford, Janet Leigh and Lewis Stone. The film's sets were designed by the art director James Basevi.

== Plot ==
Mark MacLene IV is a millionaire playboy who is irresponsible with his money, accumulating $5 million in debt. Judge Coulter, the executor of Mark's estate, places his finances in the hands of penny-pinching lawyer Lucy Duncan. Mark is aghast when Lucy limits him to a $50-per-week allowance. However, he continues to spend wildly. When Lucy closes his access to his funds, Mark becomes angry and intrudes upon her personal life, moving into her apartment and upsetting her routine. She wants to quit, but Coulter doubles her pay.

Lucy's fiancé Tom Winters has delayed proposing marriage until he can afford to support her. Mark owns a construction company where Tom works, so he secretly plots to secure a huge pay raise for Tom, but Lucy is not fooled by the ruse. After spending more time with Mark, she begins to see a different side of him and they begin to fall in love. She ends her relationship with Tom.

Mark proposes, but Lucy refuses him, saying that she cannot marry a man who does not work. Mark declares that he will find a job and Lucy responds with enthusiasm. He later lies to her that he has found a job at a chemistry lab. He plays golf every day, and when he sees her, he speaks in chemistry terms that he read in a textbook. Lucy discovers the deception and dismisses Mark from her life, but when Tom returns and discusses the details of his job, she realizes that she has made a mistake.

Lucy learns that Mark has requested active duty in the Navy Reserve. She desperately tries to find him before he is shipped away on orders. They reunite and he informs her that he is stationed in Washington, D.C., where he has charge of naval expenditures.

== Cast ==
- Peter Lawford as Mark MacLene
- Janet Leigh as Lucille Duncan
- Lewis Stone as Judge Coulter
- Richard Anderson as Tom Winters
- Marilyn Erskine as Gertrude Crome
- Douglas Fowley as Frank Pirosh
- Hanley Stafford as Mr. Blackwell
- Henry Slate as Jeff Parma
- Jerry Hausner as Stanley Worth
- Benny Rubin as Herbert Engel
- Charles Watts as Adam Backwith
- Ned Glass as Court Clerk (uncredited)
- Ida Moore as Mrs. Morgan (uncredited)

== Reception ==
In a contemporary review for The New York Times, critic Bosley Crowther wrote: "'Just This Once' is the title of the new Metro comedy ... It is also a fair expression of the measure of tolerance that a person of generous disposition might afford to adopt towards it. For there's no denying the obvious: the people who made this film had better do better next time. Meanwhile, what they've done will pass—for now. ... [W]e must caution Sidney Sheldon, who wrote it, and Don Weis, who put it on. Their boyish flippancy and nonsense had better henceforth be curbed."

According to MGM records, the film earned $707,000 in the U.S. and Canada and $352,000 elsewhere, returning a profit of $89,000.

== Comic-book adaptation ==
- Eastern Color Movie Love #14 (April 1952)
