= Philip K. Scheuer =

American film critic (1902–1985)

- Born: March 24, 1902; Newark, New Jersey, U.S.
- Died: February 19, 1985 (aged 82); Hollywood, California, U.S.
- Occupations: Film critic; journalist
- Employer(s): Los Angeles Times (1927–1967)
- Spouse: Constance Marie Kraus (m. 1937; died 1962)
- Children: 1
- Relatives: Lucie Scheuer (daughter)

Philip K. Scheuer (March 24, 1902 – February 19, 1985) was an American film critic who wrote for the Los Angeles Times for forty years.

== Life and career ==
Scheuer was born on March 24, 1902, in Newark, New Jersey. In high school, he won a trip to interview prominent figures in the Hollywood filmmaking industry and then decided to pursue a career for himself. During the silent film era, he had invested $2,700 (equivalent to $49,102 in 2025) in producing an "allegedly artistic quickie", where he served as an assistant cameraman to Leon Shamroy, wrote the title cards and a music cue sheet, and served as a cutter. However, Scheuer lost his investment as his project was never released.

In March 1927, he was hired by Edwin Schallert at the Los Angeles Times as an assistant film critic. Scheuer's early contributions to the Los Angeles Times chronicled the shift from silent to sound films that was occurring. He was concerned with helping to establish cinema as a valid and discrete art form separate from other performing arts.

Scheuer, along with his colleague Edwin Schallert, faced difficulty with the perception that serious film criticism could only be written by New York–area writers such as Bosley Crowther, A. H. Weiler and Howard Thompson, all from The New York Times. Meanwhile, Scheuer developed close relationships with many influential Hollywood personalities and especially benefited from his connections with film press agents. In February 1958, Scheuer succeeded Schallert as the motion picture editor for the Los Angeles Times, when his colleague decided to retire.

By the mid-1960s, Scheuer became disgusted by the explicit depiction of sex and violence in mainstream Hollywood films. A friend later explained that Scheuer hated the "new freedom" seen in contemporary films because it was "anathema to a man of taste and breeding". On March 26, 1967, Scheuer retired from the Los Angeles Times. His last published film review was for The Taming of the Shrew (1967), printed on March 22. At the time of his retirement, Scheuer was believed to be the only working critic who had been reviewing films since the silent era. He was succeeded by Charles Champlin.

== Death ==
Scheuer died on February 18, 1985, at the Hollywood Presbyterian Medical Center from an undisclosed illness. His wife, Constance Marie Kraus, a former chorus dancer in Busby Berkeley's films, had died on November 27, 1962, from a heart attack, at the age of 52. Scheuer had one daughter, Lucie, who became a staff writer for the Los Angeles Times during the early 1970s.

== Awards ==
In 1959, Scheuer received the Critics Award from the Screen Directors Guild for his "outstanding critical appraisal in the field of motion pictures."
