= You for Me =

1952 film by Don Weis

- Directed by: Don Weis
- Screenplay by: William Roberts
- Story by: William Roberts
- Produced by: Henry Berman
- Starring: Peter Lawford; Jane Greer; Gig Young
- Cinematography: Paul C. Vogel
- Edited by: Newell P. Kimlin
- Music by: Alberto Colombo
- Distributed by: Metro-Goldwyn-Mayer
- Release date: July 18, 1952 (United States)
- Running time: 71 minutes
- Country: United States
- Language: English
- Budget: $382,000
- Box office: $580,000

You for Me is a 1952 American romantic comedy film directed by Don Weis and starring Peter Lawford, Jane Greer and Gig Young. The film was produced by Henry Berman, with music by Alberto Colombo.

== Plot ==
Katie, a nurse, must decide whether she should marry for love or money. She is pursued by Tony, a wealthy but irresponsible sportsman, and Jeff, a handsome but conventional, doctor. Tony's ex-wife complicates matters.

== Cast ==
- Peter Lawford as Tony Brown
- Jane Greer as Katie McDermad
- Gig Young as Dr. Jeff Chadwick
- Rita Corday as Lucille Brown
- Howard Wendell as Oliver Wherry
- Otto Hulett as Hugo McDermad
- Barbara Brown as Edna McDermad
- Barbara Ruick as Mrs. Ann Elcott
- Kathryn Card as Nurse Vogel
- Tommy Farrell as Dr. Rollie Cobb
- Elaine Stewart as Girl in Club Car Knitting
- Perry Sheehan as Nurse
- Paul Smith as Frank Elcott
- Helen Winston as Flora Adams
- Ned Glass as Harlow Douglas (uncredited)
- Hal Smith as Malcolm (uncredited)

== Reception ==
=== Box office ===
According to MGM records, the film earned $457,000 in the U.S. and Canada and $123,000 elsewhere, resulting in a loss of $38,000.

=== Critical response ===
Picturegoer magazine wrote: "Jane Greer puts over the venerable story so cleverly and makes such good use of the smart dialogue that it ... generously hands out laughs."
