= Ida Lupino =

British actress (1918–1995)

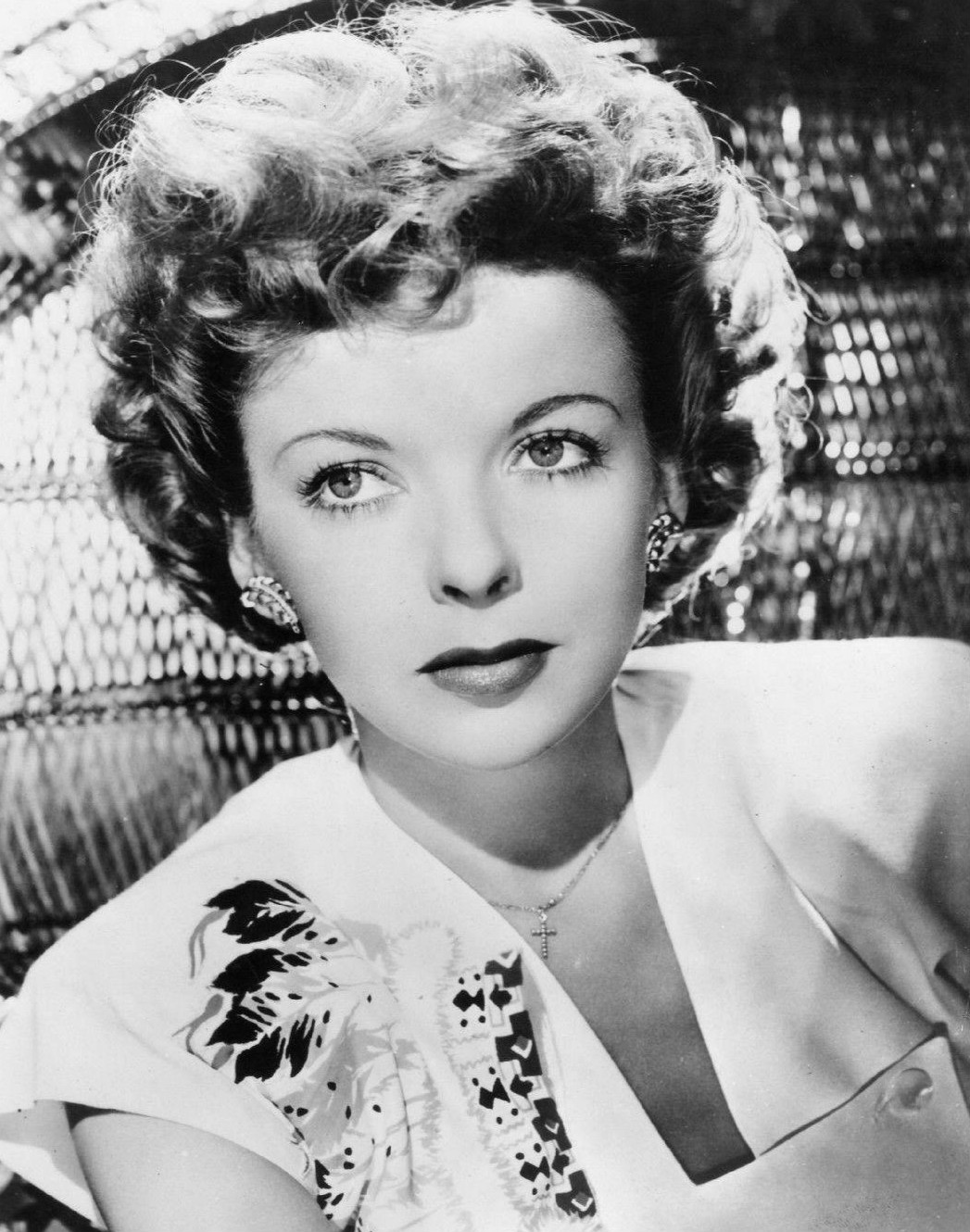
- Lupino before performance on the radio series Cavalcade of America
- Born: 4 February 1918; Herne Hill, Surrey, England
- Died: 3 August 1995 (aged 77); Los Angeles, California, US
- Citizenship: United Kingdom; United States
- Education: Royal Academy of Dramatic Art
- Occupations: Actress; director; writer; producer
- Years active: 1931–1978
- Political party: Democratic
- Spouses: Louis Hayward (m. 1938; div. 1945) Collier Young (m. 1948; div. 1951) Howard Duff (m. 1951; div. 1984)
- Children: 1
- Parents: Stanley Lupino (father); Connie Emerald (mother)
- Family: Lupino

Ida Lupino (4 February 1918 – 3 August 1995) was a British and American actress and filmmaker. Throughout her 48-year career she appeared in 59 films and directed eight, working primarily in the United States, where she became a citizen in 1948. She is widely regarded as the most prominent female filmmaker working in the 1950s during the Hollywood studio system era. With her independent production company she co-wrote and co-produced several social-message films and became the first woman to direct a film noir, The Hitch-Hiker, in 1953.

Among Lupino's other directed films the best known are Not Wanted (1949), about unwed pregnancy (she took over for a sick director and refused directorial credit); Never Fear (1950), loosely based upon her own experiences battling paralysis by polio; Outrage (1950), one of the first films about rape; The Bigamist (1953); and The Trouble with Angels (1966). Her short yet immensely influential directorial career, tackling themes of women trapped by social conventions, usually under melodramatic or noir coverings, is a pioneering example of proto-feminist filmmaking.

As an actress Lupino's best known films are The Adventures of Sherlock Holmes (1939) with Basil Rathbone, They Drive by Night (1940) with George Raft and Humphrey Bogart, High Sierra (1941) with Bogart, The Sea Wolf (1941) with Edward G. Robinson and John Garfield, Ladies in Retirement (1941) with Louis Hayward, Moontide (1942) with Jean Gabin, The Hard Way (1943), Deep Valley (1947) with Dane Clark, Road House (1948) with Cornel Wilde and Richard Widmark, While the City Sleeps (1956) with Dana Andrews and Vincent Price, and Junior Bonner (1972) with Steve McQueen.

Lupino also directed more than 100 episodes of television shows in a variety of genres, including westerns, supernatural tales, situation comedies, murder mysteries, and gangster stories. She was the only woman to direct an episode of the original The Twilight Zone series ("The Masks") and the only director to star in an episode ("The Sixteen-Millimeter Shrine").

== Early life and family ==
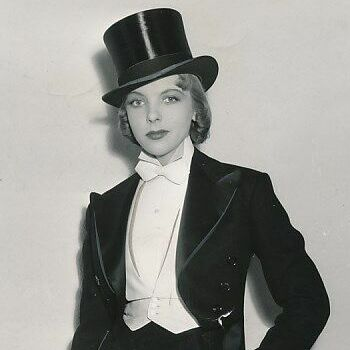
Lupino in 1937

Lupino was born at 33 Ardbeg Road in Herne Hill, London, to actress Connie O'Shea (also known as Connie Emerald) and music hall comedian Stanley Lupino, a member of the theatrical Lupino family, which included Lupino Lane, a song-and-dance man. Her great-grandfather George Hook Lupino (1828–1902) was an acrobatic clown descended from an Italian family of puppeteers. Her father, a top name in musical comedy in the UK, encouraged her to perform at an early age, building an outdoor theatre for her and her sister Rita (1921–2016), who also became an actress and dancer. Ida wrote her first play at age seven and toured with a travelling theatre company as a child. By the age of ten Lupino had memorised the leading female roles in Shakespeare's plays. After all this training and experience in theatre acting, Ida's uncle Lupino Lane assisted her in moving toward film acting by getting her work as a background actress at British International Studios.

Ida wanted to be a writer but, in order to please her father, enrolled in the Royal Academy of Dramatic Art. She excelled in a number of "bad girl" film roles, often playing prostitutes; however, she did not enjoy being an actress. Lupino was uncomfortable with many of the early parts she was given and felt she was pushed into the profession due to her family history.

== Career ==
=== Actress ===
Publicity photograph of Lupino for Moontide (1942)

Lupino made her first film appearance in The Love Race (1931) and the following year, aged 14, she worked under director Allan Dwan in Her First Affaire, in a role for which her mother had previously tested. She played leading roles in five British films in 1933 at Warner Bros.' Teddington studios and for Julius Hagen at Twickenham, including The Ghost Camera with John Mills and I Lived with You with Ivor Novello. She said of her early roles "My father once said to me: 'You're born to be bad', and it was true. I made eight films in England before I came to America, and I played a tramp or a slut in all of them".

Dubbed "the English Jean Harlow", she was discovered by Paramount in the 1933 film Money for Speed, playing a good girl/bad girl dual role. Lupino claimed the talent scouts saw her play only the sweet girl in the film and not the part of the prostitute, so she was asked to try out for the lead role in Alice in Wonderland (1933). When she arrived in Hollywood, the Paramount producers did not know what to make of their sultry potential leading lady, but she did get a five-year contract. While at Paramount, Lupino played the lead in a stage production of The Pursuit of Happiness at the Paramount Studio Theatre.

Lupino starred in over a dozen films in the mid-1930s while under contract to Paramount. She left the studio in late 1937 after becoming unsatisfied with her roles and remained off screen for over a year. She then worked at Columbia Pictures in a two-film deal in 1939, and at 20th Century-Fox in The Adventures of Sherlock Holmes (1939), after which she returned to Paramount for an important role in The Light That Failed (1939). This was a role she acquired after running into director William Wellman's office unannounced, demanding an audition. After this breakthrough performance as a spiteful cockney model who torments Ronald Colman, she began to be taken seriously as a dramatic actress. As a result, her parts improved during the 1940s and her stardom grew.

Mark Hellinger, associate producer at Warner Bros., was impressed by Lupino's performance in The Light That Failed, and hired her for the femme-fatale role in the Raoul Walsh-directed They Drive by Night (1940), opposite stars George Raft, Ann Sheridan and Humphrey Bogart. The film did well and the critical consensus was that Lupino stole the movie, particularly in her unhinged courtroom scene. Warner Bros. offered her a contract which she negotiated to include some freelance rights. She worked with Walsh and Bogart again in High Sierra (1941), where she impressed critic Bosley Crowther in her role as an "adoring moll".

Her performance in The Hard Way (1943) won the New York Film Critics Circle Award for Best Actress. She starred in Pillow to Post (1945), which was her only comedic leading role. Although in demand throughout the 1940s, she arguably never became a major star although she often had top billing in her pictures, above actors such as Humphrey Bogart, and was repeatedly critically lauded for her realistic, direct acting style.

She often incurred the ire of studio boss Jack Warner by objecting to her casting, refusing poorly written roles that she felt were beneath her dignity as an actress, and making script revisions deemed unacceptable by the studio. As a result, she spent a great deal of her time at Warner Bros. suspended. In 1941, she rejected a supporting role in Kings Row and a lead role in Juke Girl and was put on suspension at the studio. Within a few months, a rapprochement was brokered, but her relationship with the studio remained strained over the next few years. After the drama Deep Valley (1947) finished shooting, Lupino left Warner Brothers having turned down a four-year exclusive contract. A year later, she appeared for 20th Century Fox as a nightclub singer in the film noir Road House, performing her musical numbers in the film. She starred in On Dangerous Ground in 1951.

=== Director, writer and producer – The Filmakers Inc. ===
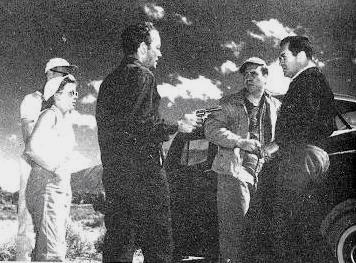
Lupino (left) directing The Hitch-Hiker, 1953

The Hitch-Hiker (1953)

While on suspension, Lupino had ample time to observe filming and editing processes, and she became interested in directing. She described how bored she was on set while "someone else seemed to be doing all the interesting work", and said "It's so much more fun. Creating it yourself, not just parading in front of a camera".

She and her then-husband, producer and writer Collier Young, formed an independent company, The Filmakers Inc., to "produce, direct, and write low-budget, issue-oriented films". It was formed in 1948 with Lupino as vice-president, Collier Young as president, and screenwriter Malvin Wald as treasurer. The Filmakers produced 12 feature films, six of which Lupino directed or co-directed, five of which she wrote or co-wrote, three of which she acted in, and one of which she co-produced. The Filmakers' mission was to make socially conscious films, encourage new talent, and bring realism to the screen. Their goal was to tell "how America lives" through independent B pictures shot in two weeks for less than US$200,000 with a creative "family", "the ring of truth" emphasized by fact-based stories – a combination of "social significance" and entertainment. In short, low-budget pictures, they explored virtually taboo subjects such as rape in Outrage (1950) and The Bigamist (1953). The latter received rave reviews at the time of release, with Howard Thompson of The New York Times calling it "Filmakers' best offering, to date". Lupino's best-known directorial effort, The Hitch-Hiker, a 1953 RKO release, is the only film noir from the genre's classic period directed by a woman.

Her first directing job came unexpectedly in 1949 when director Elmer Clifton suffered a mild heart attack and was unable to finish Not Wanted, a film Lupino co-produced and co-wrote. Lupino stepped in to finish the film without taking directorial credit out of respect for Clifton. Although the film's subject of out-of-wedlock pregnancy was controversial, it received a vast amount of publicity, and she was invited to discuss the film with Eleanor Roosevelt on a national radio program.

Never Fear (1949), a film about polio, which she had personally experienced at age 16, was her first director's credit. The film was noticed by Howard Hughes, who was looking for suppliers of low-budget feature films for distribution by his recently acquired RKO Pictures. Hughes agreed to put up financing and distribute The Filmakers' next three features through RKO, leaving The Filmakers total control over the content and the production of the films. After producing four more films about social issues, including Outrage (1950), a film about rape (while this word is never used in the movie), Lupino directed her first hard-paced, all-male-cast film, The Hitch-Hiker (1953), making her the first woman to direct a film noir.

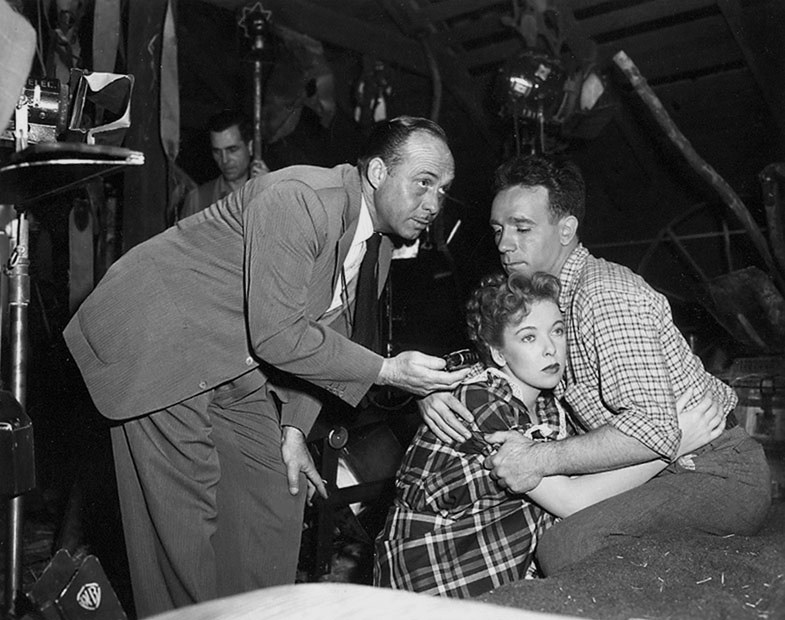
Cinematographer Ted McCord, Lupino and Dane Clark in Deep Valley (1947)

Lupino once called herself a "bulldozer" to secure financing for her production company, but she referred to herself as "mother" while on set. The back of her director's chair was labeled "Mother of Us All". Her studio emphasized her femininity, often at the urging of Lupino herself. She said of her refusal to renew her contract with Warner Bros. "I had decided that nothing lay ahead of me but the life of the neurotic star with no family and no home." She made a point to seem non-threatening in a male-dominated environment, stating, "That's where being a man makes a great deal of difference. I don't suppose the men particularly care about leaving their wives and children. During the vacation period, the wife can always fly over and be with him. It's difficult for a wife to say to her husband, come sit on the set and watch."

Although directing became Lupino's passion, she continued acting to make enough money to make her own productions. She became a wily low-budget filmmaker, reusing sets from other studio productions and talking her physician into appearing as a doctor in the delivery scene of Not Wanted. She used what is now called product placement, placing Coca-Cola, United Airlines, Cadillac, and other brands in her films, such as The Bigamist. She was acutely conscious of budget considerations, planning scenes in pre-production to avoid technical mistakes and retakes, and shooting in public places such as MacArthur Park and Chinatown to avoid set-rental costs.

The Filmakers production company ceased operations in 1955, and Lupino turned almost immediately to television, directing episodes of more than thirty US TV series from 1956 through 1968. She also directed a feature film in 1965, the Catholic schoolgirl comedy The Trouble With Angels, released in 1966, starring Hayley Mills and Rosalind Russell; this was Lupino's last theatrical film as a director. She also continued acting, going on to a successful television career throughout the 1960s and 1970s.

Year	Title	The Filmakers Inc. function	Screenplay / Writers	Producers	Directors
1949	Not Wanted	Production Company (Emerald Productions)	Paul Jarrico; Ida Lupino; Malvin Wald	Anson Bond; Ida Lupino	Elmer Clifton; Ida Lupino (uncredited)
1949	Never Fear	Production Company	Ida Lupino; Collier Young	Norman A. Cook; Ida Lupino; Collier Young	Ida Lupino; James Anderson (assistant)
1950	Outrage	Production Company	Ida Lupino; Malvin Wald; Collier Young	Collier Young; Malvin Wald	Ida Lupino
1951	Hard, Fast and Beautiful	Production Company	Martha Wilkerson	Norman A. Cook; Collier Young	Ida Lupino; James Anderson (assistant)
1951	On the Loose	Production Company	Dale Eunson; Katherine Albert	Collier Young	Charles Lederer; James Anderson (assistant)
1952	Beware, My Lovely	Presented by	Mel Dinelli	Collier Young; Mel Dinelli	Harry Horner
1953	The Hitch-Hiker	Present	Ida Lupino; Collier Young	Collier Young; Christian Nyby	Ida Lupino
1953	The Bigamist	Production Company ©	Collier Young	Robert Eggenweiler; Collier Young	Ida Lupino
1954	Private Hell 36	Presents ©	Collier Young; Ida Lupino	Robert Eggenweiler; Collier Young	Don Siegel
1955	Mad at the World	Production Company	Harry Essex	James H. Anderson; Collier Young	Harry Essex

=== Television ===
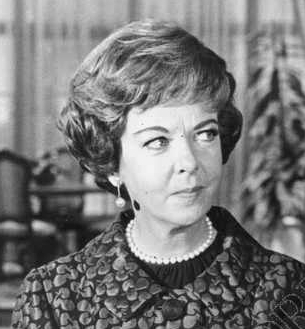
Lupino in It Takes a Thief in 1968

Lupino's career as a director continued through 1968. Her directing efforts during these years were almost exclusively for television productions such as Alfred Hitchcock Presents, Thriller, The Twilight Zone, Have Gun – Will Travel, Honey West, The Donna Reed Show, Gilligan's Island, 77 Sunset Strip, The Rifleman, The Virginian, Sam Benedict, The Untouchables, Hong Kong, The Fugitive, and Bewitched.

After the demise of The Filmakers, Lupino continued working as an actress until the end of the 1970s, mainly in television. Lupino appeared in 19 episodes of Four Star Playhouse from 1952 to 1956, an endeavor involving partners Charles Boyer, Dick Powell and David Niven. From January 1957 to September 1958, Lupino starred with her then-husband Howard Duff in the sitcom Mr. Adams and Eve, in which the duo played husband-and-wife film stars named Howard Adams and Eve Drake, living in Beverly Hills, California. Duff and Lupino also co-starred as themselves in 1959 in one of the 13 one-hour installments of The Lucy–Desi Comedy Hour and an episode of The Dinah Shore Chevy Show in 1960. Lupino guest-starred in numerous television shows, including The Ford Television Theatre (1954), Bonanza (1959), Burke's Law (1963–64), The Virginian (1963–65), Batman (1968), The Mod Squad (1969), Family Affair (1969–70), The Wild, Wild West (1969), Nanny and the Professor (1971), Columbo: Short Fuse (1972), Columbo: Swan Song (1974) in which she plays Johnny Cash's character's zealous wife, Barnaby Jones (1974), The Streets of San Francisco, Ellery Queen (1975), Police Woman (1975), and Charlie's Angels (1977). Her final acting appearance was in the 1979 film My Boys Are Good Boys.

Lupino has two distinctions with The Twilight Zone series, as the only woman to have directed an episode ("The Masks") and the only person to have worked as both actor for one episode ("The Sixteen-Millimeter Shrine"), and director for another.

== Themes ==
Lupino's Filmakers movies deal with unconventional and controversial subject matter that studio producers would not touch, including out-of-wedlock pregnancy, bigamy, and rape. She described her independent work as "films that had social significance and yet were entertainment ... based on true stories, things the public could understand because they had happened or been of news value." She focused on women's issues for many of her films and she liked strong characters, "[Not] women who have masculine qualities about them, but [a role] that has intestinal fortitude, some guts to it."

In the film The Bigamist, the two women characters represent the career woman and the homemaker. The title character is married to a woman (Joan Fontaine) who, unable to have children, has devoted her energy to her career. While on one of many business trips, he meets a waitress (Lupino) with whom he has a child, and then marries her. Marsha Orgeron, in her book Hollywood Ambitions, describes these characters as "struggling to figure out their place in environments that mirror the social constraints that Lupino faced". However, Donati, in his biography of Lupino, said "The solutions to the character's problems within the films were often conventional, even conservative, more reinforcing the 1950s' ideology than undercutting it."

Ahead of her time within the studio system, Lupino was intent on creating films that were rooted in reality. On Never Fear, Lupino said, "People are tired of having the wool pulled over their eyes. They pay out good money for their theatre tickets and they want something in return. They want realism. And you can't be realistic with the same glamorous mugs on the screen all the time."

Director Martin Scorsese noted that, "As a star, Lupino had no taste for glamour, and the same was true as a director. The stories she told in Outrage, Never Fear, Hard, Fast and Beautiful, The Bigamist and The Hitch-Hiker were intimate, always set within a precise social milieu: she wanted to "do pictures with poor, bewildered people, because that's what we are." Her heroines were young women whose middle-class security was shattered by trauma – unwanted pregnancy, polio, rape, bigamy, parental abuse. There's a sense of pain, panic and cruelty that colors every frame."

Lupino rejected the commodification of female stars, and as an actress she resisted becoming an object of desire. She said in 1949, "Hollywood careers are perishable commodities", and sought to avoid such a fate for herself.

== Personal life ==
=== Health ===
Lupino was diagnosed with polio in 1934. The New York Times reported that the outbreak of polio within the Hollywood community was due to contaminated swimming pools. She recovered and eventually directed, produced, and wrote many films, including a film loosely based upon her travails with polio titled Never Fear in 1949, the first film that she was credited for directing (she had earlier stepped in for an ill director on Not Wanted and refused directorial credit out of respect for her colleague). Her experience with the disease gave her the courage to focus on her intellectual abilities over simply her physical appearance. In an interview with Hollywood, she said, "I realized that my life and my courage and my hopes did not lie in my body. If that body was paralyzed, my brain could still work industriously...If I weren't able to act, I would be able to write. Even if I weren't able to use a pencil or typewriter, I could dictate." Film magazines from the 1930s and 1940s, such as The Hollywood Reporter and Motion Picture Daily, frequently published updates on her condition. Lupino worked for various nonprofit organizations to raise funds for polio research.

Lupino's interests outside the entertainment industry included writing short stories and children's books, and composing music. Her composition "Aladdin's Suite" was performed by the Los Angeles Philharmonic Orchestra in 1937. She composed it while recovering from polio in 1935.

=== Citizenship ===
She became an American citizen in June 1948.

=== Politics ===
She supported the presidency of John F. Kennedy.

=== Marriages ===
Lupino was married and divorced three times. She married actor Louis Hayward in November 1938. They separated in May 1944 and divorced in May 1945.

Her second marriage was to producer Collier Young on 5 August 1948. They divorced in 1951. When Lupino filed for divorce in September that year, she was already pregnant from an affair with future husband Howard Duff. The child was born seven months after she filed for divorce from Young.

Lupino's third and final marriage was to actor Howard Duff, whom she wed on 21 October 1951. Six months later, they had a daughter, Bridget, on 23 April 1952. They separated in 1966 and divorced in 1983.

She petitioned a California court in 1984 to appoint her business manager, Mary Ann Anderson, as her conservator due to poor business dealings from her prior business management company and her long separation from Howard Duff.

== Death ==
Lupino died from a stroke while undergoing treatment for colon cancer in Los Angeles on 3 August 1995, at the age of 77. Her memoirs, Ida Lupino: Beyond the Camera, were edited after her death and published by Mary Ann Anderson.

== Influences and legacy ==
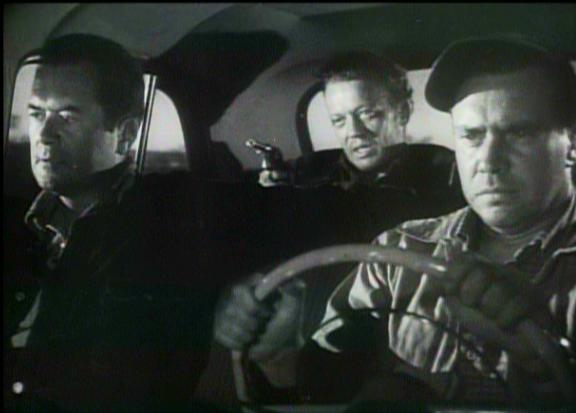
Ida Lupino's The Hitch-Hiker (1953) was the first American film noir directed by a woman.

Lupino learned filmmaking from everyone she observed on set, including William Ziegler, the cameraman for Not Wanted. When in preproduction on Never Fear, she conferred with Michael Gordon on directorial technique, organization, and plotting. Cinematographer Archie Stout said of Ms. Lupino, "Ida has more knowledge of camera angles and lenses than any director I've ever worked with, with the exception of Victor Fleming. She knows how a woman looks on the screen and what light that woman should have, probably better than I do." Lupino also worked with editor Stanford Tischler, who said of her, "She wasn't the kind of director who would shoot something, then hope any flaws could be fixed in the cutting room. The acting was always there, to her credit."

Author Ally Acker compares Lupino to pioneering silent-film director Lois Weber for their focus on controversial, socially relevant topics. With their ambiguous endings, Lupino's films never offered simple solutions for her troubled characters, and Acker finds parallels to her storytelling style in the work of the modern European "New Wave" directors, such as Margarethe von Trotta.

Film critic Ronnie Scheib, who issued a Kino release of three of Lupino's films, likens Lupino's themes and directorial style to directors Nicholas Ray, Sam Fuller, and Robert Aldrich, saying, "Lupino very much belongs to that generation of modernist filmmakers." On whether Lupino should be considered a feminist filmmaker, Scheib states, "I don't think Lupino was concerned with showing strong people, men or women. She often said that she was interested in lost, bewildered people, and I think she was talking about the postwar trauma of people who couldn't go home again."

Martin Scorsese calls Lupino's thematic film work "essential", noting that "What is at stake in Lupino's films is the psyche of the victim. [Her films] addressed the wounded soul and traced the slow, painful process of women trying to wrestle with despair and reclaim their lives. Her work is resilient, with a remarkable empathy for the fragile and the heart-broken."

Author Richard Koszarski noted Lupino's choice to play with gender roles regarding women's film stereotypes during the studio era: "Her films display the obsessions and consistencies of a true auteur... In her films The Bigamist and The Hitch-Hiker, Lupino was able to reduce the male to the same sort of dangerous, irrational force that women represented in most male-directed examples of Hollywood film noir."

Lupino did not consider herself a feminist, saying, "I had to do something to fill up my time between contracts. Keeping a feminine approach is vital – men hate bossy females ... Often I pretended to a cameraman to know less than I did. That way I got more cooperation." Village Voice writer Carrie Rickey, though, holds Lupino up as a model of modern feminist filmmaking: "Not only did Lupino take control of production, direction, and screenplay, but [also] each of her movies addresses the brutal repercussions of sexuality, independence and dependence." By 1972, Lupino said she wished more women were hired as directors and producers in Hollywood, noting that only very powerful actresses or writers had the chance to work in the field. She directed or costarred a number of times with young, fellow British actresses on a similar journey of developing their American film careers like Hayley Mills and Pamela Franklin.

Actress Bea Arthur, best remembered for her work in Maude and The Golden Girls, was motivated to escape her stifling hometown by following in Lupino's footsteps and becoming an actress, saying, "My dream was to become a very small blonde movie star like Ida Lupino and those other women I saw up there on the screen during the Depression."

Eddie Muller is a fan:

Although her ambition exceeded her achievements, she left a body of work that proved her to be a capable director, a good writer, an excellent producer, and a superior actress. Most important, she was a total pro, and the most multitalented woman in the history of Hollywood.

== Accolades ==
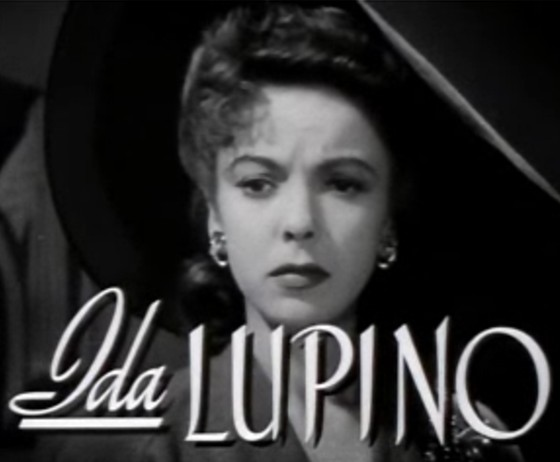
The Hard Way (1943)

- Lupino has two stars on the Hollywood Walk of Fame for contributions to the fields of television and film – located at 1724 Vine Street and 6821 Hollywood Boulevard.
- New York Film Critics Circle Award – Best Actress, The Hard Way, 1943
- Inaugural Saturn Award - Best Supporting Actress, The Devil's Rain, 1975
- A Commemorative Blue Plaque is dedicated to Lupino and her father Stanley Lupino by The Music Hall Guild of Great Britain and America and the Theatre and Film Guild of Great Britain and America at the house where she was born in Herne Hill, London, 16 February 2016
- Composer Carla Bley paid tribute to Lupino with her jazz composition "Ida Lupino" in 1964.
- The Hitch-Hiker and Outrage were inducted into the National Film Registry in 1998 and 2020 respectively.
- Starring Ida Lupino, a series on the Criterion Channel in November 2024 starts with Lupino's story, followed by several of her films.

== Filmography ==
Selected credits as actress and/or director
Title	Year	As actress	Role	As director	Notes
The Love Race	1931	Yes	Minor supporting role		Uncredited
Her First Affaire	1932	Yes	Ann Brent		
Money for Speed	1933	Yes	Jane		
I Lived with You	1933	Yes	Ada Wallis		
Prince of Arcadia	1933	Yes	The Princess		
The Ghost Camera	1933	Yes	Mary Elton		
High Finance	1933	Yes	Jill		
Search for Beauty	1934	Yes	Barbara Hilton		
Come On Marines!	1934	Yes	Esther Smith-Hamilton		
Ready for Love	1934	Yes	Marigold Tate		
Paris in Spring	1935	Yes	Mignon de Charelle		
Smart Girl	1935	Yes	Pat Reynolds		
Peter Ibbetson	1935	Yes	Agnes		
La Fiesta de Santa Barbara	1935	Yes	Herself		Short film made in Technicolor, with several celebrities appearing as themselves
Anything Goes	1936	Yes	Hope Harcourt		
One Rainy Afternoon	1936	Yes	Monique Pelerin		
Yours for the Asking	1936	Yes	Gert Malloy		
The Gay Desperado	1936	Yes	Jane		
Sea Devils	1937	Yes	Doris Malone		
Let's Get Married	1937	Yes	Paula Quinn		
Artists and Models	1937	Yes	Paula Sewell / Paula Monterey		
Fight for Your Lady	1937	Yes	Marietta		
The Lone Wolf Spy Hunt	1939	Yes	Val Carson		
The Lady and the Mob	1939	Yes	Lila Thorne		
The Adventures of Sherlock Holmes	1939	Yes	Ann Brandon		
The Light That Failed	1939	Yes	Bessie Broke		
Screen Snapshots Series 18, No. 6	1939	Yes	Herself		Promotional short film
They Drive by Night	1940	Yes	Lana Carlsen		
High Sierra	1941	Yes	Marie		
The Sea Wolf	1941	Yes	Ruth Webster		
Out of the Fog	1941	Yes	Stella Goodwin		
Ladies in Retirement	1941	Yes	Ellen Creed		
Moontide	1942	Yes	Anna		
Life Begins at Eight-Thirty	1942	Yes	Kathy Thomas		
The Hard Way	1943	Yes	Mrs. Helen Chernen		New York Film Critics Circle Award for Best Actress
Forever and a Day	1943	Yes	Jenny		
Thank Your Lucky Stars	1943	Yes	Herself		
In Our Time	1944	Yes	Jennifer Whittredge		
Hollywood Canteen	1944	Yes	Herself		
Pillow to Post	1945	Yes	Jean Howard		
Devotion	1946	Yes	Emily Brontë		
The Man I Love	1947	Yes	Petey Brown		
Deep Valley	1947	Yes	Libby Saul		
Escape Me Never	1947	Yes	Gemma Smith		
Road House	1948	Yes	Lily Stevens		
Lust for Gold	1949	Yes	Julia Thomas		
Not Wanted	1949			Yes	Uncredited (completed film started by Elmer Clifton); also co-writer, producer
Never Fear	1950			Yes	also co-writer, producer
Woman in Hiding	1950	Yes	Deborah Chandler Clark		
Outrage	1950	Yes	Country Dance Attendee	Yes	Uncredited cameo as actress
Hard, Fast and Beautiful	1951	Yes	Seabright Tennis Match Supervisor	Yes	Uncredited cameo as actress
On the Loose	1951	Yes	Narrator		Voice, Uncredited
On Dangerous Ground	1952	Yes	Mary Malden		
Beware, My Lovely	1952	Yes	Mrs. Helen Gordon		
The Hitch-Hiker	1953			Yes	also co-writer
Jennifer	1953	Yes	Agnes Langley		
The Bigamist	1953	Yes	Phyllis Martin	Yes	
Private Hell 36	1954	Yes	Lilli Marlowe		also co-writer
Women's Prison	1955	Yes	Amelia van Zandt		
The Big Knife	1955	Yes	Marion Castle		
While the City Sleeps	1956	Yes	Mildred Donner		
Strange Intruder	1956	Yes	Alice Carmichael		
Teenage Idol	1958	Yes			TV movie
The Trouble with Angels	1966			Yes	
Women in Chains	1972	Yes	Claire Tyson		TV movie
Deadhead Miles	1972	Yes	Herself		
Junior Bonner	1972	Yes	Elvira Bonner		
The Strangers in 7A	1972	Yes	Iris Sawyer		TV movie
Female Artillery	1973	Yes	Martha Lindstrom		TV movie
I Love a Mystery	1973	Yes	Randolph Cheyne		TV movie
The Letters	1973	Yes	Mrs. Forrester		TV movie
The Devil's Rain	1975	Yes	Mrs. Preston		Saturn Award for Best Supporting Actress
The Food of the Gods	1976	Yes	Mrs. Skinner		
My Boys Are Good Boys	1978	Yes	Mrs. Morton		Final film role

== Television credits ==
As actress and/or director
Title	Year	As actress	Role	As director	Episode
The Ford Television Theatre	1954	Yes	Petra Manning		"Marriageable Male" episode aired Feb 25, 1954
Mr. Adams and Eve	1957–1958	Yes	Eve Adams/Eve Drake	Yes	Main cast (66 episodes); 1 episode 1958
The Twilight Zone	1959	Yes	Barbara Jean Trenton		"The Sixteen-Millimeter Shrine"
Bonanza	1959	Yes	Annie O'Toole		"The Saga of Annie O'Toole"
Lucy-Desi Comedy Hour	1959	Yes	Herself		"Lucy's Summer Vacation"
Death Valley Days	1960	Yes	Pamela Mann		"Pamela's Oxen"
The Rifleman	1961			Yes	"Assault"
Thriller	1961			Yes	"The Last of the Sommervilles"
The Investigators	1961	Yes			"Something for Charity"
Kraft Suspense Theatre	1963	Yes	Harriet Whitney		"One Step Down"
The Virginian	1963	Yes	Helen Blaine		"A Distant Fury"
The Twilight Zone	1964			Yes	"The Masks"
Gilligan's Island	1964			Yes	"Goodnight, Sweet Skipper"
Gilligan's Island	1964			Yes	"Wrongway Feldman"
Bewitched	1965			Yes	"A is for Aardvark"
Honey West	1965			Yes	"How Brillig, O, Beamish Boy"
Gilligan's Island	1966			Yes	"The Producer"
It Takes A Thief	1968	Yes	Doctor Schneider		"Turnabout"
Batman	1968	Yes	"Doctor Cassandra" Spellcraft		"The Entrancing Dr. Cassandra"
Family Affair	1969	Yes	Lady "Maudie" Marchwood		"Maudie"
Family Affair	1970	Yes	Lady "Maudie" Marchwood		"Return of Maudie"
Columbo	1972	Yes	Roger Stanford's Aunt		"Short Fuse"
The Streets of San Francisco	1973	Yes	Wilma Jamison		"Blockade"
Columbo	1974	Yes	Mrs. Edna Brown		"Swan Song"
Police Woman	1975	Yes	Hilda Morris		"The Chasers"
Charlie's Angels	1977	Yes	Gloria Gibson		"I Will Be Remembered"

== Radio appearances ==
Year	Program	Episode/source
1937	The Chase and Sanborn Hour	
1937	Lux Radio Theatre	The 39 Steps
1938	The Silver Theatre	Challenge for Three
1939	The Campbell Playhouse	The Bad Man
1939	The Chase and Sanborn Hour	
1939	Lux Radio Theatre	Wuthering Heights
1939	Woodbury's Hollywood Playhouse	For All Our Lives
1940	Lux Radio Theatre	The Young in Heart
1940	Good News of 1940	The Light That Failed
1940	Lux Radio Theatre	Wuthering Heights
1940	Lux Radio Theatre	Rebecca
1942	Charlie McCarthy Show	
1942	It's Time to Smile	
1942	Lux Radio Theatre	A Woman's Face
1943	Lux Radio Theatre	Now, Voyager
1943	Lux Radio Theatre	Ladies in Retirement
1943	Duffy's Tavern	
1943	Command Performance	
1943	Burns and Allen	
1944	Everything for the Boys	The Citadel
1944	Mail Call	
1944	Screen Guild Players	High Sierra
1944	Suspense	The Sisters
1944	Suspense	Fugue in C Minor
1944	This Is My Best	Brighton Rock
1945	Cavalcade of America	Immortal Wife
1945	Lux Radio Theatre	Only Yesterday
1945	Screen Guild Players	Pillow to Post
1946	Cavalcade of America	Star in the West
1946	Theatre of Romance	The Hard Way
1946	Encore Theatre	Nurse Edith Cavell
1946	Tell Me a Story	The Pond
1947	Cavalcade of America	Abigail Opens the White House
1947	Cavalcade of America	A Lady of Distinction
1947	Cavalcade of America	Kitchen Scientist
1947	Lux Radio Theatre	The Seventh Veil
1947	Lux Radio Theatre	Saratoga Trunk
1948	Lux Radio Theatre	Daisy Kenyon
1948	Suspense	Summer Night
1948	Lux Radio Theatre	The Razor's Edge
1948	Hallmark Playhouse	Woman with a Sword
1949	Bill Stern Colgate Sports Newsreel	
1949	Suspense	The Bullet
1950	Hollywood Calling	
1950	Hallmark Playhouse	The Love Story of Elizabeth Barrett
1953	Guest Star	Fear
1953	Stars over Hollywood	Chasten Thy Son
1954	Lux Radio Theatre	The Star
1954	Lux Radio Theatre	So Big
1959	Suspense	On a Country Road

== See also ==
- Lupino family
