= Never Fear =

1950 film by Ida Lupino

- Directed by: Ida Lupino
- Written by: Ida Lupino; Collier Young
- Produced by: Collier Young
- Starring: Sally Forrest; Keefe Brasselle; Hugh O'Brian
- Cinematography: Archie Stout
- Edited by: Harvey Manger; William H. Ziegler
- Music by: Leith Stevens
- Production company: The Filmakers
- Distributed by: Eagle-Lion Films
- Release date: January 1950
- Running time: 81-82 minutes
- Country: United States
- Language: English
- Budget: $151,000

Never Fear, also known as The Young Lovers, is a 1950 American drama film directed and co-written by Ida Lupino, and produced by Lupino and Collier Young. It stars Sally Forrest, Keefe Brasselle, and Hugh O'Brian.

== Plot ==
Carol Williams is a beautiful young dancer with a promising career who is crippled by polio. Her dance partner and fiancé Guy Richards wants to see her through her illness, but Carol prefers to endure her recovery alone. Carol's father takes her to the Kabat-Kaiser Institute for rehabilitation, where she meets fellow patients in recovery. By allowing others to share her grief, Carol is able to pull herself together and go on with her life.

== Cast ==
- Sally Forrest as Carol Williams
- Keefe Brasselle as Guy Richards
- Hugh O'Brian as Len Randall
- Eve Miller as Phyllis Townsend
- Lawrence Dobkin as Dr. Middleton
- Rita Lupino as Josie
- Herb Butterfield as Walter Williams
- Kevin O'Morrison as Red Dawson
- Stanley Waxman as Dr. Taylor
- Jerry Hausner as Mr. Brownlee
- John Franco as Carlos

Cast notes
Rita Lupino was Ida Lupino's sister.

== Production ==
Never Fear was the first directorial credit for actress Ida Lupino, although an item in The New York Times reported that Frank Cavett was originally intended to direct. The film was also Hugh O'Brian's first credited film role. During the making of the film, the name of the production company of Lupino and Collier Young, her husband at the time, was changed from Emerald Productions to The Filmmakers. Lupino and Young used their own money and that of friends to raise the $151,000 they used to make the film; they did not approach the major studios for financing. As a result of their work, RKO gave Lupino and Young a nine-month contract as an independent production unit.

Lupino had contracted polio in 1934 and suffered the same fevers and pains as does the Carol Williams character, and she also faced the same dark thoughts and fear that she would not walk again. Lupino's major symptoms persisted for only a brief period of time, leaving her with minor problems in her leg and hand. She remained a supporter of causes to fight the disease, and Never Fear was released in 1949, the year with America's highest-ever recorded total of polio cases. During production, Lupino fell and broke her ankle, and made some use of a wheelchair while directing.

The rehabilitation scenes were shot at the Kabat-Kaiser Institute in Santa Monica, California. Many of the actors used were actual rehab patients at the institute, and a scene depicting a wheelchair square dance featured a group of real wheelchair dancers from Kabat-Kaiser.

The film was initially released as The Young Lovers and has also been titled They're Called Young Lovers, which may have been for a television release.

== Reception ==
The film was not popular because of its subject matter and did not turn a profit for The Filmakers, Lupino's and Young's production company.

A Variety review stated: "As written by Ida Lupino and Collier Young, the screenplay was psychologically sound in dealing with the emotional ups and downs of polio victims, and it is equally convincing as a documentary of treatment with effective shots of physical therapy."

== Songs ==
- "Why Pretend" - music by John Franco
- "Guaymas" - music and lyrics by John Franco and William Earley
