= Not Wanted =

1949 film by Elmer Clifton, Ida Lupino

- Directed by: Elmer Clifton; Ida Lupino (uncredited)
- Screenplay by: Paul Jarrico; Ida Lupino
- Story by: Paul Jarrico; Malvin Wald
- Produced by: Anson Bond; Ida Lupino
- Starring: Sally Forrest; Keefe Brasselle; Leo Penn
- Cinematography: Henry Freulich
- Edited by: William H. Ziegler
- Music by: Leith Stevens
- Production company: Emerald Productions
- Distributed by: Film Classics
- Release date: June 24, 1949
- Running time: 91 minutes
- Country: United States
- Language: English

Not Wanted is a 1949 American drama film directed by Elmer Clifton and an un-credited Ida Lupino and starring Sally Forrest, Keefe Brasselle and Leo Penn.

A few days after shooting started, Clifton suffered a heart attack. Lupino stepped in to direct the film (which she co-wrote and co-produced) without taking credit (this was the last film that Clifton worked on but not his final overall effort, as two films of his would be released after his death on October 15, 1949). The film's sets were designed by the art director Charles D. Hall. Shooting took place at the Universal Studios.

== Plot ==
A young woman is attracted to a travelling musician while feeling stifled at how her parents treat her. She abandons her home town to follow him but he has decided to move on to chase his dream career. After he has left, she finds out that she is pregnant and faces a decision over what to do about her impending baby. She gives the child away after giving birth but finds herself feeling guilty to the point where she snatches a child from a stroller. In the meantime, her employer at the gas station has fallen in love with her.

== Cast ==
- Sally Forrest as Sally Kelton
- Keefe Brasselle as Drew Baxter
- Leo Penn as Steve Ryan
- Dorothy Adams as Mrs. Aggie Kelton
- Wheaton Chambers as Mr. Kelton
- Rita Lupino as Joan
- Audrey Farr as Nancy
- Carole Donne as Jane
- Ruth Clifford as Mrs. Elizabeth Stone
- Ruthelma Stevens as Miss James
- Virginia Mullen as Mrs. Banning, Infant's mother
- Marie Harmon as Irene
- Roger Anderson as Bill Aikens
- Gregg Barton as Patrolman
- Charles Seel as Dr. Williams
- Lawrence Dobkin as Assistant District Attorney
- Patrick Whyte as Reverend Culbertson

== Critical reception ==
The film has been received positively by modern critics. It holds an 80% approval rating on Rotten Tomatoes, based on 5 reviews.

Richard Brody of The New Yorker in a glowing review lauded the film and Lupino's direction, writing,

Lupino displays a documentary avidity for the details of work and play. She conveys Sally’s unworldly, impractical passion with tender, intimate closeups and an intense, effects-driven subjectivity—a hallucinatory sequence in a hospital is a masterpiece of low-budget Expressionism. An incongruous yet majestic chase scene, highlighting a photogenic array of Los Angeles locations, projects the intimate melodrama onto the world stage.
