= A. H. Weiler =

American writer and film critic (1908–2002)

A.H. Weiler
- Born: December 10, 1908; Russian Empire
- Died: January 22, 2002 (aged 93); New York City, U.S.
- Other name: A.W.
- Occupations: Writer, film critic

Abraham H. Weiler (December 10, 1908 – January 22, 2002) was an American writer and critic best known for being a film critic and motion picture editor for The New York Times. He also served a term as chairman of the New York Film Critics Association.

Weiler was born in the Russian Empire in 1908 to Jewish parents, and died in Astoria, Queens, at the age of 93 in 2002. Writing for The New York Times for fifty years, he signed some of his reviews with the initials A.W.
