= Collier Young =

American film and television producer and writer

- Born: August 19, 1908; Asheville, North Carolina, US
- Died: December 25, 1980 (aged 72); Santa Monica, California, US
- Education: Dartmouth College
- Occupations: Screenwriter, film producer
- Spouses: Ida Lupino (m. 1948; div. 1951) Joan Fontaine (m. 1952; div. 1961)

Collier Hudson Young (August 19, 1908 – December 25, 1980) was an American film producer and writer, who worked on many films in the 1950s, before becoming a television producer for such shows as NBC's Ironside and CBS's The Wild, Wild West, as well as the supernatural anthology series One Step Beyond (1959–61).

== Early years ==
Young was born in Asheville, North Carolina, the son of Mr. and Mrs. William Tandy Young Sr., who in 1938 lived in Indianapolis, Indiana. His father was an attorney. Young was president of the senior class at Shortridge High School in Indianapolis, and in 1926 he was selected as "the Indiana boy most conspicuously embodying the highest ideals of American youth". While in high school he participated in oratorical competition, finishing first in state competition in 1926. In addition to the $500 first prize, he went on to represent Indiana in regional competition. He graduated from Dartmouth College in 1930.

== Career ==
Young began working as a story editor for RKO in 1940 after having been a literary agent and working in advertising. His experiences as a Navy lieutenant commander during World War II included making documentary films of South Pacific battles.

After Young worked as an executive at Columbia and Warner Bros., he and his then-wife Ida Lupino created a film production company in 1949, with the initial focus the making of six documentaries. In 1953 Young and Lupino created Filmakers Releasing Organization, a company to distribute films. They were the only stockholders in the company, which had outlets in 29 cities.

Young's film production credits included Outrage (1950) and The Hitch-Hiker (1953), both with Lupino as director. He produced the movies Huk! (1956) and The Halliday Brand (1957).

Young was executive director of her 1957–58 CBS sitcom Mr. Adams and Eve, co-starring Lupino's then-husband, Howard Duff. Elements of his screenplay for The Bigamist mined his serial relationships with Lupino and Fontaine, who played the deceived wives of that film.

He was creator of the long-running TV series Ironside, starring Raymond Burr. Young also produced the television show, The Rogues, in 1964–65, starring Charles Boyer, David Niven, Gig Young, Robert Coote, and Gladys Cooper. The Rogues won the Golden Globe award for "Best TV Show" in 1965.

== Personal life and death ==
Young was married to:

- Ruth Valerie Edmonds of Toronto, Canada, on March 8, 1938, in New York City. Their divorce became final in April 1948.
- actress and director Ida Lupino on August 5, 1948, in La Jolla, California. They were divorced in 1951
- actress Joan Fontaine from 1952 to 1961
- businesswoman and former model, Marjory Ann "Meg" Marsh, in 1965.

Young died on December 25, 1980, in St. John's Hospital and Medical Center in Santa Monica, California, after having been injured in an automobile accident several weeks earlier. He was 72.
