= Hugh O'Brian filmography =

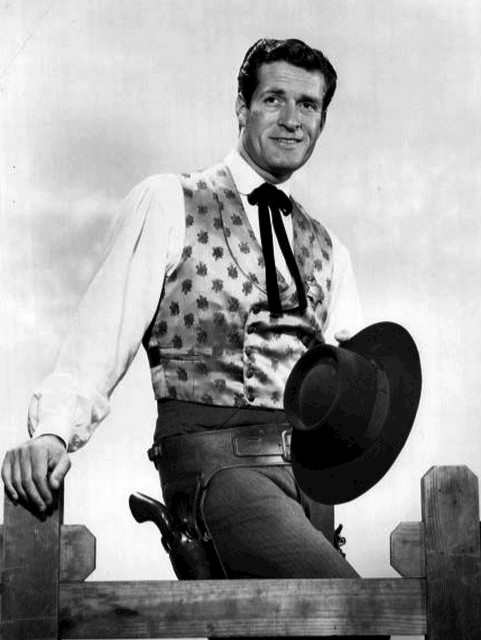
- O'Brian portrayed as Wyatt Earp in TV series The Life and Legend of Wyatt Earp (1955-61).
- Occupation: Actor
- Years active: 1948–2016

The filmography of Hugh O'Brian (April 19, 1925 – September 5, 2016) comprises both film and television roles. In a career spanning nearly seven decades, he has appeared in overall fifty-three feature films, sixteen television movies and forty-six series.

On screen, O'Brian debuted as Sailor in William Beaudine's drama Kidnapped (1948), while for television he made his debut in Arch Oboler's anthology series Oboler's Comedy Theatre (1949). In 1954, O'Brian won the Golden Globe as the Most Promising Newcomer - Male, while in 1957, he received a Primetime Emmy Award-nomination for Best Continuing Performance by an Actor in a Dramatic Series.

== Filmography ==
=== Film ===
Year	Title	Role	Notes
1948	Kidnapped	Sailor	Uncredited.
1949	D.O.A.	Jazz Fan	Uncredited.
1950	Never Fear	Len Randall	Also known as Young Lovers.
1950	Rocketship X-M	Harry Chamberlain	Also voice on loudspeaker.
1950	Beyond the Purple Hills	Jack Beaumont	
1950	The Return of Jesse James	Lem Younger	
1951	Vengeance Valley	Dick Fasken	
1951	Fighting Coast Guard	Tom Peterson	
1951	Buckaroo Sheriff of Texas	Ted Gately	
1951	Little Big Horn	Pvt. Al DeWalt	
1951	On the Loose	Dr. Phillips	
1951	Cave of Outlaws	Garth	
1952	The Cimarron Kid	Red Buck	
1952	The Battle at Apache Pass	Lt. Robert Harley	
1952	Red Ball Express	Pvt. Wilson	
1952	Sally and Saint Anne	Danny O'Moyne	
1952	Son of Ali Baba	Hussein	
1952	Yankee Buccaneer	Off-Screen Narrator	Uncredited.
1952	The Raiders	Hank Purvis	Also known as Riders of Vengeance.
1953	The Lawless Breed	Ike Hanley	
1953	Meet Me at the Fair	Chilton Corr	
1953	Seminole	Kajeck	
1953	The Man from the Alamo	Lt. Tom Lamar	Golden Globe for Most Promising Newcomer - Male.
1953	The Stand at Apache River	Tom Kenyon	
1953	Back to God's Country	Frank Hudson	
1954	Taza, Son of Cochise	Killed settler	Uncredited, voice role.
1954	Saskatchewan	Carl Smith	
1954	Playgirl	—	Voice double (Claude Stroud), uncredited.
1954	Fireman Save My Child	Smitty	
1954	Drums Across the River	Morgan	
1954	Broken Lance	Mike Devereaux	
1954	There's No Business Like Show Business	Charles Gibbs	
1955	White Feather	American Horse	
1955	The Twinkle in God's Eye	Marty Callahan	
1956	The Brass Legend	Sheriff Wade Addams	
1958	The Fiend Who Walked the West	Daniel Slade Hardy	
1959	Alias Jesse James	Wyatt Earp	Uncredited, cameo.
1963	Come Fly with Me	FO Ray Winsley	
1965	Love Has Many Faces	Hank Walker	
1965	In Harm's Way	USAAC major	Uncredited.
1965	Assassination in Rome	Dick Sherman	Also known as Il segreto del vestito rosso in Italy.
1965	Ten Little Indians	Hugh Lombard/ Charles Morley	
1966	Ambush Bay	1Sgt Steve Corey	
1967	Africa Texas Style	Jim Sinclair	Also known as Cowboy in Africa.
1969	Strategy of Terror	Det. Matt Lacey	Re-edited from a 1965 Kraft Suspense Theatre episode "In Darkness, Waiting".
1976	Killer Force	Lewis	
1976	The Shootist	Jack Pulford	
1978	Game of Death	Steiner	
1988	Doin' Time on Planet Earth	Richard Camalier	
1988	Twins	Granger	
1994	Wyatt Earp: Return to Tombstone	Wyatt Earp	Colorized footage from TV series The Life and Legend of Wyatt Earp with new scenes.

=== Television ===
Year	Title	Role	Notes
1949	Oboler Comedy Theater	—N/a	Series, episode: "Dog's Eye View".
1950	Fireside Theater	—N/a	Anthology, 4 episodes (1950–51).
1954	Hallmark Hall of Fame	Starbuck	Anthology, episode: "Moby Dick".
1954	Letter to Loretta	Various	Anthology, 4 episodes (1954–55).
1954	Studio 57	Giff Dillard	Anthology, 2 episodes (1954–55).
1955	The Millionaire	Luke Fortune	Anthology, episode: "The Luke Fortune Story".
1955	Stage 7	Billy the Kid	Anthology, episode: "Billy and the Bride"; credited as O'Brien.
1955	Damon Runyon Theater	Packy	Anthology, episode: "A Light in France".
1955	The Life and Legend of Wyatt Earp	Wyatt Earp	Series, 227 episodes (1955–61). Nominated—Primetime Emmy for Best Continuing Performance by an Actor in a Dramatic Series.
1955	Celebrity Playhouse	—N/a	Series, episode: "A Very Big Man".
1956	Make Room for Daddy	Wyatt Earp	Sitcom, episode: "Wyatt Earp Visits the Williamses".
1956	The Star and the Story	Hank Bartlett	Anthology, episode: "Arab Duel".
1956	Matinee Theater	—N/a	Anthology, episode: "Tall, Dark Stranger".
1957	The Ford Television Theatre	Matty Curran	Anthology, episode: "Ringside Seat".
1957	Playhouse 90	Various	Anthology, 2 episodes (1957–58).
1957	The Christophers	—N/a	Series, episode: "As You Make It".
1957	Date with the Angels	Himself	Sitcom, episode: "Star Struck"; credited as O'Brien.
1959	Westinghouse Desilu Playhouse	Various	Anthology, 2 episodes (1959–60).
1960	The Secret World of Eddie Hodges	Wyatt Earp	Musical
1960	General Electric Theater	Sam Sharp	Anthology, episode: "The Graduation Dress".
1961	Sunday Showcase	John Honeyman	Anthology, episode: "Our American Heritage: The Secret Rebel".
1961	The Play of the Week	—N/a	Anthology, episode: "The Wingless Victory".
1961	Feathertop	Feathertop	Musical
1961	The Dick Powell Show	Jack Farmer	Anthology, episode: "Up Jumped the Devil".
1962	Theatre '62	—N/a	Series, episode: "Spellbound".
1962	Alcoa Premiere	Miles Hadley	Series, episode: "The Rules of the Game".
1962	The Virginian	Paul Taylor	Series, pilot: ""The Executioners".
1962	Kraft Mystery Theatre	Various	Anthology, 2 episodes (1962–63).
1962	The Alfred Hitchcock Hour	Christopher Martin/ Chris Phillips	Anthology, Season 1 Episode 11: "Ride the Nightmare".
1963	Perry Mason	Bruce Jason/ Conrad Bucola	Court show, episode: "The Case of the Two-Faced Turn-a-bout".
1963	The Greatest Show on Earth	Garve	Series, episode: "Garve".
1964	Bob Hope Presents the Chrysler Theatre	Various	Anthology, 2 episodes (1964–65).
1964	Vacation Playhouse	Sam Sharp	Series, episode: "The Graduation Dress".
1965	Kraft Suspense Theatre	Det. Matt Lacey	Anthology, 2-part episode: "In Darkness, Waiting".
1965	The Red Skelton Show	Count Mustache	Variety show, episode: "Lookie, Lookie, Here Comes Cookie".
1966	Preview Tonight	Joseph	Series, episode: "Great Bible Adventures: Seven Rich Years and Seven Lean"
1967	Dial M for Murder	Mark Halliday	
1968	A Punt, a Pass, and a Prayer	Johnny Aragon	
1970	Wild Women	Killian	
1970	Swing Out, Sweet Land	Thomas Jefferson	
1971	Harpy	Peter Clune	
1972	Probe	Hugh Lockwood	
1972	Search	Hugh Lockwood	Series, 23 episodes (1972–73).
1973	Police Story	Various	Series, 3 episodes (1973–77).
1975	Murder on Flight 502	Det. Daniel Myerson	
1976	Good Heavens	—N/a	Anthology, episode: "A Night with Brockton".
1976	Charlie's Angels	Tony Mann	Series, episode: "Lady Killer".
1977	Benny and Barney: Las Vegas Undercover	Jack Davis	
1977	Fantasy Island	Various	Series, 5 episodes ( 1977–82).
1977	Murder at the World Series	The Governor	
1978	Cruise Into Terror	Andy - Captain	
1978	Greatest Heroes of the Bible	Abner	Series, episode: "David & Goliath".
1979	The Seekers	Andrew Piggot	
1982	Bush Doctor	Dr. Robert Maxell	
1982	The Love Boat	Gabriel	Series, episode: "April in Boston / Saving Grace / Breaks of Life".
1982	Matt Houston	Thom 'Buck' McCune	Series, episode: "The Kidnapping".
1989	Paradise	Wyatt Earp	Series, 2 episodes.
1990	Gunsmoke: The Last Apache	Nelson Miles	
1990	Murder, She Wrote	Fred Keppard	Series, episode: "A Body to Die For".
1991	The Gambler Returns: The Luck of the Draw	Wyatt Earp	
1993	L.A. Law	Raymond Holtz	Series, episode: "Odor in the Court".
2000	Call of the Wild	Older Miles	Series, pilot 2-part episode.
