= List of The Life and Legend of Wyatt Earp episodes =

The Life and Legend of Wyatt Earp is the first Western television series written for adults, premiering four days before Gunsmoke on September 6, 1955. Two weeks later came the Clint Walker western Cheyenne. The series is loosely based on the life of frontier marshal Wyatt Earp. The half-hour, black-and-white program aired for six seasons (226 episodes) on ABC from 1955 to 1961, with Hugh O'Brian in the title role.

== Series overview ==
Season	Episodes	Originally released		Rank	Average viewership (in millions)
Season	Episodes	First released	Last released	Rank	Average viewership (in millions)
1	33	September 6, 1955	April 17, 1956	Not in top 30	N/A
2	39	August 18, 1956	June 4, 1957	18	12.0
3	39	September 17, 1957	June 10, 1958	6	13.7
4	37	September 16, 1958	May 26, 1959	10	12.8
5	41	September 1, 1959	June 7, 1960	20	11.4
6	37	September 27, 1960	June 27, 1961	Not in top 30	N/A

== Episodes ==
=== Season 1 (1955–56) ===
No. overall	No. in season	Title	Directed by	Written by	Original release date
1	1	"Wyatt Earp Becomes a Marshal"	Lewis R. Foster	Frederick Hazlitt Brennan	September 6, 1955
2	2	"Mr. Earp Meets a Lady"	Frank McDonald	Frederick Hazlitt Brennan	September 13, 1955
3	3	"Bill Thompson Gives In"	Frank McDonald	Frederick Hazlitt Brennan	September 20, 1955
4	4	"Marshal Earp Meets General Lee"	Frank McDonald	Frederick Hazlitt Brennan	September 27, 1955
5	5	"Wyatt Earp Comes to Wichita"	Frank McDonald	Frederick Hazlitt Brennan	October 4, 1955
6	6	"The Man Who Lied"	Frank McDonald	Frederick Hazlitt Brennan	October 11, 1955
7	7	"The Gambler"	Frank McDonald	Frederick Hazlitt Brennan	October 18, 1955
8	8	"The Killer"	Frank McDonald	Frederick Hazlitt Brennan	October 25, 1955
9	9	"John Wesley Hardin"	Frank McDonald	Story by : Frank Gruber; Teleplay by : Frederick Hazlitt Brennan	November 1, 1955
The outlaw John Wesley Hardin (Phillip Pine) arrives in Wichita to avenge Earp for having run out of a town a friend of Hardin's. Hardin unveils tricks he has learned with his revolvers. Earp is suspicious when Hardin kills a man in the saloon who drew first according to witnesses. Hardin's wife, Jane Hardin (Barbara Bestar), encourages him to head north to Nebraska.
10	10	"The Bank Robbers"	Unknown	Unknown	November 8, 1955
11	11	"King of the Cattle Trails"	Unknown	Unknown	November 15, 1955
12	12	"The Big Baby Contest"	Unknown	Unknown	November 22, 1955
13	13	"Frontier Journalism Was Fearless"	Unknown	Unknown	November 29, 1955
14	14	"Trail's End for a Cowboy"	Unknown	Unknown	December 6, 1955
15	15	"Rich Man's Son"	Unknown	Unknown	December 13, 1955
16	16	"The Buntline Special"	Frank McDonald	Dan Ullman	December 20, 1955
17	17	"Ben Thompson Returns"	Unknown	Unknown	December 27, 1955
18	18	"Marshal Earp Plays Cupid"	Unknown	Unknown	January 3, 1956
19	19	"The Assassins"	Frank McDonald	Dan Ullman	January 10, 1956
20	20	"A Wise Calf"	Unknown	Unknown	January 17, 1956
21	21	"Mr. Cousin and Mr. Brother"	Unknown	Unknown	January 24, 1956
22	22	"The Bribe"	Unknown	Unknown	January 31, 1956
23	23	"The Frontier Theatre"	Unknown	Unknown	February 7, 1956
24	24	"Killing at Cowskin Creek"	Unknown	Unknown	February 14, 1956
25	25	"The Englishman"	Unknown	Unknown	February 21, 1956
26	26	"The Desperate Half-Hour"	Unknown	Unknown	February 28, 1956
Lonnie McVey (Barry Truex), the young outlaw called the Kansas Kid, returns to his parents' home in Wichita for refuge. Earp learns that the Kid is wanted for robbery, but not murder as claimed by a sheriff (Trevor Bardette). John McVey (George Chandler) is the Kansas Kid's discouraged father.
27	27	"The Necktie Party"	Unknown	Unknown	March 6, 1956
28	28	"One of Jesse's Gang"	Unknown	Unknown	March 13, 1956
Ann Drew (Angie Dickinson) slips a gun to her jailed husband, Harry (John Craven), a former associate of the Jesse James gang. Having vowed never to return to prison, Harry is killed while escaping.
29	29	"The Pinkertons"	Unknown	Unknown	March 20, 1956
Detective agency head Allan Pinkerton (Douglas Evans) is seeking to recover $40,000 in stolen money, but interferes with Marshal Earp's attempt to catch the entire gang of Crummy Newton (Richard Alexander).
30	30	"The Suffragette"	Unknown	Unknown	March 27, 1956
Linda Stirling plays Joan Laramie in this episode, a story about woman's suffrage in the American West. In this 1956 episode, Marshal Earp, who admits his sympathy with the suffragettes, tries to keep the peace between the women and the supporters of a Kansas state senator who leads the opposition.
31	31	"Hunt the Man Down"	Unknown	Unknown	April 3, 1956
32	32	"The War of the Colonels"	Unknown	Unknown	April 10, 1956
33	33	"Bat Masterson Again"	Unknown	Unknown	April 17, 1956

=== Season 2 (1956–57) ===
No. overall	No. in season	Title	Original release date
34	1	"Wichita Is Civilized"	August 18, 1956
35	2	"Dodge City Gets a New Marshal"	September 4, 1956
36	3	"Fight or Run"	September 11, 1956
37	4	"The Double Life of Dora Hand"	September 18, 1956
38	5	"Clay Allison"	September 25, 1956
39	6	"Wyatt's Love Affair"	October 2, 1956
40	7	"A Quiet Day in Dodge City"	October 9, 1956
41	8	"The Almost Dead Cowhand"	October 23, 1956
42	9	"The Reformation of Jim Kelley"	October 30, 1956
43	10	"So Long, Dora, So Long"	November 13, 1956
44	11	"Bat Masterson Wins His Star"	November 20, 1956
45	12	"The Lonesomest Man in the World"	November 27, 1956
46	13	"Take Back Your Town"	December 4, 1956
47	14	"Nineteen Notches on His Gun"	December 11, 1956
48	15	"The Hanging Judge"	December 18, 1956
49	16	"Justice"	December 25, 1956
50	17	"Shootin' Woman"	January 1, 1957
51	18	"The Man Who Rode with Custer"	January 8, 1957
52	19	"Wyatt and the Captain"	January 15, 1957
53	20	"Witness for the Defense"	January 22, 1957
54	21	"The Sharpshooter"	January 29, 1957
55	22	"Siege at Little Alamo"	February 5, 1957
56	23	"Vengeance Trail"	February 12, 1957
57	24	"Command Performance"	February 19, 1957
58	25	"They Hired Some Guns"	February 26, 1957
59	26	"Bat Masterson for Sheriff"	March 5, 1957
60	27	"Hang 'Em High"	March 12, 1957
In this episode, Earp and Masterson (as the newly elected sheriff of Ford County) tangle with secreted vigilantes called the White Caps after a judge orders the hanging of Dal Royal (Darryl Hickman), who refuses to defend himself in court for fear the gang will murder his girlfriend, the daughter of a prominent rancher. The story line includes a fake hanging and burial to smoke out the gang.
61	28	"The Vultures"	March 19, 1957
62	29	"Young Gun"	March 26, 1957
63	30	"The Nice Ones Always Die First"	April 2, 1957
64	31	"Old Jake"	April 9, 1957
65	32	"The Equalizer"	April 16, 1957
66	33	"Wyatt Meets Doc Holliday"	April 23, 1957
67	34	"Beautiful Friendship"	April 30, 1957
68	35	"Dull Knife Strikes for Freedom"	May 7, 1957
Actor Ian MacDonald played Dull Knife, a Cheyenne chief, in this episode. In the story line, Dull Knife leads his tribe from its reservation in Oklahoma Territory to their homeland in Montana, to which they claim the U.S. government had promised them. Steve Pendleton appeared as Army Major Benteen. Pendleton also appeared in four additional series episodes as Benteen and in seven others as Thacker.
69	36	"The Gold Brick"	May 14, 1957
70	37	"The Wicked Widow"	May 21, 1957
In this episode, Earp investigates a series of mysterious shootings near the home of Myra Malone (played by Gloria Saunders), a widowed dressmaker. He finds that Myra is harboring Nettie Barnes (Lyn Guild), a wanted member of the Larson gang and former Confederate who dislikes northern law.
71	38	"They Think They're Immortal"	May 28, 1957
72	39	"The Time for All Good Men"	June 4, 1957

=== Season 3 (1957–58) ===
No. overall	No. in season	Title	Original release date
73	1	"Call Me Your Honor"	September 17, 1957
74	2	"The Big Bellyache"	September 24, 1957
75	3	"Pinkytown"	October 1, 1957
76	4	"Shoot to Kill"	October 8, 1957
77	5	"Wells Fargo vs. Doc Holliday"	October 15, 1957
78	6	"Warpath"	October 22, 1957
79	7	"Hung Jury"	October 29, 1957
80	8	"Little Pistol"	November 5, 1957
81	9	"The Magic Puddle"	November 12, 1957
82	10	"Mr. Buntline's Vacation"	November 19, 1957
83	11	"Fortitude"	November 26, 1957
84	12	"The Good and Perfect Gift"	December 3, 1957
85	13	"Indian Wife"	December 10, 1957
86	14	"Woman Trouble"	December 17, 1957
In this episode, Earp encounters a group of outlaws posing as True Light missionaries, who dispatch a young woman named Jennie Brandt (Nancy Hadley) into Dodge City to seek Earp's affection and to learn the details of a pending Wells Fargo gold shipment. Earp, however, has done his homework on the True Light movement and detects that something is amiss.
87	15	"Shadow of a Man"	December 24, 1957
88	16	"Bad Woman"	December 31, 1957
89	17	"One-Man Army"	January 7, 1958
90	18	"The General's Lady"	January 14, 1958
91	19	"The Manly Art"	January 21, 1958
92	20	"Sweet Revenge"	January 28, 1958
93	21	"The Imitation Jesse James"	February 4, 1958
94	22	"The Kansas Lily"	February 11, 1958
95	23	"Wyatt Earp Rides Shotgun"	February 18, 1958
96	24	"Wyatt Fights"	February 25, 1958
97	25	"Ballad and Truth"	March 4, 1958
98	26	"The Schoolteacher"	March 11, 1958
99	27	"When Sherman Marched Through Kansas"	March 18, 1958
100	28	"Big Brother Virgil"	March 25, 1958
101	29	"It Had to Happen"	April 1, 1958
102	30	"County Seat War"	April 8, 1958
103	31	"One"	April 15, 1958
104	32	"The Underdog"	April 22, 1958
105	33	"Two"	April 29, 1958
106	34	"Doc Holliday Rewrites History"	May 6, 1958
In this episode, Professor Jordan, a traveling photographer and historian (Robert Nichols) arrives in Dodge City to take pictures and write the biographies of interested citizens, who pay in advance the purchase price of the book that he produces. All kinds of troubles result when Doc Holliday (Myron Healey) takes over the writing of the local biographies and according to premature reports, is most unflattering to the townspeople, including Mayor Kelley.
107	35	"Three"	May 13, 1958
108	36	"Dig a Grave for Ben Thompson"	May 20, 1958
109	37	"Four"	May 27, 1958
110	38	"The Frame-Up"	June 3, 1958
111	39	"My Husband"	June 10, 1958

=== Season 4 (1958–59) ===
No. overall	No. in season	Title	Original release date
112	1	"The Hole Up"	September 16, 1958
113	2	"The Peacemaker"	September 23, 1958
114	3	"The Bounty Killer"	September 30, 1958
115	4	"Caught by a Whisker"	October 7, 1958
116	5	"The Mysterious Cowhand"	October 14, 1958
117	6	"The Gatling Gun"	October 21, 1958
In this episode, Earp and his Indian guide, Mr. Cousin (Rico Alaniz), follow orders from General William Tecumseh Sherman to recover a Gatling gun captured by the Nez Perce. Richard Garland plays the part of the compassionate Chief Joseph, who laments the state of war between the Indians and a militia of land grabbers. Marshal Earp uses his conversation with Chief Joseph to decry the treatment of the Indians and to proclaim his Christian belief that all will obtain fair treatment in the hereafter if not in this life. The episode is set in Idaho, far from Dodge City.
118	7	"Cattle Thieves"	October 28, 1958
119	8	"Remittance Man"	November 4, 1958
120	9	"King of the Frontier"	November 11, 1958
Ned Buntline (Lloyd Corrigan) arrives in Dodge City after writing a book which proclaims Earp "King of the Frontier". Buntline claims that Earp can beat any cowboy in a variety of competitive activities, including shooting. Miles Breck (Grant Withers) of the Lazy Q outfit bets Buntline $10,000 that his men can beat Earp in selected challenges.
121	10	"Truth About Gunfighting"	November 18, 1958
122	11	"Frontier Woman"	November 25, 1958
123	12	"Santa Fe War"	December 2, 1958
124	13	"Plague Carrier"	December 9, 1958
125	14	"Kill the Editor"	December 16, 1958
126	15	"Little Brother"	December 23, 1958
127	16	"The Reformation of Doc Holliday"	December 30, 1958
128	17	"A Good Man"	January 6, 1959
Denver Pyle appeared as the "Reverend" Oliver Tittle, an unlikely crusader against gambling in this episode. In his crusade against the vice, Tittle come into conflict with saloon owner Ganly, and Earp must intervene to keep the peace between the two antagonists. In the first episode of 1960, Pyle returned to the series to play Dobie Jenner, who appears in Tombstone after a four-year imprisonment to find his former partner in crime, George McKean (Carleton G. Young), married to Phoebe (Rachel Ames), the woman Jenner loves.
129	18	"Death for a Stolen Horse"	January 13, 1959
130	19	"Last Stand at Smoky Hill"	January 20, 1959
131	20	"The Muleskinner"	January 27, 1959
132	21	"Earp Ain't Even Wearing Guns"	February 3, 1959
133	22	"Bat Jumps the Reservation"	February 10, 1959
134	23	"The Truth About Rawhide Geraghty"	February 17, 1959
In this episode, Earp agrees to ride shotgun for the retiring 69-year-old stagecoach driver Rawhide Geraghty, played by Eddy Waller, also of Casey Jones, who is making his last run for Wells Fargo from Tucumcari, New Mexico Territory, to Amarillo. The trip is hazardous with bandits and hostile Apache, and Rawhide fears he will not complete the run.
135	24	"She Almost Married Wyatt"	February 24, 1959
In numerous episodes, Earp is identified as a deacon in his church in Dodge City, including this one, with Ann Daniels as Cathy Prentice.
136	25	"Horse Race"	March 3, 1959
This episode, with Paul Picerni as Chief Bullhead, espouses the theme that the Indians must accept the white man's system of justice which seeks truth regardless based on the evidence in each case.
137	26	"Juveniles – 1878"	March 10, 1959
This episode attempts to address the occurrence of juvenile delinquency on the American frontier. Earp discovers that a 17-year-old runaway who arrives in Dodge City with ready cash and wanting to purchase a pistol may be from a well-to-do family; he manages to locate the youth's father, a judge back east.
138	27	"One Murder – Fifty Suspects"	March 17, 1959
139	28	"How to Be a Sheriff"	March 24, 1959
140	29	"The Judas Goat"	March 31, 1959
141	30	"Doc Fabrique's Greatest Case"	April 7, 1959
142	31	"The Actress"	April 14, 1959
143	32	"Love and Shotgun Gibbs"	April 21, 1959
144	33	"Dodge Is Civilized"	April 28, 1959
145	34	"Little Gray Home in the West"	May 5, 1959
146	35	"The Cyclone"	May 12, 1959
147	36	"Kelley Was Irish"	May 19, 1959
148	37	"Arizona Comes to Dodge"	May 26, 1959

=== Season 5 (1959–60) ===
No. overall	No. in season	Title	Original release date
149	1	"Dodge City: Hail and Farewell"	September 1, 1959
150	2	"The Trail to Tombstone"	September 8, 1959
151	3	"Tombstone"	September 15, 1959
152	4	"Wyatt's Decision"	September 22, 1959
153	5	"Lineup for Battle"	September 29, 1959
154	6	"The Nugget and the Epitaph"	October 6, 1959
155	7	"The Perfidy of Shotgun Gibbs"	October 13, 1959
156	8	"You Can't Fight City Hall"	October 20, 1959
157	9	"Behan Shows His Hand"	October 27, 1959
158	10	"The Ring of Death"	November 3, 1959
159	11	"Wyatt Wins One"	November 10, 1959
160	12	"The Fugitive"	November 17, 1959
161	13	"The Noble Outlaws"	November 24, 1959
James Coburn portrayed Buckskin Frank Leslie in this largely comedy episode. In the story line, Ned Buntline visits Tombstone to meet with the Clantons to gain information for a new book, but Earp asks Leslie to teach Buntline that outlaws are anything but "noble".
162	14	"The Paymaster"	December 1, 1959
163	15	"The Clantons' Family Row"	December 8, 1959
164	16	"The Matchmaker"	December 15, 1959
165	17	"Get Shotgun Gibbs"	December 22, 1959
166	18	"Wells Fargo Calling Marshal Earp"	December 29, 1959
167	19	"A Murderer's Return"	January 5, 1960
168	20	"The Big Fight at Total Wreck"	January 12, 1960
169	21	"Frontier Surgeon"	January 19, 1960
170	22	"Let's Hang Curly Bill"	January 26, 1960
171	23	"Silver Dollar"	February 2, 1960
In this episode, a young blonde saloon girl called Silver Dollar arrives in Tombstone to work at the Alhambra. While she can charm most men and take their money, Marshal Earp suspects serious questions exist about her past, and sends a wire to find out for sure. Silver Dollar is played by Dusty Anders, whose entire acting career was confined to five network appearances between 1959 and 1960.
172	24	"The Case of Senor Huerto"	February 9, 1960
173	25	"The Arizona Lottery"	February 16, 1960
174	26	"Don't Get Tough with a Sailor"	February 23, 1960
In this episode, Earp encounters Captain David Rowland (John Litel), a wealthy rancher and United States Navy veteran, who with a group of his former sailors, maintains his own law near the Mexican border, complete with his own jail. When Rowland incarcerates the duplicitous Sheriff Johnny Behan, Earp must intervene despite his admiration for the captain and Mrs. Rowland (Madge Kennedy).
175	27	"The Scout"	March 1, 1960
176	28	"The Buntline Special"	March 8, 1960
177	29	"China Mary"	March 15, 1960
178	30	"His Life in His Hands"	March 22, 1960
179	31	"Behan's Double Game"	March 29, 1960
180	32	"The Salvation of Emma Clanton"	April 5, 1960
181	33	"John Clum, Fighting Editor"	April 12, 1960
182	34	"The Judge"	April 19, 1960
183	35	"The Court vs. Doc Holliday"	April 26, 1960
184	36	"Roscoe Turns Detective"	May 3, 1960
185	37	"The Posse"	May 10, 1960
186	38	"The Confidence Man"	May 17, 1960
187	39	"The Toughest Judge in Arizona"	May 24, 1960
188	40	"My Enemy – John Behan"	May 31, 1960
189	41	"Wyatt's Bitterest Enemy"	June 7, 1960

=== Season 6 (1960–61) ===
No. overall	No. in season	Title	Original release date
190	1	"The Truth About Old Man Clanton"	September 27, 1960
191	2	"The Doctor"	October 4, 1960
192	3	"Johnny Behind the Deuce"	October 11, 1960
193	4	"Shoot to Kill"	October 18, 1960
194	5	"Study of a Crooked Sheriff"	October 25, 1960
195	6	"Big Brother"	November 1, 1960
196	7	"Woman of Tucson"	November 15, 1960
197	8	"The Fanatic"	November 22, 1960
198	9	"He's My Brother"	November 29, 1960
199	10	"The Too Perfect Crime"	December 6, 1960
200	11	"Johnny Ringo's Girl"	December 13, 1960
201	12	"Miss Sadie"	December 20, 1960
202	13	"Winning Streak"	December 27, 1960
203	14	"Billy Buckett, Incorporated"	January 3, 1961
204	15	"Horse Thief"	January 10, 1961
205	16	"Terror in the Desert"	January 24, 1961
206	17	"Old Slanders"	January 31, 1961
207	18	"Loyalty"	February 7, 1961
208	19	"Johnny Behan Falls in Love"	February 14, 1961
209	20	"Casey and the Clowns"	February 21, 1961
In this episode, Earp devises a unique plan to locate $50,000 stolen from the Bank of Tombstone by the Harlequins gang, whose members wear clown masks and outfits to disguise their identity. Earp convinces the president of the Arizona Bank to transfer emergency funds to the Bank of Tombstone to prevent a bank run, as customers demand their cash. Earp goes undercover and dons a clown outfit to infiltrate the gang to find where the money has been stashed. L. Q. Jones makes his only appearance on the series in the role of Tex, the leader of the Harlequins. Willard Sage portrays Bill Casey, one of the gang members, who is captured and awaits release by the gang.
210	21	"Doc Holliday Faces Death"	February 28, 1961
211	22	"Apache Gold"	March 7, 1961
212	23	"The Good Mule and the Bad Mule"	March 14, 1961
213	24	"Clanton and Cupid"	March 21, 1961
214	25	"Wyatt Takes the Primrose Path"	March 28, 1961
215	26	"The Convict's Revenge"	April 4, 1961
216	27	"Until Proven Guilty"	April 11, 1961
217	28	"The Shooting Starts"	April 18, 1961
218	29	"Wyatt Earp's Baby"	April 25, 1961
219	30	"The Law Must Be Fair"	May 2, 1961
220	31	"A Papa for Butch and Ginger"	May 9, 1961
221	32	"Hiding Behind a Star"	May 23, 1961
222	33	"Requiem for Old Man Clanton"	May 30, 1961
223	34	"Wyatt's Brothers Join Up"	June 6, 1961
224	35	"Just Before the Battle"	June 13, 1961
225	36	"Gunfight at the O.K. Corral"	June 20, 1961
226	37	"The Outlaws Cry Murder"	June 27, 1961
