= Alan Dinehart =

American actor (1889–1944)

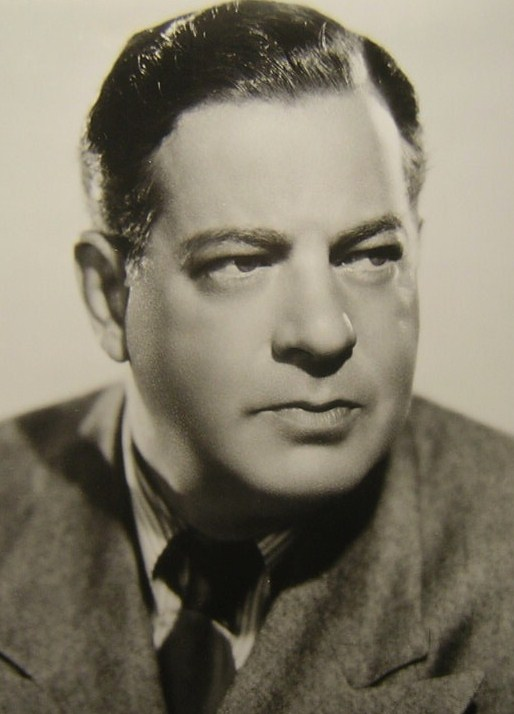
- Alan Dinehart in Big Town Girl (1937)
- Born: Harold Alan Dinehart; October 3, 1889; St. Paul, Minnesota, U.S.
- Died: July 18, 1944 (aged 54); Hollywood, California, U.S.
- Resting place: Forest Lawn Memorial Park, Glendale
- Other names: Allan Dinehart; Mason Alan Dinehart
- Occupation: Actor
- Years active: 1931–1944
- Spouse(s): Louise Dyer Dinehart (m. 1912; div. 1932) Mozelle Britton (m. 1933)
- Children: 3, including Mason Alan Dinehart

Mason Alan Dinehart Sr. (born Harold Alan Dinehart; October 3, 1889 – July 18, 1944) was an American actor, director, writer, and stage manager.

== Biography ==
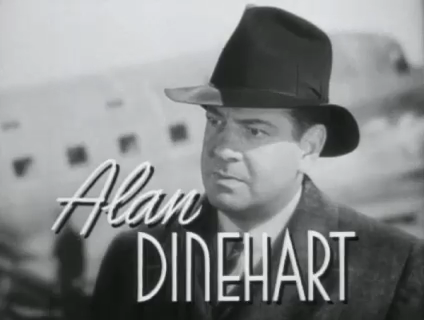
Dinehart in The First Hundred Years (1938)

Dinehart was born in St. Paul, Minnesota. He initially studied to be a priest, but he turned to the theater instead. His first acting experience came at Missoula University in Montana. He left school to pursue a career on stage. He was active in Vaudeville before moving into other areas of entertainment.

Dinehart debuted on stage at the Bush Temple of Music in Chicago, and a year later he worked at the Palace Theatre in New York. His first full-length play performance came in The Gypsy Trail in 1918.

He had no screen experience when he signed a contract with Fox in May 1931. He became a character actor and supporting player in at least eighty-eight films between 1931 and 1944. Earlier, he appeared in more than twenty Broadway plays.

Dinehart co-wrote and starred in the Broadway play Separate Rooms, which opened on March 23, 1940 at the Maxine Elliott Theatre and ran for 613 performances.

Dinehart's likeness was drawn in caricature by Alex Gard for Sardi's, the New York City theater district restaurant. The picture is now part of the collection of the New York Public Library.

Dinehart's second son, Mason Alan Dinehart, was cast in several 1950s television series, including the role of a young Bat Masterson in the ABC/Desilu Studios western, The Life and Legend of Wyatt Earp, starring Hugh O'Brian in the title role.

== Personal life ==
In 1936, Dinehart had his name legally changed to Mason Alan Dinehart. He had been baptized Harold Alan Dinehart, but his wife explained that the change would permit their son to be legally named Alan Dinehart III.

Dinehart was married to actress Louise Dyer until they were divorced in 1932. He married actress Mozelle Britton in 1933. He had two sons, one of whom is Mason Alan Dinehart.

== Death ==
Dinehart died of heart disease on July 18, 1944. He was 54 years old. (Another source says that he died in Hollywood Presbyterian Hospital on July 17, 1944, aged 48. His body was cremated at Forest Lawn Memorial Park in Glendale, California, on July 20, 1944, with no service. A committal service was held in Glendale on August 18, 1944, and his ashes were placed in Forest Lawn Memorial Park's Columbarium of Memory.

== Selected filmography ==
- The Brat (1931) - MacMillan Forrester
- Wicked (1931) - Blake
- Girls About Town (1931) - Jerry Chase
- Good Sport (1931) - Rex Parker
- Disorderly Conduct (1932) - Fletcher
- Devil's Lottery (1932) - American (uncredited)
- The Trial of Vivienne Ware (1932) - Prosecutor
- Street of Women (1932) - Lawrence 'Larry' Baldwin
- Bachelor's Affairs (1932) - Luke Radcliff
- Almost Married (1932) - Inspector Slante
- Okay, America! (1932) - Roger Jones
- Washington Merry-Go-Round (1932) - Norton
- Rackety Rax (1932) - Counsellor Sultsfeldt
- The Devil Is Driving (1932) - Jenkins
- Lawyer Man (1932) - Granville Bentley
- As the Devil Commands (1932) - Robert Waldo
- Sweepings (1933) - Thane Pardway
- Supernatural (1933) - Paul Bavian
- A Study in Scarlet (1933) - Merrydew
- I Have Lived (1933) - Thomas Langley
- Her Bodyguard (1933) - Lester Cunningham
- No Marriage Ties (1933) - 'Perk' Perkins
- The Road Is Open Again (1933, short subject, as George Washington) - George Washington
- Dance Girl Dance (1933) - Wade 'Val' Valentine
- As the Devil Commands (1933) - Robert Waldo
- Bureau of Missing Persons (1933) - Therme Roberts
- Fury of the Jungle (1933) - Taggart
- The World Changes (1933) - Ogden Jarrett
- The Sin of Nora Moran (1933) - District Attorney John Grant
- Cross Country Cruise (1934) - Steve Borden
- The Crosby Case (1934) - Police Inspector Thomas
- Jimmy the Gent (1934) - Charles Wallingham
- A Very Honorable Guy (1934) - The Brain
- The Love Captive (1934) - Roger Loft
- Baby Take a Bow (1934) - Welch
- The Cat's-Paw (1934) - Mayor Ed Morgan
- Lottery Lover (1935) - Edward Arthur 'Tank' Tankersley
- $10 Raise (1935) - Fuller
- Dante's Inferno (1935) - Jonesy
- Redheads on Parade (1935) - George Magnus
- The Payoff (1935) - Marty
- Thanks a Million (1935) - Mr. Kruger
- In Old Kentucky (1935) - Slick Doherty
- Your Uncle Dudley (1935) - Charlie Post
- It Had to Happen (1936) - Rodman Dreke
- Everybody's Old Man (1936) - Frederick Gillespie
- The Country Beyond (1936) - Ray Jennings
- Human Cargo (1936) - Lionel Crocker
- Parole! (1936) - Richard Mallard
- The Crime of Dr. Forbes (1936) - Prosecuting Attorney
- Charlie Chan at the Race Track (1936) - George Chester
- Star for a Night (1936) - James Dunning
- King of the Royal Mounted (1936) - Frank Becker
- Reunion (1936) - Philip Crandell
- Born to Dance (1936) - McKay
- Woman-Wise (1937) - Richards
- Step Lively, Jeeves! (1937) - Hon. Cedric B. Cromwell
- Midnight Taxi (1937) - Philip Strickland
- This Is My Affair (1937) - Doc Keller
- Fifty Roads to Town (1937) - Jerome Kendall
- Dangerously Yours (1937) - Julien Stevens
- Danger – Love at Work (1937) - Allan Duncan
- Ali Baba Goes to Town (1937) - Boland
- Big Town Girl (1937) - Larry Edwards
- Love on a Budget (1938) - Charles M. Dixon / Uncle Charlie
- The First Hundred Years (1938) - Samuel Z. Walker
- Rebecca of Sunnybrook Farm (1938) - Purvis
- Up the River (1938) - Warden Clarence Willis
- Fast and Loose (1939) - Dave Hilliard
- King of the Turf (1939) - Nick Grimes
- Second Fiddle (1939) - George 'Whit' Whitney
- The House of Fear (1939) - Joseph Morton
- Hotel for Women (1939) - Stephen Gates
- Two Bright Boys (1939) - Bill Hallet
- Everything Happens at Night (1939) - Fred Sherwood
- Slightly Honorable (1939) - Commissioner Joyce
- Girl Trouble (1942) - Charles Barrett
- It's a Great Life (1943) - Collender Martin
- Fired Wife (1943) - Jerry Donohue
- Sweet Rosie O'Grady (1943) - Arthur Skinner
- The Heat's On (1943) - Forrest Stanton
- What a Woman! (1943) - Pat O'Shea
- The Whistler (1943) - Gorman
- Moon Over Las Vegas (1944) - Hal Blake
- Seven Days Ashore (1944) - Daniel Arland
- Johnny Doesn't Live Here Any More (1944) - Judge
- Minstrel Man (1944) - Lew Dunn
- Oh, What a Night (1944) - Detective Norris
- A Wave, a WAC and a Marine (1944) - R. J., the Producer (final film role)
