= State Trooper (TV series) =

American crime drama

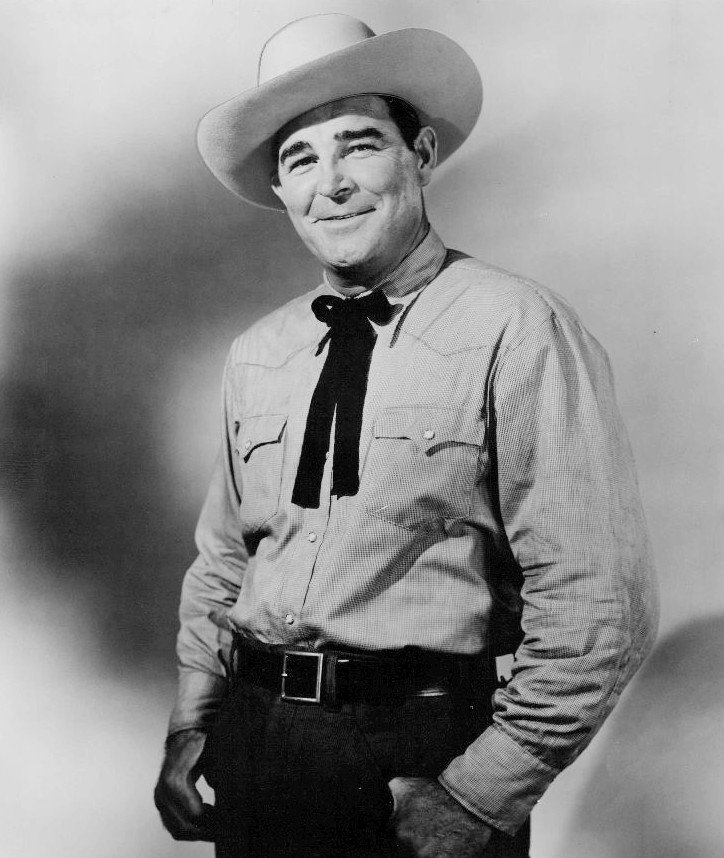
- Rod Cameron as Rod Blake, 1957
- Genre: Western/Crime drama
- Written by: Fenton Earnshaw; Lawrence Kimble; Leslie McFarlane; Barry Shipman; Steven Thornley
- Starring: Rod Cameron; Robert Armstrong
- Country of origin: United States
- Original language: English
- No. of seasons: 3
- No. of episodes: 104 (list of episodes)

Production
- Producer: Richard Irving
- Camera setup: Single-camera
- Running time: 30 minutes
- Production company: Revue Studios

Original release
- Network: Syndication
- Release: September 25, 1956 – June 25, 1959

Related
- Star Stage

State Trooper is an American crime drama set in the American West of the 1950s, starring Rod Cameron as Lt. Rod Blake, an officer and chief investigator of the Nevada Department of Public Safety. The series aired 104 episodes in syndication from 1956 to 1959.

== Overview ==
State Trooper takes place in Las Vegas, Reno, and Carson City, Nevada, but was filmed by Revue Studios at Iverson Movie Ranch in Chatsworth in Los Angeles County in California. Its fictional stories focus upon miners, ranchers, dude ranches, released convicts, and murder mysteries, often with surprise endings.

The series pilot was titled "Killer on a Horseback". Starring Rod Cameron, it aired in February 1956 as an episode of the NBC anthology series Star Stage.

Blake carried a "Detective Special" revolver.

== Cast ==
The series starred Rod Cameron as Lieutenant Rod Blake. Robert Armstrong appeared in 24 episodes as Sheriff Andy Anderson, who developed a good working relationship with Cameron's character, Blake. Don Haggerty played Sheriff Elder in nine episodes in the 1956–1957 season. Paul Stader appeared five times in the 1958–1959 season as Deputy Sheriff Jim Wallace. Tom Greenway appeared in four episodes as Sheriff Bronson: "Stay Lost, Little Girl", "Dangerous Honeymoon", "Full Circle", and "Death on Wheels".

=== Guest stars ===
- Chris Alcaide
- Fred Aldrich
- Claude Akins
- Jack Albertson
- Merry Anders
- Robert Anderson
- Raymond Bailey
- Barbara Bain
- Baynes Barron
- Herschel Bernardi
- Amanda Blake
- Whitney Blake
- Robert Burton
- Jean Byron
- King Calder
- Bill Cassady
- James Chandler
- James Coburn
- Miriam Colon
- Mike Connors
- Russ Conway
- Dabbs Greer
- Karl Davis
- Frank De Vol
- Angie Dickinson
- Mason Alan Dinehart
- Richard Farnsworth
- Frank Ferguson
- Frances Fong
- Constance Ford
- Beverly Garland
- Carol Henry
- Ed Hinton
- Jean Inness
- Vivi Janiss
- Carolyn Jones
- DeForest Kelley
- Jack Kelly
- Wright King
- Fred Krone
- Michael Landon
- Rusty Lane
- Norman Leavitt
- Maureen Leeds
- Karl Lukas
- Ted Mapes
- Joyce Meadows
- Read Morgan
- Burt Mustin
- James Nolan
- Jeanette Nolan
- Gregg Palmer
- Robert Patten
- Joe Ploski
- Denver Pyle
- Mike Ragan
- Gilman Rankin
- Stephen Roberts
- Penny Santon
- Cosmo Sardo
- Gloria Saunders
- Vito Scotti
- Fred Sherman
- Robert F. Simon
- Olan Soule
- Kim Spaulding
- Craig Stevens
- Boyd Stockman
- Hope Summers
- William Swan
- Nita Talbot
- Guy Teague
- Robert Tetrick
- Constance Towers
- Lee Van Cleef
- Robert Vaughn
- John Vivyan
- Wilson Wood

== Episodes ==
Season	Episodes	Originally released	
Season	Episodes	First released	Last released
1	40	September 25, 1956	October 6, 1957
2	31	December 1, 1957	September 10, 1958
3	24	January 1, 1959	August 6, 1959

== Production ==
Originally conceived to compete with Highway Patrol, the show pilot was an episode of the anthology series Star Stage, airing on February 3, 1956 and titled "Killer on Horseback".

State Trooper was filmed on location in Virginia City, Nevada to give it an authentic feel. Las Vegas was also used for location filming.

== Release ==
=== Broadcast ===
After the pilot release on Star Stage, the series failed to make the network schedule for 1956 and State Trooper was released as a syndicated show being sold directly to local stations.

=== Home media ===
Timeless Media Group released the complete first season on DVD in Region 1 on December 14, 2010. The complete second and third seasons were released together in a six-disc set on December 13, 2011.

On September 23, 2014, Timeless Media Group released State Trooper - The Complete Series on DVD in Region 1. The 11-disc set contains all 104 episodes of the series.
