= Bill Cassady =

American film and television actor

- Born: William Cassady Sizemore; September 5, 1923
- Died: September 15, 2006 (aged 83); Prescott, Arizona, U.S.
- Occupation(s): Film and television actor
- Years active: 1949–1966

William Cassady Sizemore (September 5, 1923 – September 15, 2006) was an American film and television actor. He was known for playing Dr. McCarty in the third and fourth season of the American western television series The Life and Legend of Wyatt Earp.

Cassady appeared in the films Up Front (1951), starring David Wayne and Tom Ewell; Meet Danny Wilson (1952), starring Frank Sinatra, Shelley Winters and Alex Nicol; Footsteps in the Night (1957), starring Wild Bill Elliott; Man's Favorite Sport? (1964), starring Rock Hudson and Paula Prentiss and Not with My Wife, You Don't! (1966), starring Tony Curtis, Virna Lisi and George C. Scott. He guest-starred in television programs including Sergeant Preston of the Yukon, State Trooper, Death Valley Days, Johnny Midnight, Highway Patrol, The Wild Wild West and Harbor Command.

== Partial filmography ==
- The Pecos Pistol (1949)
- Peggy (1950)
- Up Front (1951)
- Meet Danny Wilson (1952)
- Francis Goes to West Point (1952)
- Back at the Front (1952)
- Because of You (1952)
- Hold Back the Night (1956)
- Calling Homicide (1956)
- Last of the Badmen (1957)
- Footsteps in the Night (1957)
- Spook Chasers (1957)
- The Amazing Colossal Man (1957)
- Cole Younger, Gunfighter (1958)
- The Man in the Net (1959)
- Man's Favorite Sport? (1964)
- Not with My Wife, You Don't! (1966)
