= Probe (film) =

1972 television film by Leslie Stevens

- Genre: Crime; Sci-Fi; Thriller
- Written by: Leslie Stevens
- Directed by: Russ Mayberry
- Starring: Hugh O'Brian; Elke Sommer; Burgess Meredith; Lilia Skala
- Music by: Dominic Frontiere
- Country of origin: United States
- Original language: English

Production
- Producer: Leslie Stevens
- Cinematography: John M. Stephens
- Editor: Bill Brame
- Running time: 95 minutes
- Production companies: Leslie Stevens Productions; Warner Bros. Television

Original release
- Network: NBC
- Release: February 21, 1972

Probe is a 1972 American made-for-television crime sci-fi thriller film produced as a pilot for a science fiction detective series, originally to have continued under that title. Created by Leslie Stevens, it starred Hugh O'Brian as Hugh Lockwood, one of a group of high-tech private eyes working for the organization "World Securities Corp." When picked up for series production, the title was changed to Search, because Probe was the name of an existing PBS series. The film originally aired February 21, 1972 on NBC.

The investigators, called Probes, were outfitted with various electronic implants including a button-sized "scanner" containing a miniaturized video camera, microphone and transmitter linked to a team of technicians and experts who constantly monitored the Probe's surroundings, actions and vital signs; they were able to supply the Probe with encyclopedic information on any subject.

Lockwood was designated "Probe One." In the pilot, he sets out for Europe to track down a multimillion-pound stash of gemstones amassed by Hermann Goering during World War II.

The pilot has been released as a publish-on-demand DVD-R on August 1, 2011.

== Cast ==
- Hugh O'Brian as Hugh Lockwood
- Elke Sommer as Heideline "Uli" Ullman
- Burgess Meredith as V.C.R. Cameron
- Lilia Skala as Frieda Ullman
- Angel Tompkins as Gloria Harding
- John Gielgud as Harold L. Streeter
- Kent Smith as Dr. Edward Laurent
- Alfred Ryder as Cheyne
- Ben Wright as Kurt van Niestat
- Robert Boon as Felix Ernst
- Albert Popwell as Dr. Griffin
- A Martinez as Carlos Lobos
- Byron Chung as Kuroda
- Ginny Golden as Ginny Keach
- Jules Maitland as Reinhardt Brugge

== Probe Control ==
Probe agents reported to V.C.R. Cameron (Burgess Meredith), the "director" of the investigations, who ran Probe Control Unit One, a center patterned on the NASA Mission Control Center. "Cam" was the leader of the expert team who monitored and provided the agent with intelligence. Early in the series the Probe Control set was placed in a darkened isolated space, alluding to a large-scale operations center. By the middle of the season, the control room was scaled down and relocated to a well-lit but smaller "bunker rush" room. According to the show's credits, the computer equipment was provided by Control Data Corporation.

The building used as the headquarters for World Securities Corporation is currently the headquarters for Bank of America in San Francisco.

World Security Headquarters - Probe Control
