= List of State Trooper episodes =

State Trooper is an American crime drama set in the American West of the 1950s, starring Rod Cameron as Lt. Rod Blake, an officer/chief investigator of the Nevada Department of Public Safety. The series aired 104 episodes in syndication from 1956 to 1959.

== Series overview ==
Season	Episodes	Originally released	
Season	Episodes	First released	Last released
1	40	September 25, 1956	October 6, 1957
2	31	December 1, 1957	September 10, 1958
3	24	January 1, 1959	August 6, 1959

== Episodes ==
=== Season 1 (1956–57) ===
No. overall	No. in season	Title	Directed by	Written by	Original release date
1	1	"Red Badge of Death"	Richard Irving	Lawrence Kimble	September 25, 1956
2	2	"The Paperhanger of Pioche"	Richard Irving	Lawrence Kimble	October 2, 1956
3	3	"Meeting at Julia's"	Richard Irving	Lawrence Kimble	October 9, 1956
4	4	"Jailbreak at Tonopah"	Richard Irving	Lawrence Kimble	November 28, 1956
5	5	"The Hills of Homicide"	Richard Irving	Lawrence Kimble	December 4, 1956
6	6	"From Here to Molokai"	Richard Irving	Lawrence Kimble	December 7, 1956
7	7	"What Price Gloria"	Richard Irving	Lawrence Kimble	December 11, 1956
8	8	"Weep No More O'Grady"	Earl Bellamy	Lawrence Kimble	December 12, 1956
9	9	"Nevada Boy, Pride and Joy"	Don McDougall	Lawrence Kimble	December 18, 1956
10	10	"One Way to Tahoe"	Richard Irving	Lawrence Kimble	December 25, 1956
11	11	"Room Service for 321"	Richard Irving	Lawrence Kimble	January 1, 1957
12	12	"The Cash Out"	Don McDougall	Story by : Thomas Walsh; Teleplay by : Fenton Earnshaw	January 15, 1957
13	13	"Trail of the Dead"	Don McDougall	Story by : Leslie MacFarlane; Teleplay by : Barry Shipman	January 29, 1957
14	14	"Rocking Chair Bandit"	Richard Irving	Lawrence Kimble	February 1, 1957
15	15	"Coate of Many Colors"	Sidney Salkow	Lawrence Kimble	February 13, 1957
16	16	"Boulder Joe's Bottle House"	Don McDougall	Lawrence Kimble	February 20, 1957
17	17	"Who Killed Doc Robbins"	Don McDougall	Lawrence Kimble	February 27, 1957
18	18	"Buck Fever"	Herschel Daugherty	Lawrence Kimble	March 1, 1957
19	19	"No Fancy Cowboys"	Don McDougall	James Gunn	March 13, 1957
20	20	"The Widow Makers"	Boris Segal	Lawrence Kimble	March 22, 1957
21	21	"Violets on Mt. Rose"	Don McDougall	Lawrence Kimble	March 27, 1957
22	22	"The Last Stage Robbery"	Richard Irving	Lawrence Kimble	April 2, 1957
23	23	"The Silver Duke"	Don McDougall	Story by : Leslie MacFarlane; Teleplay by : Barry Shipman	April 10, 1957
24	24	"Death on the Rock"	Sidney Salkow	Story by : Leo Gordon; Teleplay by : Leo Gordon & Fenton Earnshaw	April 17, 1957
25	25	"Diamonds Come High"	Richard Irving	Lawrence Kimble	May 1, 1957
26	26	"The Last War Party"	Richard Irving	Lawrence Kimble	May 8, 1957
27	27	"Voice of the Bug"	Richard Irving	Lawrence Kimble	May 14, 1957
28	28	"Cinder Jungle"	Richard Irving	Fenton Earnshaw	May 15, 1957
29	29	"The One That Didn't Get Away"	Richard Irving	Fenton Earnshaw	May 17, 1957
30	30	"Jail Trail"	Richard Irving	Fenton Earnshaw	May 29, 1957
31	31	"The Only Girl on Boot Hill"	Richard Irving	Lawrence Kimble	1957
32	32	"No Blaze of Glory"	D. Ross Lederman	Lawrence Kimble	June 12, 1957
33	33	"Beef ala Murder"	D. Ross Lederman	Lawrence Kimble	June 19, 1957
34	34	"Ride Til You Die"	Richard Irving	Fenton Earnshaw	June 26, 1957
35	35	"The Live Shell Game"	D. Ross Lederman	Fenton Earnshaw	August 23, 1957
36	36	"Out of Line"	D. Ross Lederman	Fenton Earnshaw	September 15, 1957
37	37	"A Penny Saved"	Stan Shpetner	Lawrence Kimble	September 19, 1957
38	38	"Madman on the Mountain"	Richard Irving	Lawrence Kimble	September 22, 1957
39	39	"Safe on a Boat"	Richard Irving	Lawrence Kimble	September 29, 1957
40	40	"Fury on Fremont Street"	D. Ross Lederman	Lawrence Kimble	October 6, 1957

=== Season 2 (1957–58) ===
No. overall	No. in season	Title	Directed by	Written by	Original release date
41	1	"The Talking Corpse"	Richard Irving	Lawrence Kimble	December 1, 1957
42	2	"The Gandy Dancers of Steptoe Valley"	Richard Irving	Lawrence Kimble	December 15, 1957
43	3	"The Sound of Death"	John English	Barry Shipman	December 22, 1957
44	4	"The Dancing Dowager"	John English	Fenton Earnshaw	December 29, 1957
45	5	"Diamonds in the Rough"	John English	Fenton Earnshaw	January 3, 1958
46	6	"Cable Car to Tombstone"	Tom Gries	Lawrence Kimble	January 12, 1958
47	7	"The Perilous Picnic"	John English	Barry Shipman	January 19, 1958
48	8	"Grudge Race"	Tom Gries	Fenton Earnshaw	January 26, 1958
49	9	"The Doll Who Couldn't Sleep"	Stan Shpetner	Lawrence Kimble	February 9, 1958
50	10	"Death on Wheels"	Stan Shpetner	Fenton Earnshaw	February 16, 1958
51	11	"Full Circle"	Tom Gries	Story by : John Draft; Teleplay by : John Draft & Fenton Earnshaw	February 16, 1958
52	12	"Dangerous Honeymoon"	John English	Barry Shipman	February 23, 1958
53	13	"The Case of the Happy Dragon"	Richard Irving	Lawrence Kimble	March 1, 1958
54	14	"Sweetheart of Sigmund Kaye"	Stan Shpetner	Lawrence Kimble	March 8, 1958
55	15	"Wild Green Yonder"	John English	Fenton Earnshaw	March 15, 1958
56	16	"The Widow Makers"	Boris Sagal	Lawrence Kimble	March 22, 1958
57	17	"Mystery Sniper"	John English	Barry Shipman	March 29, 1958
58	18	"710 Hysteria Street"	Boris Sagal	Lawrence Kimble	April 6, 1958
59	19	"Crisis at Comstock"	John English	Barry Shipman	April 13, 1958
60	20	"Kitchen Kill"	John English	Story by : Jonathan Craig; Teleplay by : Lawrence Kimble	April 20, 1958
61	21	"Stay Lost Little Girl"	John English	Barry Shipman	April 27, 1958
62	22	"Firebug"	John English	Barry Shipman	May 4, 1958
63	23	"312 Vertical"	Richard Irving	Fenton Earnshaw	May 11, 1958
64	24	"The Last Waltz"	Boris Sagal	Lawrence Kimble	May 18, 1958
65	25	"No, My Darling Daughter"	John English	Barry Shipman	June 1, 1958
66	26	"Key to a Killer"	Lawrence Dobkin	Fenton Earnshaw	June 22, 1958
67	27	"Joker's Dead"	Lawrence Dobkin	Barry Shipman	July 14, 1958
68	28	"The Winnemucca Weskit"	John English	Lawrence Kimble	July 21, 1958
69	29	"You Can't Run Forever"	Boris Sagal	Fenton Earnshaw	July 28, 1958
70	30	"Sweet & Gentle, Ltd."	John English	Lawrence Kimble	August 18, 1958
71	31	"Hardrock Man"	Richard Irving	Lawrence Kimble	September 10, 1958

=== Season 3: 1959 ===
No. overall	No. in season	Title	Directed by	Written by	Original release date
72	1	"Prettiest Dress in Goldfield"	Richard Irving	Lawrence Kimble	January 1, 1959
73	2	"What's Mine is Mine"	Richard Irving	Lawrence Kimble	January 8, 1959
74	3	"Larceny and Old Ace"	John English	Lawrence Kimble	January 15, 1959
75	4	"Lonely Valley"	Ray Nazarro	Barry Shipman	January 29, 1959
76	5	"Fiddle Dee Dead"	Ray Nazarro	Ken Pattus	February 19, 1959
77	6	"Inherit a Bullet"	Boris Sagal	Lawrence Kimble	March 3, 1959
78	7	"The Man from Solitary"	Earl Bellamy	Lawrence Kimble	March 10, 1959
79	8	"Hard Money, Soft Touch"	Earl Bellamy	Lawrence Kimble	March 17, 1959
80	9	"Carson City Kitty"	Richard Irving	Barry Shipman	March 24, 1959
81	10	"The Judas Tree"	William Witney	Barry Shipman	April 2, 1959
82	11	"The Choker"	Signey Salkow	Barry Shipman	April 9, 1959
83	12	"The Case of the Barefoot Girl"	Richard Irving	Lawrence Kimble	April 16, 1959
84	13	"Let 'Em Eat Smoke"	William Witney	Lawrence Kimble	April 23, 1959
85	14	"The Patient Skeleton"	William Witney	Lawrence Kimble	April 30, 1959
86	15	"Pistols for Two"	William Witney	Lawrence Kimble	May 7, 1959
87	16	"While Jerome Burned"	William Witney	Ken Pettus	May 14, 1959
88	17	"The Night Has a Thousand Eyes"	William Witney	Barry Shipman	May 18, 1959
89	18	"So Early in the Mourning"	William Witney	Lawrence Kimble	May 21, 1959
90	19	"Love on the Rocks"	William Witney	Stephen Kandel	May 28, 1959
91	20	"And Baby Makes Two"	Richard Irving	Lawrence Kimble	June 4, 1959
92	21	"Everything Else is Bridgeport"	Harve Foster	Steven Thornley	June 11, 1959
93	22	"The Girl on Cloud Nine"	Richard Irving	Lawrence Kimble	June 25, 1959
94	23	"Another Chance"	John English	Fenton Earnshaw & Scott Littleton	July 2, 1959
95	24	"The Woman Who Cried Wolf"	John English	Barry Shipman	August 6, 1959
