= The Fighting Ranger (1934 film) =

1934 film

- Film poster
- Directed by: George B. Seitz
- Written by: Harry O. Hoyt
- Produced by: Irving Briskin
- Starring: Buck Jones
- Cinematography: Sidney Wagner
- Edited by: Gene Milford
- Distributed by: Columbia Pictures
- Release date: March 17, 1934
- Running time: 60 minutes
- Country: United States
- Language: English

The Fighting Ranger is a 1934 American pre-Code Western film directed by George B. Seitz.

== Cast ==
- Buck Jones as Jim Houston (as Charles 'Buck' Jones)
- Dorothy Revier as Tonita, Cantina Singer
- Frank Rice as Thunder, Texas Ranger
- Bradley Page as Cougar the Half Breed
- Ward Bond as Dave, Cougar Henchman
- Frank LaRue as Ranger Captain Wilkes (as Frank La Rue)
- Paddy O'Flynn as Bob Houston
- Mozelle Britton as Waitress in Eureka (as Mozelle Brittonne)
