= The Life and Legend of Wyatt Earp =

American Western television series (1955–1961)

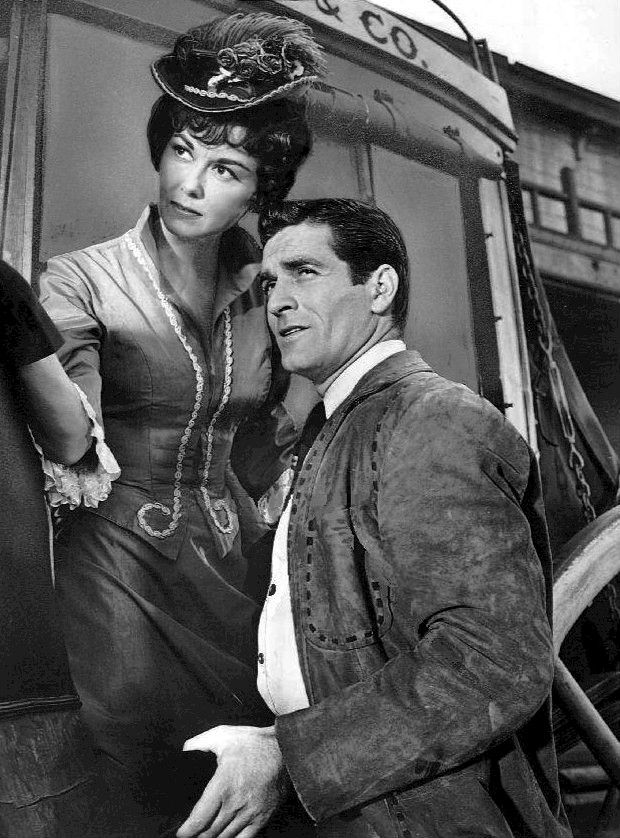
- Hugh O'Brian as Wyatt Earp and Adele Mara (1961)
- Genre: Western
- Written by: Frederick Hazlitt Brennan; John Dunkel; Daniel B. Ullman
- Directed by: Paul Landres; Frank McDonald; Roy Rowland; Sidney Salkow
- Starring: Hugh O'Brian; Mason Alan Dinehart; Douglas Fowley; Myron Healey; Ray Kellogg; William Tannen; Damian O'Flynn; Ray Boyle; John Anderson; Ross Elliott; Morgan Woodward; Bill Cassady; Fred Coby
- Composers: Herman Stein; Ken Darby
- Country of origin: United States
- Original language: English
- No. of seasons: 6
- No. of episodes: 226 (list of episodes)

Production
- Executive producers: Louis F. Edelman; Robert Sisk
- Producer: Roy Rowland
- Cinematography: Harold E. Wellman; Howard Schwartz; Henry Cronjager Jr.; Robert B. Hauser
- Editor: John Durant
- Running time: 30 minutes
- Production companies: Wyatt Earp Enterprises; Desilu Productions

Original release
- Network: ABC
- Release: September 6, 1955 – June 27, 1961

The Life and Legend of Wyatt Earp is an American Western television series that premiered on ABC on September 6, 1955 and concluded on June 27, 1961. The series is loosely based on the life of frontier marshal Wyatt Earp, with Hugh O'Brian in the title role.

It was the first Western television series written for adults.

== Plot ==
The first season of the series purports to tell the story of Wyatt's experiences as deputy town marshal of Ellsworth, Kansas (first four episodes), and then as town marshal in Wichita. In the second episode of the second season, first aired September 4, 1956, he is hired as assistant city marshal of Dodge City, where the setting remained for three seasons. The final episode set in Dodge City (Season 5, Episode 1 - "Dodge City: Hail and Farewell") aired on September 1, 1959. Beginning the next week on September 8, 1959 (Season 5, Episode 2 - "The Trail to Tombstone"), the locale shifted to Tombstone, Arizona Territory, for the remainder of the series.

== Cast ==
=== Main cast ===
- Hugh O'Brian as Wyatt Earp (229 episodes)
- Mason Alan Dinehart as Bat Masterson (34 episodes)
- Douglas Fowley/Myron Healey as John H. "Doc" Holliday (49 episodes/10 episodes)
- Ray Kellogg as Deputy Ollie (13 episodes)
- William Tannen as Deputy Hal Norton (56 episodes)
- Damian O'Flynn as Judge Tobin/Dr. Goodfellow (68 episodes)
- Ray Boyle as Morgan Earp (15 episodes)
- John Anderson/Ross Elliott as Virgil Earp (5 episodes/4 episodes)
- Morgan Woodward as "Shotgun" Gibbs (81 episodes)
- Bill Cassady as Dr. McCarty (11 episodes)
- Fred Coby as Pony Deal (5 episodes)

=== Recurring cast ===
- Paul Brinegar/Ralph Sanford as James H. "Dog" Kelley (34 episodes/21 episodes)
- James Seay as Judge Wells Spicer (25 episodes)
- Brick Sullivan as Deputy Brick (23 episodes)
- Don Haggerty as Marsh Murdock (21 episodes)
- Rico Alaniz as Mr. Cousin (19 episodes)
- Rodd Redwing as Mr. Brother (8 episodes)
- Trevor Bardette as Newman Haynes Clanton (21 episodes)
- John Milford/Rayford Barnes as Ike Clanton (8 episodes)
- Carol Thurston as Emma Clanton (7 episodes)
- William Phipps as Curly Bill Brocius (16 episodes)
- Randy Stuart as Nellie Cashman (12 episodes)
- Carol Montgomery Stone/Collette Lyons as Big Nose Kate (10 episodes/4 episodes)
- Steve Brodie/Lash La Rue as Sheriff Johnny Behan (9 episodes/8 episodes)
- Gregg Palmer as Tom McLowery (4 episodes)
- Margaret Hayes as Dora Hand (3 episodes)
- Denver Pyle/Walter Coy as Ben Thompson (8 episodes/1 episode)
- Bob Steele as Deputy Sam (4 episodes)
- Donald Murphy/Norman Alden as Johnny Ringo/Johnny Ringgold (6 episodes)
- William Mims as Dameron (6 episodes)
- Walter Maslow as Dick Averill/Blackie Saunders (5 episodes)
- Kem Dibbs as Deputy Mike Teague (3 episodes)
- Wayne Mallory as Deputy Louie (3 episodes)
- Barney Phillips as Lou Rickabaugh (3 episodes)
- Norman Leavitt as Mr. Phillips (2 episodes)

=== Townsman actors ===
- Jimmy Noel as Townsman (144 episodes)
- Ethan Laidlaw as Townsman (138 episodes)
- Bill Coontz as Townsman (99 episodes)
- Chet Brandenburg as Townsman (79 episodes)
- Buddy Roosevelt as Townsman (65 episodes)
- Kermit Maynard as Townsman (48 episodes)
- Jack Tornek as Townsman (47 episodes)
- Frank Mills as Townsman (36 episodes)
- Archie Butler as Townsman (32 episodes)
- Milan Smith as Townsman (16 episodes)
- Albert Cavens as Townsman (16 episodes)
- Tex Palmer as Townsman (15 episodes)
- Ray Jones as Townsman (11 episodes)
- Herman Hack as Townsman (10 episodes)
- Chick Hannan as Townsman (6 episodes)
- George Sowards as Townsman (6 episodes)
- Alex Sharp as Townsman (4 episodes)
- Cosmo Sardo as Dealer (7 episodes)

=== Guest cast ===
On September 25, 1956, Myron Healey played a drunken gunfighter Clay Allison, who comes into Dodge City to confront the Earp legend. In the story line, Pete Albright, a storeowner played by Charles Fredricks, tries to hire Allison to gun down Earp because the marshal is fighting crime in the town and costing merchants business in the process. Allison makes a point of not taking money, but is willing to challenge Earp until he is overcome by his own drunkenness. Mike Ragan played Clay Allison in a 1957 episode, "The Time for All Good Men".

== Production ==
=== Development ===
The series was produced by Desilu Productions and filmed at the Desilu-Cahuenga Studio. Sponsors included General Mills, Procter & Gamble, and Parker Pen Company. Off-camera the Ken Darby singers, a choral group, sang the theme song and hummed the background music. The theme song "The Legend of Wyatt Earp" was composed by Harry Warren with lyrics by Harold Adamson. Incidental music was composed by Herman Stein.

=== Casting ===
O'Brian was chosen for the role in part because of his physical resemblance to early photographs of Wyatt Earp.

Douglas Fowley and Myron Healey were cast 49 and 10 times, respectively, as Earp's close friend John H. "Doc" Holliday.

Mason Alan Dinehart, or Alan Dinehart, III, son of film stars Alan Dinehart and Mozelle Britton, was cast in 34 episodes between 1955 and 1959 as Bat Masterson, a role filled on the NBC series of the same name by Gene Barry. Dinehart played Masterson from the ages of 19 to 23.

Many episodes show Douglas Fowley as playing the part of Doc Fabrique when he actually is not in the episodes. O'Flynn was left off the credits most of the time.

Bob Steele played Wyatt's deputy, Sam, in four episodes in 1955 during the Wichita period.

=== Use of Buntline Special ===
In the show, O'Brian carried a Colt Buntline Special, a revolver with a 12-inch barrel, which triggered a mild toy craze at the time the series was originally broadcast. No credible evidence has been found that Wyatt Earp ever owned such a gun. The myth of Earp carrying a Buntline Special was created in Stuart N. Lake's best-selling 1931 biography Wyatt Earp: Frontier Marshal, later admitted by the author to be highly fictionalized.

=== Historical accuracy ===
In contrast to the always-ethical character portrayed in the series, the real-life Wyatt Earp was at various times on either side of the law, having been accused of horse stealing, criminal assault, and involvement with fight-fixing, gambling, prostitution, and murders.

The real Wyatt Earp was elected town constable of Lamar, Missouri, in 1870, and became a Wichita, Kansas policeman in 1873. He was appointed as an assistant marshal in Dodge City around May 1876, spent the winter of 1876–77 in Deadwood, Dakota Territory, and rejoined the Dodge City police force as an assistant marshal in spring 1877. He resigned his position in September 1879.

Earp is depicted as the town marshal in Tombstone, although his brother Virgil Earp was Deputy U.S. Marshal and Tombstone City Marshal. As city marshal, Virgil made the decision to enforce a city ordinance prohibiting carrying weapons in town and to disarm the outlaw cowboys that led to the Gunfight at the O.K. Corral. Wyatt was only a temporary assistant marshal to his brother.

== Episodes ==
Season	Episodes	Originally released		Rank	Average viewership (in millions)
Season	Episodes	First released	Last released	Rank	Average viewership (in millions)
1	33	September 6, 1955	April 17, 1956	Not in top 30	N/A
2	39	August 18, 1956	June 4, 1957	18	12.0
3	39	September 17, 1957	June 10, 1958	6	13.7
4	37	September 16, 1958	May 26, 1959	10	12.8
5	41	September 1, 1959	June 7, 1960	20	11.4
6	37	September 27, 1960	June 27, 1961	Not in top 30	N/A

== Reception ==
=== Ratings ===
The Life and Legend of Wyatt Earp finished number 18 in the Nielsen ratings for the 1956–1957 season, number six in 1957–1958, number 10 in 1958–1959, and number 20 in 1959–1960.

=== Awards ===
The series received two Emmy nominations in 1957. Hugh O'Brian was nominated for Best Continuing Performance by an Actor, and Dan Ullman earned a nomination for Best Teleplay Writing - Half Hour or Less.

== Home media ==
Infinity Entertainment Group released the complete first season on DVD in Region 1 for the first time on April 21, 2009. This release has been discontinued and is now out of print. On October 28, 2011, Inception Media Group acquired the rights to the series. It subsequently re-released the first season on DVD on December 13, 2011. Season two was released on March 12, 2013.

DVD name	Ep #	Release date
Season 1	33	December 13, 2011
Season 2	39	March 12, 2013

== Related shows ==
O'Brian recreated the role of Earp in two episodes of the CBS television series Guns of Paradise (1990) alongside Gene Barry as Bat Masterson and again in 1991 in The Gambler Returns: The Luck of the Draw, also with Barry as Masterson. An independent movie, Wyatt Earp: Return to Tombstone, was released in 1994 featuring new footage of O'Brian as Earp mixed with flashbacks consisting of colorized scenes from the original series. The new sequences co-starred Bruce Boxleitner (who had himself played Earp in the telefilm I Married Wyatt Earp), Paul Brinegar (who later joined the Rawhide cast), Harry Carey, Jr. (who had, a year earlier, played Marshal Fred White in Tombstone), and Bo Hopkins.

With the emergence of television in the 1950s, producers spun out a large number of Western-oriented shows. At the height of their popularity in 1959, more than two dozen "cowboy" programs were on weekly. At least five others were connected to some extent with Wyatt Earp: Bat Masterson, Tombstone Territory, Broken Arrow, Johnny Ringo, and Gunsmoke.

Episodes of The Life and Legend of Wyatt Earp are rebroadcast on the cable television network, Grit. Two episodes of the show were aired daily on Cozi TV until it was removed. FETV currently airs the show as of April 29, 2024. It can also be found on some streaming services, such as Tubi. UK television network Talking Pictures TV began a re-run of series 1 from Wednesday 24 July 2024.
