= As the Devil Commands =

- Directed by: Roy William Neill
- Screenplay by: Jo Swerling
- Story by: Keene Thompson
- Starring: Alan Dinehart; Mae Clarke; Neil Hamilton
- Cinematography: Joseph August
- Production company: Columbia Pictures
- Release date: December 24, 1932 (US)
- Running time: 70 minutes
- Country: United States
- Language: English

As the Devil Commands is a 1932 American pre-Code film written by Jo Swerling from a story by Keene Thompson. It is directed by Roy William Neill and stars Alan Dinehart, Mae Clarke and Neil Hamilton.

== Plot ==
When John Duncan becomes ill, he moves in with his cousin, Robert Waldo, who is an attorney. As his illness worsens, his doctor, David Graham, gives him the bad news that it is terminal. When Duncan decides to split his estate between Waldo and Graham, Waldo hatches a plot which he feels will allow him to inherit the entire fortune. The first step involves convincing Duncan to leave his whole fortune to Graham in his will. With Graham now having a perfect motive for murder, Waldo plans to kill Duncan and frame Graham.

As Christmas approaches, Duncan's illness has progressed to the point where he is now a totally helpless invalid. Suffering, Duncan begs Graham to end his suffering, but Graham refuses. Waldo connives Graham to go to a party, getting him out of the house. He also hires Wilfred Morgan, a tramp, to go to the party, to make sure that Graham does not return too early. However, Morgan gets drunk and does not leave the mansion. Thinking that he is alone with Duncan, he administers the necessary overdose to kill Duncan. Unbeknownst to him, Morgan wakes up long enough to witness the murder.

After Duncan's death, Graham is tried for the murder. He is ineptly defended by Waldo, who is hoping for a conviction and a death sentence, which if it happens, he will be the sole heir to Duncan's fortune. However, while Graham is convicted, he is sentenced to life in prison, rather than death. This foils Waldo's plans, since as long as Graham is alive, Waldo cannot inherit. So Waldo forges a fake suicide note for Duncan, which he presents after "finding" it amongst Duncan's effects, thus obtaining Graham's exoneration and release.

He plans to kill Graham and make it look like an accident, but a hiccup occurs when Morgan resurfaces and blackmails Waldo with his eyewitness testimony of Duncan's murder. Needing to get rid of the tramp, so he runs him down with his car. Thinking Morgan is dead, he goes back to the mansion, where he tricks Graham into going into the wine cellar, where Waldo has lit numerous candles, which will quickly use up all the oxygen in the room, asphyxiating Graham. However, Morgan is not dead, just mortally injured. He manages to make his way to Jane's house, who is Graham's assistant. Before dying he tells her that it was Waldo who ran him over, as well as being the one to give Duncan his fatal overdose. She calls the police, then grabs her gun and heads over to the mansion. She tries to get Waldo to tell her where Graham is, but he refuses. They struggle and Jane shoots him. Then the police arrive, and they discover Graham in time to save him.

== Cast ==
- Mae Clarke as Jane Chase
- Alan Dinehart as Robert Waldo
- Neil Hamilton as Dr. David Graham
- Charles Sellon as John Duncan
- Charles Coleman as Malcom
- John Sheehan as Wilfred Morgan

== Production ==
The film had the working title of Acquitted, which was changed shortly before its release in December 1932, to As the Devil Commands.

== Reception ==
The Missoulian gave it a good review, calling it a "powerful dramatic story". The Austin American gave the film a mostly positive review, applauding the work of Dinehart, Hamilton, and Clarke, although they felt the romantic elements of the picture were a bit thin.
