= Scissors (film) =

1991 film by Frank De Felitta

- Directed by: Frank De Felitta
- Screenplay by: Frank de Felitta
- Story by: Joyce Selznick
- Produced by: Don Levin; Mel Pearl; Hal W. Polaire
- Starring: Sharon Stone; Steve Railsback; Michelle Phillips; Ronny Cox
- Cinematography: Anthony B. Richmond
- Edited by: John F. Schreyer
- Music by: Alfi Kabiljo
- Distributed by: D.D.M. Film Corp.
- Release date: March 22, 1991
- Running time: 105 minutes
- Country: United States
- Language: English

Scissors is a 1991 American psychological thriller film directed by Frank De Felitta and starring Sharon Stone, Ronny Cox, Steve Railsback, and Michelle Phillips. The plot centers on the life of Angela Anderson (Sharon Stone), a sexually repressed woman who becomes trapped in a mysterious apartment.

== Plot ==
Angela Anderson buys a pair of large scissors from a hardware shop. On her way home, she is attacked in the elevator of her apartment block by a red-bearded man, whom she stabs with the scissors in self-defense. Immediately after the attack, Angela is found by the twin brothers who live next door to her. The first brother Alex Morgan is the star of a successful soap opera, whereas the other, Cole, is an artist and wheelchair user. An attraction develops between Angela and Alex, which is constantly restrained by Angela's sexual repression. Hypnotherapy sessions with her psychiatrist Dr. Stephan Carter reveal a red-bearded man named Billy in Angela's past, a startling coincidence to her recent attack.

Following her attack in the elevator, the increasing attention from Alex, and the fear of Cole she develops, Angela's sheltered world starts to fall apart. After another encounter with her red-bearded attacker, and harassment from Cole, Angela finds herself lured with the prospect of a job to a large and mysterious apartment, where she finds herself trapped.

In the master bedroom, Angela finds the body of her red-bearded attacker, who has been murdered with the same pair of scissors she bought earlier. The only other living thing in the apartment with her is a caged raven, which caws repeatedly that Angela killed him. As Angela explores the apartment, she finds it is full of exhibits relating to her own psychology; at this point, someone clearly wants to drive Angela into insanity.

Meanwhile, Alex has discovered that Angela is missing, and while trying to discover her whereabouts, Cole suddenly stands up from his wheelchair, attacks Alex, and then mysteriously leaves.

After many failed escape attempts, Angela takes the raven from its cage, ties a message to its leg, and using the blood-stained scissors to remove a vent cover, releases the raven into an air vent. Angela wakes up the following morning to find that the body of her attacker has been moved to the dining room, and the mutilated corpse of the raven sits on a plate before it. The sight of this causes Angela to collapse in shock, where she experiences a childhood flashback. In the flashback, her red-bearded stepfather Billy is murdered by her mother with a pair of scissors before her eyes – the horror being the root of her repression.

The next day, the apartment is visited by Dr. Carter's wife, Ann, who is having an affair with the owner. She arrives to find her husband waiting for her, disguised in a red beard, revealing that he was Angela's attacker. He reveals to his wife that when he learned of the affair, he murdered her lover with a pair of scissors and had set Angela up to take the fall, who is revealed to be suffering from schizophrenia, by luring her to the apartment, and exploiting what he had discovered about her past during hypnotherapy sessions. Carter convinces his horrified but politically ambitious wife to go along with the frame, and they set out to find the scissors used in the murder, since they may be used as evidence against him. While wandering in a trance-like state, Angela ventures through the main door (carelessly left open by Carter), closing it behind her and trapping Carter and Ann inside. Carter attempts to lure Angela back by posing as Billy, but to no avail.

Outside, Angela is rescued by Alex, who had tracked her to the apartment's address. A trapped Carter bangs the scissors furiously against the glass of the window, as a liberated Angela looks back with a vengeful smile.

== Cast ==
- Sharon Stone as Angela Anderson
  - Kelly Noonan as Young Angela Anderson
- Steve Railsback as Alex and Cole Morgan
- Ronny Cox as Dr. Stephan Carter
- Michelle Phillips as Ann Carter
- Vicki Frederick as Nancy
- Leonard Rogel as Red Beard
- Carl Ciarfalio as Attacker
- Howie Guma as Clerk
- Larry Moss as Kramer
- Paul Austin Kelly as Folger
- Albert Popwell as Officer
- Jim Shankman as Bob, The Clerk
- Jesse Garcia as Counterman
- Hal Riddle as Dog Walker
- Laura Ann Caufield as Soap Opera Actress
- George Fisher as The Attacker
- Ivy Jones as Mother
- Will Leskin as Billy

== Production ==
Plans to create Scissors were first announced in 1989; actors Sharon Stone and Steve Railsback were confirmed as starring in the film. Railsback trained for his role with boxer Rany Shields, and filming started on January 15, 1990, in Culver City, California.

== Release ==
Scissors had its world premiere on March 22, 1991, at the Laemmle Monica Theater in Santa Monica, California. Per AFI, this opening was an example of four-wall distribution.

== Reception ==
Critical reception for Scissors was generally negative, and Peter Ranier of the Los Angeles Times wrote, "If you’re unlucky, or foolhardy, enough to find yourself in the Monica Theatre for a screening of “Scissors,” you might while away the time noting how it botches just about every thriller cliche ever invented." In 2015, William Harrison reviewed the movie for DVD Talk, calling it "an interesting but bizarrely flawed psychological thriller", recommending that viewers watch Basic Instinct, instead.
