= Mason Alan Dinehart =

American actor

- Born: Mason Alan Dinehart III; 1936 (age 89–90)
- Other names: Alan Dinehart, III; Mase Dinehart
- Occupations: Actor (retired 1960); Business consultant
- Years active: 1948–1960
- Children: 8
- Parent(s): Alan Dinehart; Mozelle Britton

Mason Alan Dinehart (born 1936) is an American business consultant and retired actor best known for his role as a youthful Bat Masterson in 34 episodes between 1955 and 1959 of the ABC/Desilu television series The Life and Legend of Wyatt Earp, starring Hugh O'Brian in the title role of the frontier marshal Wyatt Earp. He is also known as Mason Alan Dinehart III, Alan Dinehart III, and Mase Dinehart.

== Family background ==
In 1936, he legally changed his name to Mason Alan Dinehart, the same name as his father, so that his younger son from the second marriage could be known as Mason Alan Dinehart III. This name change created confusion because the senior Dinehart's first son from his first marriage was already Alan Dinehart Jr, the former animation and voice director for Hanna-Barbera.

== Bat Masterson ==
Dinehart played the youthful Bat Masterson who is the protege of Wyatt Earp in learning the proper techniques of frontier law enforcement. Earp usually calls him "Mr. Masterson". In a 1956 episode "Bat Masterson Again," Earp shows young Masterson the proper use of a pistol. During this time Masterson was elected sheriff of Ford County, Kansas, which includes the county seat of Dodge City. Bill Tilghman had been denied the right to run for sheriff again. Earp as an appointed town marshal works with an elected sheriff, and their differences in jurisdiction do not cause any problems. Bat's brother, Ed Masterson, played by Brad Johnson, formerly the deputy sheriff on the Annie Oakley television series, is shot in an ambush by drunken cowboys, and Masterson settles the score. When Earp finally comes to Tombstone, Arizona Territory, he lacks the working relationship with Sheriff Johnny Behan that he had in Kansas with Bat Masterson.

Dinehart's performance of Masterson was so highly regarded that ABC offered him a spinoff series, but he declined, soon left acting, and entered the business field. Dinehart's last appearance on the series is the episode "Dodge Is Civilized" (April 28, 1959), in which he serves notice that he is headed to Tombstone, where he hopes Earp will join him in time. There is never a reunion show, and the Masterson character, now a gambler, is written out of The Life and Legend of Wyatt Earp. The historical Earp did visit Tombstone to see his friend Masterson, who in time became a figure of western folklore, finishing his long career as a sportswriter in New York City. Masterson's hat inspired the name of the Brown Derby restaurants in Los Angeles.

By the time Dinehart left The Life and Legend of Wyatt Earp, Gene Barry had already assumed for nearly a year the role of a more mature Masterson, one in his early forties, in the NBC western series Bat Masterson. Some viewers complained of the change in actors portraying Bat Masterson, but in time Barry was the one most remembered for the role, not Dinehart, who left show business.

== Post-acting career ==
Dinehart's business career began around 1960 with Bank of America. He is now a consultant in litigation and arbitration for FEND, a company based in Los Angeles.
