= Love Has Many Faces =

1965 film by Alexander Singer

- film poster by Howard Terpning
- Directed by: Alexander Singer
- Written by: Marguerite Roberts
- Produced by: Jerry Bresler
- Starring: Lana Turner; Cliff Robertson; Hugh O'Brian
- Cinematography: Joseph Ruttenberg
- Edited by: Alma Macrorie
- Music by: David Raksin
- Production company: Jerry Bresler Productions
- Distributed by: Columbia Pictures
- Release date: February 24, 1965 (New York City)
- Running time: 105 minutes
- Country: United States
- Language: English
- Box office: $1,100,000

Love Has Many Faces is a 1965 American drama film directed by Alexander Singer and starring Lana Turner, Cliff Robertson and Hugh O'Brian. It was written by Marguerite Roberts. Nancy Wilson sings the title song and Edith Head designed Lana Turner's clothes.

== Plot ==
When a dead American "beach boy" is washed up on a beach in Acapulco, the police investigate to see whether it was murder. Lieutenant Riccardo Andrade of the Mexican police interviews three suspects. Hank Walker is another beach boy who works as a gigolo as well as blackmails vacationing middle-aged American women. Pete Jordan is a former beach boy who married rich American Kit. She met Pete when he was selling his blood and bought all of him. The dead man was wearing a bracelet engraved "LOVE IS THIN ICE," which the police discover was given to him by Kit. They also discover that he'd had an affair with her.

In addition to the police, the dead American's deserted girlfriend, Carol Lambert, comes to Mexico to find out about her ex-boyfriend's death.

== Cast ==
- Lana Turner as Katherine Lawson "Kit" Chandler Jordan
- Cliff Robertson as Pete Jordan
- Hugh O'Brian as Hank Walker
- Ruth Roman as Margot Eliot
- Stefanie Powers as Carol Lambert
- Virginia Grey as Irene Talbot
- Ron Husmann as Chuck Austin
- Enrique Lucero as Lieutenant Riccardo Andrade
- Carlos Montalbán as Don Julian
- Jaime Bravo as Manuel Perez
- Fanny Schiller as Maria
- René Dupeyrón as Ramos

== Critical reception ==
The New York Times was critical of the film, writing, “Everything has been done to make Lana Turner feel at home in Love Has Many Faces, starting geographically. The picture, shot in color in Acapulco and Mexico City, provides a radiant background of natural scenery and swanky interiors as befits a glamour queen...It’s all here — everything but a good picture. For this dramatic Columbia round-up of some resort parasites...is the glossiest kind of junk, even for Miss Turner. If ever baloney needed mustard, it was yesterday. There must have been some lying around Acapulco Beach, along with the cast...Miss Turner is finally done in by a bull. That’s right—a bull. There’s plenty of it in Love Has Many Faces.”

Variety wrote: "Alexander Singer's direction gets the utmost in values from his story and cast, although none of latter is particularly sympathetic. ... Miss Turner lends conviction in a demanding part and Robertson is forceful as her husband who married her for her money but finds his life distasteful."

Boxoffice wrote: "The rarefied atmosphere that only great wealth and ample leisure can create is presented in glowing Eastman Color and Lana Turner's blonde and brown-skinned beauty is further glorified by the Edith Head wardrobe that makes women in the audience gasp."

== See also ==
- List of American films of 1965
