= Albert Popwell =

American actor (1926–1999)

- Popwell in Dirty Harry (1971)
- Born: July 15, 1926; New York City, New York, U.S.
- Died: April 9, 1999 (aged 72); Los Angeles, California, U.S.
- Other name: Poppy
- Occupations: Actor; dancer
- Years active: 1943–1995

Albert Popwell (July 15, 1926 – April 9, 1999) was an American actor and dancer.

== Life and early career ==
Albert Popwell was born on July 15, 1926, in New York City to South American and West Indian parents. He was nicknamed Poppy by his classmates in Harlem.

Popwell was intrigued by acting at a young age and started as a professional dancer before taking up a career in acting. Popwell made his professional debut on Broadway at age 16 in The Pirate with Alfred Lunt and Lynn Fontanne. He went on star in future Broadway productions such as Mister Wonderful with Sammy Davis Jr. and Golden Boy.

== Later career ==
Popwell moved to Los Angeles in 1967 to further his career and actor-director Carl Reiner helped open doors for him upon moving to California.

Popwell spoke of having three godfathers, Clint Eastwood, Carl Reiner, and Leslie Stevens, the latter of whom gave Popwell one of his first television roles in the series Search. Popwell said, "These are people who have been quite inspirational in my career."

At one point, Carl Reiner was set to cast Popwell in a film called Summer Dreams opposite actress Beverly Todd. The film was to be about a psychiatrist who is approached by a police officer to help unravel a murder mystery.

Popwell launched his start with Malpaso Productions, Clint Eastwood's production company, after his role in 1968's Coogan's Bluff as a blade-wielding hippie. Popwell stated his performance impressed Eastwood and asked him to be part of his repertoire company because he liked his work.

Popwell was featured on many television series, but is perhaps best known for his appearances in films opposite Clint Eastwood, with whom he appeared in five films, beginning with Coogan's Bluff (1968) and in the first four Dirty Harry films, playing a different character in each film. Popwell was the wounded bank robber at the receiving end of Eastwood's iconic "Do I feel lucky?" monologue from Dirty Harry (1971). He was a murderous pimp in Magnum Force (1973), appeared as militant Big Ed Mustapha in The Enforcer (1976), a film Popwell said he had not planned on being in. Another actor had been cast in the role of Mustapha in The Enforcer but director James Fargo felt the other actor did not have the proper feel for the role. With time getting down to the wire, Fargo and Eastwood immediately put in a call for their self-described "good luck charm." Popwell later portrayed Dirty Harry's detective colleague Horace King in Sudden Impact (1983). In 1988, Popwell was offered a role in The Dead Pool, the last film in the series, but could not appear due to a scheduling conflict.

Popwell was also cast in another film by Dirty Harry director Don Siegel, 1973's Charley Varrick.

Popwell's penultimate film role was with Sharon Stone in Scissors (1991).

== Death ==
He died at age 72 in 1999, from complications following open-heart surgery.

== Selected filmography ==
- Journey to Shiloh (1968) – Samuel
- Coogan's Bluff (1968) – Wonderful Digby
- Night Gallery (1970, episode: "The Nature of the Enemy") – Reporter
- Dirty Harry (1971) - Bank Robber
- The Peace Killers (1971) – Blackjack
- Search (1972) – Griffin
- Glass Houses (1972) – Albert
- Fuzz (1972) – Lewis
- Cleopatra Jones (1973) – Matthew Johnson
- Charley Varrick (1973) – Percy Randolph
- Magnum Force (1973) – Pimp, J.J. Wilson
- The Single Girls (1974) – Morris
- Lost in the Stars (1974)
- Emergency! (1975, episode: "905-Wild") – Officer Les Taylor
- Cleopatra Jones and the Casino of Gold (1975) – Matthew Johnson
- The Streets of San Francisco (1975, episode: "Poisoned Snow") – Nappy
- Sanford and Son (1976, episode: "Sanford and Gong") – Doctor Davis
- The Enforcer (1976) – Big Ed Mustapha
- The Buddy Holly Story (1978) – Eddie
- Wonder Woman (1978, episode: "The Deadly Dolphin") – Gaffer
- Butterflies in Heat (1979) – Ned
- Buck Rogers in the 25th Century (1979, episode: "Cosmic Whiz Kid") – Koren
- The Incredible Hulk (1980, episode: "Long Run Home") - Doctor
- The A-Team (1983, episode: "The Out-Of Towners") – Digger
- Sudden Impact (1983) – Horace King
- Magnum, P.I. (1986, episode: "Missing Melody") – David Crawford
- Who's That Girl (1987) – Parole Chairman
- The Siege of Firebase Gloria (1989) – Jones
- Wild at Heart (1990) – Barkeeper at Zanzibar (scenes deleted)
- Scissors (1991) - Officer
- A Last Goodbye (1995) – O.C. Lee
