= Wyatt Earp: Return to Tombstone =

1994 TV film

- Genre: Western
- Written by: Dan Ullman; Rob Word
- Directed by: Paul Landres; Frank McDonald
- Starring: Hugh O'Brian; Bruce Boxleitner; Paul Brinegar
- Music by: Dana Walden
- Country of origin: United States
- Original language: English

Production
- Executive producer: Stanton Rutledge
- Producers: Phil May; Joseph J. Shields
- Production locations: Tombstone, Arizona; Sonoran Desert
- Cinematography: James W. Roberson
- Editors: David Gaudio; Mark Ruggio; Jayme Wing
- Running time: 100 minutes
- Production companies: Associated Images; CST Featurization

Original release
- Network: CBS
- Release: July 1, 1994

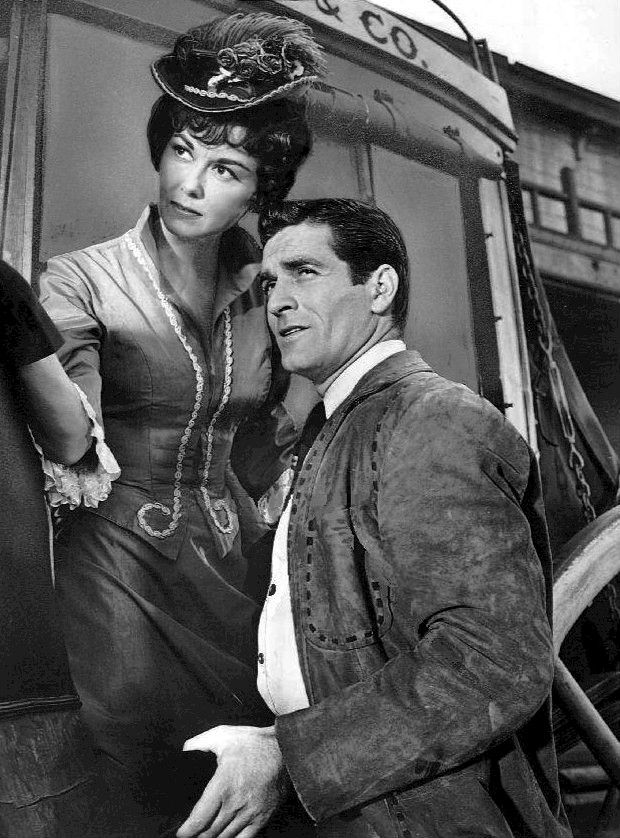
Hugh O'Brian as Wyatt Earp (with Adele Mara)

Wyatt Earp: Return to Tombstone is a 1994 American Western television film starring Hugh O'Brian as Wyatt Earp, featuring new footage mixed with colorized sequences from O'Brian's 1955–1961 television series The Life and Legend of Wyatt Earp.

The supporting cast for the new footage includes Bruce Boxleitner, Paul Brinegar, Harry Carey, Jr., Bo Hopkins, and Don Meredith. The colorized flashback archival footage from the original television series features Douglas Fowley as Doc Holliday and Lloyd Corrigan as Ned Buntline. The movie was directed by Paul Landres and Frank McDonald.

== Cast ==
- Hugh O'Brian as Wyatt Earp
- Bruce Boxleitner as Sheriff Sam, Sheriff of Cochise County
- Paul Brinegar as Jim "Dog" Kelly
- Harry Carey, Jr. as "Digger" Phelps
- Bo Hopkins as "Rattlesnake" Reynolds
- Alex Hyde-White as Woodworth Clum
- Martin Kove as Ed Ross
- Don Meredith as Clay, The Bartender
- Jay Underwood as Jack Montgomery
- Douglas Fowley as John "Doc" Holliday / "Doc" Fabrique (flashback sequences)
- John Anderson as Virgil Earp (flashback sequence)
- Dirk London as Morgan Earp (flashback sequence)
- Rayford Barnes as Joe "Ike" Clanton (flashback sequence)
- Steve Brodie as Sheriff Johnny Behan (flashback sequence)
- Lloyd Corrigan as Ned Buntline (flashback sequence)

== Production ==
In November 1993, it was announced episodes from the television series The Life and Legend of Wyatt Earp would be colorized and re-edited into three to six television films in order to tap into renewed public interest in Wyatt Earp with the upcoming releases of Tombstone and Wyatt Earp. CST Entertainment Imaging, a company specializing in film colorization, created a new division called Featurizations Inc. whose intent was to find dormant older black-and-white television series that would be good candidates for re-edit and colorization to television films. Original series star, Hugh O'Brian, was brought back to shoot wraparound footage that would serve to bookend the repurposed footage which would be shot in black-and-white and then colorized in order to make the film quality match.

In February 1994, it was announced CBS had acquired the first film, Wyatt Earp: Return to Tombstone for broadcast during Summer around the theatrical release of Wyatt Earp.

== Unrealized follow-ups ==
Featurizations Inc. had planned for two to five additional colorized television films with the second entry Wyatt's Women announced to have been in pre-production in February 1994. Ultimately no further films were made.
