= Mozelle Britton =

American actress

- Born: Inehart Mozelle Britton; May 2, 1912; Oklahoma City, Oklahoma, U.S.
- Died: May 18, 1953 (aged 41); Los Angeles, California, U.S.
- Resting place: Forest Lawn Memorial Park, Glendale, California, U.S.
- Other name: Mozelle Brittonne
- Education: Pasadena Playhouse
- Occupations: Actress, casting director, and songwriter
- Years active: 1930–1936
- Spouse(s): Alan Dinehart (m. 1933–1944, his death); Thomas W. Gosser (m. 1948–1953, her death; separated prior to her death)
- Children: Mason Alan Dinehart

Inehart Mozelle Britton (May 2, 1912 – May 18, 1953) was an American actress, casting director, newspaper columnist, and songwriter. She was sometimes billed as Mozelle Brittonne.

== Personal life ==
Britton was the daughter of Mr. and Mrs. A. V. Britton, and she graduated from Classen High School. She was wed on June 28, 1933.

== Career ==
On Broadway, billed as Mozelle Brittone, she portrayed May in Alley Cat (1934) and Linda Roberts in Separate Rooms (1940).

== Death ==
Britton died, aged 41, at the Good Samaritan Hospital in Los Angeles, where she had been under treatment for a heart ailment. According to her sister, Mrs. Allamae Gingg, Britton's death was hastened by overwork. She had been preparing a benefit show in San Diego for the American Cancer Society. She and her first husband are entombed together at Forest Lawn Memorial Park in Glendale, California.

== Selected filmography ==
- 1930 Paramount on Parade
- 1934 The Fighting Ranger
- 1936 Night Waitress
- 1936 Rainbow on the River

== Sources ==
- Los Angeles Times, May 19, 1953, "Mozelle Dinehart, 41, Widow of actor, Dies".
- Los Angeles Times, June 17, 1953, "Alan Dinehart's Widow Wills Mother estate"
