= Search (American TV series) =

- Title screen
- Genre: Science fiction
- Created by: Leslie Stevens
- Starring: Hugh O'Brian; Tony Franciosa; Doug McClure; Burgess Meredith; Angel Tompkins; Byron Chung; Albert Popwell; Ginny Golden
- Theme music composer: Dominic Frontiere
- Composer: Dominic Frontiere
- Country of origin: United States
- Original language: English
- No. of seasons: 1
- No. of episodes: 23

Production
- Executive producer: Leslie Stevens
- Producers: John Strong; Robert H. Justman; Anthony Spinner
- Cinematography: John M. Stephens
- Editors: Nick Archer; Joseph Dervin
- Running time: 45 minutes approx.
- Production companies: Leslie Stevens Productions; Warner Bros. Television

Original release
- Network: NBC
- Release: September 13, 1972 – August 29, 1973

Related
- Probe

Search is an American science fiction series that aired on Wednesday nights on NBC at 10 pm ET, from September 1972 to August 1973. It ran for 23 episodes, not including the two-hour pilot film originally titled Probe. When picked up for series production, the title had to be changed because Probe was the name of an existing PBS series.

In the UK, the series aired on BBC1 under the title Search Control. In Spain, the series aired on TVE 1 under the title Investigación (Investigation). In Italy, the series aired under the title Search. It was called Operación Rescate (Rescue Operation) in Argentina. In Brazil, the series aired on TV Globo under the title Controle Remoto (Remote Control).

The show was created by Leslie Stevens, and produced by Stevens, Robert H. Justman, John Strong and Anthony Spinner. The high concept was described as "science fiction in today's world" and the episodes featured many high-tech elements that are now considered common in current science fiction shows.

== Plot ==
The series centers on World Securities Corporation, a high-tech international private investigation company that employs field operatives, the elite of whom, probes, are aided by implanted audio receivers and scanners, tiny video camera/telemetry units that can be attached to tie clips or other jewelry. A common method is to wear the scanner on a ring, enabling it to be discreetly aimed.

Each episode features one of three primary agents on investigations which often have political or organized crime elements.

The probes do not carry firearms and while they and other characters are regularly in jeopardy, deaths are rare.

Search finished in the Nielsen ratings for the 1972-1973 TV season with a 14.6 average audience. It was rated #63 out of #75 shows for that season.

== Cast ==
Search was featured in the November 1972 edition of TV Guide, with an illustration of the three actors playing the show's "probes" on the cover.

=== Probe field agents ===
- Hugh O'Brian as Hugh Lockwood, Probe One - lead operative (eight episodes and pilot)
- Tony Franciosa as Nick Bianco, head of Omega division, which specializes in organized-crime cases (eight episodes)
- Doug McClure as C.R. Grover, standby probe - described as an emergency backup agent on his first appearance, he nonetheless appears in seven episodes.

The three main characters are rotated between episodes. Only one is featured per show, and they do not have any scenes together.

=== Probe control staff ===
- Burgess Meredith as V.C.R. Cameron, Director of Probe Control Unit 1
- Tom Hallick as Harris, deputy director of Probe Control Unit 1
- Angel Tompkins as Gloria Harding, senior medical technician monitoring pulse, respiration, and temperature
- Albert Popwell as Albert Griffin, linguist and code-breaker; former chief translator at the United Nations
- Byron Chung as Kuroda, telemetry and electronics specialist
- Amy Farrell as Amy Murdock, medical doctor
- Ginny Golden as Ginny Keach, data specialist
- Ron Castro as Carlos Lobos, technician

== Probe Control ==
Probe agents report to V.C.R. Cameron (Burgess Meredith), the director of the investigations, who runs Probe Control, a center reminiscent of the NASA Mission Control Center. "Cam" is the leader of the expert team who monitors and provides the agent with intelligence.

On-duty experts include a translator fluent in several languages and a medical-telemetry specialist.

Early in the series the Probe Control set was placed in a darkened isolated space, alluding to a large-scale operations center. By the middle of the season, the control room was scaled down and relocated to a well-lit but smaller "bunker" room. According to the show's credits, the computer equipment was provided by Control Data Corporation.

Two modern buildings were shown as the headquarters for World Securities Corporation. In the pilot movie, 555 California Street in San Francisco was used. This building, completed in 1969, was once the headquarters building for Bank of America. In the TV series, World Securities headquarters was 600 Commonwealth Avenue in Los Angeles. This is actually the Central Civil West Courthouse, which belongs to the Central Judicial District of Los Angeles.

== Probe hardware ==
Each field agent is outfitted with a miniature scanner disguised as a piece of jewelry, which can be magnetically attached to special cuff links, tie clips, rings or pendants. This device continuously monitors the agent's progress, transmitting audio, video, and physical telemetry to Probe Control. These images were stabilized and rotated to permit real-time observation by a team of specialists at Probe Control who analyze the data, consult databases worldwide, and immediately provide information covertly to the field agent via a subcutaneous ear piece (or "earjack") implanted in the agent's mastoid process. (First-generation earjacks had platinum housings, later replaced with zirconium for unspecified reasons.) The agent can respond to Probe Control either audibly (via the microphone in the scanner) or by tapping out code with a dental implant, even when they don't have their scanner operating.

== Episodes ==
No.	Title	Starring	Directed by	Written by	Original release date	Prod. code	DVD
0	"Probe (pilot)"	Hugh O'Brian	Russ Mayberry	Leslie Stevens	February 11, 1972	Unknown	n/a
Original pilot film (DVD available separately). Lockwood hunts for missing diamonds stolen by Hermann Goering during World War II.
1	"The Murrow Disappearance"	Hugh O'Brian	Russ Mayberry	Leslie Stevens	September 13, 1972	166-111	1
A mysterious individual known only as "Saratoga" hires Probe Division to investigate a State Department official's disappearance.
2	"One of Our Probes is Missing"	Tony Franciosa	Phillip Leacock	Leslie Stevens	September 20, 1972	166-114	1
When Arthur Burrell, the Probe assigned to a counterfeiting case, disappears, Nick Bianco is assigned to find both Burrell and the counterfeiters, whose $100 bills are so perfect that they could cause an international monetary crisis.
3	"Short Circuit"	Doug McClure	Allen Reisner	Leslie Stevens	September 27, 1972	166-116	1
The brilliant but mentally unstable inventor of a device capable of remotely overloading and destroying any active electrical or electronic circuit is attempting to destroy Probe Control.
4	"Moonrock"	Hugh O'Brian	William Wiard	Leslie Stevens	October 4, 1972	166-113	1
A highly classified lunar sample — a giant diamond — disappears immediately after delivery by a World Securities courier, and Lockwood is sent to retrieve it.
5	"Live Men Tell Tales"	Tony Franciosa	Marc Daniels	Irving Pearlberg	October 11, 1972	166-118	2
Bianco is assigned the double task of investigating an international organized crime coup, and investigating the death of a Probe who had previously been assigned to the case.
6	"Operation Iceman"	Tony Franciosa	Robert Friend	S.S. Schweitzer	October 25, 1972	166-115	2
Bianco is in charge of a team of Probes, including his old mentor, David Pelham (Edward Mulhare), and Stephanie Burnside, the first female Probe seen in the series, to track down an assassin known only as "The Iceman." But why is the assassin always one step ahead of them?
7	"The Bullet"	Hugh O'Brian	William Wiard	Judy Burns	November 1, 1972	166-119	2
Lockwood is sent to find and retrieve an Eastern Bloc scientist who developed a highly toxic bullet coating, and wants to defect. Unfortunately, Lockwood is wounded by such a bullet, and has less than twelve hours to obtain the formula for the antidote.
8	"In Search of Midas"	Doug McClure	Nicholas Colasanto	J. Christoper Strong III & Michael R. Stein	November 8, 1972	166-117	2
Grover, assisted by gossip columnist Kate Dawes (Barbara Feldon), is sent to verify the continued existence of a reclusive billionaire industrialist. Grover's given names is established, along with the reason he goes by initials.
9	"The Adonis File"	Hugh O'Brian	Joseph Pevney	Jack Turley	November 15, 1972	166-120	3
A late night talk show host's secretary is kidnapped shortly before he announces his candidacy for the U. S. Senate, backed by a secretive and wealthy think-tank. So why is he (and the think-tank) in such a hurry to pay the five million dollar ransom? Deanna Lund co-stars as another medical telemetrist sent out to join a Probe in the field (albeit this time apparently without her own scanner and earjack).
10	"Flight to Nowhere"	Hugh O'Brian	Paul Stanley	Brad Radnitz	November 22, 1972	166-122	3
Lockwood is working for himself this time (with comparatively little backup from Probe Control): a cargo pilot friend has disappeared near Reno, aircraft, cargo, and all. So why are so many people suddenly out to kill him? Lockwood's first name reestablished (earlier scripts called him "John Lockwood," although "Hugh Lockwood" had been established in the pilot). Early appearance by Cheryl Ladd as Probe Control technician Amy Love. (Credited as Cheryl Stoppelmoor.)
11	"The Gold Machine"	Hugh O'Brian	Russ Mayberry	Leslie Stevens	December 20, 1972	166-112	3
This time, Gloria Harding (Angel Tompkins) makes it out into the field (without scanner or earjack), and Arthur Burrell (David Gilliam), the "missing" Probe from "One of our Probes . . . ," takes over her console, as Lockwood searches for a lost gold mine in Northern California. Mark Lenard ("Sarek" from Star Trek) guest-starred. This episode (severely condensed) became the Search ViewMaster packet. This episode also established Cameron's initials (though they had previously been established in the pilot, first early in the narrative, and again later in dialogue when Cameron introduces himself to the character of Streeter: "Mr. Streeter. V.C.R. Cameron director of Probe Control, Unit One."). Had this and "One of our Probes . . ." been aired in production number sequence, this would have introduced Burrell; dialogue when Burrell takes over Harding's station suggests this was the intent.
12	"Let Us Prey"	Tony Franciosa	Russ Mayberry	Don Balluck	January 3, 1973	166-123	3
Hell hath no fury like the woman Bianco scorned, nor like the wealthy megalomaniac who jealously desires her, and has the technical chops to reconfigure Bianco's earjack and use it against him in a most dangerous game.
13	"A Honeymoon to Kill"	Doug McClure	Russ Mayberry	S.S. Schweitzer	January 10, 1973	166-124	4
Grover is tasked with first finding, then protecting, the pacifistic, race-car-driving, "madcap heiress" of an Italian weapons magnate, on the run from a family bent on stopping her from formally taking possession of a trust that would give her control of the family business.
14	"The 24 Carat Hit"	Tony Franciosa	Russ Mayberry	Jack Turley	January 24, 1973	166-126	4
Bianco is on the case when Probe Ed Bain (Dane Clark) gets in over his head on a gold smuggling case: Bain's wife is killed, his daughter kidnapped, and he tries to rescue her on his own, with a bullet in his arm. Debut (at least in aired order) of the "brightly lit" Probe Control (though the lowest floor level in front of the main consoles is still black, leading one to believe this was the first episode filmed on the new bright set), and of two new technicians there.
15	"Numbered for Death"	Doug McClure	Allen Reisner	S.S. Schweitzer (teleplay), Lou Shaw and S.S. Schweitzer (story)	January 31, 1973	166-127	4
A blackmailed in-law pulls Grover, assisted by European Probe Trudi Hauser (Lauri Peters) into a case involving a compromised Swiss bank. (In this episode the lowest floor level of Probe Control is now white like the rest of the room.)
16	"Countdown to Panic"	Hugh O'Brian	Jerry Jameson	Judy Burns	February 7, 1973	166-128	4
Three divers came back from an experimental undersea outpost with a lethal virus. Now one of them, a friend and colleague of Lockwood's, has become paranoid, and escaped quarantine. Establishes that Lockwood was once an astronaut. The "brightly lit" Probe Control set is now less brightly lit.
17	"The Clayton Lewis Document"	Tony Franciosa	William Wiard	Norman Hudis	February 14, 1973	166-129	5
Bianco is called in by the wife of an old friend, a Presidential aide who is being blackmailed by those who want inside information on a disarmament conference. Rhonda Fleming guest stars. Rare scene of Cameron outside of Probe Control.
18	"Goddess of Destruction"	Doug McClure	Jerry Jameson	Irving Pearlberg	February 21, 1973	166-130	5
Searching for a stolen statue of Kali, Grover finds himself battling an apparent resurgence of the Cult of Thugs. Includes two scenes with Cameron outside Probe Control, and the only on-screen appearance of the Probe Control briefing narrator, played by Vernon Weddle, whose voice is heard in other episodes and the pilot movie.
19	"The Mattson Papers"	Tony Franciosa	William Wiard	S.S. Schweitzer and Don Balluck (teleplay), Don Balluck (story)	February 28, 1973	166-131	5
Terry Carter (Broadhurst, from McCloud, and Col. Tigh from Battlestar Galactica) guest stars as an executive (and ex-basketball player) being chased by gangsters because of evidence he'd uncovered. Bianco is assigned to find both him and the evidence.
20	"Moment of Madness"	Doug McClure	George McGowan	Richard Landau	March 14, 1973	Unknown	5
Cameron is kidnapped by an insane former POW of the North Koreans (Patrick O'Neal), who blames him for his imprisonment, and hopes to drive him insane. In Cameron's absence, Harris (Tom Hallick) takes over as Probe Control mission director.
21	"Ends of the Earth"	Tony Franciosa	Ralph Senensky	Robert C. Dennis	March 21, 1973	Unknown	6
The apparent suicide of an alleged embezzler, whose widow hires Probe to investigate, leads Bianco to infiltrate a most unusual travel agency: a front for a criminal counterpart to the Witness Protection Program. Diana Muldaur and Sebastian Cabot are prominent guest stars.
22	"Suffer My Child"	Hugh O'Brian	Russ Mayberry	Norman Hudis	March 28, 1973	166-121	6
Lockwood investigates the disappearance of a rich girl, on the occasion of her 21st birthday. Turns out she staged her own kidnapping, only to be kidnapped for real just as Lockwood is about to take her home. It also turns out that she has a secret. Note that this episode was held back from the first half of the season: the "dark" Probe Control is seen, complete with Kuroda, Murdock, and Griffin.
23	"The Packagers"	Doug McClure	Michael Caffey	Robert C. Dennis	April 11, 1973	166-125	6
Grover is assigned to investigate the disappearance of an exiled revolutionary from a third-world country: kidnapped, assassinated, or planning a coup? And how do a retired general and his chauffeur fit in? Also held back from the first half of the season, with Griffin's cryptographic skills featured.

== Home media ==
On February 4, 2014, Warner Bros. released Search: The Complete Series on DVD in Region 1, via their Warner Archive Collection.
