= Hugh O'Brian =

American actor (1925–2016)

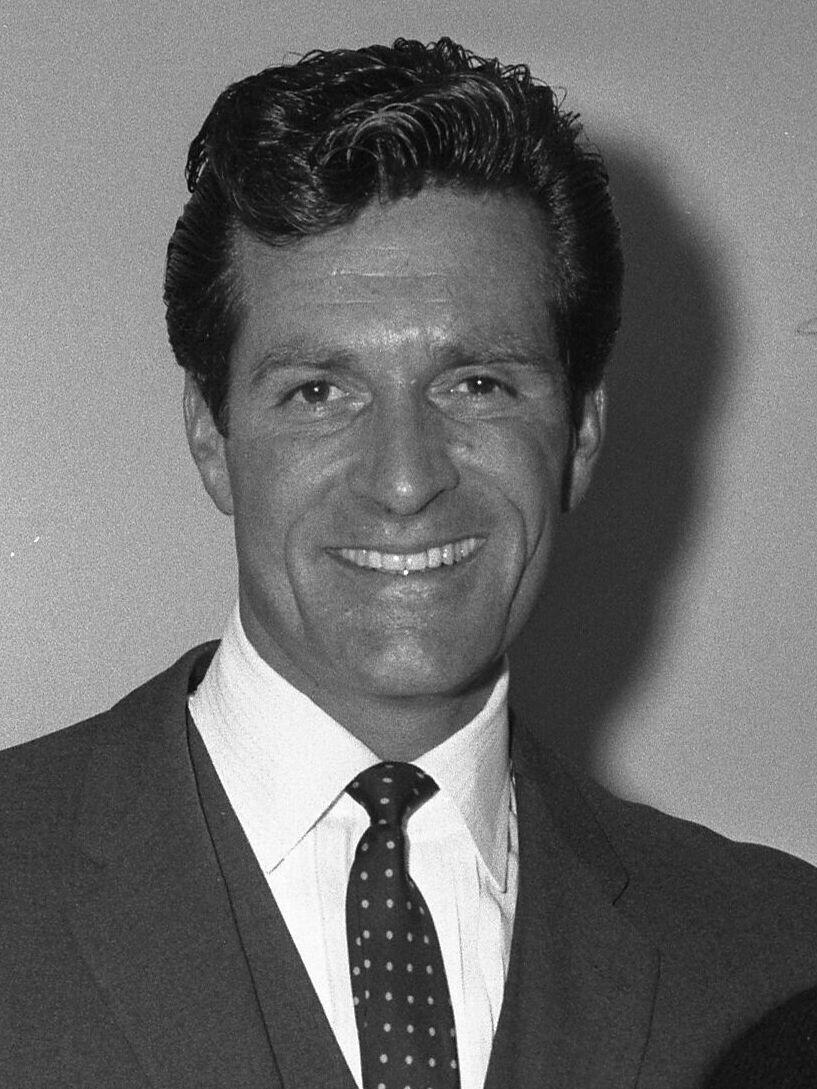
- O'Brian in 1965
- Born: Hugh Charles Krampe; April 19, 1925; Rochester, New York, U.S.
- Died: September 5, 2016 (aged 91); Beverly Hills, California, U.S.
- Education: University of California
- Occupation: Actor
- Years active: 1948–2000
- Spouse: Virginia Barber (m. 2006)
- Military career
- Allegiance: United States
- Branch: United States Marine Corps
- Service years: 1943–1949
- Rank: Sergeant
- Website: hughobrian.me

Hugh O'Brian (born Hugh Charles Krampe; April 19, 1925 – September 5, 2016) was an American actor and humanitarian who starred in the ABC Western television series The Life and Legend of Wyatt Earp (1955–1961) and the NBC action television series Search (1972–1973). His films included an adaptation of Agatha Christie's Ten Little Indians (1965); he also had a supporting role in John Wayne's last film, The Shootist (1976).

In 1965, he created and endowed the “UCLA Hugh O’Brian Acting Awards,” which, for over 25 years awarded a small cash payment but more importantly an opportunity for promising talent in the UCLA School of Fine Arts-Theatre to attract agent representation. He created the Hugh O'Brian Youth Leadership Foundation, (HOBY) a nonprofit youth leadership-development program for high-school scholars. It has sponsored more than 500,000 students since O'Brian founded the program in 1958, following an extended visit with physician and theologian Albert Schweitzer.

== Life and career ==
=== Early life and military service ===
O'Brian was born Hugh Charles Krampe in Rochester, New York, the son of Hugh John Krampe, who served as an officer in the United States Marine Corps, and Edith Lillian (née Marks) Krampe. O'Brian once described his father as "one of the toughest men I ever knew"; this inspired his interest in the military.

O'Brian moved with his parents to Lancaster, Pennsylvania, around 1930, when he was about five years old. His father had become an executive with the Armstrong Cork Company, which was headquartered in Lancaster. The Krampe family lived at the Stevens House Hotel temporarily before moving to the newly developed School Lane Hills houses in the city's West End. O'Brian attended Lancaster city elementary schools. The Krampes resided in Lancaster for about four years before they moved to Chicago, where his father had another position with the Armstrong Cork Company. Years later, in 1963, Hugh O'Brian was awarded the key to the city by Lancaster Mayor George Coe.

After the move to the Chicago area, Krampe and his family lived in Winnetka, Illinois, where he attended New Trier High School. He transferred to the Kemper Military School (closed in 2002) in Boonville, Missouri, where he lettered in football, basketball, wrestling, and track.

After one semester at the University of Cincinnati, Krampe dropped out to enlist in the Marine Corps during World War II. At 17, he became the youngest Marine drill instructor on record.

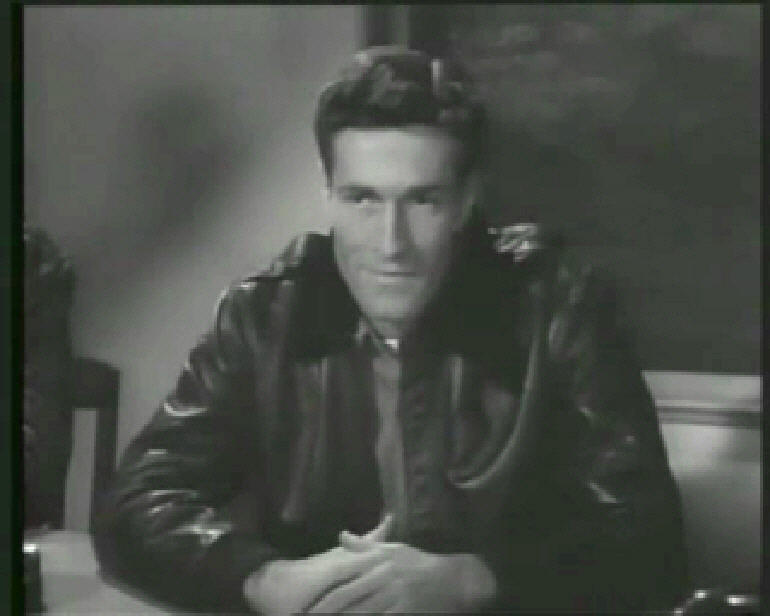
O'Brian as Harry Chamberlain in Rocketship X-M (1950)

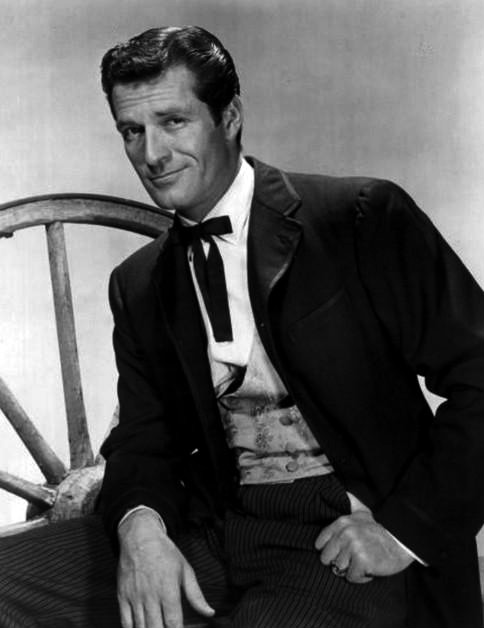
O'Brian alias Wyatt Earp in the ABC western anthology The Life and Legend of Wyatt Earp

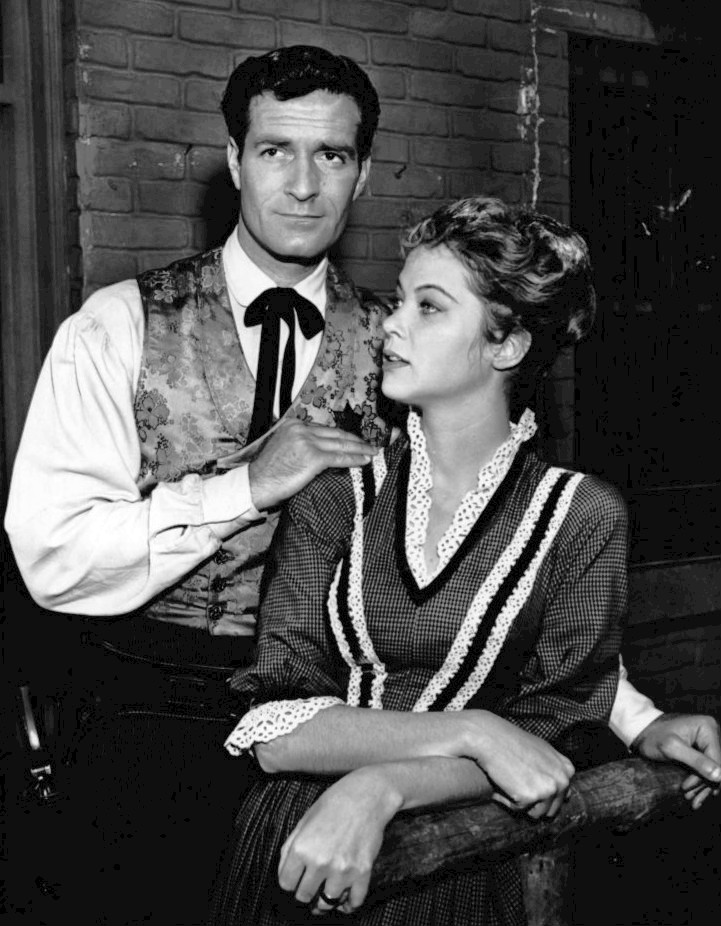
With Louise Fletcher (1959)

=== Career start and name change ===
After World War II ended, Krampe planned to become a lawyer and had been accepted at Yale University for the fall of 1947. Before that, he lived in Hollywood, where he was dating an actress. He attended her rehearsals of the Somerset Maugham play Home and Beauty. When the lead actor failed to show up, director Ida Lupino asked him to read the lines. He got the role and the play received a tremendous review, then received a contract offer from an agent.

Krampe changed his name after the program incorrectly listed him as "Hugh Krape". He later said, "I decided right then I didn't want to go through life being known as Huge Krape, so I decided to take my mother's family name, O'Brien, but they misspelled it as 'O'Brian' and I just decided to stay with that."

Lupino signed him to Never Fear, a film she was directing. O'Brian gained a contract with Universal Pictures.

=== Wyatt Earp and television career ===
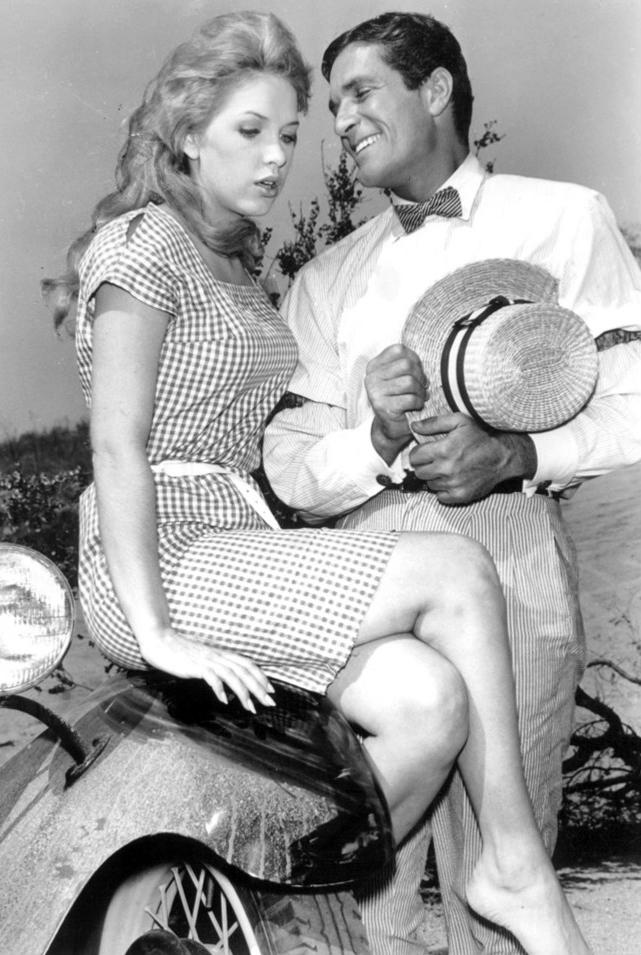
Stella Stevens and O'Brian, General Electric Theater, 1961

He was chosen to portray legendary lawman Wyatt Earp on the ABC Western series The Life and Legend of Wyatt Earp, which debuted in 1955. To help develop his character, O'Brian bought Stuart N. Lake's book Wyatt Earp: Frontier Marshal. He also developed a relationship with Lake, who was a consultant on the show for the first two years. The series, alongside Gunsmoke and Cheyenne, which debuted the same year, spearheaded the "adult Western" television genre, with the emphasis on character development rather than moral sermonizing. It soon became one of the top-rated shows on television. During its six-year run, Wyatt Earp consistently placed in the top 10 in the United States. Decades later, he reprised the role in two episodes of the television series Guns of Paradise (1990), the television movie The Gambler Returns: The Luck of the Draw (1991), and the independent film Wyatt Earp: Return to Tombstone (1994), the latter mixing new footage and colorized archival sequences from the original series.

O'Brian appeared regularly on other programs in the 1950s and 1960s, including The Nat King Cole Show, The Jackie Gleason Show, The Ed Sullivan Show, and The Dinah Shore Chevy Show, all in 1957. He was seen in Jack Palance's ABC circus drama The Greatest Show on Earth. He starred in The Alfred Hitchcock Hour episode "Ride the Nightmare" in 1962. He also appeared as a 'guest attorney' in the 1963 Perry Mason episode "The Case of the Two-Faced Turn-a-bout" when its star, Raymond Burr, was sidelined for a spell after minor emergency surgery. He served as guest host on episodes of The Hollywood Palace in 1964 and the rock music series Shindig! in 1965. He was a guest celebrity panelist on the CBS primetime programs Password and What's My Line? and served as a mystery guest on three occasions on the latter series.

In 1971, he filmed a television pilot titled Probe, playing a high-tech (for the times) agent for a company that specialized in recovering valuable items. The pilot spawned a series for O'Brian named Search, which ran one season (1972–1973). In 1999 and 2000, he co-starred with Dick Van Patten, Deborah Winters, Richard Roundtree, and Richard Anderson in the miniseries Y2K - World in Crisis.

=== Film career ===
The actor appeared in a number of films, among them Rocketship X-M (1950), The Lawless Breed (1953), There's No Business Like Show Business (1954), White Feather (1955), The Brass Legend (1956), Come Fly with Me (1963), Love Has Many Faces (1965), In Harm's Way (1965), Ten Little Indians (1965), and Ambush Bay (1966).

While onstage, Elvis Presley introduced O'Brian from the audience at a performance at the Las Vegas Hilton, as captured in the imported live CD release "April Fool's Dinner". O'Brian was a featured actor in the 1977 two-hour premiere of the television series Fantasy Island. He played the last character whom John Wayne ever killed on the screen in Wayne's final movie, The Shootist (1976). O'Brian appeared in fight scenes with a Bruce Lee lookalike in Lee's last – partially completed – film, the controversial Game of Death. O'Brian recreated his Wyatt Earp role for three 1990s projects: Guns of Paradise (1990) and The Gambler Returns: The Luck of the Draw (1991), with fellow actor Gene Barry doing likewise as lawman Bat Masterson for each, as well as the independent film Wyatt Earp: Return to Tombstone (1994). He also had a cameo as the father of Danny DeVito and Arnold Schwarzenegger in the comedy Twins (1988).

O'Brian also appeared in one episode of Murder, She Wrote (1990), one episode of L.A. Law (1993) and two episodes of Call of the Wild (2000).

== Hugh O'Brian Youth Leadership Foundation ==
O'Brian dedicated much of his life to the Hugh O'Brian Youth Leadership Foundation (HOBY), a non-profit youth leadership-development program for high-school scholars. HOBY sponsors 10,000 high school sophomores annually through its over 70 leadership programs in all 50 states and 20 countries. Since its inception in 1958, over 500,000 young people have participated in HOBY-related programs.

One high-school sophomore from every high school in the United States, referred to as an "ambassador", is welcome to attend a state or regional HOBY seminar. From each of those seminars, students (number based on population) are offered the opportunity to attend the World Leadership Congress. In 2008, over 500 ambassadors attended from all 50 states and 20 countries. The concept for HOBY was inspired in 1958 by a nine-day visit O'Brian had with famed humanitarian Dr. Albert Schweitzer in Africa. Dr. Schweitzer believed "the most important thing in education is to teach young people to think for themselves."

O'Brian's message was explained in an essay on the topic:

I do NOT believe we are all born equal. Created equal in the eyes of God, yes, but physical and emotional differences, parental guidelines, varying environments, being in the right place at the right time, all play a role in enhancing or limiting an individual's development. But I DO believe every man and woman, if given the opportunity and encouragement to recognize their potential, regardless of background, has the freedom to choose in our world. Will an individual be a taker or a giver in life? Will that person be satisfied merely to exist or seek a meaningful purpose? Will he or she dare to dream the impossible dream? I believe every person is created as the steward of his or her own destiny with great power for a specific purpose, to share with others, through service, a reverence for life in a spirit of love.

— Hugh O'Brian, The Freedom to Choose.

== Personal life and death ==
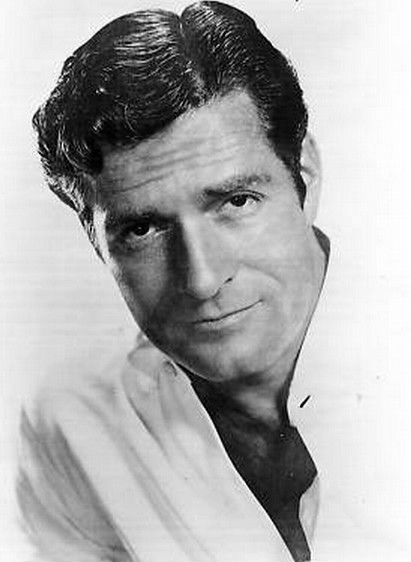
O'Brian in 1964

In 1969, photographer Adina Etkis successfully sued O'Brian for child support in Los Angeles court regarding her son Hugh Donald Krampe. Etkis had met O'Brian in 1951. However, O'Brian stated in his trust: "I do not have any children, living or dead", specifically naming two claimants, including Hugh. Four people have claimed O'Brian to be their father.

On June 25, 2006, at age 81, O'Brian married his girlfriend of 18 years, Virginia Barber (born circa 1952); it was his first and only marriage, with Rev. Robert Schuller officiating. The ceremony was held at Forest Lawn Memorial Park, which is where he was laid to rest. Barber, a teacher by profession, had been previously married once. The couple spent their honeymoon studying philosophy at Oxford University. O'Brian stated that he believed "an active mind is as important as an active body". O'Brian died at his home in Beverly Hills, California, on September 5, 2016, at age 91.

== Awards ==
For his contribution to the television industry, Hugh O'Brian has a star on the Hollywood Walk of Fame at 6613½ Hollywood Blvd. In 1992, he was inducted into the Western Performers Hall of Fame at the National Cowboy & Western Heritage Museum in Oklahoma City, Oklahoma.

Year	Nominated work	Award	Result
1953	The Man from the Alamo	Golden Globe for Most Promising Newcomer — Male	Won
1956	The Life and Legend of Wyatt Earp	Primetime Emmy for Best Continuing Performance by an Actor in a Dramatic Series	Nominated
1960	Himself	Hollywood Walk of Fame Star — Television	Honored
1973	Himself	American Academy of Achievement’s Golden Plate Award	Honored
1991	Himself	Golden Boot Award	Honored
1992	Himself	Hall of Great Western Performers	Inducted
