= Desire Under the Elms (film) =

1958 film by Delbert Mann

- Directed by: Delbert Mann
- Written by: Eugene O'Neill; Irwin Shaw
- Produced by: Don Hartman
- Starring: Sophia Loren
- Cinematography: Daniel L. Fapp
- Edited by: George Boemler
- Music by: Elmer Bernstein
- Production company: Don Hartman Productions
- Distributed by: Paramount Pictures
- Release date: March 12, 1958
- Running time: 111 minutes
- Country: United States
- Language: English
- Box office: $1 million (domestic rentals)

Desire Under the Elms is a 1958 American film version of the 1924 play Desire Under the Elms written by Eugene O'Neill. The film was directed by Delbert Mann from a screenplay by O'Neill and Irwin Shaw. The cast included Sophia Loren as Abbie (known as Anna in the film), Anthony Perkins as Eben, Burl Ives as Ephraim, Frank Overton as Simeon, and Pernell Roberts as Peter. The film was nominated for Best Black and White Cinematography (Daniel L. Fapp) at the Academy Awards and Laurel Awards in 1959. It was also entered into the 1958 Cannes Film Festival.

== Plot ==
Widower Ephraim Cabot, a greedy New England farmer who has overworked two wives to their graves, works his three sons from the two women as slaves. The farm's land originally belonged to the second wife, and before her death she pleads with Eben, the youngest son, to take the farm from the old man as his birthright. Eben buys out his half-brothers' shares of the farm with money stolen from his father, and Peter and Simeon head off to California to seek their fortune. Ephraim announces that his desire is for the farm not to be left to anyone, but rather burned to the ground on his death. Later, Ephraim returns with a new wife, Anna, a beautiful and headstrong woman from Italy, who enters into an adulterous affair with Eben. Soon after, Anna bears Eben's child, but lets Ephraim believe that the child is his, with the old man's assurance that the farm shall be willed to her. The proud Ephraim is oblivious to his neighbours' open mocking of him as a cuckold. Eben and Anna argue and, in a fit of jealousy because of comments from his father, Eben tells Anna he wishes the baby were dead and desires to never see Anna again. Madly in love with Eben and fearful of losing him because of the argument, Anna kills the infant, thinking this will prove to Eben her commitment to him. However, an angry and distraught Eben threatens to tell the sheriff what she has done and departs. Before the sheriff arrives Eben returns to the farm and admits to Anna the depths of his love for her and confesses his own role in the infanticide. The old man condemns them both, calls out God, and is content that the farm will not fall into anyone's hands. The sheriff comments to his deputy that he wishes he could possess such a special farm as Ephraim's and then takes the two lovers to jail.

== Cast ==
- Sophia Loren as Anna Cabot
- Anthony Perkins as Eben Cabot
- Burl Ives as Ephraim Cabot
- Frank Overton as Simeon Cabot
- Pernell Roberts as Peter Cabot
- Rebecca Welles as Lucinda Cabot (as Rebecca Wells)
- Jean Willes as Florence Cabot
- Anne Seymour as Eben's mother
- Roy Fant as Fiddler

== Production ==
Don Hartman acquired the story for Paramount Pictures and took it over when he left Paramount to become an independent producer. He died shortly after its release.

== Reception ==
The film was panned by critics. Bosley Crowther of The New York Times blamed Ives's weak portrayal of Ephraim for causing "the whole ambitious project to fall flat":

Burl Ives is wrong for the role. In the first place, he's fat and flabby, not hard and sinewy. He looks more like Foxy Grandpa with a pious black hat on his head than like a gaunt and tireless old toiler with limbs resembling those of an ageless elm. What's more, he plays Ephraim Cabot in a heavy, shuffling way and speaks his taunts and fulminations pretty much in a stagey monotone. He lacks the air of slow destruction that should go with the cold New England hills. He is not very much of a menace. He is the mortal weakness in the film.

== Honors ==
- Best Cinematography-Black & White Academy Award (Daniel L. Fapp) - nominated
- Palme d'Or, Cannes Film Festival - nominated
- Best Cinematography-Black & White, Laurel Awards (Daniel L. Fapp) - nominated

== See also ==
- List of American films of 1958
