= Juvenile Jungle (film) =

1958 film by William Witney

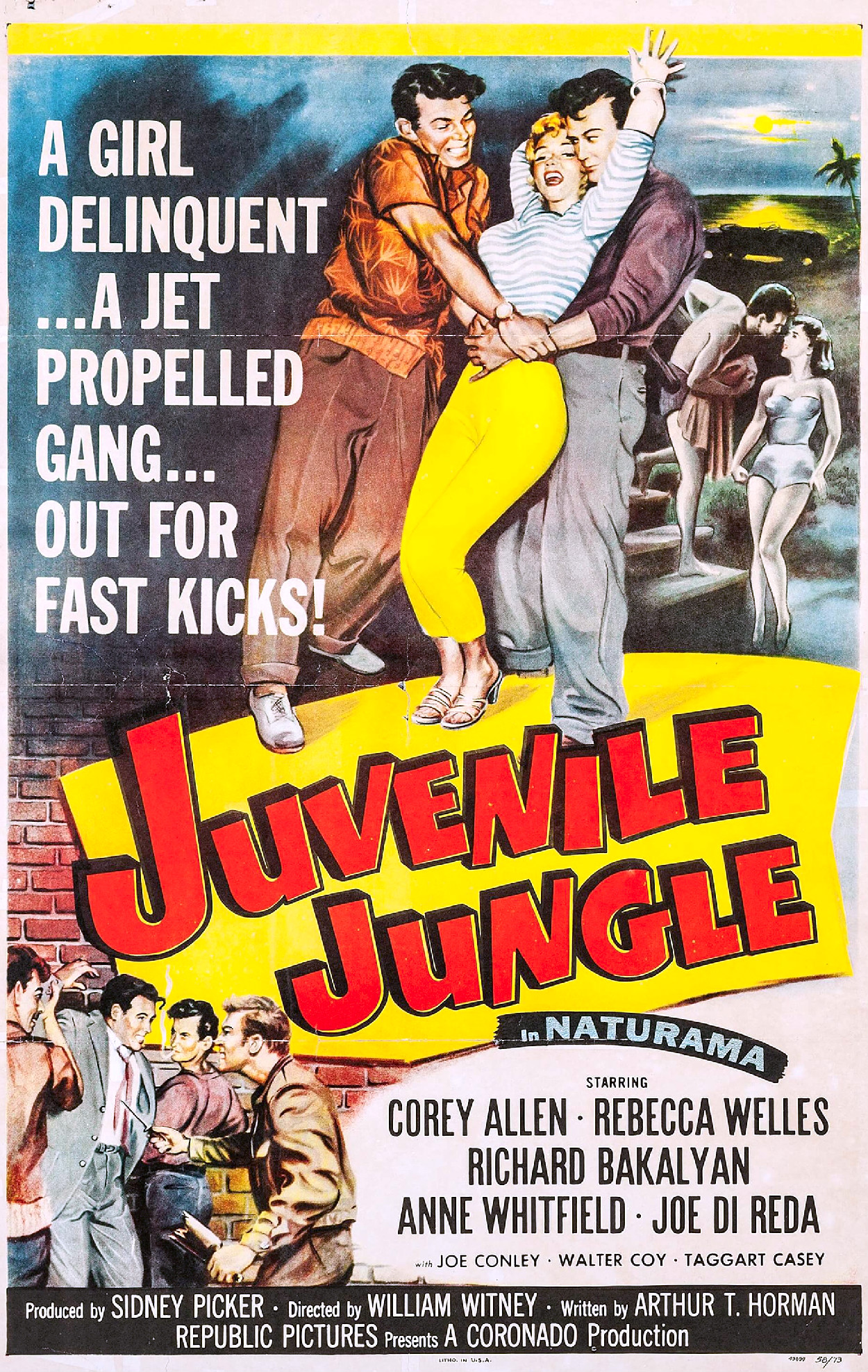
- Theatrical release poster
- Directed by: William Witney
- Screenplay by: Arthur T. Horman
- Produced by: Sidney Picker
- Starring: Corey Allen; Rebecca Welles; Richard Bakalyan; Anne Whitfield; Joe Di Reda; Joe Conley
- Cinematography: Jack A. Marta
- Edited by: Joseph Harrison
- Production company: Coronado Pictures Inc.
- Distributed by: Republic Pictures
- Release date: April 24, 1958
- Running time: 69 minutes
- Country: United States
- Language: English

Juvenile Jungle is a 1958 American crime film directed by William Witney and written by Arthur T. Horman. The film stars Corey Allen, Rebecca Welles, Richard Bakalyan, Anne Whitfield, Joe Di Reda and Joe Conley. The film was released on April 24, 1958 by Republic Pictures.

== Plot ==
Hal McQueen, a young unsuccessful debt collector, lures a gang of delinquents into a kidnap-for-ransom plot. The gang consists of tough-guy Monte and a waitress named Glory. There's also the wisecracking Tic Tac and his best bud Duke, who works at a liquor store. Besides selling booze, the store also cashes paychecks. This means that every Friday afternoon, the store has lots of money on hand. Duke's boss, the owner of the liquor store, is Mr. Elliot. Hal proposes that the gang target Mr. Elliot's teenaged daughter, Carolyn. The plan calls for the good-looking Hal to meet and date Carolyn steadily so that he can gain her trust. Then, while Hal and Carolyn spend a long Friday afternoon at the beach, the gang can execute the rest of the plan, demanding and collecting a sizable ransom from Carolyn's dad before she returns safely from the beach with Hal. As the gang reasons, they will profit off of a kidnapping that isn't really a kidnapping.

However, the plan goes awry; Hal unexpectedly falls in love with Carolyn. To clear his conscience, he goes to the Elliot home on the Friday the score is to take place. Hal informs Carolyn of the plot, telling her he's leaving town. Carolyn reciprocates Hal's feelings by begging him not to go. Their meeting is suddenly interrupted by the arrival of Monte and Glory. While Monte holds a gun on the couple, Glory telephones Mr. Elliot at the store. She tells him they've kidnapped his daughter. She then orders Elliot to put a large bundle of cash into a valise and leave it in the front seat of his unlocked car. Mr. Elliot does what he's told. Seconds later from nearby, Tic Tac and Duke get into the car and drive the loot to their planned rendezvous with Monte and Glory. But police are soon notified and waiting to pounce.

As Tic Tac and Duke arrive at the Elliot home with the ransom money, a confrontation ensues with police. Inside the house, Monte threatens Carolyn and then fires multiple shots into Hal. When the standoff finally ends, the gang members are arrested, and the seriously wounded Hal is loaded into an ambulance. After briefly hugging her father, Carolyn rides with an unconscious Hal to the hospital, wondering if he will survive.

== Cast ==
- Corey Allen as Hal McQueen
- Rebecca Welles as Glory
- Richard Bakalyan as Tic-Tac
- Anne Whitfield as Carolyn Elliot
- Joe Di Reda as Monte
- Joe Conley as Duke
- Walter Coy as John Elliot
- Taggart Casey as Lt. Milford
- Hugh Lawrence as Officer Ed Ellis
- Leon Tyler as Ballpark usher
- Harvey Grant as Pete
- Louise Arthur as Mrs. Elliot

== Critical reception ==
Writing in AllMovie, critic Hal Erickson described the film as "suspiciously like a standard kidnap drama, rewritten to conform with the 'juvenile delinquent' cycle of the late 1950s," and noted that director "William Witney struggles manfully to inject some excitement into the plodding plotline." A review of the film at Nostalgia Central described it as a "typical ‘juvenile delinquent’ film of the period featuring lots of moralising and melodramatic over-acting from 'teens' in their late 20s or early 30s," and noted that although the film "was clearly made on a shoestring budget [...] the story offers plenty of action, good direction (William Witney is one of Quentin Tarantino’s favourite directors) and a solid pace."
