= Rebecca Welles =

American actress (1928–2017)

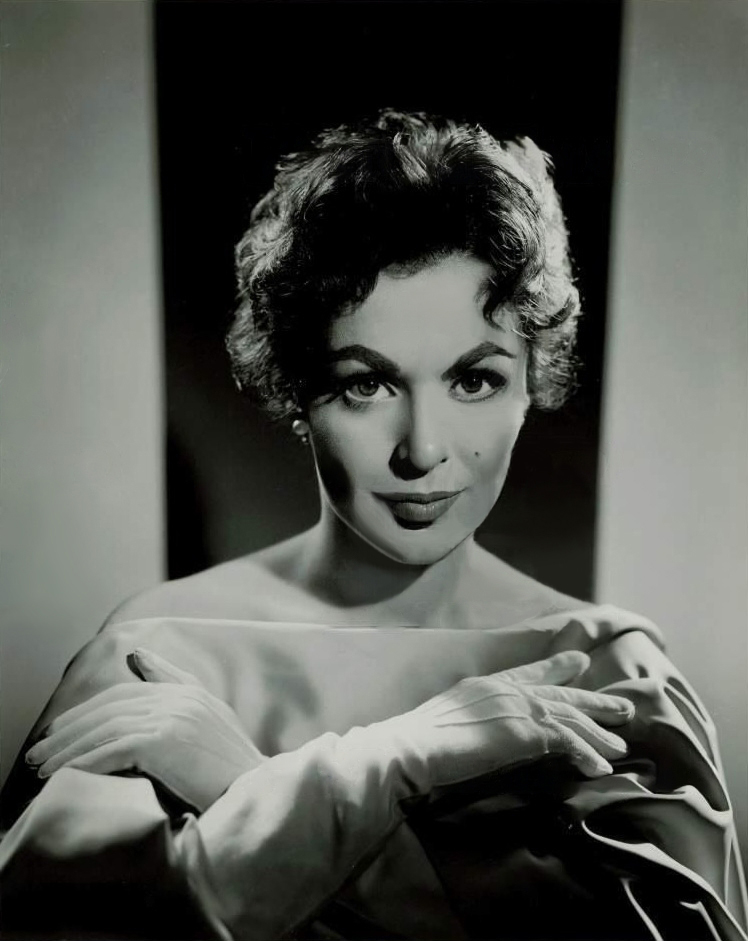
- Welles in 1957
- Born: Reba Tassell; February 5, 1928; Philadelphia, Pennsylvania, U.S.
- Died: February 13, 2017 (aged 89); Santa Fe, New Mexico, U.S.
- Education: American Academy of Dramatic Arts
- Occupation: Actress
- Years active: 1951–1964
- Known for: Desire Under the Elms; Perry Mason; Juvenile Jungle
- Spouses: Barton Goldberg (m. 1946; div. 1961) Don Weis (m. 1961; died 2000)
- Children: 2, including Gwen Welles
- Relatives: Gustave Tassell (brother)

Rebecca Welles (born Reba Tassell; February 5, 1928 – February 13, 2017) was an American television and film actress.

== Early years ==
Welles's sibling was fashion designer Gustave Tassell. In 1944, she was the recipient of a $500 tuition award from the Theatre Guild to the American Academy of Dramatic Arts. She spent two years at the academy while acting in stock theater in Philadelphia.

As a youngster, she was a member of the Bessie V. Hicks Players in Philadelphia.

== Career ==
Welles' first TV appearance was in the episode "A Chill on the Wind" on Studio One in 1951, where she was credited under her birth name, but subsequently worked under the surname Welles. (A newspaper source in February 1951 says of Welles, "Last November she had a walk-on in the Studio One drama of A Letter to Cairo.)

Active from 1951 to 1964, Welles made appearances on about 50 TV shows, including 77 Sunset Strip, Gunsmoke (S2E33 “Moon”), Boots and Saddles, Bat Masterson, Alcoa Theatre, and four episodes of Alfred Hitchcock Presents. She made five appearances on Perry Mason, including three roles as defendants: in 1959 she played Carol Delaney in "The Case of the Stuttering Bishop", and Carol Taylor in "The Case of the Frantic Flyer". She played Rita Norge in the 1957 episode "The Case of the Runaway Corpse". In her other two appearances, she played the role of murderer Edith Bristol in the 1961 episode "The Case of the Waylaid Wolf" and murderer Leslie Eden in the 1964 episode "The Case of the Illicit Illusion". In addition, Welles appeared in four feature films, including Good Morning, Miss Dove (1955) and Desire Under the Elms (1958). She made her last onscreen appearance in a 1964 episode of Arrest and Trial.

Welles was the inspiration for an episode of Big Town on CBS. A newspaper article in The Bridgeport Telegram on February 21, 1951, reported "Susan Douglas stars as Miss Cinderella ... which was inspired by the experience of Reba Tassell, the TV Cinderella girl who made such a hit on Studio One last month."

== Personal life ==
Welles married Barton Goldberg in 1946. They had two daughters together, Elizabeth and actress Gwen Welles, before they divorced in 1961. Welles married television director Don Weis on August 25, 1961, in Los Angeles.

== Filmography ==
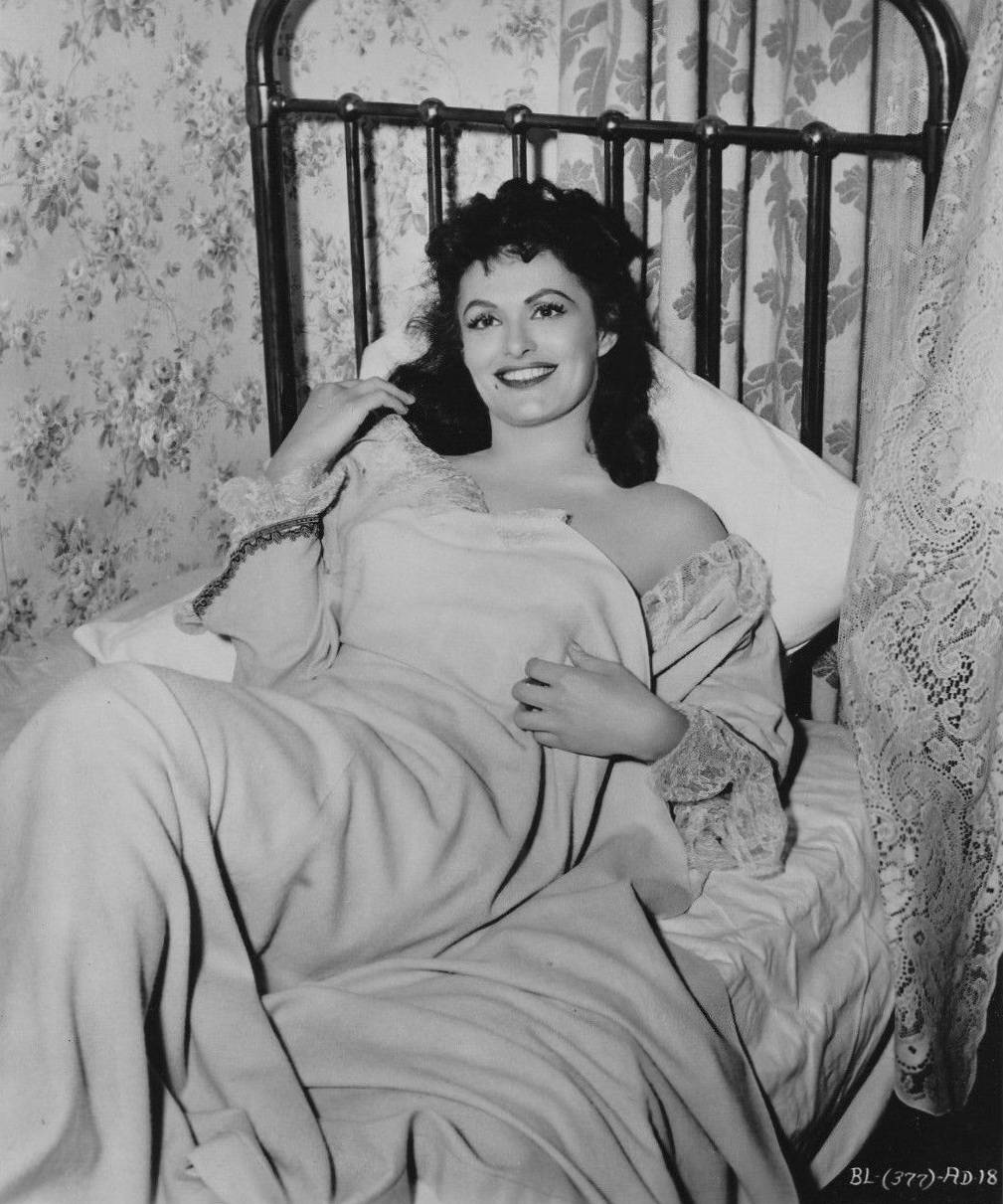
Welles in The Brass Legend (1956)

Film
Year	Film	Role	Notes
1955	Good Morning, Miss Dove	Polly Burnham	Uncredited
1956	The Brass Legend	Millie Street	Credited as Reba Tassell
1958	Desire Under the Elms	Lucinda Cabot	
1958	Juvenile Jungle	Glory	
Television
Year	Title	Role	Notes
1951	Studio One		1 episode
1951	Lights Out		1 episode
1951	The Web		1 episode
1953	Danger		1 episode
1953	Harvest	Arlene	Television movie Credited as Reba Tassell
1953	Robert Montgomery Presents	Arlene	1 episode
1956–1960	Alfred Hitchcock Presents	Various roles	Season 1 Episode 32: "The Baby Sitter" (1956) as Jane 'Janie' Slocum (credited as Reba Tassel) Season 2 Episode 33: "A Man Greatly Beloved" (1957) as Mrs. Fell Season 2 Episode 37: "The Indestructible Mr. Weems" (1957) as Laura Weems Season 5 Episode 18: "Backward, Turn Backward" (1960) as Betty Murray
1957	Wire Service	Julia Thomas	1 episode
1957	Gunsmoke	Nan Mellors	1 episode
1957	The Web		1 episode
1957	Boots and Saddles	Laurie	2 episodes
1957	The Millionaire	Amy	1 episode
1957–1964	Perry Mason	Various roles	5 episodes
1958	Mickey Spillane's Mike Hammer	Sandra Mantell	1 episode
1958	State Trooper	Betty Dolan	1 episode
1958	Trackdown	Julie Corbin	1 episode
1958	M Squad	Mrs. Kenneth Darrell	1 episode
1958	Northwest Passage	Maureen Carver	1 episode
1958	Frontier Doctor	Maria Belotti, Circus Owner	1 episode
1958	26 Men	Ruth	1 episode
1958	Rescue 8	Madge	1 episode
1958	The Lineup	Jane Abbott	1 episode
1959	The Thin Man	Maria	1 episode
1959	Wagon Train	Jean Yates	1 episode
1959	Zorro	Moneta	1 episode
1959	Bat Masterson	Isabel Fowler	1 episode
1959	The Californians	Cora Sue Sommers; Clara Keel	2 episodes
1959	Bronco	Lynne Henderson	1 episode
1959	The Lawless Years	Jane Cooper; Mary Drew	2 episodes
1960	Philip Marlowe	Julie French	1 episode
1960	Alcoa Theatre	Phoebe Hanes	1 episode
1960	Tightrope	Margo	1 episode
1960	The Dennis O'Keefe Show	Paula Hamilton	1 episode
1960	The Man from Blackhawk	Janet	1 episode
1960	Alcoa Presents: One Step Beyond	Adelle Bernheim	1 episode
1960	The Brothers Brannagan	Sally Ross	1 episode
1960	General Electric Theater		1 episode
1961	Checkmate	Fay Razon	1 episode
1961	The Case of the Dangerous Robin		1 episode
1961	The Untouchables	Rose Raineri	1 episode
1961	The DuPont Show with June Allyson	Polly	1 episode
1961	Hawaiian Eye	Vera Ormsby	1 episode
1961	77 Sunset Strip	Ellen Martone	1 episode
1962	The New Breed		1 episode
1962	Follow the Sun	Beverly Willis	1 episode
1963	Burke's Law	Susan Rivers	1 episode
1964	Arrest and Trial	Reba Thayer	1 episode
