= Joe Conley =

American actor (1928–2013)

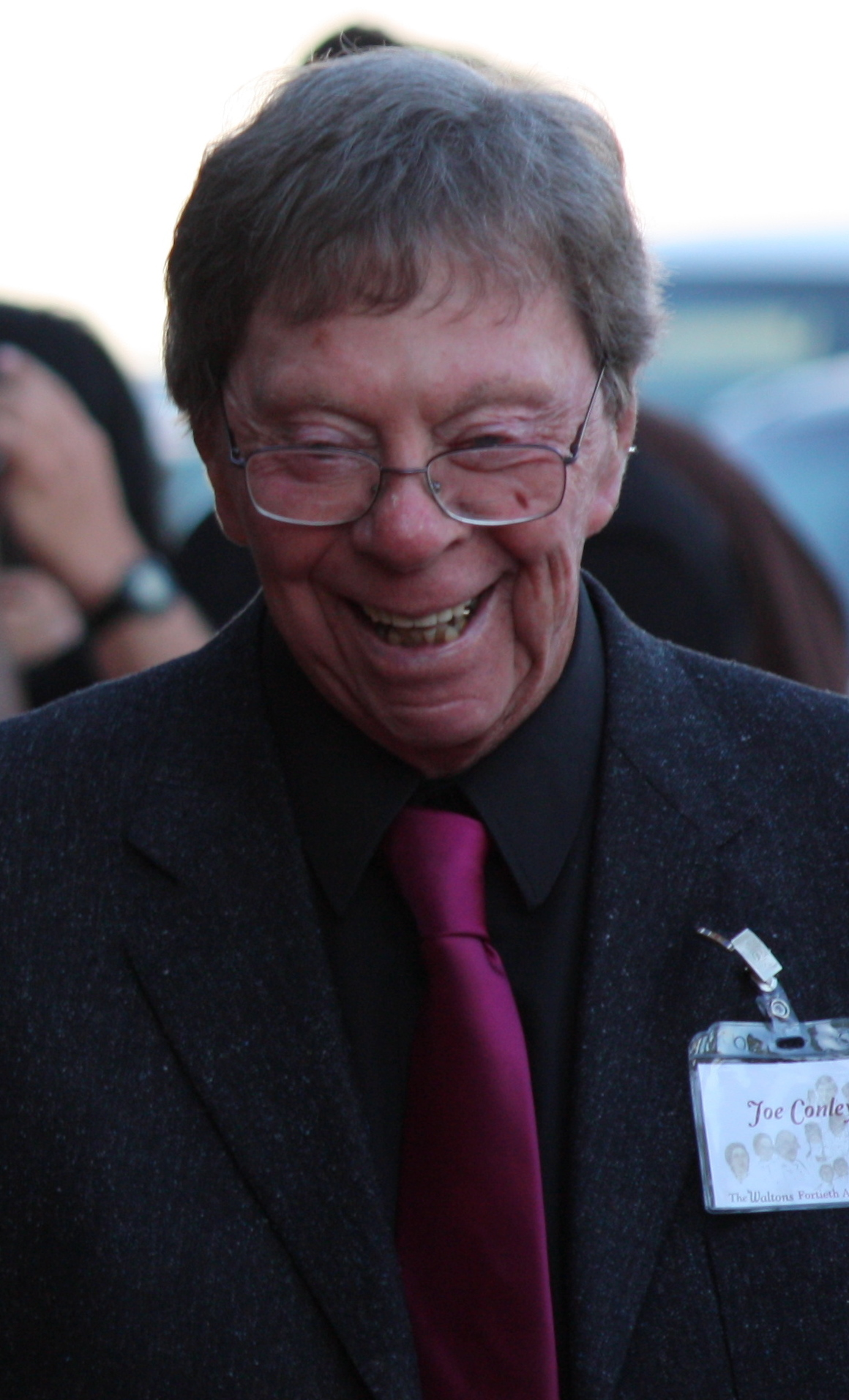
- Conley at The Waltons 40th Anniversary in 2012
- Born: March 3, 1928; Buffalo, New York, U.S.
- Died: July 7, 2013 (aged 85); Newbury Park, California, U.S.
- Occupation: Actor
- Years active: 1950–2002
- Spouse(s): Jacqueline Stakes (about 1962); Louise Ann Teechen (1969 – 2013; his death)
- Children: Kevin (b. 1960); Julie (b. 1961); Erin Elizabeth (b. 1971); Jana Lynne (b. 1974)

Joe Conley (March 3, 1928 – July 7, 2013) was an American actor who played many small roles on television and is most remembered for his role as the storekeeper Ike Godsey in The Waltons.

== Personal life and career ==
Joe Conley was born in Buffalo, New York. He started acting after returning from military service in Korea, and was running three real-estate agencies in the San Fernando Valley area of Los Angeles by the early 1970s after beginning this second career in 1961. While acting, he continued to work in real estate and, as a result, became wealthy.

By the early 1970s, his career as an actor was in limbo. After twenty years of small parts, mainly in television shows, he performed with Pat Harrington in an AT&T educational film called How to Lose Your Best Customer Without Really Trying. Before long, he was cast as storekeeper Ike Godsey in The Waltons. Conley was paired with Ronnie Claire Edwards, who portrayed his wife Corabeth Walton Godsey; their characters married on the show in 1975. In 2009, Conley published his autobiography, Ike Godsey of Walton's Mountain.

In real life, Conley was married to and later divorced from Jacqueline Stakes, with whom he had two children. He married Louise Teechen in 1969, and had two children with her.

=== Death ===
Conley died on July 7, 2013, at a care facility in Newbury Park, California of complications from dementia. He was 85 and is survived by his wife, three daughters, and a son.

== Filmography ==
Filmography
Year	Title	Role	Notes
1950	The Sound of Fury	Man in Crowd	Uncredited
1955	Big Town	Albert Hayes	Episode: "Honest Cop"
1955	The People's Choice	Ernie	Episode: "Socks new Secretary"
1956	The Scarlet Hour	Car Salesman	Uncredited
1956	The Adventures of Jim Bowie	Raino Tante	Episode: "The Ghost of Jean Battoo"
1957	Crime of Passion	Deliveryman	
1957	Lassie	Deliveryman	Episode: "Lassie's Day"
1957	The Silent Service	Baker	Episode: "The Seahorse Story"
1957	House of Numbers	Convict	Uncredited
1957	Casey Jones	Conductor Addrel	Episode: "The Old Timer"
1957	The Danny Thomas Show, also known as Make Room For Daddy	Earl the Elevator Operator	Episode: "Honesty is the Best Policy"
1957-1959	Dragnet		Season 7 Episode 4: "The Big Yak"; Season 8 Episode 16: "The Big Malcolm"
1958	Alfred Hitchcock Presents	Insurance Agent	Season 3 Episode 27: "Disappearing Trick"
1958	Juvenile Jungle	Duke	
1958	Boots and Saddles	Private Spanner	Episode: "The Superstition"
1958	A Nice Little Bank That Should Be Robbed	Benjy	Uncredited
1958	When Hell Broke Loose	Rookie	Uncredited
1959	The D.A.'s Man	Smiley	Episode: "The Pushter's"
1959	Wanted: Dead or Alive	Henry Jackson	Episode: "The Hostage"
1959	M Squad	Jack Moreno	Episode: "Mama's Boy"
1959	Flight	Sergeant Pachek	Episode: "Chopper Four"
1959	Richard Diamond, Private Detective	Joe / Bartender	3 episodes
1960	Stagecoach West	Henry	Episode: "The Saga of Jeremy Boone"
1960	The Best of the Post	Elevator Boy	Episode: "The Little Terror"
1960	Death Valley Days	Alf	Episode: Devil's Bar
1960-1962	Dennis the Menace	Nelson / Open House Looker	2 episodes
1961	Blueprint for Robbery	Jock McGee	
1961	All Hands on Deck	Sailor	Uncredited
1962	Patty	Johnny	
1962	The Dick Powell Theater	Tom	Episode: "Special Assignment"
1963-1965	Mister Ed	TV Man / Sam Easterbrook / Joe / Frank / Photographer / Charley Grant	6 episodes
1964	Kraft Suspense Theater	Dom	Episode: "Charlie, He Couldn't Kill a Fly"
1964	Gunsmoke	Carl (Stagecoach Driver)	Episode: "Help me Kitty"
1966	Green Acres	Heston Haney	Episode: "The Deputy"
1967	The Beverly Hillbillies	Sergeant	Episode: "The Army Game"
1967	Felony Squad	Cabbie	Episode: "Time of Trial"
1969	80 Steps to Jonah	Jenkins	
1969-1970	Bracken's World	Alvin Sloane / Art Director	2 episodes
1970	The Brady Bunch	Delivery Man	Episode: "The Hero"
1971	How to Lose Your Best Customer Without Really Trying	Charlie	
1972-1981	The Waltons	Ike Godsey	172 episodes
1972	The Longest Night	Salesman	TV movie
1982	A Day for Thanks on Walton's Mountain	Ike Godsey	TV movie
1982	Mother's Day on Walton's Mountain	Ike Godsey	TV movie
1982	A Wedding on Walton's Mountain	Ike Godsey	TV movie
1983	Knight Rider	Manager	Episode: "Short Notice"
1986	Impure Thoughts	Father Minnelli	
1993	A Walton Thanksgiving Reunion	Ike Godsey	TV movie
1995	A Walton Wedding	Ike Godsey	TV movie
1996	Night Stand with Dick Dietrick	Claude	Episode: "Dick Goes Home"
1999	Whatever it Takes	Frank	
2000	Cast Away	Joe Wally	
2001	Blind Obsession		(final film role)

== Bibliography ==
- Zoobilee Zoo (1986)
- Ike Godsey of Walton's Mountain. Albany: BearManor Media, 2010. ISBN 978-1-59393-508-5.
