= Gustave Tassell =

American fashion designer (1926–2014)

- Born: February 4, 1926; Philadelphia, Pennsylvania, US
- Died: June 9, 2014 (aged 88); Los Angeles, California, US
- Education: Pennsylvania Academy of Fine Arts
- Label: House of Norell, Gustave Tassell
- Awards: International Silk Association award (1959), Coty Award (1961), Cotton Council Fashion award (1963)

Gustave Tassell (February 4, 1926 – June 9, 2014) was an American fashion designer and Coty Award winner.

== Early life and career ==
Tassell was born on February 4, 1926, in Philadelphia, Pennsylvania to Lena (née Schiller; 1901–1973) and Samuel Tassell (1896–1963). He took a job in the advertising and display department for Hattie Carnegie, a pioneer in the fashion design world who was well known for both custom-made and high-end ready-to-wear clothes.

== Style ==
Tassell's design sensibility changed little from the 20th to the 21st century—he sought to create forward-looking fashion appropriate for elegant, confident women. He envisioned designs in natural fibers able to serve many purposes, with changing silhouette according to how the garment was buttoned, seamed, or tucked. Tassell aimed to produce affordable clothing with a sense of proportion, grace, and design.

== Death ==
According to Tassell's sister, actress Rebecca Welles, Tassell succumbed to complications from Alzheimer's disease in Los Angeles on June 9, 2014.
