= The Brass Legend =

1956 film by Gerd Oswald

- Theatrical release poster
- Directed by: Gerd Oswald
- Screenplay by: Don Martin
- Story by: Jess Arnold; George Zuckerman
- Produced by: Herman Cohen
- Starring: Hugh O'Brian; Nancy Gates; Raymond Burr; Rebecca Welles; Donald MacDonald; Robert Burton
- Cinematography: Charles Van Enger
- Edited by: Marjorie Fowler
- Music by: Paul Dunlap
- Production company: Robert Goldstein Productions
- Distributed by: United Artists
- Release date: December 12, 1956
- Running time: 79 minutes
- Country: United States
- Language: English

The Brass Legend is a 1956 American Western film directed by Gerd Oswald and written by Don Martin. The film stars Hugh O'Brian, Nancy Gates, Raymond Burr, Rebecca Welles, Donald MacDonald and Robert Burton. The film was released on December 12, 1956, by United Artists.

== Plot ==
Wanted outlaw Tris Hatten turns up in Apache Bend, looking for former sweetheart Millie Street, a saloon girl. Clay Gipson, the little brother of Sheriff Wade Addams' girlfriend, spots the fugitive and informs the sheriff, who knocks Hatten cold and takes him to jail.

Town opinion turns against the popular Wade, who is suspected by girlfriend Linda's father, rancher Tom Gipson, of being after a reward for Hatten that rightfully should go to the boy, Clay. In truth, Wade is trying to protect the child, particularly when the notorious Barlow gang rides into town to try to spring Hatten.

A reporter named Tatum helps damage the sheriff's reputation by revealing Clay to be the informant. Clay is wounded by a gunshot, bringing dad Tom to his senses. After shooting two of the Barlows, proving his courage, Wade must apprehend Hatten, who has had a gun smuggled to him in jail. Hatten shoots the reporter, but can't outdraw Wade.

== Cast ==
- Hugh O'Brian as Sheriff Wade Addams
- Nancy Gates as Linda Gipson
- Raymond Burr as Tris Hatten
- Rebecca Welles as Millie Street (billed as Reba Tassell)
- Donald MacDonald as Clay Gipson
- Robert Burton as Tom Gipson
- Eddie Firestone as Shorty
- Willard Sage as Jonathan Tatum
- Robert Griffin as Doc Ward
- Stacy Harris as George Barlow
- Dennis Cross as Carl Barlow
- Russell Simpson as Deputy 'Pop' Jackson
- Norman Leavitt as Deputy Cooper
- Vicente Padula as Sanchez
- Clegg Hoyt as Bartender
- Jack Farmer as Earl Barlow
- Michael Garrett as Deputy Charlie
- Charles Delaney as Deputy
- Paul Sorensen as Burly Apache Bend Townsman
- Sam Flint as Old Apache Bend Townsman
- Rick Warick as Deputy
