= Robert Burton (actor) =

American film and television actor

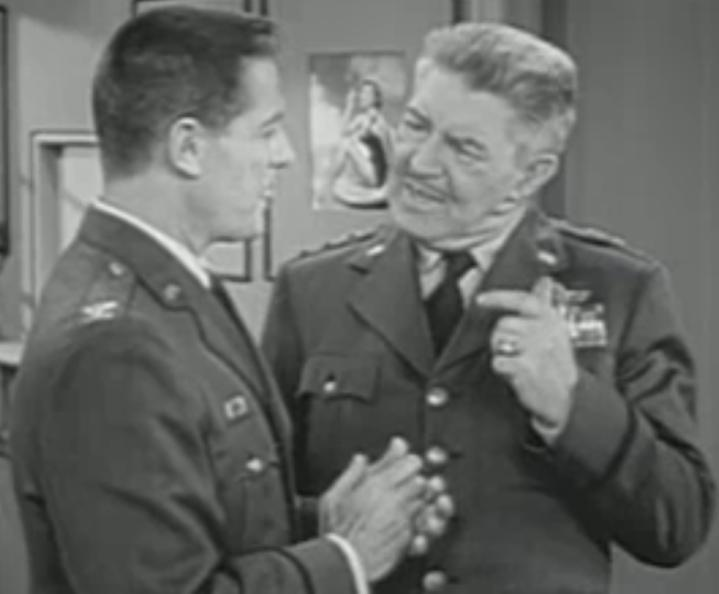
- Burton (right) with Robert Cummings in The Bob Cummings Show, 1958
- Born: Robert George Burton; August 13, 1895; Eastman, Georgia, U.S.
- Died: September 29, 1962 (aged 67); Woodland Hills, California, U.S.
- Occupations: Film and television actor
- Years active: 1952–1962

Robert George Burton (August 13, 1895 – September 29, 1962) was an American film and television actor. He appeared in over 100 films and television programs, and was best known for playing Tom Gipson in the 1956 film The Brass Legend.

Burton died on September 29, 1962 in Woodland Hills, California, at the age of 67.

== Partial filmography ==
- Fearless Fagan (1952) - Owen Gillman
- My Man and I (1952) - Sheriff
- Everything I Have Is Yours (1952) - Dr. Charles
- Desperate Search (1952) - Wayne Langmuir
- Sky Full of Moon (1952) - Customer
- The Bad and the Beautiful (1952) - McDill (uncredited)
- Above and Beyond (1952) - Brigadier General Samuel E. Roberts
- Confidentially Connie (1953) - Dr. Willis Shoop
- The Girl Who Had Everything (1953) - John Ashmond
- Code Two (1953) - Police Capt. Bill Williams
- Cry of the Hunted (1953) - Warden Keeley
- Fast Company (1953) - David Sandring
- A Slight Case of Larceny (1953) - Police Captain
- The Band Wagon (1953) - Caterer (uncredited)
- Latin Lovers (1953) - Mr. Cumberly
- Inferno (1953) - Sheriff
- The Big Heat (1953) - Gus Burke
- All the Brothers Were Valiant (1953) - Asa Worthen
- Taza, Son of Cochise (1954) - General George Crook
- Riot in Cell Block 11 (1954) - Guard Ambrose
- Siege at Red River (1954) - Sheriff
- Broken Lance (1954) - Mac Andrews
- Rogue Cop (1954) - Inspector Adrian Cassidy
- Hit the Deck (1955) - Commander (uncredited)
- A Man Called Peter (1955) - Mr. Peyton
- The Road to Denver (1955) - Pete
- Lay That Rifle Down (1955) - General Ballard
- The Last Command (1955) - Businessman in Cantina (uncredited)
- The Left Hand of God (1955) - Rev. Marvin (uncredited)
- Count Three and Pray (1955) - Bishop
- Jubal (1956) - Dr. Grant
- Reprisal! (1956) - Jeb Cantrell
- The Rack (1956) - Col. Ira Hansen
- Three Brave Men (1956) - W. L. Dietz
- The Brass Legend (1956) - Tom Gipson
- The Tall T (1957) - Tenvoorde
- Slander (1957) - Harry Walsh (uncredited)
- The Spirit of St. Louis (1957) - Maj. Albert Lambert (Lindbergh Sponsor) - (uncredited)
- The Hired Gun (1957) - Nathan Conroy
- Domino Kid (1957) - Sheriff Travers
- No Down Payment (1957) - Mr. Cagle (uncredited)
- I Was a Teenage Frankenstein (1957) - Dr. Karlton
- The Hard Man (1957) - Sheriff Hacker
- The Young Lions (1958) - Col. Mead (uncredited)
- Too Much, Too Soon (1958) - Bill Henning (uncredited)
- Perry Mason (1958) - Dr. W. Fremont
- Man or Gun (1958) - Deputy Sheriff Burt Burton
- Mardi Gras (1958) - Comdr. Tydings
- Compulsion (1959) - Charles Straus
- The 30 Foot Bride of Candy Rock (1959) - First General
- A Private's Affair (1959) - Gen. Charles E. Hargrave
- Space Invasion of Lapland (1959) - Dr. Frederick Wilson
- The Story on Page One (1959) - District Attorney Nordeau
- Wake Me When It's Over (1960) - Col. Dowling
- The Gallant Hours (1960) - Maj. Gen. Roy Geiger
- Seven Ways from Sundown (1960) - Eavens
- The Absent-Minded Professor (1961) - Sam Wheeler (uncredited)
- The Young Savages (1961) - Judge
- Ada (1961) - Committee Man (uncredited)
- Sweet Bird of Youth (1962) - Director (uncredited)
- Birdman of Alcatraz (1962) - Sen. Ham Lewis (uncredited)
- The Manchurian Candidate (1962) - Convention Chairman (uncredited)
- Billy Rose's Jumbo (1962) - Madison (released posthumously)
- The Slime People (1963) - Professor Galbraith (released posthumously; final film role)
