= Ambassador (musical) =

- From cast album cover
- Music: Don Gohman
- Lyrics: Hal Hackady
- Book: Don Ettlinger; Anna Marie Barlow
- Basis: Henry James novel The Ambassadors
- Productions: 1971 West End 1972 Broadway

Ambassador is a musical with a book by Don Ettlinger and Anna Marie Barlow, lyrics by Hal Hackady, and music by Don Gohman. It is based on the 1903 Henry James novel The Ambassadors.

== Synopsis ==
Lewis Lambert Strether experiences a clash of cultures when he journeys to 1906 Paris to find his fiancée's wayward son and bring him back to America to take his rightful place as heir to the family fortune. The strait-laced Strether's mission falls by the wayside when he finds the openness of the European lifestyle far more attractive than his stifling existence and comes to the realization the only rescue the young man requires is from the values of his manipulative mother.

== Production history ==
The show was first produced at Her Majesty's Theatre in London on October 19, 1971, and ran for 86 performances. The production was directed by Stone Widney, choreographed by Gillian Lynne, and starred Howard Keel as Lewis Lambert Strether, Danielle Darrieux as Marie de Vionnet, Margaret Courtenay as Amelia Newsome, Judith Paris as Sarah, and Blain Fairman as Bilham.

The show had its American premiere at Philadelphia's La Salle Music Theatre in June 1972 with no cast members from either the London or Broadway productions. The local cast had the benefit of the creators' input as they rewrote and revised for the production. In particular, several new opening scenes and numbers were tried out for what was then considered the plot problem: "get the boy to Paris". A couple of new numbers were tested for the show.

Despite the show's poor reception in London, the producers decided to bring it to Broadway. The show went through several re-writes which included cutting the first scene. The Broadway production, directed by Widney, conducted by Herbert Grossman and choreographed, because of Miss Lynne's unavailability, by Joyce Trisler, opened on November 19, 1972, at the Lunt-Fontanne Theatre, where it ran for 20 previews and 9 performances. The cast included Keel as Lewis, Darrieux as Marie, Michael J. Shannon as Chad, Andrea Marcovicci as Jeanne de Vionnet, M'el Dowd as Amelia Newsome, and Nicholas Dante as the bellboy.

== Song list ==
Act I

- Lambert's Quandary
- Lilas
- I Know the Man
- The Right Time, the Right Place
- She Passed My Way
- Something More
- Love Finds the Lonely
- Surprise
- Happy Man

Act II

- Lilas, What Happened to Paris
- Young with Him
- Too Much to Forgive
- Why Do Women Have to Call It Love
- Mama
- That's What I Need Tonight
- Gossip
- Not Tomorrow
- All of My Life
- Thank You, No
