= The Tattered Dress =

1957 film by Jack Arnold

- Film poster by Reynold Brown
- Directed by: Jack Arnold
- Written by: George Zuckerman
- Produced by: Albert Zugsmith
- Starring: Jeff Chandler; Jeanne Crain; Jack Carson; Gail Russell; Elaine Stewart
- Cinematography: Carl E. Guthrie
- Edited by: Edward Curtiss
- Music by: Frank Skinner
- Distributed by: Universal-International Pictures
- Release date: March 14, 1957
- Running time: 93 minutes
- Country: United States
- Language: English
- Box office: $1.43 million (US rentals)

The Tattered Dress is a 1957 American CinemaScope film noir crime drama released by Universal Pictures and directed by Jack Arnold, starring Jeff Chandler, Jeanne Crain, Jack Carson, Gail Russell and Elaine Stewart.

== Plot ==
Michael Reston, a wealthy man in a Californian resort, is angry with his wife Charleen, because her tattered dress betrays that she’s having an affair. He drags her into a convertible, forcing her to direct him to her lover Larry Bell, a bartender. Michael shoots Larry down on the sidewalk.

He hires James Gordon Blane, a high-priced lawyer from New York. Blane says goodbye to his wife Diane and his two little sons. On the train he has a conversation with newspaper reporter Ralph Adams, who's following the case.

When Blane arrives, he's regarded with mistrust by the local people. His skilful cross-examination of sheriff Nick Hoak results in Reston being acquitted.

Hoak decides to get even. He pressures juror Carol Morrow, his ex-lover, into claiming that Blane bribed her. Blane goes on trial. His wife Diane and his friend Billy show up to help him, but after collecting crucial evidence Billy is driven off a cliff. While defending himself, Blane begins to feel remorse over having won acquittals for so many guilty clients.

Blane ultimately is found not guilty based on the prospect the sheriff framed him in retaliation for his successful defence of Reston. Enraged by the acquittal, the sheriff intends to kill Blane as he goes down the Court-House steps. Before he can he is shot by Morrow. As she is arrested, the Blanes reconcile and leave town for good.

== Cast ==
- Jeff Chandler as James Blane
- Jeanne Crain as Diane Blane
- Jack Carson as Sheriff Hoak
- Gail Russell as Carol Morrow
- Elaine Stewart as Charleen Reston
- George Tobias as Billy Giles
- Edward Andrews as Lester Rawlings
- Phillip Reed as Michael Reston
- Edward Platt as Ralph Adams - Reporter (as Edward C. Platt)
- Paul Birch as Prosecutor Frank Mitchell
- Alexander Lockwood as Paul Vernon
- Edwin Jerome as Judge David L. Johnson
- William Schallert as Court Clerk
- June McCall as Girl at Slot Machine
- Frank J. Scannell as Cal Morrison - Blackjack Dealer (as Frank Scannell)
- Floyd Simmons as Larry Bell
- Ziva Rodann as Woman on Train (as Ziva Shapir)
- Marina Orschel as Girl by Pool
- Ingrid Goude as Girl by Pool

== Production ==
Chandler's casting was announced in June 1956. Zugsmith later recalled Chandler "was becoming a bit difficult and he was their (Universal's) second biggest star at the time. I guess one of the reasons was he was their biggest, and then Rock Hudson came along!"

Filming started on August 13, 1956. Shooting took place in Palm Springs.

== Reception ==
The Los Angeles Times wrote that Chandler "does the best acting job of his career" in the picture.

== Critical appraisal ==
Leonard Maltin called The Tattered Dress "slowly paced but watchable" and gave the film two-and-a-half stars (out of four); while Clive Hirschhorn, in his 1983 history of Universal Pictures, dismissed it as "a perfunctory piece of pulp fiction." But the British Film Institute Companion to Crime praised its noir visuals and saw it as a stylish precursor to Orson Welles' Touch of Evil, whch was also produced for Universal by Albert Zugsmith the following year.

Blake Lucas, in Film Noir: An Encyclopedic Reference to the American Style, also praised its "noir elements" but maintained "the main interest of the film... is the visual style of Jack Arnold. The desert setting recalls certain of his horror films, such as It Came From Outer Space and Tarantula; and it reveals that in this wasteland he finds a certain beauty that is very modern and strangely affecting. It is cleverly contrasted to the contemporary decors in which the characters exist and expresses a moral, as well as physical, desert."

Biographer Dana M. Reemes in Directed by Jack Arnold (1988) writes that the production provided “opportunities for considerable directorial creativity…The best example of this is without doubt the film’s prologue, which is very cinematic and utterly without dialogue.” Reemes writes: “It is a gripping scene, relying entirely on careful, intelligent staging and camera work. It is an example of Jack Arnold at his best.”

== See also ==
- List of American films of 1957

== Sources ==
- Reemes, Dana M. 1988. Directed by Jack Arnold. McFarland & Company, Jefferson, North Carolina 1988. ISBN 978-0899503318
