= A Slight Case of Larceny =

1953 film by Don Weis

- Theatrical release poster
- Directed by: Don Weis
- Screenplay by: Jerry Davis
- Story by: James Poe
- Produced by: Henry Berman
- Starring: Mickey Rooney; Eddie Bracken; Elaine Stewart; Marilyn Erskine; Douglas Fowley; Robert Burton
- Cinematography: Ray June
- Edited by: Ben Lewis
- Music by: Alberto Colombo
- Production company: Metro-Goldwyn-Mayer
- Distributed by: Metro-Goldwyn-Mayer
- Release date: June 5, 1953
- Running time: 71 minutes
- Country: United States
- Language: English
- Budget: $461,000
- Box office: $591,000

A Slight Case of Larceny is a 1953 comedy film directed by Don Weis, written by Jerry Davis, and starring Mickey Rooney, Eddie Bracken, Elaine Stewart, Marilyn Erskine, Douglas Fowley and Robert Burton. It was released on June 5, 1953, by Metro-Goldwyn-Mayer.

== Cast ==
- Mickey Rooney as Augustus 'Geechy' Cheevers
- Eddie Bracken as Frederick Winthrop Clopp
- Elaine Stewart as Beverly Ambridge
- Marilyn Erskine as Mrs. Emily Clopp
- Douglas Fowley as Mr. White
- Charles Halton as Willard Maibrunn
- Henry Slate as Motor Cop
- Rudy Lee as Tommy Clopp
- Mimi Gibson as Mary Ellen Clopp

== Reception ==
According to MGM records, the film earned $448,000 in the US and Canada and $143,000 elsewhere, making a loss to the studio of $104,000.
