= Desperate Search =

1952 film by Joseph H. Lewis

- 1952 Theatrical poster
- Directed by: Joseph H. Lewis
- Screenplay by: Walter Doniger
- Based on: Desperate Search; 1952 novel by Arthur Mayse
- Produced by: Matthew Rapf
- Starring: Howard Keel; Jane Greer; Patricia Medina; Keenan Wynn; Robert Burton
- Cinematography: Harold Lipstein
- Edited by: Joseph Dervin
- Music by: Rudolph G. Kopp
- Distributed by: Metro-Goldwyn-Mayer
- Release date: 1952
- Running time: 71 minutes
- Country: United States
- Language: English
- Budget: $520,000
- Box office: $707,000

Desperate Search is a 1952 American adventure film directed by Joseph H. Lewis and starring Howard Keel, Jane Greer, Patricia Medina and Keenan Wynn.

== Plot ==
After departing from Vancouver, a Canadian Western Airways Douglas DC-3 airliner catches fire and crashes in the Canadian north. On board are two young children, Don and Janet Heldon, who are the only survivors. Their father, pilot Vince Heldon and his wife Julie join forces with family friend and bush pilot Brandy and Nora Stead, the children's birth mother, to mount a desperate aerial search before incoming bad weather arrives.

Tensions mount as the children face the danger of exposure and a mountain lion that begins to track them. The searchers are in conflict, as the hotshot pilot Stead creates problems with her constant efforts to take command of the search.

A reconciliation and a successful rescue occur in the nick of time.

== Cast ==
- Howard Keel as Vince Heldon
- Jane Greer as Julie Heldon
- Patricia Medina as Nora Stead
- Keenan Wynn as Brandy
- Robert Burton as Wayne Langmuir
- Lee Aaker as Don Heldon
- Linda Lowell as Janet Heldon
- Michael Dugan as Lou
- Elaine Stewart as Stewardess
- Jonathan Cott as Detective
- Jeff Richards as Ed
- Dick Simmons as Communicator

== Production ==
Although authentic props are shown in Desperate Search, including a Douglas DC-3, most of the aerial scenes are composed of stock footage. Although director Joseph H. Lewis was offered the opportunity to shoot on location, almost all of the film takes place on MGM's backlot. Selected scenes from Captains of the Clouds (1942) are used, matching the action shot on the studio stage.

Filming took place primarily in the second half of June 1952.

== Reception ==
Variety called Desperate Search "strictly a routine offering" but praised Lewis's directing skill, which "hammers home as much tension and suspense as possible."

According to MGM records, the film earned $465,000 in the U.S. and Canada and $242,000 elsewhere, resulting in a loss of $88,000.
