= Fearless Fagan =

1952 film by Stanley Donen

- "Fearless Fagan" (1952) Poster
- Directed by: Stanley Donen
- Written by: Charles Lederer; Frederick Hazlett Brennan
- Story by: Sidney Franklin; Eldon W. Griffiths
- Starring: Janet Leigh; Carleton Carpenter; Keenan Wynn
- Cinematography: Harold Lipstein
- Edited by: George White
- Music by: Rudolph G. Kopp
- Distributed by: Metro-Goldwyn-Mayer
- Release date: August 7, 1952 (Indianapolis, Indiana)
- Running time: 79 minutes
- Country: United States
- Language: English
- Budget: $855,000
- Box office: $950,000

Fearless Fagan is a 1952 American comedy film directed by Stanley Donen and starring Janet Leigh and Carleton Carpenter.

== Plot ==
Circus clown Floyd Hilston, who performs a comedic lion act, learns that he is considered a draft dodger. He is permitted to enlist rather than serving a prison sentence, but he does not want to leave his best friend, a lion named Fearless Fagan, whom Floyd has raised for its entire life. Circus owner Owen Gillman offers to buy the lion, but Floyd fears for its welfare under the command of a lion tamer.

Floyd joins the army and hides Fagan somewhere on the base. Abby Ames, who is at the base to entertain the troops, finds Floyd and Fagan playing in the woods. She pledges to keep Fagan's presence a secret, but she soon appears in the woods with Colonel Horne and his troops in search of the lion.

When Fagan is found, Sgt. Kellwin, Captain Daniels and Colonel Horne try to help Floyd find the lion a home. After an exhaustive search, a home is found. Floyd is in love with Abby although she thinks that he is crazy.

Fagan escapes from his cage and tries to return to Floyd. After Floyd is recaptured, the army demands that Floyd sell Fagan to his old circus troupe or else it will be euthanized. When the lion tamer arrives to collect Fagan, he cracks his whip and is attacked. When Fagan wounds a soldier, Floyd is faced with a dilemma, knowing that a wounded lion will kill. He feels that he must shoot Fagan but he cannot pull the trigger. Fagan attacks Floyd, but Floyd is able to calm him.

Floyd awakens in the hospital to find Sgt. Kellwin, who tells him that he is to receive a medal and a ten-day pass. He also tells Floyd that Fagan is alive and that Abby has taken him to Hollywood. Floyd arrives at Abby's home but is horrified to see a lion-skin rug. Abby appears and leads Floyd to the outdoor pool, where Fagan is swimming.

== Cast ==
- Janet Leigh as Abby Ames
- Carleton Carpenter as Pvt. Floyd Hilston
- Keenan Wynn as Sgt. Kellwin
- Richard Anderson as Capt. Daniels
- Ellen Corby as Mrs. Ardley
- Fearless Fagan as Himself
- Barbara Ruick as Nurse
- John Call as Mr. Ardley
- Robert Burton as Owen Gillman
- Wilton Graff as Col. Horne
- Parley Baer as Emil Tauchnitz
- Jonathan Cott as Cpl. Geft

== Production ==
The screenplay was inspired by the story "Fearless Fagan Finds a Home" by Sidney Franklin, which was published in the February 12, 1951 issue of Life magazine. The original story concerns the real Pvt. Floyd D. Humeston, an animal trainer drafted into military service who was unable to find a temporary home for his pet lion Fagan and attempted to bring it to Fort Ord when he reported for duty. Fagan had previously appeared in films such as Samson and Delilah (1949). For Fearless Fagan, the lion was transported from the Columbus Zoo to Hollywood and appears as himself. Humeston served as a technical advisor for the film.

== Release ==
The film's world premiere was held in Indianapolis, Indiana on August 7, 1952, with Carpenter in attendance.

== Reception ==
Critic John L. Scott of the Los Angeles Times called the film "an amusing, sometimes hilarious piece of movie entertainment" wrote: "'Fearless Fagan' should be classified as a comedy melodrama, since it contains some serious, even hair-raising scenes. However, fun is the main item of the picture. ... The story moves along easily through a series of situations in which Fagan plays the central role, naturally."

Harrison's Reports found the film "a highly amusing comedy, the kind that will provoke uproarious laughter".

According to MGM records, the film earned $722,000 in the U.S. and Canada and $228,000 elsewhere, resulting in a loss of $324,000.
