= Code Two =

1953 film by Fred M. Wilcox

- Directed by: Fred M. Wilcox
- Screenplay by: Marcy Klauber
- Produced by: William Grady Jr.
- Starring: Ralph Meeker; Sally Forrest; Elaine Stewart
- Cinematography: Ray June
- Edited by: Fredrick Y. Smith
- Color process: Black and white
- Distributed by: Metro-Goldwyn-Mayer
- Release date: April 24, 1953
- Running time: 69 minutes
- Country: United States
- Language: English
- Budget: $472,000
- Box office: $711,000

Code Two is a 1953 American film noir crime film about men training to be motorcycle cops. It stars Ralph Meeker, Sally Forrest, Elaine Stewart, Robert Horton, and Keenan Wynn, and was directed by Fred M. Wilcox.

== Plot ==
Classmates at the Los Angeles police academy, Chuck O'Fair, Russ Hartley and Harry Whenlon bond as friends. When they socialize at one's house, Russ and his wife, Mary, observe as the extroverted Chuck expresses an interest in Mary's sister, Jane, who seems to prefer the shy Harry instead.

The three rookie cops become bored on the job. Seeking more action and excitement, they perk up after hearing from Sgt. Jumbo Culdane about the police department's motorcycle squad. Mary is skeptical, fearing for Russ's safety, but all three take the necessary training and are assigned to the motorcycle highway patrol.

While chasing a truck together, Chuck's cycle stalls so Harry proceeds by himself. He is knocked cold by one of the men in the truck, which then backs over him. Chuck is devastated by Harry's death and persuades his superiors to let him work undercover to find the culprits.

Discovering that the men he's looking for are modern cattle rustlers, Chuck confronts them and kills one before he is wounded. The other is taken into custody, and Chuck and Russ soon go back to work.

== Cast ==
- Ralph Meeker as Chuck
- Robert Horton as Russ
- Sally Forrest as Mary
- Jeff Richards as Harry
- Elaine Stewart as Jane
- Keenan Wynn as Jumbo
- Robert Burton as Police Capt. Bill Williams

== Reception ==
According to MGM records the movie earned $365,000 in the US and Canada and $346,000 elsewhere, making a loss to the studio of $37,000. Often referenced as the first modern motorcycle stunt film, released 8 months before The Wild One.
