= Howard Keel =

American actor and singer (1919–2004)

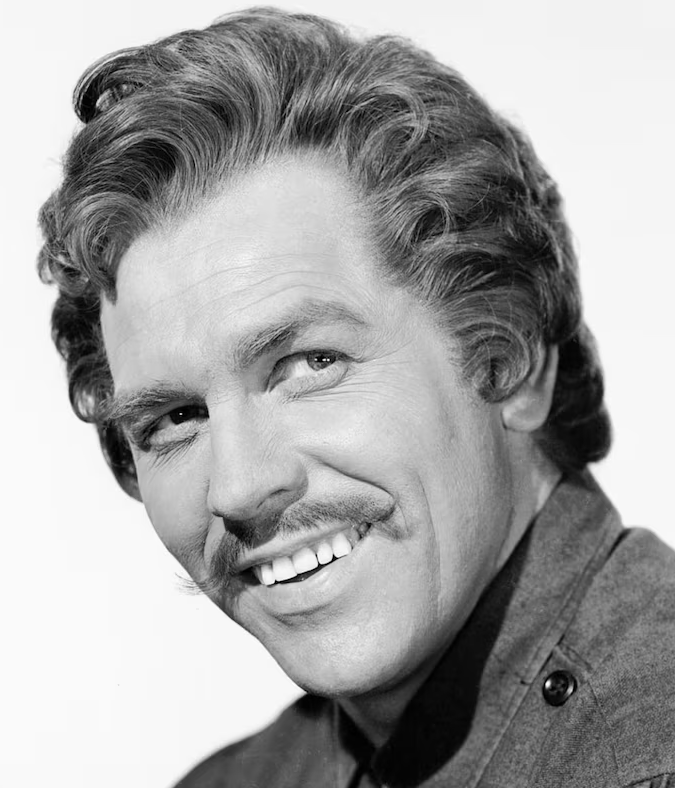
- Born: Harold Clifford Keel; April 13, 1919; Gillespie, Illinois, U.S.
- Died: November 7, 2004 (aged 85); Palm Desert, California, U.S.
- Occupations: Actor; singer
- Years active: 1943–2002
- Spouses: Rosemary Cooper (m. 1943; div. 1948); Helen Anderson (m. 1949; div. 1970); Judy Magamoll (m. 1970)
- Children: 4

President of the Screen Actors Guild
- In office 1958–1959
- Preceded by: Leon Ames
- Succeeded by: Ronald Reagan

Harold Clifford Keel (April 13, 1919 – November 7, 2004), professionally Howard Keel, was an American actor and singer known for his rich bass-baritone singing voice. He starred in a number of MGM musicals in the 1950s, including Show Boat (1951). He played the role of oil baron Clayton Farlow in the television series Dallas from 1981 to 1991.

== Early life ==
Keel was born in Gillespie, Illinois, the younger of two sons born to Navyman-turned-coalminer Homer Keel and his wife, Grace Margaret (née Osterkamp). Howard's elder brother was Frederick William Keel. After his father's death in 1930, Keel and his mother moved to California, where he graduated from Fallbrook High School at age 17. He worked various odd jobs until settling at Douglas Aircraft Company as a "traveling representative". He was a long haul truck driver.

In the 1950s, the MGM publicity department erroneously stated that Keel's birth name was Harold Leek.

== Career ==
At age 20, Keel was overheard singing by his landlady Mom Rider and was encouraged to take vocal lessons. One of his music heroes was the great baritone Lawrence Tibbett. Keel later remarked that learning that his own voice was a basso cantante was one of the greatest disappointments of his life. Nevertheless, his first public performance took place in the summer of 1941 when he played the role of Samuel the Prophet in Handel's oratorio Saul (singing a duet with bass-baritone George London).

In 1945, he made his Broadway debut as a vacation replacement for John Raitt in Carousel, playing the role of Billy Bigelow from August 20 - September 8, 1945. Two weeks later, on September 24, he took over the lead role of Curly in Oklahoma!, playing across the street at the St. James Theatre. He temporarily left Oklahoma! to fill-in once again for John Raitt, this time from June 3 - August 31, 1946, returning to Oklahoma! afterwards. In 1947, Oklahoma! became the first American postwar musical to travel to London, England, and Keel joined the production. On April 30, 1947, at the Drury Lane Theatre, the capacity audience (which included the future Queen Elizabeth II) demanded 14 encores.

Keel made his film debut as Harold Keel at the British Lion studio in Elstree, in The Small Voice (1948), released in the United States as The Hideout. He played an escaped convict holding a playwright and his wife hostage in their English country cottage. Additional Broadway credits include Saratoga, No Strings, and Ambassador. He appeared at The Muny in St. Louis as Adam in Seven Brides for Seven Brothers (1954), Emile de Becque in South Pacific (1992), and as General Waverly in White Christmas (2000).

=== MGM ===
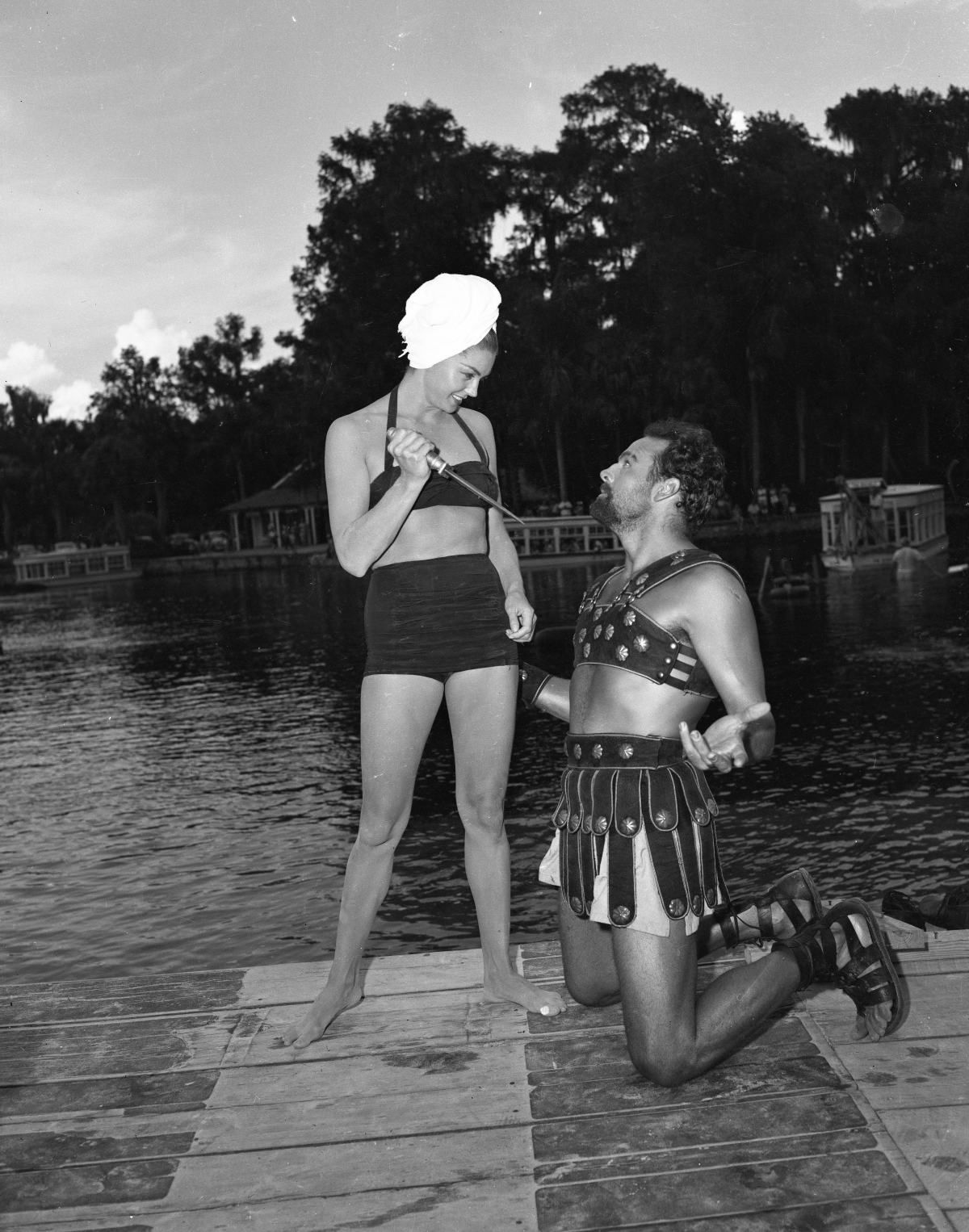
Esther Williams and Howard Keel

From London's West End, Keel went to Hollywood in 1949 where he was engaged by the Metro-Goldwyn-Mayer film studio. He made his musical film debut as Frank Butler in the film version of Irving Berlin's Annie Get Your Gun (1950), co-starring with Betty Hutton. The film was a big hit and established Keel as a star.

MGM put him with Esther Williams in Pagan Love Song (1950), which was successful, but not as profitable as most Esther Williams films because it went over budget. Keel had a third hit in a row with the comedy Three Guys Named Mike (1951), supporting Van Johnson and Jane Wyman.

Even more popular was Show Boat (1951), where Keel played the male lead with Kathryn Grayson and Ava Gardner. Keel was reunited with Williams in Texas Carnival (1952). He had his first flop at MGM with the comedy Callaway Went Thataway (1952) co-starring Fred MacMurray and Dorothy McGuire. Lovely to Look At (1952), with Grayson and based on the stage musical Roberta, was popular but lost money.

MGM tried him in the adventure film Desperate Search (1953), which was poorly received. So too was the comedy Fast Company (1953). More popular was Ride, Vaquero! (1953), with Gardner and Robert Taylor.

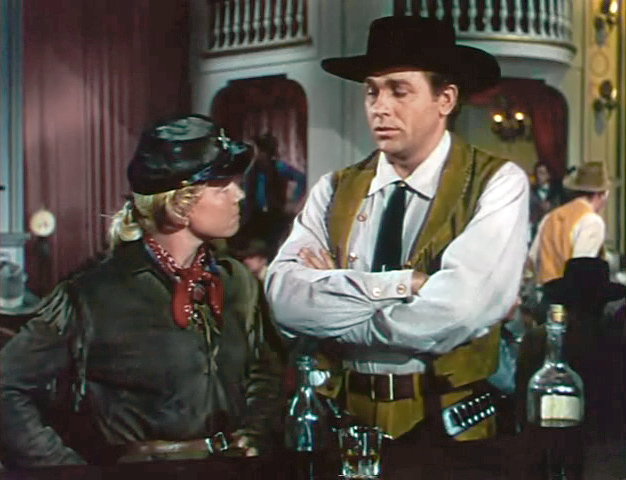
Doris Day and Howard Keel in Calamity Jane (1953)

Warner Bros borrowed Keel to play Wild Bill Hickok with Doris Day in Calamity Jane (1953), another hit. Back at MGM, he and Grayson made Kiss Me Kate (1953), which again was liked by the public but unprofitable. The same went for Rose Marie (1954) which Keel made with Ann Blyth. However Seven Brides for Seven Brothers (1954) with Jane Powell was a huge success, and it made MGM over $3 million in profit.

Keel was one of many guest stars in Deep in My Heart (1954). He and Williams made Jupiter's Darling (1955), which lost MGM over $2 million - the first Williams movie to lose money. Kismet (1955) with Blyth also lost over $2 million, and Keel was released from his MGM contract.

=== Post-MGM ===
He returned to his first love, the stage. In 1957, he was in a short-lived revival of Carousel. Keel's next film was made in Britain, the thriller Floods of Fear (1959). He returned to Hollywood to play Simon-Peter in the Biblical epic The Big Fisherman (1960). In 1959–1960, he was in the short-lived Broadway musical Saratoga. Keel went to Europe to make the low-budget film Armored Command (1961). In England, he starred in The Day of the Triffids (1962) and reprised his lead role in BBC 2's Kiss Me Kate, a black and white television production broadcast on 21 April 1964.

As America's taste in entertainment changed, finding jobs became more difficult for Keel. The 1960s held limited prospects for career advancement and consisted primarily of nightclub work, B-Westerns and summer stock. He did Carousel in 1962 and 1966. He replaced Richard Kiley on Broadway in No Strings (1962). Keel starred in Westerns for A. C. Lyles: Waco (1966), Red Tomahawk (1966) and Arizona Bushwhackers (1968). He had a supporting part in the John Wayne movie The War Wagon (1967).

In early 1970, Keel met Judy Magamoll, who was 25 years younger than he and who knew nothing about his stardom. Years later, Keel called the relationship love at first sight, but the age difference bothered him tremendously. For Magamoll, however, it was not a problem, and with the aid of Robert Frost's poem "What Fifty Said", she convinced him to proceed with their relationship. He resumed his routine of nightclub, cabaret and summer stock.

From 1971 to 1972, Keel appeared briefly in the West End and Broadway productions of the musical Ambassador, which flopped. In 1974, Keel became a father for the fourth time with the birth of his daughter Leslie Grace. In January 1986, he underwent double heart bypass surgery.

=== Dallas ===
Keel continued to tour with his wife and daughter in tow, but by 1980 had decided to make his life change. He moved his family to Oklahoma with the intention of joining an oil company. The family had barely settled down when Keel was called to California to appear with Jane Powell on an episode of The Love Boat. While there, he was told that the producers of the television series Dallas wanted to speak with him.

In 1981, after several guest appearances, Keel joined the show permanently as the dignified but hot-tempered oil baron Clayton Farlow. Starting with an appearance on the fourth season, the character had been meant as a semi-replacement patriarch for the series' Jock Ewing played by Jim Davis, who had died. However, Clayton was such a hit among viewers that he was made a series regular and stayed until its end in 1991. Not only did Dallas revive his acting career, it revived his recording endeavors.

=== Recording career ===
With renewed fame, Keel commenced his first solo recording career, at age 64, as well as a successful concert career in the UK. He released the album With Love in 1984, which sold poorly. However, his album And I Love You So reached No. 6 in the UK Albums Chart and No. 37 in Australia in 1984. The follow-up album, Reminiscing – The Howard Keel Collection peaked at No. 20 in the UK Albums Chart, spending 12 weeks in this listing in 1985 and 1986. The album also peaked at No. 83 in Australia. In 1988, the album Just for You reached No. 51 in the UK Albums Chart.

In 1994, Keel and Magamoll moved to Palm Desert, California. The Keels were active in community charity events, and attended the annual Howard Keel Golf Classic at Mere Golf Club in Cheshire, England, which raised money for the National Society for the Prevention of Cruelty to Children (NSPCC). Keel attended the event for many years until 2004.

== Honors ==
Keel received a star on the Hollywood Walk of Fame on 8 February 1960. It is located at 6253 Hollywood Boulevard.

A Golden Palm Star on the Walk of Stars was dedicated to him in 1996.

Keel was a member of the Grand Order of Water Rats.

In 2019, he was inducted into the Western Performers Hall of Fame at the National Cowboy & Western Heritage Museum in Oklahoma City, Oklahoma.

== Personal life and death ==
In 1943, Keel met and married actress Rosemary Cooper. They divorced in 1948. During the London run of Oklahoma! Keel met Helen Anderson, a member of the show's chorus, and they married in January 1949. Keel and Helen divorced in 1970. Keel married airline flight attendant Judy Magamoll in December 1970.

Keel had four children: three with second wife, Helen Anderson (two daughters, Kaija Liane and Kirstine Elizabeth; and a son, Gunnar Louis); one by his third wife of 34 years, Judy (a daughter, Leslie Grace); and 10 grandchildren.

Keel died at his Palm Desert home on November 7, 2004, six weeks after being diagnosed with colon cancer and a month before his film Seven Brides for Seven Brothers was inducted into the National Film Registry.

== Filmography ==
=== Film ===
Film
| Year | Title | Role | Notes |
|---|---|---|---|
| 1948 | The Small Voice | Boke | alternate title: The Hideout |
| 1950 | Annie Get Your Gun | Frank Butler | |
| 1950 | Pagan Love Song | Hazard Endicott | |
| 1951 | Three Guys Named Mike | Mike Jamison | |
| 1951 | Show Boat | Gaylord Ravenal | |
| 1951 | Texas Carnival | Slim Shelby | |
| 1951 | Across the Wide Missouri | Narrator | voice, uncredited |
| 1951 | Callaway Went Thataway | Stretch Barnes / Smoky Callaway | alternate title: The Star Said No |
| 1952 | Lovely to Look At | Tony Naylor | |
| 1952 | Desperate Search | Vince Heldon | |
| 1952 | The Hoaxters | Narrator | documentary |
| 1953 | Fast Company | Rick Grayton | |
| 1953 | Ride, Vaquero! | King Cameron | |
| 1953 | Calamity Jane | Wild Bill Hickok | |
| 1953 | Kiss Me Kate | Fred Graham/Petruchio | |
| 1954 | Rose Marie | Capt. Mike Malone | |
| 1954 | Seven Brides for Seven Brothers | Adam Pontipee | |
| 1954 | Deep in My Heart | Specialty in 'My Maryland' | |
| 1955 | Jupiter's Darling | Hannibal | |
| 1955 | Kismet | The Poet | |
| 1959 | Floods of Fear | Donovan | |
| 1959 | The Big Fisherman | Simon Peter | |
| 1961 | Armored Command | Col. Devlin | |
| 1962 | The Day of the Triffids | Bill Masen | |
| 1965 | The Man from Button Willow | Vocalist (opening and closing credits) | uncredited |
| 1966 | Waco | Waco | |
| 1967 | Red Tomahawk | Capt. Tom York | |
| 1967 | The War Wagon | Levi Walking Bear | |
| 1968 | Arizona Bushwhackers | Lee Travis | |
| 1994 | That's Entertainment! III | Himself | |
| 2002 | My Father's House | Roy Mardis | |

=== Television ===
Television
| Year | Title | Role | Notes |
|---|---|---|---|
| 1957 | Zane Grey Theater | Will Gorman | episode: "Gift from a Gunman" |
| 1957 | The Polly Bergen Show | Himself | episode: "December 7, 1957" |
| 1958 | Roberta | John Kent | Television film |
| 1961 | Tales of Wells Fargo | Justin Brox | episode: "Casket 7.3" |
| 1963 | Death Valley Days | Diamond Jim Brady | episode: "Diamond Jim Brady" |
| 1964 | Kiss Me, Kate | Fred Graham / Petruchio | BBC 2 |
| 1965 | Run for Your Life | Hardie Rankin | episode: "The Time of the Sharks" |
| 1967 | The Red Skelton Show | Police Officer McGoogle | episode: "A Christmas Urchin" |
| 1969 | Here's Lucy | Mr. Livingston | episode: "Lucy's Safari" |
| 1969 | Insight | Himself | episode: "Is the 11:59 Late This Year?" |
| 1975 | The Wheeltappers and Shunters Social Club | Himself | episode: "21, March 29 1975" |
| 1976 | The Quest | Shanghai Pierce | episode: "Seventy-Two Hours" |
| 1981 | The Love Boat | Duncan Harlow | episode: "Maid for Each Other/Lost and Found/Then There Were Two" |
| 1981–1991 | Dallas | Clayton Farlow | 234 episodes |
| 1982 | Fantasy Island | Colonel | episode: "The Big Bet/Nancy and the Thunderbirds" |
| 1983 | The Love Boat | Kyle Cummings | episode: "Long Time No See/The Bear Essence/Kisses and Makeup" |
| 1984 | Entertainment Express | Himself | episode: "Episode 2.2" |
| 1984 | Live from Her Majesty's | Himself | episode: "April 15, 1984" |
| 1985 | Doris Day’s Best Friends | Himself | episode: "Episode 1.14" |
| 1986 | Great Performances | Himself | episode: "Irving Berlin's America" |
| 1991 | Good Sports | Sonny Gordon | episode: "The Return of Nick" |
| 1991 | Murder, She Wrote | Larry Thorson | episode: "A Killing in Vegas" |
| 1993 | Bruce's Guest Night | himself "Guest" | BBC programme |
| 1994 | Hart to Hart: Home Is Where the Hart Is | Captain Quentin "Jack" Jackson | television film |
| 1995 | Walker, Texas Ranger | D.L. Dade | episode: "Blue Movies" |

== Stage work ==
- Oklahoma! (1945–46; 1947)
- Carousel (1946; 1957; 1962; 1966)
- South Pacific (1957; 1965; 1978; 1992)
- Mister Roberts (1959)
- Saratoga (1959)
- Kismet (1962)
- No Strings (1962–63)
- Show Boat (1963)
- Camelot (1964)
- Kiss Me, Kate (1964)
- On a Clear Day You Can See Forever (1967)
- The Fantasticks (1968)
- The Unsinkable Molly Brown (1971–1972; 1973)
- Ambassador (1971–72)
- The Most Happy Fella (1971)
- Man of La Mancha (1972)
- Seven Brides for Seven Brothers (1978)
- Paint Your Wagon (1979)
- I Do! I Do! (1980)
- My Fair Lady (1996)
- White Christmas (2000)

== Sources ==
- Leiby, Bruce R. (2007). "Keel, (Clifford) Howard". The Scribner Encyclopedia of American Lives. Archived from the original on May 18, 2013 – via HighBeam Research.
