= Carleton Carpenter =

American actor (1926–2022)

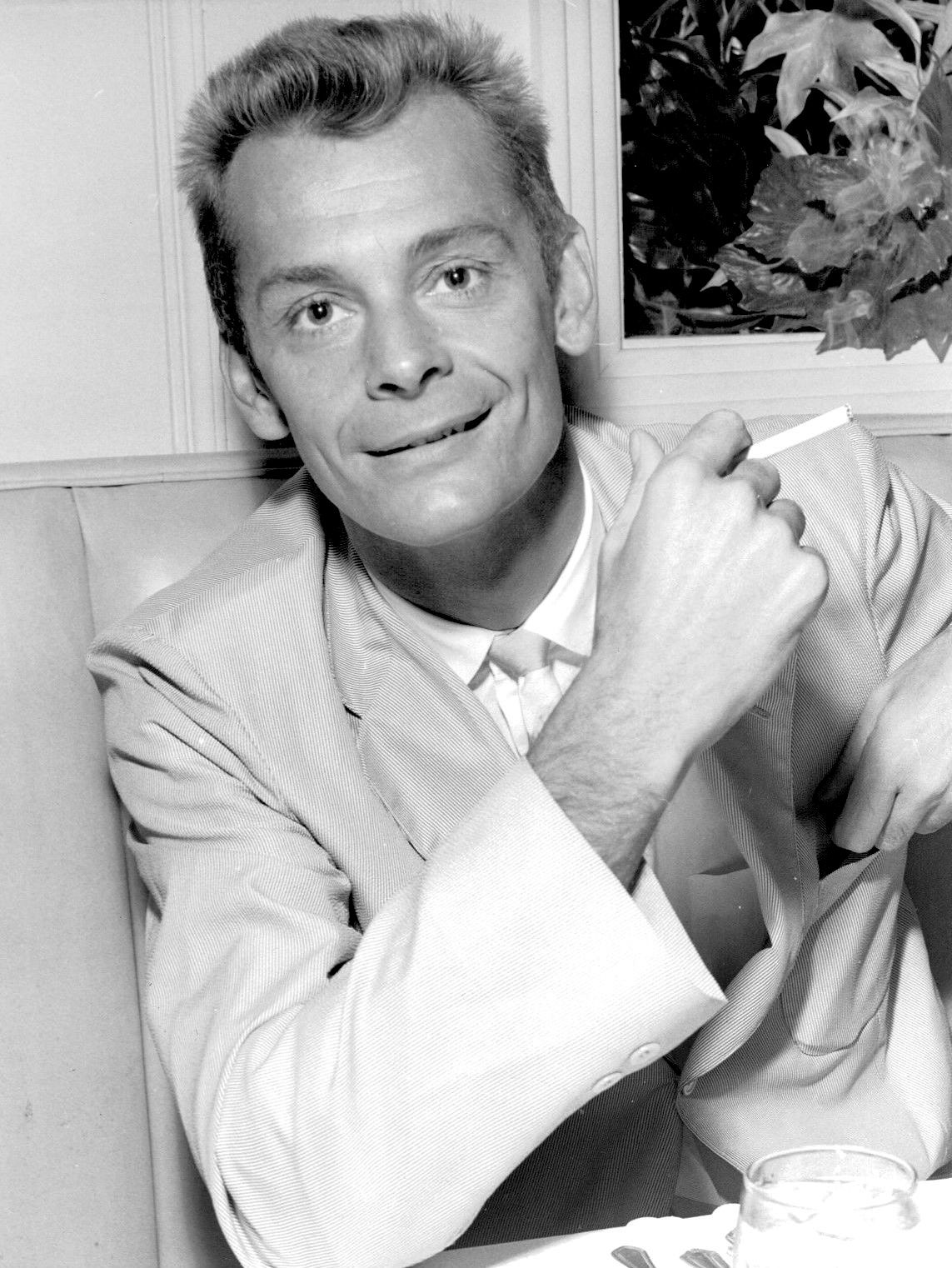
- Carpenter in 1962
- Born: Carleton Upham Carpenter Jr. July 10, 1926; Bennington, Vermont, U.S.
- Died: January 31, 2022 (aged 95); Warwick, New York, U.S.
- Occupations: Actor; magician; dancer; songwriter
- Years active: 1944–2015

Carleton Upham Carpenter Jr. (July 10, 1926 – January 31, 2022) was an American film, television and stage actor, magician, songwriter, and novelist.

== Early and personal life ==
Carpenter was born in Bennington, Vermont, where he attended Bennington High School. He was the son of Carleton Upham Carpenter Sr. He was bisexual.

Carpenter lived in Warwick, New York, where he died on January 31, 2022, at the age of 95.

== Military service ==
Carpenter served as a Seabee in the U.S. Navy during World War II and helped to build the airstrip from which the Enola Gay took off for its flight to bomb Hiroshima.

== Acting career ==
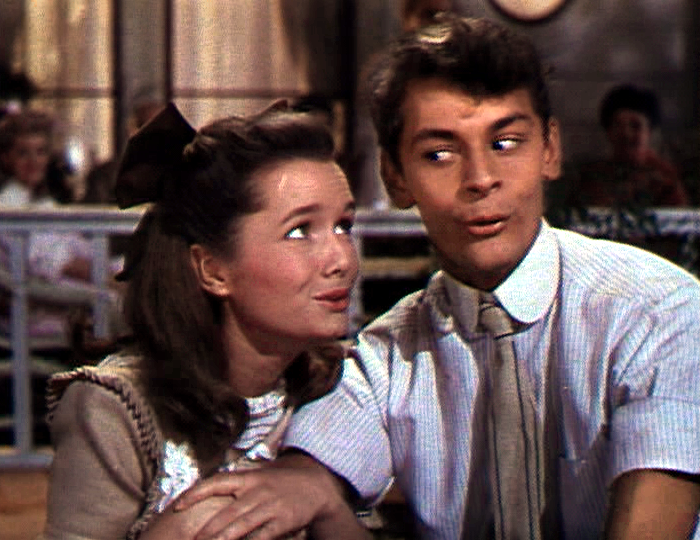
Carpenter with Debbie Reynolds in Two Weeks with Love (1950)

Carpenter began his performing career as a magician and an actor on Broadway, beginning with David Merrick's first production, Bright Boy, in 1944, followed by co-starring appearances in Three to Make Ready with Ray Bolger, John Murray Anderson's Almanac, and Hotel Paradiso. He was a featured player on the early television program Campus Hoopla, which was produced by NBC, via WNBT in New York City, and which aired from 1946 to 1947. Carpenter was brought to Hollywood in 1949 by independent producer Louis de Rochemont to play the boyfriend in Lost Boundaries. De Rochemont later cast him again, in The Whistle at Eaton Falls (1951).

Carpenter signed with Metro-Goldwyn-Mayer in 1950, where he made eight films in three years: Father of the Bride, Three Little Words, Summer Stock, Two Weeks With Love, Vengeance Valley, Fearless Fagan (his one-of-two leading roles there), Sky Full of Moon (his other leading role there) and Take the High Ground!. He gained fame in 1950 when he teamed up with Debbie Reynolds in Three Little Words and Two Weeks with Love. In a guest sequence in Three Little Words, they perform "I Wanna Be Loved by You" as vaudeville players Dan Healy and Helen Kane, with Reynolds dubbed by Kane. In Two Weeks with Love, where they have featured roles, their duet "Aba Daba Honeymoon" was the first soundtrack recording to become a top-of-the-chart gold record, reaching number three on the Billboard chart.

After 1953, Carpenter exited films for stage, television, and radio work. Among his television appearances, he played Gilbert Burton, the recipient of $1,000,000 in a 1959 episode of The Millionaire and co-starred with Ann Sothern in the 1954 TV production of Kurt Weill's Lady in the Dark, which he also recorded for RCA Victor Records. In 1957, he played the role of George "Tecumseh" McGuire in an episode of the television series "Men of Annapolis." In 1963, he played defendant Peter Brent in the Perry Mason episode "The Case of the Lover's Leap".

He returned to film in 1959 for Up Periscope for Warner Brothers and, much later, the independent films Cauliflower Cupids (1970) and Some of My Best Friends Are... (1971), as the character "Miss Untouchable".

Carpenter's later stage appearances included Hello, Dolly!, opposite Mary Martin (which toured Vietnam during the war and was filmed as a one-hour NBC-TV special), The Boys in the Band, Dylan, Crazy For You, and the City Center revival of Kander and Ebb's 70, Girls, 70. He was still working occasionally as a stage actor in 2015.

== Songwriting ==
Carpenter composed the songs "Christmas Eve", recorded by Billy Eckstine, "Cabin in the Woods", and "Ev'ry Other Day", which he recorded for MGM Records and sang on screen in The Whistle at Eaton Falls. In 1943 he wrote the words and melody of the song "Can We Forget". His other song compositions include "I Wouldn't Mind", "A Little Love", and "Come Away". He also wrote the musical Northern Boulevard, produced in New York City by actress Rosetta LeNoire.

== Writing ==
Carpenter wrote material for Debbie Reynolds, Kaye Ballard, Marlene Dietrich, and Hermione Gingold, and also scripts for films and television.

Carpenter was a successful mystery novelist in the 1970s and 1980s. His books include Deadhead, Games Murderers Play, Cat Got Your Tongue?, Only Her Hairdresser Knew, Sleight of Deadly Hand, The Peabody Experience, and Stumped.

His memoir, The Absolute Joy of Work, was published in 2016.

== Awards and honors ==
In 2012, he received a lifetime achievement award from the Hollywood film organization Cinecon, which was presented to him in person by his once often co-star Debbie Reynolds.

== Filmography ==
Year	Title	Role
1949	Lost Boundaries	Andy
1950	Father of the Bride	Usher at wedding
1950	Three Little Words	Dan Healy
1950	Summer Stock	Artie
1950	Two Weeks With Love	Billy Finlay
1951	Vengeance Valley	Hewie
1951	The Whistle at Eaton Falls	Eddie Talbot
1952	Fearless Fagan	Pvt. Floyd Hilston
1952	Sky Full of Moon	Harley 'Tumbleweeds' Williams
1953	Take the High Ground!	Merton 'Tex' Tolliver
1959	Up Periscope	Lt. Phil Carney
1970	Cauliflower Cupids	Christopher
1971	Some of My Best Friends Are...	Miss Untouchable
1981	The Prowler	1945 M.C
1983	The American Snitch	Arthur
