= Night Passage (film) =

1957 film by James Neilson

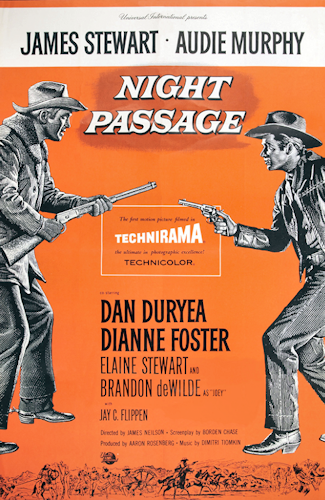
- 1957 theatrical poster by Reynold Brown
- Directed by: James Neilson
- Screenplay by: Borden Chase
- Based on: Night Passage; 1956 novel by Norman A. Fox
- Produced by: Aaron Rosenberg
- Starring: James Stewart; Audie Murphy; Dan Duryea; Dianne Foster; Elaine Stewart; Brandon deWilde; Jay C. Flippen
- Cinematography: William H. Daniels
- Edited by: Sherman Todd
- Music by: Dimitri Tiomkin
- Color process: Technicolor
- Production company: Universal Pictures
- Distributed by: Universal Pictures
- Release dates: July 17, 1957 (Denver, Colorado); July 24, 1957 (Los Angeles); July 24, 1957 (New York City)
- Running time: 90 minutes
- Country: United States
- Language: English
- Box office: $2.6 million (US)

Night Passage is a 1957 American Western film directed by James Neilson and starring James Stewart and Audie Murphy.

The film was the first American production to use the Technirama process by Technicolor. This process helped make the blue skies crisper and brighten the autumn footage photographed by cinematographer William H. Daniels.

== Plot ==
On the way to meet his former boss—railroad tycoon Ben Kimball—Grant McLaine rescues a young boy, Joey Adams, from villain Concho. Ben informs Grant that his payroll has been robbed three times already by a gang led by Whitey Harbin and the Utica Kid. If Ben's workers do not get paid soon, they will all leave the end-of-track work camp. Over the objections of Kimball's number 2, Jeff Kurth, Grant accepts the undercover job of carrying $10,000 to the crew by train. Kurth bets his job that Grant will fail.

When the train is held up again, Grant hides the money in a shoebox carried by Joey. The ploy works, but the young boy turns out to be friends with the Utica Kid, who takes him along with him. When the robbers cannot find the money, Whitey kidnaps Ben's wife Verna to hold for ransom. Concho, a gang member, pistol-whips Grant, sending him tumbling down the steep embankment unconscious. The train leaves without him.

When Grant wakes up, he trails the gang to an abandoned mining camp. He boldly asks to join up, revealing that he is the Kid's older brother. Utica is suspicious of his heretofore honest sibling, so Whitey (who dislikes the Kid) accepts him. Concho tries to shoot Grant unexpectedly, but Grant is faster on the draw. Afterwards, he tells the Kid where the money is in an attempt to reform his brother. It does not work. The Kid gives Grant ten minutes to leave before he tells the gang, but Grant calls his bluff.

Then railroad employee Will Renner, Whitey's informant, shows up to collect his share of the loot. He recognizes Grant (by the song he sings and plays on his accordion) as the man assigned to deliver the payroll. A gunfight ensues. Grant and Verna manage to escape. In the stable, they join Charlotte "Charlie" Drew, the Kid's girlfriend, and ride out after Lee and Joey. At the ore mill, Grant sends Verna to safety down the mountain in an ore bucket. Charlie stays and reloads Grant's gun. Meanwhile, the Kid plans to quietly ride away with Joey and the money.

When Joey suddenly bolts toward Grant, Whitey shoots, and the boy and his horse fall. Grant rushes to Joey's side and throws himself in front of the boy when the Kid rides up, gun aimed—at a gang member. The Kid joins forces with his brother. They kill all the gang members except Whitey, who crawls up close and shoots the Kid. Grant kills Whitey with their last bullet and holds his brother as he dies. The Kid admits that Grant "hit him hard" with the Bullfrog Line song, their father's favorite. Grant buries his brother and returns the payroll. Grant refuses Kurth's job, but accepts his old job. Grant sends Joey off to his new job, carrying water at end of track. Grant and Charlie follow Joey together.

== Cast ==
The film's cast was notable for having two famously highly decorated, real-life World War II combat veterans—former infantryman Murphy (Medal of Honor, Distinguished Service Cross, Silver Star, etc. -- "the most decorated Soldier in American history"), and former bomber pilot and squadron commander Stewart (Distinguished Flying Crosses, French Croix de Guerre, Air Medals, etc.) -- featured as this film's two lead actors. Also, each played the pacifist-hero character "Destry"—in 1939 or 1954 versions of the namesake western films—to critical acclaim.

- James Stewart as Grant McLaine
- Audie Murphy as The Utica Kid
- Dan Duryea as Whitey Harbin
- Dianne Foster as Charlotte "Charlie" Drew
- Elaine Stewart as Verna Kimball
- Brandon deWilde as Joey Adams
- Jay C. Flippen as Ben Kimball
- Herbert Anderson as Will Renner
- Robert J. Wilke as Concho
- Hugh Beaumont as Jeff Kurth
- Jack Elam as Shotgun
- Tommy Cook as Howdy Sladen
- Paul Fix as Clarence Feeney
- Olive Carey as Miss Vittles
- James Flavin as Tim Riley
- Donald Curtis as Jubilee
- Ellen Corby as Mrs. Feeney
- John Daheim as Latigo
- Kenny Williams as O'Brien
- Frank Chase as Trinidad
- Harold Goodwin as Pick Gannon
- Harold Hart as Tommy Shannon
- Jack C. Williams as Dusty
- Boyd Stockman as Torgenson
- Henry Wills as Pache
- Chuck Roberson as Roan
- Willard W. Willingham as Click
- Polly Burson as Rosa
- Patsy Novak as Linda
- Ted Mapes as Leary

== Production background ==
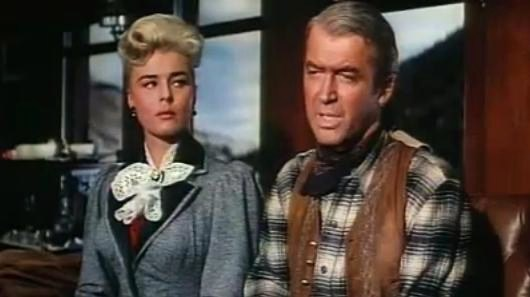
Elaine Stewart and James Stewart

The film is reminiscent of the popular western collaborations between Stewart and director Anthony Mann, who had directed Stewart eight times in the last six years. This is partly because the project was slated to be their sixth collaboration in the genre (ninth overall). Mann backed out of the project before production due to other obligations and a disagreement over the casting of Audie Murphy and was replaced by James Neilson.

Mann and Stewart did not work together again. Aaron Rosenberg, who produced several of the Stewart-Mann collaborations as well as Night Passage, said that Stewart and Mann fell out after a disagreement over the film's quality, which according to Mann was "trash". Mann felt that Stewart was only making the film so he could play his accordion. This enraged Stewart so much that the two did not speak again.

Dimitri Tiomkin scored the film and co-wrote the songs "Follow the River" and "You Can't Get Far Without a Railroad" with Ned Washington, which Stewart performed himself. The film also offered Stewart the rare opportunity to play the accordion, an instrument he had played since childhood. However, his accordion playing was rerecorded by a professional during post-production.

The railroad scenes were filmed at the Durango & Silverton Narrow Gauge Railroad in Durango, Colorado, using Denver & Rio Grande Western Railroad K-28 Class steam locomotive #476 which still operates in excursion service there today. Considerable footage from the railroad scenes was recycled into the 1966 Audie Murphy film Gunpoint.

Co-star Dianne Foster witnessed Audie Murphy's legendary temper when filming a scene in which his horse would not co-operate and several takes were needed. Murphy was riding his own horse, a quarter-horse named Flying John. Murphy became so angry with the animal that he punched it in the face. The film is one of the few in which Murphy played a villain.

== Home media ==
=== Video ===
Over the years, Night Passage has been released in several single and collection forms on VHS and DVD media. More recently, it now appears on Blu-ray.

=== Soundtrack ===
In 2024 Dimitri Tiomkin's original score was featured in a limited-release CD with Bonus material from Intrada.

== See also ==
- List of American films of 1957
