= Marilyn Erskine =

American actress (born 1926)

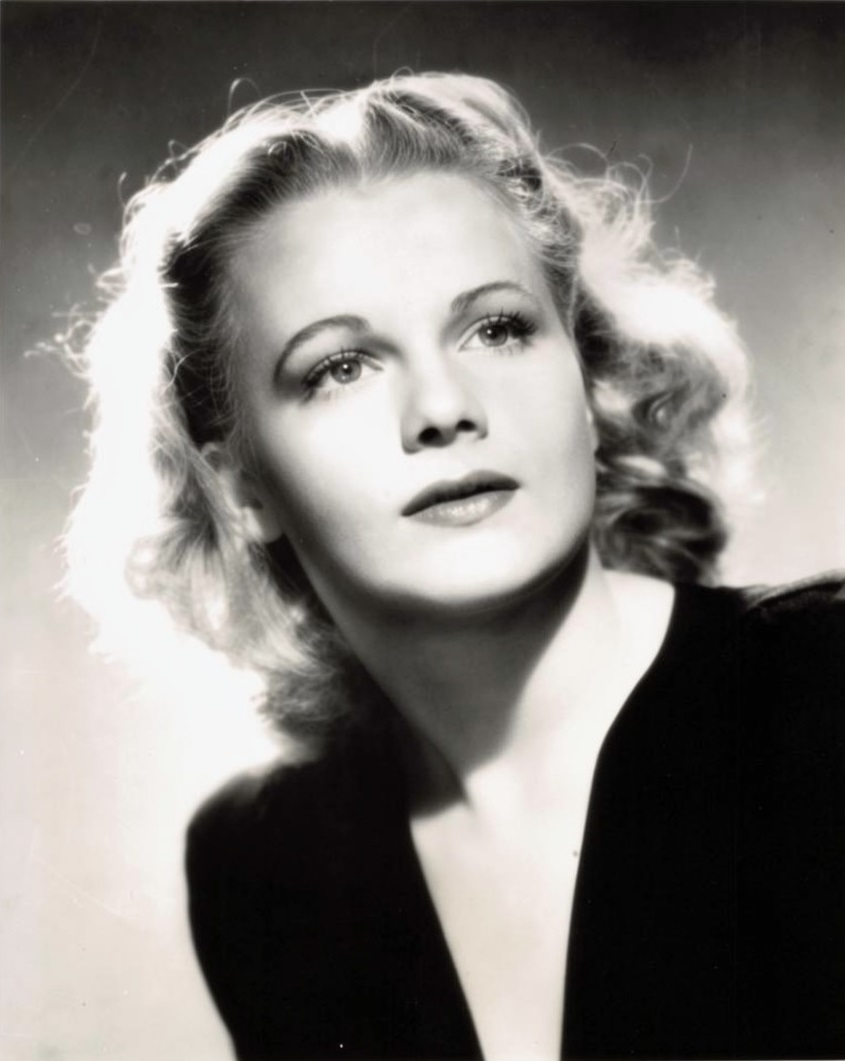
- Erskine in the radio program True Detective Mysteries (1946)
- Born: Marilyn Erskine; April 24, 1926 (age 100); Rochester, New York, U.S.
- Occupation: Actress
- Years active: 1929–1972
- Spouses: Stanley Kramer (m. 1945; ann. 1945) Charles Curland (m. 1955)
- Children: 2

Marilyn Erskine (born April 24, 1926) is an American actress, active during the 1920s through the 1970s. She played roles in radio, theater, film, and television, starting when she was 3 years old.

== Early life ==
Erskine was born in Rochester, New York on April 24, 1926, and was in show business from early childhood. She moved with her family to New York, circa 1932, at which point she began attending the Professional Children's School, which she continued to do, intermittently, for almost a decade.

== Career ==
=== Radio and theatre ===
Erskine started her performing career at the age of three years, appearing on a local radio show in Buffalo, New York. She also appeared on the nationwide CBS radio show Let's Pretend sometime between 1929 and 1937, where children played all the roles in adaptions of fairy tales and other children's stories. She played Gail Carver in the soap opera Lora Lawton, which ran on NBC 1943–1950, Jane Brown on Young Widder Brown, which ran on NBC 1938–1956, and Cherry Martin in The Romance of Helen Trent, which ran on CBS 1933–1960. Erskine performed the role of Jane Baxter in Orson Welles's Mercury Theater on the Air adaptation of Seventeen (October 16, 1938).

Erskine starred as Eva Wallace in the 1939 Broadway production of The Primrose Path. In 1945, she was a member of the cast of the syndicated comedy Keeping Up with Wigglesworth.

As a teenager, she appeared in at least nine Broadway productions in New York City, including the original production of Thornton Wilder's classic play Our Town:

- Excursion (playing Eileen Loschavio) April 9, 1937 – July ?, 1937
- The Ghost of Yankee Doodle (playing Patience Garrison) November 22, 1937 – January ?, 1938
- Our Town (playing Rebecca Gibbs) February 4, 1938 – November 19, 1938
- The Primrose Path (playing Eva Wallace) January 4, 1939 – May ?, 1939
- Goodbye in the Night (playing Gertie) March 18–23, 1940
- Ring Around Elizabeth (playing Mercedes) November 17–25, 1941
- What Big Ears! (playing Betty Leeds) April 20–25, 1942
- Nine Girls (playing Shirley) January 13–16, 1943
- Pretty Little Parlor (playing Anastasia) April 17–22, 1944

As an adult, she appeared in at least one Broadway production in New York City and several Off-Broadway plays:

- The Linden Tree (playing Dinah Linden) March 2–6, 1948
- Our Town (playing Emily Webb) 1953–1955

=== Film and television ===
Erskine appeared in several Hollywood movies in the early 1950s. Already in 1940, she stated a desire to become a Hollywood actress when she became an adult. Her first film was the 1951 western, Westward the Women, where she had a supporting role as Jean Johnson; she also appeared in MGM's documentary on the making on that film, Challenge the Wilderness (1951). The following year, she appeared in Above and Beyond, The Girl in White, and Just This Once, again in supporting roles. Her first co-starring role was in the 1953 musical biopic The Eddie Cantor Story. It was based on the life of the American singer and actor Eddie Cantor, who was still alive at the time. She then featured in a couple of films in 1953, before moving on to television. She was one of the narrators for the MGM documentary The Hoaxters (1953), a short history of communism.

Erskine appeared in almost every anthology drama series of the Golden Age of Television, from General Electric Theater to Westinghouse Studio One to Science Fiction Theater to Lux Video Theater to Climax!, appearing in over fifty different productions on thirty different series from 1949 to 1962. In her later career, after 1962, she primarily played roles on westerns and crime dramas. She was co-starred on the television series The Tom Ewell Show, playing Tom's wife, Frances Potter. This sitcom ran from September 1960 through May 1961 on CBS. She was a co-presenter for the Short Subject Awards category of the 26th Annual Academy Awards in 1954, and appeared as herself in the last episode of The NBC Comedy Hour June 10, 1956. She made two guest appearances on Perry Mason starring Raymond Burr. In 1964 she played Susan Pelham in "The Case of the Careless Kidnapper", and in 1966 she played Mirabel Corum in "The Case of the Unwelcome Well". Her last role on television was in 1972, in the Ironside TV series, also starring Burr.

== Personal life ==
Erskine married Hollywood producer and director Stanley Kramer in May 1945. The marriage was annulled two months later. She later remarried, to insurance executive Charles Curland (1925–2012) in 1955, and had two children. Their home in Brentwood, California, was featured in an article in the Fall 1958 issue of Architectural Digest.

== Filmography ==
- Westward the Women (1951) playing Jean Johnson
- Above and Beyond (1952) playing Marge Bratton
- The Girl in White (1952) playing Nurse Jane Doe
- The Hoaxters (1952) narrated by her
- Just This Once (1952) playing Gertrude Crome
- The Eddie Cantor Story (1953) playing Ida Tobias Cantor
- A Slight Case of Larceny (1953) playing Mrs. Emily Clopp
- Confidentially Connie (1953) playing Phyllis Archibald
- Science Fiction Theater (1955–1956) Episodes "The Frozen Sound", "The Legend of Crater Mountain", "Sun Gold"
- End of a Gun (1957) playing Peggy
