= Take the High Ground! =

1953 film by Richard Brooks

- Cover art of Take the High Ground!
- Directed by: Richard Brooks
- Screenplay by: Millard Kaufman
- Story by: Millard Kaufman
- Produced by: Dore Schary
- Starring: Richard Widmark; Karl Malden; Carleton Carpenter; Russ Tamblyn; Elaine Stewart
- Cinematography: John Alton
- Edited by: John Dunning
- Music by: Dimitri Tiomkin
- Color process: Ansco Color
- Production company: Metro-Goldwyn-Mayer
- Distributed by: Loew's Inc
- Release date: October 30, 1953
- Running time: 101 minutes
- Country: United States
- Language: English
- Budget: $1,166,000
- Box office: $2,855,000

Take the High Ground! is a 1953 American war film directed by Richard Brooks and starring Richard Widmark and Karl Malden as Thorne Ryan and Laverne Holt, drill sergeants who must transform a batch of everyday civilians into soldiers during the Korean War. The film presents a highly fictionalized portrayal of army life.

== Plot ==
In May 1953, a new group of Army recruits at Fort Bliss in El Paso, Texas, encounter their drill sergeants, SSG Laverne Holt and the deeply troubled SFC Thorne Ryan. After Ryan's caustic appraisal of the recruits, Holt vows to make soldiers out of them during their sixteen weeks of basic training. The two men served together in Korea and are combat veterans. Ryan, though, resents his stateside duty and repeatedly applies for transfer back to the Korean front.

One night, the men cross the border to Mexico for recreation. In a bar, Ryan and Holt see a beautiful woman, Julie Mollison, buying drinks for a group of young recruits, including some of their own. Later that evening, the two sergeants escort the inebriated Julie to her apartment, and Ryan finds himself drawn to her.

Training becomes more intensive. Ryan exposes his men to tear gas to prepare them for the harsh conditions of battle. Ryan and Holt return to the bar one night, and find Julie sitting alone. When the crude MSG Vince Opperman insults Julie, she runs out of the bar in tears, and Holt comforts her. Ryan and Opperman fight, and Opperman reveals that Julie was married to a soldier who was killed in Korea shortly after she left him.

One day, recruit Lobo Naglaski visits the camp chaplain to confess his murderous feelings toward Ryan, but comes to see that the sergeant has very little time in which to do a tough job. Tensions arise between Ryan and Holt, both over Ryan's callous treatment of the men and Holt's relationship with Julie. Ryan puts his men through increasingly tough drills; during field training, a bitter confrontation erupts between the two sergeants. Holt slugs Ryan and walks away.

Later, Ryan calls on Julie at her apartment, and they fall into a passionate embrace. She resists his further advances, however; he becomes insulting and casts aspersions on her virtue, chiding her for having given her husband "the brush" when she did.

Recruit Donald Quentin Dover IV refuses to throw a hand grenade and, after the group has bivouacked as part of more field drills, he "goes over the hill", intending to desert. Ryan tracks him down and gives the young man a second chance, confessing that his own father had been a deserter.

As the training period draws to a close, Ryan returns to Julie's apartment and discovers she has moved out. He finds Julie and Holt at the train station. After Holt leaves, Ryan apologizes for his behavior and asks Julie to marry him, but she sadly points out that he is married to the Army. Outside the train station, Ryan and Holt silently make their peace. The men finish basic training, and as the new soldiers march by during their graduation exercises, Ryan proudly points them out to a fresh group of recruits.

== Cast ==
- Richard Widmark as SFC Thorne Ryan
- Karl Malden as SSG Laverne Holt
- Elaine Stewart as Julie Mollison
- Carleton Carpenter as Merton Tolliver
- Russ Tamblyn as Paul Jamison
- Jerome Courtland as Elvin Carey
- Steve Forrest as Lobo Naglaski
- Robert Arthur as Donald Quentin Dover IV
- Chris Warfield as Soldier
- William Hairston as Daniel Hazard
- Maurice Jara as Franklin D. No Bear
- Bert Freed as MSG Vince Opperman

== Production ==
The film was originally to be shot at Marine Corps Recruit Depot San Diego, under the title The Making of a Marine based on an original by Millard Kaufman. It was later asserted that "the Marines refused to cooperate because they did not want to stir up old controversies over the toughness of their training program." The Army, however, cooperated fully with the studio, and location filming took place at Fort Bliss, El Paso, Texas. According to a pre-production The Hollywood Reporter news item, James Arness, Ralph Meeker, James Whitmore, William Campbell, and Richard Anderson were cast, but they were not in the film.

It was Russ Tamblyn's first film under his contract with MGM.

== Reception ==
According to MGM records, the film earned $1,968,000 in the US and Canada and $887,000 elsewhere, resulting in a profit of $244,000.

The film was nominated for an Academy Award for Best Original Screenplay, losing to Titanic at the 26th Academy Awards.
