= Anne Whitfield =

American actress (1938–2024)

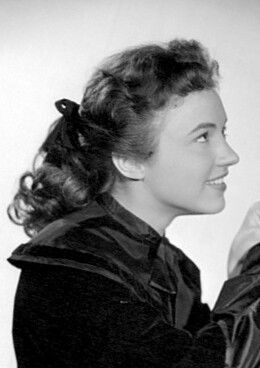
- Whitfield, in 1956
- Born: August 27, 1938; Oxford, Mississippi, U.S.
- Died: February 15, 2024 (aged 85); Washington, U.S.
- Occupations: Actress, environmental and political activist
- Years active: 1945–1985
- Known for: White Christmas
- Spouse(s): Frederick Roy Schiller (m. 1958; div. 1969) John F. Phillips (m. 1976; div. 2008)
- Children: 3 (2 with Frederick Roy Schiller, 1 with John F. Phillips)

Anne Langham Whitfield (August 27, 1938 – February 15, 2024) was an American actress on old-time radio, television, stage, and film. Her first name is sometimes seen spelled Ann.

== Personal life and death ==
Whitfield was born in Oxford, Mississippi, in 1938, and was the daughter of Richard N. Whitfield, Jr. and Frances Turner Whitfield. Her father was director of bands at the University of Mississippi and her mother was a speech teacher. After moving to California, she attended Rosewood Avenue Public School. By the time she was 17, she was studying at the University of California, Los Angeles, scheduling her classes around her work on radio programs.

During the 1970s, Whitfield lived in Olympia, Washington, working at the Washington State Department of Ecology at Evergreen State College with an interest in clean water. She later undertook pursuits in women's rights, environmental issues, and homelessness. Whitfield died after an incident while walking in her neighborhood near Burien, Washington, on February 15, 2024. She was 85.

== Radio ==
As a youngster, Whitfield "played child roles on practically every comedy and dramatic series originating in Hollywood". Her radio debut came in September 1945, when she "stepped up on a box before an already lowered microphone in an NBC studio and said, 'I want another slice of bread'" for a commercial. She became a member of the cast of One Man's Family when she was seven years old.

Whitfield's roles on radio programs include:

Program	Role
The Baby Snooks Show	Pamela Richardson
Dr. Paul	Christopher Martin
Mr. and Mrs. Blandings	Susan Blandings
One Man's Family	Penny Lacey
Our Miss Brooks	Harriet Conklin
The Phil Harris-Alice Faye Show	Phyllis

She was also heard on Lux Radio Theatre, The Screen Guild Theater, Family Theater, Cavalcade of America, The Cisco Kid, His Honor, the Barber, Phone Again, Dr. Paul, The Harold Peary Show, NBC University Theatre, and The Woman in My House.

== Stage, film, and television ==
In 1949, Whitfield appeared in theatrical productions of Annie Get Your Gun and Show Boat, both in Los Angeles, California. On film, she played Susan Waverly in White Christmas (1954) and appeared in Juvenile Jungle (1958) and Tick, Tick, Tick (1970).

In 1960, she played the role of Trudy (working bar girl in the Long Branch) in the season-six episode "Don Matteo" in the TV Western Gunsmoke, then again in one of its 1966 episodes “Stage Stop” as Lori Coombs, an abused wife who later falls in love with a blind man after her husband is killed.

Whitfield played Claudia Barbour in the TV version of One Man's Family. The casting was a change from Whitfield's role in the radio version of the program; in the story, Claudia was the mother of Penny, whom Whitfield played on radio. She played the two roles concurrently during the TV series' single season on the air. Whitfield also was featured in "The Case of the Ugly Duckling", "The Case of the Crafty Kidnapper", and "The Case of the Nautical Knot", episodes of Perry Mason (1964); "The Storm Riders" on Cheyenne (June 24, 1956), and then subsequently in another episode, "The Young Fugitives" (October 23, 1961); "Judgment at Hondo Seco" on Rawhide (October 20, 1961); and "Harry, the Good Neighbor' on The New Phil Silvers Show (February 22, 1964). In the '60s, she was also active in series such as Adam-12, Emergency!, The New Interns, 77 Sunset Strip, Laramie, Hawaiian Eye, the Untouchables, Ben Casey, The Dakotas, 12 O'clock High, Peter Gunn, Manhunt, and the Johnny Carson Show. She played Jack Nicholson's girlfriend in Wells Fargo and Robert Redford's estranged wife in Tate – both superstars' first TV shows. Whitfield's all-time favorite role was as Sally Ellis, an Arkansas farm girl, in One Step Beyond (1960).
