= Ride, Vaquero! =

1953 film by John Farrow

- Original film poster
- Directed by: John Farrow
- Written by: Frank Fenton
- Produced by: Stephen Ames
- Starring: Robert Taylor; Ava Gardner; Howard Keel; Anthony Quinn; Kurt Kasznar; Ted de Corsia
- Cinematography: Robert Surtees
- Edited by: Harold F. Kress
- Music by: Bronislau Kaper
- Distributed by: Metro-Goldwyn-Mayer
- Release date: July 15, 1953
- Running time: 90 minutes
- Country: United States
- Language: English
- Budget: $1,128,000
- Box office: $3,427,000

Ride, Vaquero! is a 1953 American Western film photographed in Ansco Color (print by Technicolor) made by Metro-Goldwyn-Mayer (MGM). It was directed by John Farrow and produced by Stephen Ames from a screenplay by Frank Fenton and John Farrow. The music score was by Bronislau Kaper and the cinematography by Robert Surtees.

The film stars Robert Taylor, Ava Gardner, Anthony Quinn, and Howard Keel with Kurt Kasznar, Ted de Corsia and Jack Elam. Movita appears uncredited in a small role.

== Plot ==
Mexican bandit Jose Esqueda resents settlers in the Brownsville, Texas region, and conducts raids against them. He threatens to burn down their homes, and has burned down the ranch house King Cameron has just built for his wife Cordelia.

Rio, raised like a brother to Esqueda, joins forces with him at first. But in time he forms a partnership with Cameron instead, and even saves his life, although Cordelia continues not to trust him.

Complications arise when Cordelia's distrust turns to desire. Cameron must save both his property and his marriage after Esqueda goes on a rampage, robbing Brownsville's bank and killing the sheriff.

Shot several times by Esqueda and close to death, Cameron is once again saved by Rio, who confronts Esqueda in a final gunfight. Cameron forgives Cordelia for her feelings toward Rio.

== Cast ==
- Robert Taylor as Rio
- Ava Gardner as Cordelia Cameron
- Howard Keel as King Cameron
- Anthony Quinn as Jose Esqueda
- Jack Elam as Barton
- Kurt Kasznar as Father Antonio

== Production ==
Parts of the film were shot in Kanab Canyon and Johnson Canyon in Utah.

== Reception ==
According to MGM records the film earned $1,834,000 in the US and Canada and $1,593,000 elsewhere resulting in a profit of $895,000.
