= The Hoaxters =

1952 film

- Theatrical Film Poster
- Directed by: Herman Hoffman
- Written by: Herman Hoffman
- Produced by: Herman Hoffman; Dore Schary
- Narrated by: Marilyn Erskine
- Edited by: Harry Komer; Laurie Vejar
- Music by: Rudolph G. Kopp
- Distributed by: Metro-Goldwyn-Mayer
- Release date: December 5, 1952
- Running time: 36 minutes
- Country: United States
- Language: English
- Budget: $119,000
- Box office: $177,000

The Hoaxters is a 1952 American documentary film about the threat posed by communism to the American way of life. It was nominated for an Academy Award for Best Documentary Feature. The Warner Home Video DVD release of the 1998 CNN documentary The Cold War in 2012 included this film as a special feature. According to MGM records, the film earned $167,000 in the US and Canada and $10,000 elsewhere.

== Cast ==
- Marilyn Erskine as Narrator (voice)
- Howard Keel as Narrator (voice)
- George Murphy as Narrator (voice)
- Walter Pidgeon as Narrator (voice)
- Dore Schary as Narrator (voice)
- Barry Sullivan as Narrator (voice)
- Robert Taylor as Narrator (voice)
- James Whitmore as Narrator (voice)
- Sidney Tomack as the Snake Oil Salesman (uncredited)
