= The Eddie Cantor Story =

1953 American film by Alfred E. Green

- Directed by: Alfred E. Green
- Written by: Jerome Weidman; Ted Sherdeman; Sidney Skolsky
- Produced by: Sidney Skolsky
- Starring: Keefe Brasselle; Marilyn Erskine; Aline MacMahon
- Cinematography: Edwin B. DuPar
- Edited by: William H. Ziegler
- Music by: Ray Heindorf
- Production company: Warner Bros. Pictures
- Distributed by: Warner Bros. Pictures
- Release dates: 25 December 1953 (NYC); 20 January 1954 (US)
- Running time: 115 minutes
- Country: United States
- Language: English
- Box office: $2.3 million (US)

The Eddie Cantor Story is a 1953 American musical drama film directed by Alfred E. Green and starring Keefe Brasselle, Marilyn Erskine and Aline MacMahon. It is a biopic based on the life of Eddie Cantor featuring Brasselle as Cantor. It was produced and distributed by Warner Bros. Pictures. Cantor himself appeared briefly in the film in a cameo role.

== Plot ==
Raised by his grandmother on New York's East Side, 13-year-old Eddie sings while another neighborhood kid, Rocky Kramer, and his gang, pick pockets. Eddie is sent by Grandma Esther to a boys' camp, where he entertains the others with his songs and routines.

Ida Tobias, daughter of a local merchant, elopes with Eddie a few years later. Rocky is now a local politician and gets Eddie a job in a nightclub. Eddie tells the family he's the star performer there, but he is actually a singing waiter. However, piano player Jimmy Durante helps land him a job in a California show.

A headline performer envious of Eddie's popularity pulls a prank, telling him Flo Ziegfeld wants him for the Follies show in New York. It turns out Ziegfeld has never heard of Eddie when he arrives at the theater, but an audition by Eddie is so good, Ziegfeld does indeed hire him.

Ida gives birth to several children while Eddie becomes a big success. She is upset that his family doesn't seem to come first, and matters are complicated when Eddie's fortune is lost in the 1929 stock-market crash. A heart attack slows Eddie, as well, but he prospers on the radio as his health improves, and soon he is happy at work and at home.

== Cast ==
- Keefe Brasselle as Eddie Cantor
- Marilyn Erskine as Ida
- Aline MacMahon as Grandma Esther
- Gerald Mohr as Rocky
- Arthur Franz as Harry Harris
- Alex Gerry as David Tobias
- Greta Granstedt as Rachel Tobias
- Jackie Barnett as Jimmy Durante
- Dick Monda as Eddie - aged 13
- Marie Windsor as Cleo Abbott
- Douglas Evans as Leo Raymond
- Ann Doran as Lillian Edwards
- Hal March as Gus Edwards
- Susan Odin as Ida - age 11
- Owen Pritchard as Harry Harris - as a Boy
- Will Rogers Jr. as Will Rogers
- William Forrest as Flo Ziegfeld
- Nedrick Young as Jack
- James Craven as Bert Glenville
- Kathleen Case as Francey
- Chick Chandler as Lesser
- Kermit Maynard as Willie
- James Flavin as Kelly - Policeman
- Julie Newmar as Showgirl
- Barbara Pepper as Patron
- Eddie Cantor as Audience Member

== Production and reception ==
Announced in 1948 with a budget of $3 million, Warner Bros. Pictures attempted to duplicate the box-office success of The Jolson Story, even hiring the film's producer Sidney Skolsky and director Alfred E. Green. The Eddie Cantor Story found an audience but might have fared better with a different leading man. Actor Keefe Brasselle played Cantor as a caricature with high-pressure dialogue and bulging eyes wide open; Brasselle was considerably taller than Cantor, which did not help the illusion. Cantor recorded 20 songs for the soundtrack, which Brasselle lip-synched.

Eddie and Ida Cantor themselves are seen in a brief prologue and epilogue set in a projection room, where they are watching Brasselle in action; at the end of the film, Eddie tells Ida "I never looked better in my life"... and gives the audience a knowing, incredulous look. George Burns, in his memoir All My Best Friends, claimed that Warner Bros. created a miracle producing the movie in that "it made Eddie Cantor's life boring".

Motion Picture Daily drew a parallel with The Jolson Story: "[The producers] have brought forth a directly comparable picture, with Eddie Cantor singing 20 of his great songs. All in all, it is an expertly wrought film record of a great entertainer's finely lived and happily continuing career." The reviewer spoke fondly of Cantor but had little to say about Brasselle: "Eddie had full approval right over the casting, and if he okayed Brasselle for the role, it would seem the rest of us haven't much qualification for quibbling about it."
