= Sky Full of Moon =

1952 film by Norman Foster

- Directed by: Norman Foster
- Written by: Norman Foster
- Produced by: Sidney Franklin
- Starring: Carleton Carpenter; Keenan Wynn; Jan Sterling
- Cinematography: Ray June
- Edited by: Fredrick Y. Smith
- Music by: Paul Sawtell
- Production company: Metro-Goldwyn-Mayer
- Distributed by: Metro-Goldwyn-Mayer
- Release date: December 12, 1952
- Running time: 72 minutes
- Country: United States
- Language: English
- Budget: $385,000
- Box office: $443,000

Sky Full of Moon is a 1952 American Western film directed by Norman Foster and starring Carleton Carpenter, Keenan Wynn, and Jan Sterling. It was produced and distributed by Metro-Goldwyn-Mayer.

== Plot ==
Easy-going cowpoke Harley "Tumbleweed" Williams travels to Las Vegas, where a rodeo is about to be held. Tumbleweed wants to win the prize money in bronc riding, but for the moment he needs $8 to have the full $50 entry fee for the event.

Looking for work, Tumbleweed goes to the Lucky 13 casino, run by a man named Al, where he meets the lovely Dixie Delmar, who dispenses change to the gambling customers. Tumbleweed ends up winning $40 on a slot machine, then runs up his winnings to $175 before getting greedy and losing it all.

Dixie says she's been unable to find a job as a dancer and wants to return home to Kansas, but before she goes, she tries to coax Tumbleweed into using a drill that will enable them to get at the money inside the casino's slots. Tumbleweed wins a $150 jackpot honestly, but Al turns up and sees the drill.

On the lam, Dixie tries to steal Tumbleweed's hatful of silver dollars. But her conscience gets the better of her, and before leaving, she calls Al to tell him that Tumbleweed won the money fair and square. Tumbleweed returns to Vegas in time to enter the rodeo, but he loses the bronco riding contest and ends up broke, right back where he started.

== Cast ==
- Carleton Carpenter as Tumbleweed
- Jan Sterling as Dixie
- Keenan Wynn as Al
- Elaine Stewart as Billie
- Robert Burton as Customer
- Emmett Lynn as Otis
- Douglass Dumbrille as Rodeo Official
- Jonathan Cott as Balladeer / Manager

== Reception ==
According to MGM records, the film earned $362,000 in the US and Canada and $81,000 elsewhere, making a loss to the studio of $135,000.
