= Elaine Stewart (actress) =

American actress and model (1930–2011)

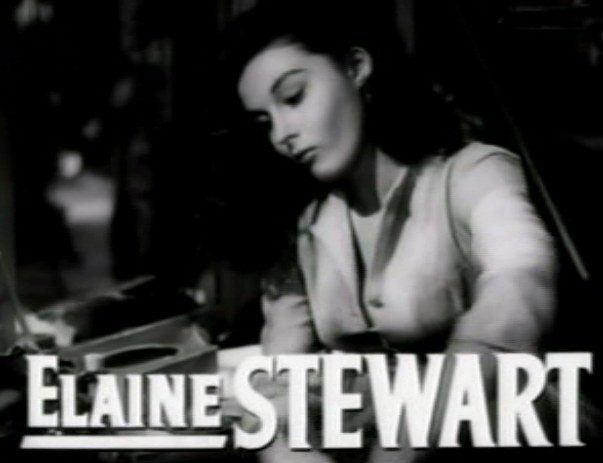
- Stewart in The Bad and the Beautiful (1952)
- Born: Elsy Henrietta Maria Steinberg; May 31, 1930; Montclair, New Jersey, U.S.
- Died: June 27, 2011 (aged 81); Beverly Hills, California, U.S.
- Occupations: Actress; model
- Years active: 1952–1976
- Spouses: Bill Carter (m. 1961; div. 1963) Merrill Heatter (m. 1964)
- Children: 2

Elaine Stewart (May 31, 1930 – June 27, 2011) was an American actress and model.

== Early life ==
Stewart was born Elsy Henrietta Maria Steinberg in Montclair, New Jersey, one of five children of Ulrich E. Steinberg, a police sergeant, and Maria Hedwig (Hänssler). Her father, who was largely Frisian, was from Aurich, Niedersachsen, and her mother was from Göppingen, Baden-Württemberg. She attended Montclair High School.

== Career ==
=== Modeling ===
She changed her name, and signed a contract with the Conover modeling agency while still a teenager. Stewart made her debut by winning Miss See in See Magazine in 1952, with measurements 34–25–36. She was in many magazines such as Playboy and Photoplay.

=== Film ===
Soon after, movie producer Hal Wallis offered her $200 a week to play a nurse in the Dean Martin-Jerry Lewis comedy Sailor Beware. She beat out hundreds of young models in 1952 to earn a photo layout in See Magazine, winning the title of “Miss See.” Stewart had a supporting role in The Bad and the Beautiful (1952), as Lila, a starlet who has a romantic fling with a producer played by Kirk Douglas.

She was featured as Julie, the love interest of Sgt Ryan, played by Richard Widmark, in Take the High Ground! (1953) and co-starred with Mickey Rooney in a 1953 comedy, A Slight Case of Larceny. She appeared in other films, such as Brigadoon, Night Passage, Code Two, The Rise and Fall of Legs Diamond, and The Adventures of Hajji Baba. Stewart had a small but key role, as Anne Boleyn, in 1953's Young Bess.

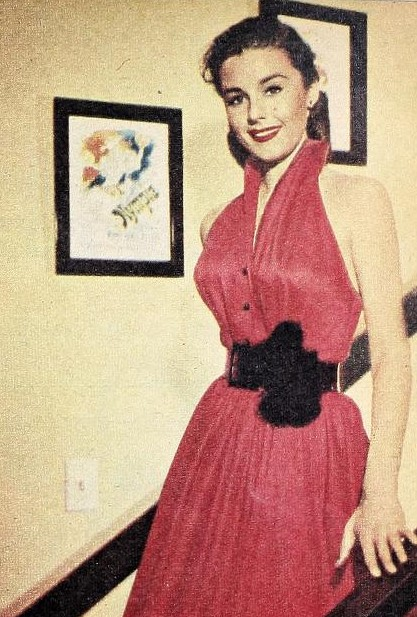
Elaine Stewart in 1955

She co-starred with Jeff Chandler in the film noir The Tattered Dress (1957), with Victor Mature in the western Escort West (1958) and shared top billing with John Derek in a 1958 adventure film, High Hell, before turning to television.

=== Television ===
Stewart guest-starred in TV series such as Bat Masterson and Burke's Law, both starring Gene Barry. In her last acting appearance on TV, she played Irene Grey in the Perry Mason episode "The Case of the Capering Camera" in 1964. Stewart was a co-hostess on two 1970s game shows, Gambit with Wink Martindale and the nighttime edition of High Rollers with Alex Trebek, both produced by her husband, Merrill Heatter.

== Personal life ==
In 1961, she married actor Bill Carter. They divorced in 1964, and she married television producer Merrill Heatter on December 31, 1964. They had a son, Stewart, and a daughter, Gabrielle.

== Death ==
Stewart died at her home in Beverly Hills, California on June 27, 2011, at the age of 81. She was survived by her husband and two children. She was cremated.

== Filmography ==
Year	Title	Role	Notes
1952	Sailor Beware	Lt. Saunders	Uncredited
1952	Singin' in the Rain	Lady-in-Waiting	Uncredited
1952	You for Me	Girl in Club Car	
1952	Everything I Have Is Yours	Showgirl	
1952	Desperate Search	Stewardess	
1952	Sky Full of Moon	Billie - the Change Girl	
1952	The Bad and the Beautiful	Lila	
1953	Rogue's March	Nurse	Uncredited
1953	Code Two	Jane Anderson	
1953	Young Bess	Anne Boleyn	
1953	A Slight Case of Larceny	Beverly Ambridge	
1953	Take the High Ground!	Julie Mollison	
1954	Brigadoon	Jane Ashton	
1954	The Adventures of Hajji Baba	Princess Fakzia	
1956	Meet Me in Las Vegas	Elaine Stewart	Uncredited
1957	The Tattered Dress	Charleen Reston	
1957	Night Passage	Verna Kimball	
1958	High Hell	Lenore Davidson	
1959	Escort West	Beth Drury	
1960	The Rise and Fall of Legs Diamond	Monica Drake	
1961	The Seven Revenges	Tamara	
1961	Most Dangerous Man Alive	Carla Angelo	
1962	Peccati d'estate	Costanza	
