= Willard Sage =

Canadian-American actor (1922–1974)

- Sage in Death Valley Days, 1969
- Born: James Willard Sage; August 13, 1922; London, Ontario, Canada
- Died: March 17, 1974 (aged 51); Sherman Oaks, California, U.S.
- Occupations: Film and television actor
- Years active: 1951–1974
- Children: 1

James Willard Sage (August 13, 1922 – March 17, 1974) was a Canadian-American film and television actor.

== Biography ==
Born in London, Ontario. Sage began his career in 1951, where he appeared in the film The Butler's Night Off, playing the role of a crook. He performed in New York where Sage played a lead role in the stage play Hobson's Choice. Sage played the role of the killer Chester Davitt in the 1954 film Dragnet. He then played the role of Tom Tattle in the 1955 film It's a Dog's Life. He played the role of Jonathan Tatum in the 1956 film The Brass Legend.

Sage guest-starred in television programs including Perry Mason, Room 222, Gunsmoke, Bonanza, Tales of Wells Fargo, Peter Gunn, The Man from U.N.C.L.E., Hogan's Heroes, Death Valley Days, Land of the Giants, 12 O'Clock High, The Deputy, Rawhide, The Life and Legend of Wyatt Earp, My Three Sons, The Virginian, Star Trek: The Original Series and Tales of the Texas Rangers. He played the role of Tom Hodges in the 1962 film That Touch of Mink. He also played the role of Orson Roark in the 1963 film For Love or Money. His last credit was from the detective television series Banacek.

Sage died on March 17, 1974, in Sherman Oaks, California, at the age of 51.

== Filmography ==
=== Film ===
Year	Title	Role	Notes
1951	The Butler's Night Off	A Crook	
1953	Niagara	Motorcycle Cop (uncredited)	Film noir thriller film
1954	Dragnet	Chester Davitt	
1955	Blackboard Jungle	Radio Announcer (voice) (uncredited)	
1955	The Tender Trap	Director	Comedy film
1955	It's a Dog's Life	Tom Tattle	
1956	Gaby	Train Announcer (voice) (uncredited)	Drama film
1956	The Rack	Announcer (uncredited)	
1956	Somebody Up There Likes Me	Captain Earl Woodhope (uncredited)	
1956	The Brass Legend	Jonathan Tatum	
1959	Timbuktu	Major Leroux (uncredited)	
1960	The Great Imposter	Lt. Thornton	
1961	Lover Come Back	Wallace, Liquor Industry Representative (uncredited)	
1962	That Touch of Mink	Tom Hodges	
1963	For Love or Money	Orson Roark	
1970	Colossus: the Forbin Project	Dr. Blake	science fiction thriller film
1970	Scream, Evelyn, Scream!	The Drunk	
1972	Dirty Little Billy	Henry McCarty	Western biographical film

=== Television ===
Year	Title	Role	Notes
1952	The Big Story	Rolf K. Mills	Episode: "Case of the Unhappy Wife"
1954	Stories of the Century	Army Officer (uncredited)	Episode: "Clay Allison"
1960	Perry Mason	Tony Gilbert	S4, E7: "The Case of the Clumsy Clown"
1965	Gunsmoke	Corly Watts	Episode “Chief Joseph"
1968	Star Trek: The Original Series	Thann	Episode: "The Empath"
1969-1970	Room 222	Mr. Knott; Mr. Ross	Episode: "El Genio"; Episode: "Funny Money"
1966-1971	The Virginian	Charlie Davis; Clete; Barrows	Episode: "Harvest of Strangers"; Episode: "The Fortress"; Episode: "The Town Killer"
1972	Emergency!	Dr. Eccles	Episode: "Decision"
