= List of American films of 1955 =

More than 254 American feature films were released in 1955.

The United Artists film Marty won the Academy Award for Best Picture for 1955.

== A–B ==
Title	Director	Cast	Genre	Notes
5 Against the House	Phil Karlson	Kim Novak, Brian Keith, Guy Madison	Crime	Columbia
Abbott and Costello Meet the Keystone Kops	Charles Lamont	Abbott and Costello, Mack Sennett, Lynn Bari	Comedy	Universal
Abbott and Costello Meet the Mummy	Charles Lamont	Abbott and Costello, Marie Windsor, Michael Ansara	Horror comedy	Abbott and Costello's last Universal film
African Manhunt	Seymour Friedman	Myron Healey, Karin Booth, John Kellogg	Adventure	Republic
Ain't Misbehavin'	Edward Buzzell	Rory Calhoun, Piper Laurie, Jack Carson	Musical	Universal
Air Strike	Cy Roth	Richard Denning, Gloria Jean, Don Haggerty	Drama	Lippert Pictures
All That Heaven Allows	Douglas Sirk	Jane Wyman, Rock Hudson, Agnes Moorehead	Romance	Universal
The Americano	William Castle	Glenn Ford, Cesar Romero, Ursula Thiess	Western	RKO
An Annapolis Story	Don Siegel	John Derek, Diana Lynn, Kevin McCarthy	Drama	Allied Artists
Angela	Dennis O'Keefe	Mara Lane, Rossano Brazzi, Dennis O'Keefe	Drama	20th Century Fox. Co-production with Italy
Apache Ambush	Fred F. Sears	Bill Williams, Richard Jaeckel, Movita Castaneda	Western	Columbia
Apache Woman	Roger Corman	Joan Taylor, Lloyd Bridges, Lance Fuller	Western	AIP
Artists and Models	Frank Tashlin	Dean Martin, Jerry Lewis, Shirley MacLaine, Dorothy Malone	Comedy	Paramount; 14th Martin and Lewis film
At Gunpoint	Alfred L. Werker	Fred MacMurray, Dorothy Malone, Walter Brennan	Western	Allied Artists
Bad Day at Black Rock	John Sturges	Spencer Tracy, Robert Ryan, Walter Brennan	Western Drama	MGM; 3 Oscar nominations; based on story Bad Day at Hondo
Battle Cry	Raoul Walsh	Van Heflin, Aldo Ray Mona Freeman, Tab Hunter	War	Warner Bros.; based on the Leon Uris novel
Battle Taxi	Herbert L. Strock	Sterling Hayden, Arthur Franz, Marshall Thompson	War drama	United Artists
Bedevilled	Mitchell Leisen	Anne Baxter, Steve Forrest, Simone Renant	Crime	MGM
Bengazi	John Brahm	Richard Conte, Victor McLaglen, Mala Powers	Adventure	RKO
The Big Bluff	Lee Wilder	Martha Vickers, John Bromfield, Robert Hutton	Crime	United Artists
The Big Combo	Joseph H. Lewis	Cornel Wilde, Richard Conte, Brian Donlevy	Film noir	Allied Artists
Big House, U.S.A.	Howard W. Koch	Broderick Crawford, William Talman, Charles Bronson	Crime	United Artists
The Big Knife	Robert Aldrich	Jack Palance, Ida Lupino, Rod Steiger, Shelley Winters	Drama	United Artists; story by Clifford Odets
Blackboard Jungle	Richard Brooks	Glenn Ford, Louis Calhern, Anne Francis	Drama	MGM; 4 Oscar nominations
Blood Alley	William A. Wellman	John Wayne, Lauren Bacall, Anita Ekberg	Adventure	Warner Bros.
Bowery to Bagdad	Edward Bernds	Leo Gorcey, Huntz Hall, Eric Blore	Comedy	Allied Artists
Bride of the Monster	Ed Wood	Bela Lugosi, Tor Johnson, Loretta King	Science fiction	Independent
Bring Your Smile Along	Blake Edwards	Frankie Laine, Constance Towers, Keefe Brasselle	Comedy	Columbia
A Bullet for Joey	Lewis Allen	Edward G. Robinson, George Raft, Audrey Totter	Film noir	United Artists

== C–D ==
Title	Director	Cast	Genre	Notes
Canyon Crossroads	Alfred L. Werker	Richard Basehart, Phyllis Kirk, Stephen Elliott	Western	United Artists
Captain Lightfoot	Douglas Sirk	Rock Hudson, Barbara Rush, Jeff Morrow	Period drama	Universal
Carolina Cannonball	Charles Lamont	Judy Canova, Andy Clyde, Sig Ruman	Comedy	Republic
Cell 2455, Death Row	Fred F. Sears	William Campbell, Kathryn Crosby, Vince Edwards	Film noir	Columbia
Chicago Syndicate	Fred F. Sears	Dennis O'Keefe, Abbe Lane, Paul Stewart	Film noir	Columbia
Chief Crazy Horse	George Sherman	Victor Mature, Suzan Ball, John Lund	Western	Universal
City of Shadows	William Witney	Victor McLaglen, Kathleen Crowley, Anthony Caruso	Crime drama	Republic
The Cobweb	Vincente Minnelli	Richard Widmark, Gloria Grahame, Lauren Bacall, Charles Boyer	Drama	MGM
Conquest of Space	Byron Haskin	Walter Brooke, Mickey Shaughnessy, Eric Fleming	Sci-fi	Paramount
Count Three and Pray	George Sherman	Van Heflin, Joanne Woodward, Philip Carey	Western	Columbia
The Court-Martial of Billy Mitchell	Otto Preminger	Gary Cooper, Rod Steiger, Charles Bickford, Elizabeth Montgomery	Drama, Biography	Warner Bros.
Crashout	Lewis R. Foster	William Bendix, William Talman, Arthur Kennedy	Film noir	
Creature with the Atom Brain	Edward L. Cahn	Richard Denning, Angela Stevens, Michael Granger	Sci-fi	Columbia
The Crooked Web	Nathan Juran	Frank Lovejoy, Mari Blanchard, Richard Denning	Film noir	Columbia
Cross Channel	R. G. Springsteen	Wayne Morris, Yvonne Furneaux, Patrick Allen	Crime	Republic
Cult of the Cobra	Francis D. Lyon	Faith Domergue, Richard Long, Marshall Thompson	Sci-fi	Universal
Daddy Long Legs	Jean Negulesco	Fred Astaire, Leslie Caron, Terry Moore	Musical	20th Century Fox
The Dark Avenger	Henry Levin	Errol Flynn, Joanne Dru, Yvonne Furneaux	Adventure	20th Century Fox
Day the World Ended	Roger Corman	Richard Denning, Adele Jergens	Sci-fi	AIP
Desert Sands	Lesley Selander	Ralph Meeker, Marla English, J. Carrol Naish	Adventure	United Artists
The Desperate Hours	William Wyler	Humphrey Bogart, Fredric March, Gig Young, Martha Scott	Film noir	Paramount; remade in 1990
Devil Goddess	Spencer G. Bennet	Johnny Weissmuller, Angela Stevens, William Tannen	Adventure	Columbia
Dial Red O	Daniel B. Ullman	Bill Elliott, Helene Stanley, Keith Larsen	Crime	Allied Artists
Double Jeopardy	R. G. Springsteen	Rod Cameron, Gale Robbins, Allison Hayes	Drama	Republic
Duel on the Mississippi	William Castle	Lex Barker, Patricia Medina, Craig Stevens	Western	Columbia

== E–H ==
Title	Director	Cast	Genre	Notes
East of Eden	Elia Kazan	Julie Harris, James Dean, Raymond Massey	Drama	Warner Bros. Based on John Steinbeck novel; Oscar for Van Fleet
The End of the Affair	Edward Dmytryk	Deborah Kerr, Van Johnson, John Mills	Drama	Columbia. Based on Graham Greene novel; remade in 1999
Escape to Burma	Allan Dwan	Barbara Stanwyck, Robert Ryan, David Farrar	Adventure	RKO
The Eternal Sea	John H. Auer	Sterling Hayden, Alexis Smith, Dean Jagger	War	Republic
The Far Country	Anthony Mann	James Stewart, Walter Brennan, Ruth Roman, Corinne Calvet	Western	Universal
The Far Horizons	Rudolph Maté	Fred MacMurray, Charlton Heston, Donna Reed	Western	Paramount
Female Jungle	Bruno VeSota	Lawrence Tierney, Kathleen Crowley, Jayne Mansfield	Film noir	AIP
Female on the Beach	Joseph Pevney	Joan Crawford, Jeff Chandler, Jan Sterling	Film noir	Universal
The Fighting Chance	William Witney	Julie London, Rod Cameron, Taylor Holmes	Drama	Republic
Finger Man	Harold D. Schuster	Frank Lovejoy, Forrest Tucker, Peggie Castle	Film noir	Allied Artists
Fort Yuma	Lesley Selander	Peter Graves, Joan Vohs, John Hudson	Western	United Artists
Foxfire	Joseph Pevney	Jane Russell, Jeff Chandler, Dan Duryea	Drama	Universal
Francis in the Navy	Arthur Lubin	Donald O'Connor, Martha Hyer, Clint Eastwood	Comedy	Universal; 6th of series
The Gamma People	John Gilling	Paul Douglas, Eva Bartok, Leslie Phillips	Sci-fi	Columbia
Gentlemen Marry Brunettes	Richard Sale	Jane Russell, Jeanne Crain, Alan Young	Musical	United Artists
The Girl in the Red Velvet Swing	Richard Fleischer	Ray Milland, Joan Collins, Farley Granger	Drama	20th Century Fox
The Girl Rush	Robert Pirosh	Rosalind Russell, Fernando Lamas, Gloria DeHaven	Comedy	Paramount
The Glass Slipper	Charles Walters	Leslie Caron, Michael Wilding, Elsa Lanchester	Musical	MGM
Good Morning, Miss Dove	Henry Koster	Jennifer Jones, Robert Stack, Robert Douglas	Drama	20th Century Fox
The Gun That Won the West	William Castle	Dennis Morgan, Paula Raymond, Richard Denning	Western	Columbia
Guys and Dolls	Joseph L. Mankiewicz	Marlon Brando, Frank Sinatra, Jean Simmons, Vivian Blaine	Musical	MGM; based on 1950 stage musical; 4 Oscar nominations
Headline Hunters	William Witney	Rod Cameron, Julie Bishop, Ben Cooper	Crime	Republic
Hell's Horizon	Tom Gries	John Ireland, Marla English, Hugh Beaumont	War	Columbia
Hell's Island	Phil Karlson	John Payne, Mary Murphy, Francis L. Sullivan	Film noir	Paramount Pictures
High Society	William Beaudine	Leo Gorcey, Huntz Hall, Amanda Blake	Comedy	Allied Artists
Hit the Deck	Roy Rowland	Ann Miller, Jane Powell, Debbie Reynolds, Tony Martin	Musical	MGM; based on 1927 stage musical
Hold Back Tomorrow	Hugo Haas	John Agar, Cleo Moore, Frank DeKova	Drama	Universal
House of Bamboo	Samuel Fuller	Robert Ryan, Robert Stack, Shirley Yamaguchi	Drama	20th Century Fox
How to Be Very, Very Popular	Nunnally Johnson	Betty Grable, Sheree North, Bob Cummings	Comedy	20th Century Fox; final film role for Grable

== I–L ==
Title	Director	Cast	Genre	Notes
I Cover the Underworld	R. G. Springsteen	Sean McClory, Joanne Jordan, Ray Middleton	Crime	Republic
I Died a Thousand Times	Stuart Heisler	Jack Palance, Shelley Winters, Lori Nelson	Crime drama	Warner Bros. Remake of High Sierra
I'll Cry Tomorrow	Daniel Mann	Susan Hayward, Richard Conte, Eddie Albert	Drama	MGM
Illegal	Lewis Allen	Edward G. Robinson, Nina Foch, Jayne Mansfield	Film noir	Warner Bros.
The Indian Fighter	Andre DeToth	Kirk Douglas, Elsa Martinelli, Walter Matthau	Western	United Artists
Interrupted Melody	Curtis Bernhardt	Glenn Ford, Eleanor Parker, Roger Moore	Drama	MGM
It Came from Beneath the Sea	Robert Gordon	Kenneth Tobey, Faith Domergue, Donald Curtis	Science fiction	Columbia
It's Always Fair Weather	Gene Kelly	Gene Kelly, Cyd Charisse, Dan Dailey, Michael Kidd	Musical	MGM; 2 Oscar nominations
It's a Dog's Life	Herman Hoffman	Edmund Gwenn, Dean Jagger, Jarma Lewis	Drama	MGM
Jail Busters	William Beaudine	Leo Gorcey, Huntz Hall, Barton MacLane	Comedy	Allied Artists
Joe MacBeth	Ken Hughes	Jean Simmons, Paul Douglas, Bonar Colleano	Drama	Columbia
Jump into Hell	David Butler	Kurt Kasznar, Patricia Blair, Peter van Eyck	War	Warner Bros.
Jungle Moon Men	Charles S. Gould	Johnny Weissmuller, Jean Byron, Myron Healey	Adventure	Columbia
Jupiter's Darling	George Sidney	Esther Williams, Howard Keel, George Sanders	Musical	MGM
The Kentuckian	Burt Lancaster	Burt Lancaster, Dianne Foster, Diana Lynn	Adventure	United Artists
Kentucky Rifle	Carl K. Hittleman	Chill Wills, Cathy Downs, Lance Fuller	Western	Independent
Killer's Kiss	Stanley Kubrick	Frank Silvera, Irene Kane, Felice Orlandi	Drama	United Artists
The King's Thief	Robert Z. Leonard	Ann Blyth, David Niven, George Sanders	Adventure	MGM
Kismet	Vincente Minnelli	Howard Keel, Ann Blyth, Dolores Gray	Musical	MGM
Kiss Me Deadly	Robert Aldrich	Ralph Meeker, Albert Dekker, Gaby Rodgers, Cloris Leachman	Film noir	United Artists; from Mickey Spillane novel
Kiss of Fire	Joseph M. Newman	Jack Palance, Barbara Rush, Martha Hyer	Western	Universal
Lady and the Tramp	Clyde Geronimi, Wilfred Jackson	Peggy Lee, Barbara Luddy, Larry Roberts	Animation	Disney
Lady Godiva of Coventry	Arthur Lubin	Maureen O'Hara, George Nader, Victor McLaglen	Historical	Universal
Land of the Pharaohs	Howard Hawks	Jack Hawkins, Joan Collins, Dewey Martin	Adventure	Warner Bros.
Las Vegas Shakedown	Sidney Salkow	Dennis O'Keefe, Coleen Gray, Charles Winninger	Crime	Allied Artists
The Last Command	Frank Lloyd	Sterling Hayden, Anna Maria Alberghetti, Ernest Borgnine	War western	Republic
The Last Frontier	Anthony Mann	Victor Mature, Guy Madison, Robert Preston, Anne Bancroft	Western	Columbia
A Lawless Street	Joseph H. Lewis	Randolph Scott, Angela Lansbury, Warner Anderson	Western	Columbia
Lay That Rifle Down	Charles Lamont	Judy Canova, Robert Lowery, Richard Deacon	Comedy	Republic
The Left Hand of God	Edward Dmytryk	Humphrey Bogart, Gene Tierney, Lee J. Cobb	Drama	20th Century Fox
A Life at Stake	Paul Guilfoyle	Angela Lansbury, Keith Andes, Douglas Dumbrille	Film noir	Independent
A Life in the Balance	Harry Horner	Ricardo Montalbán, Anne Bancroft, Lee Marvin	Thriller	20th Century Fox
The Long Gray Line	John Ford	Tyrone Power, Maureen O'Hara, Donald Crisp	Drama	Columbia
The Looters	Abner Biberman	Rory Calhoun, Julie Adams, Ray Danton	Western	Universal
Love Is a Many-Splendored Thing	Henry King	Jennifer Jones, William Holden, Torin Thatcher	Drama	20th Century Fox; 8 Oscar nominations
Love Me or Leave Me	Charles Vidor	Doris Day, James Cagney, Cameron Mitchell	Musical biography	MGM; story of Ruth Etting; 8 Oscar nominations
Lucy Gallant	Robert Parrish	Jane Wyman, Charlton Heston, Claire Trevor	Drama	Paramount

== M–N ==
Title	Director	Cast	Genre	Notes
Ma and Pa Kettle at Waikiki	Lee Sholem	Marjorie Main, Percy Kilbride, Lori Nelson	Comedy	Universal 7th of series
Magic Fire	William Dieterle	Alan Badel, Valentina Cortese, Rita Gam, Yvonne De Carlo	Biography	story of Richard Wagner
The Magnificent Matador	Budd Boetticher	Maureen O'Hara, Anthony Quinn, Richard Denning, Lola Albright	Drama	20th Century Fox
Mambo	Robert Rossen	Silvana Mangano, Michael Rennie, Shelley Winters	Drama	Paramount. Co-produced with Italy
A Man Alone	Ray Milland	Ray Milland, Mary Murphy, Raymond Burr	Western	Republic
A Man Called Peter	Henry Koster	Richard Todd, Jean Peters, Jill Esmond	Drama	20th Century Fox
The Man from Bitter Ridge	Jack Arnold	Mara Corday, Lex Barker, Stephen McNally	Western	Universal
The Man from Laramie	Anthony Mann	James Stewart, Arthur Kennedy, Cathy O'Donnell	Western	Columbia
The Man with the Golden Arm	Otto Preminger	Frank Sinatra, Eleanor Parker, Kim Novak	Drama	United Artists; from Nelson Algren novel; 3 Oscar nominations
Man with the Gun	Richard Wilson	Robert Mitchum, Jan Sterling, Karen Sharpe	Western	United Artists
Man Without a Star	King Vidor	Kirk Douglas, Jeanne Crain, Claire Trevor, Richard Boone	Western	Universal
Many Rivers to Cross	Roy Rowland	Robert Taylor, Eleanor Parker, Victor McLaglen	Western	MGM
The Marauders	Gerald Mayer	Dan Duryea, Keenan Wynn, Jarma Lewis	Western	MGM
Marty	Delbert Mann	Ernest Borgnine, Betsy Blair, Karen Steele	Drama	United Artists. Based on teleplay; Oscars for Best Picture, Director, Actor
The McConnell Story	Gordon Douglas	Alan Ladd, June Allyson, James Whitmore	Biography	Warner Bros.
Mister Roberts	John Ford	Henry Fonda, James Cagney, Jack Lemmon, William Powell	War	Warner Bros. Oscar for Lemmon; based on 1946 novel and 1948 play
Moonfleet	Fritz Lang	George Sanders, Stewart Granger, Joan Greenwood	Drama	MGM
Murder Is My Beat	Edgar G. Ulmer	Barbara Payton, Paul Langton, Robert Shayne	Film noir	Allied Artists
My Sister Eileen	Richard Quine	Betty Garrett, Jack Lemmon, Janet Leigh	Musical	Columbia; Remake of 1942 film
The Naked Dawn	Edgar G. Ulmer	Arthur Kennedy, Betta St. John, Eugene Iglesias	Western	Universal
The Naked Street	Maxwell Shane	Farley Granger, Anne Bancroft, Anthony Quinn	Drama	United Artists
New Orleans Uncensored	William Castle	Beverly Garland, Arthur Franz, Helene Stanton	Film noir	Columbia
New York Confidential	Russell Rouse	Broderick Crawford, Richard Conte, Marilyn Maxwell,	Film noir	Warner Bros.
The Night Holds Terror	Andrew L. Stone	Vince Edwards, John Cassavetes, Hildy Parks	Drama	Columbia
The Night of the Hunter	Charles Laughton	Robert Mitchum, Shelley Winters, Lillian Gish	Suspense	United Artists; based on novel by Davis Grubb
No Man's Woman	Franklin Adreon	Marie Windsor, John Archer, Patric Knowles	Crime	Republic
No Place to Hide	Josef Shaftel	Marsha Hunt, David Brian	Thriller	Allied Artists
Not as a Stranger	Stanley Kramer	Olivia de Havilland, Robert Mitchum, Frank Sinatra	Drama	United Artists

== O–R ==
Title	Director	Cast	Genre	Notes
Oklahoma!	Fred Zinnemann	Gordon MacRae, Shirley Jones, Rod Steiger, Gloria Grahame	Musical	RKO. Based on stage musical by Rodgers and Hammerstein; 4 Oscar nominations
One Desire	Jerry Hopper	Anne Baxter, Rock Hudson, Julie Adams	Romantic drama	Universal
Outlaw Treasure	Oliver Drake	Adele Jergens, Johnny Carpenter, Glenn Langan	Western	AIP
Paris Follies of 1956	Leslie Goodwins	Forrest Tucker, Margaret Whiting, Martha Hyer	Musical	Allied Artists
Pearl of the South Pacific	Allan Dwan	Virginia Mayo, Dennis Morgan, David Farrar	Adventure	RKO
Pete Kelly's Blues	Jack Webb	Jack Webb, Janet Leigh, Edmond O'Brien	Drama	Warner Bros.
The Phantom from 10,000 Leagues	Dan Milner	Kent Taylor, Cathy Downs, Michael Whalen	Science fiction	AIP
The Phenix City Story	Phil Karlson	John McIntire, Richard Kiley, Kathryn Grant	Drama	Allied Artists
Picnic	Joshua Logan	William Holden, Kim Novak, Betty Field, Rosalind Russell	Drama	Columbia; based on play by William Inge; 6 Oscar nominations
Pirates of Tripoli	Felix E. Feist	Paul Henreid, Patricia Medina, Paul Newlan	Adventure	Columbia
Prince of Players	Philip Dunne	Richard Burton, John Derek, Raymond Massey	Historical	20th Century Fox
The Private War of Major Benson	Jerry Hopper	Charlton Heston, Julie Adams, William Demarest	Comedy	Universal
The Prodigal	Richard Thorpe	Lana Turner, Edmund Purdom, Louis Calhern	Drama	MGM
The Purple Mask	H. Bruce Humberstone	Tony Curtis, Colleen Miller, Angela Lansbury	Adventure	Universal
Queen Bee	Ranald MacDougall	Joan Crawford, Betsy Palmer, John Ireland	Drama	Columbia
The Racers	Henry Hathaway	Kirk Douglas, Bella Darvi, Gilbert Roland	Sports drama	20th Century Fox
Rage at Dawn	Tim Whelan	Randolph Scott, Forrest Tucker, Mala Powers	Western	RKO
The Rains of Ranchipur	Jean Negulesco	Lana Turner, Richard Burton, Fred MacMurray, Michael Rennie	Drama	20th Century Fox; remake of 1939 film The Rains Came
Rebel Without a Cause	Nicholas Ray	James Dean, Natalie Wood, Sal Mineo	Drama	Warner Bros.; 3 Oscar nominations
Revenge of the Creature	Jack Arnold	John Agar, Lori Nelson, John Bromfield	Science fiction	Universal
The Road to Denver	Joseph Kane	John Payne, Mona Freeman, Lee J. Cobb	Western	Republic
Robbers' Roost	Sidney Salkow	Richard Boone, George Montgomery, Bruce Bennett	Western	United Artists
The Rose Tattoo	Daniel Mann	Anna Magnani, Burt Lancaster, Marisa Pavan	Drama	Paramount. From Tennessee Williams play; Oscar for Magnani; 8 nominations
Run for Cover	Nicholas Ray	James Cagney, Viveca Lindfors, John Derek	Western	Paramount
Running Wild	Abner Biberman	William Campbell, Mamie van Doren, Keenan Wynn, Kathleen Case	Film noir	Universal

== S–T ==
Title	Director	Cast	Genre	Notes
Sabaka	Frank Ferrin	Boris Karloff, Reginald Denny, June Foray	Adventure	United Artists
Santa Fe Passage	William Witney	John Payne, Faith Domergue, Rod Cameron	Western	Republic
The Scarlet Coat	John Sturges	Cornel Wilde, Michael Wilding, Anne Francis	Historical	MGM
The Sea Chase	John Farrow	Lana Turner, John Wayne, David Farrar	Adventure	Warner Bros.
The Second Greatest Sex	George Marshall	Jeanne Crain, Kitty Kallen, Mamie van Doren, Kathleen Case	Western	Universal
Seminole Uprising	Earl Bellamy	George Montgomery, Karin Booth, William Fawcett	War western	Columbia
Seven Angry Men	Charles Marquis Warren	Raymond Massey, Jeffrey Hunter, Debra Paget	Drama	Allied Artists
Seven Cities of Gold	Robert D. Webb	Richard Egan, Jeffrey Hunter, Rita Moreno	Adventure	20th Century Fox
The Seven Little Foys	Melville Shavelson	Bob Hope, James Cagney, Milly Vitale	Comedy biography	Paramount; story of Eddie Foy
The Seven Year Itch	Billy Wilder	Tom Ewell, Marilyn Monroe, Evelyn Keyes	Comedy	20th Century Fox; based on 1952 play
Shack Out on 101	Edward Dein	Terry Moore, Frank Lovejoy, Lee Marvin	Film noir	Allied Artists
Shotgun	Lesley Selander	Sterling Hayden, Yvonne De Carlo, Zachary Scott	Western	Allied Artists
The Shrike	José Ferrer	José Ferrer, June Allyson, Joy Page	Drama	Universal
Sincerely Yours	Gordon Douglas	Liberace, Joanne Dru, Dorothy Malone	Drama	Warner Bros.
Six Bridges to Cross	Joseph Pevney	Tony Curtis, George Nader, Julie Adams	Film noir	Universal
Smoke Signal	Jerry Hopper	Dana Andrews, Piper Laurie, Rex Reason	Western	Universal
So This Is Paris	Richard Quine	Tony Curtis, Gloria DeHaven, Corinne Calvet	Musical	Universal
Soldier of Fortune	Edward Dmytryk	Clark Gable, Susan Hayward, Michael Rennie	Adventure	20th Century Fox
Son of Sinbad	Ted Tetzlaff	Dale Robertson, Sally Forrest, Vincent Price	Adventure	RKO
Special Delivery	John Brahm	Joseph Cotten, Eva Bartok, René Deltgen	Comedy	Columbia
The Spoilers	Jesse Hibbs	Anne Baxter, Jeff Chandler, Rory Calhoun	Western	Universal; Remake of 1942 film
Spy Chasers	Edward Bernds	Leo Gorcey, Huntz Hall, Sig Ruman	Comedy	Allied Artists
The Square Jungle	Jerry Hopper	Tony Curtis, Patricia Crowley, Ernest Borgnine	Film noir	Universal
Storm Fear	Cornel Wilde	Cornel Wilde, Jean Wallace, Lee Grant	Film noir	United Artists
Strange Lady in Town	Mervyn LeRoy	Greer Garson, Dana Andrews, Cameron Mitchell	Western	Warner Bros.
Stranger on Horseback	Jacques Tourneur	Joel McCrea, Miroslava Stern, Nancy Gates	Western	United Artists
Strategic Air Command	Anthony Mann	James Stewart, June Allyson, Frank Lovejoy	Drama	Paramount
Sudden Danger	Hubert Cornfield	Bill Elliott, Beverly Garland, Tom Drake	Suspense	Allied Artists
Summertime	David Lean	Katharine Hepburn, Rossano Brazzi, Isa Miranda	Drama	United Artists; 2 Oscar nominations
Swamp Women	Roger Corman	Beverly Garland, Marie Windsor, Carole Mathews	Science fiction	Woolner
Tall Man Riding	Lesley Selander	Randolph Scott, Dorothy Malone, Peggie Castle	Western	Warner Bros.
The Tall Men	Raoul Walsh	Clark Gable, Jane Russell, Robert Ryan	Western	20th Century Fox
Tarantula	Jack Arnold	Leo G. Carroll, John Agar, Mara Corday	Science fiction	Universal
Target Zero	Harmon Jones	Richard Conte, Peggie Castle, Charles Bronson	Drama	Warner Bros.
Tarzan's Hidden Jungle	Harold D. Schuster	Gordon Scott, Vera Miles, Peter van Eyck	Adventure	RKO
Teen-Age Crime Wave	Fred F. Sears	Sue England, Tommy Cook, James Bell	Crime	Columbia
The Tender Trap	Charles Walters	Frank Sinatra, Debbie Reynolds, Celeste Holm	Romantic comedy	MGM; based on the 1954 play
Tennessee's Partner	Allan Dwan	John Payne, Ronald Reagan, Rhonda Fleming	Western	RKO
Ten Wanted Men	H. Bruce Humberstone	Randolph Scott, Jocelyn Brando, Richard Boone	Western	Columbia
Texas Lady	Tim Whelan	Claudette Colbert, Barry Sullivan, Ray Collins	Western	RKO
This Island Earth	Joseph M. Newman	Rex Reason, Jeff Morrow, Faith Domergue	Science fiction	Universal; inspired Mystery Science Theater 3000: The Movie
Three for the Show	H. C. Potter	Betty Grable, Jack Lemmon, Gower Champion	Musical	Columbia
Three Stripes in the Sun	Richard Murphy	Aldo Ray, Philip Carey, Dick York	War	Columbia
Tight Spot	Phil Karlson	Ginger Rogers, Edward G. Robinson, Brian Keith	Film noir	Columbia
Timberjack	Joseph Kane	Sterling Hayden, Vera Ralston, Adolphe Menjou	Western	Republic
To Catch a Thief	Alfred Hitchcock	Cary Grant, Grace Kelly, John Williams	Suspense	Paramount; 3 Oscar nominations
To Hell and Back	Jesse Hibbs	Audie Murphy, Marshall Thompson, Charles Drake	Biographical	Universal
Top Gun	Ray Nazarro	Sterling Hayden, Karin Booth, William Bishop	Western	United Artists
Top of the World	Lewis R. Foster	Dale Robertson, Evelyn Keyes, Frank Lovejoy	Adventure	United Artists
Toughest Man Alive	Sidney Salkow	Dane Clark, Lita Milan, Anthony Caruso	Drama	Allied Artists
The Treasure of Pancho Villa	George Sherman	Rory Calhoun, Shelley Winters, Gilbert Roland	Western	RKO
Treasure of Ruby Hills	Frank McDonald	Zachary Scott, Carole Mathews, Barton MacLane	Western	Allied Artists
Trial	Mark Robson	Glenn Ford, Katy Jurado, Arthur Kennedy	Drama	MGM
The Trouble with Harry	Alfred Hitchcock	Shirley MacLaine, John Forsythe, Jerry Mathers	Comedy	Paramount; first film for MacLaine
The Twinkle in God's Eye	George Blair	Mickey Rooney, Coleen Gray, Hugh O'Brian	Western	Republic

== U–Z ==
Title	Director	Cast	Genre	Notes
Unchained	Hall Bartlett	Barbara Hale, Elroy Hirsch, Chester Morris	Drama	Warner Bros.
Underwater!	John Sturges	Jane Russell, Richard Egan, Gilbert Rowland	Adventure	RKO
Untamed	Henry King	Tyrone Power, Susan Hayward, Richard Egan,	Adventure	20th Century Fox
The Violent Men	Rudolph Maté	Glenn Ford, Barbara Stanwyck, Edward G. Robinson	Western	Columbia
The Vanishing American	Joseph Kane	Audrey Totter, Scott Brady, Forrest Tucker	Western	Republic; Remake of 1925 film
The View from Pompey's Head	Philip Dunne	Richard Egan, Dana Wynter, Cameron Mitchell	Drama	20th Century Fox
Violent Saturday	Richard Fleischer	Victor Mature, Richard Egan, Lee Marvin	Crime	20th Century Fox
The Virgin Queen	Henry Koster	Bette Davis, Richard Todd, Joan Collins	Historical	20th Century Fox
We're No Angels	Michael Curtiz	Humphrey Bogart, Peter Ustinov, Aldo Ray	Comedy	Paramount
White Feather	Robert D. Webb	Robert Wagner, Debra Paget, John Lund	Western	20th Century Fox
Wichita	Jacques Tourneur	Joel McCrea, Vera Miles, Lloyd Bridges	Western	Allied Artists
Wiretapper	Dick Ross	Bill Williams, Douglas Kennedy, Stanley Clements	Western	Independent
Women's Prison	Lewis Seiler	Ida Lupino, Jan Sterling, Cleo Moore, Audrey Totter, Phyllis Thaxter, Howard Duff	Film noir	Columbia
Yellowneck	R. John Hugh	Lin McCarthy	Drama	Republic
You're Never Too Young	Norman Taurog	Dean Martin, Jerry Lewis, Diana Lynn	Comedy	13th Martin and Lewis film; Paramount

== Documentaries ==
Title	Director	Cast	Genre	Notes
The Battle of Gettysburg	Herman Hoffman		Documentary	Nominated for Oscars for Best Documentary, Short Subject and Best Short Subject, Two-reel
Cinerama Holiday	Philippe De Lacy	John Marsh, Betty Marsh	Documentary	
The Pied Piper of Cleveland	Arthur Cohen	Bill Randle	Musical	

== Serials ==
Title	Director	Cast	Genre	Notes
The Adventures of Captain Africa	Spencer Gordon Bennet	John Hart, Rick Vallin	Serial	Columbia
King of the Carnival	Franklin Adreon	Harry Lauter, Fran Bennett	Serial	Republic
Panther Girl of the Kongo	Franklin Adreon	Phyllis Coates	Serial	Republic

== See also ==
- 1955 in the United States
