= Running Wild (1955 film) =

1955 film by Abner Biberman

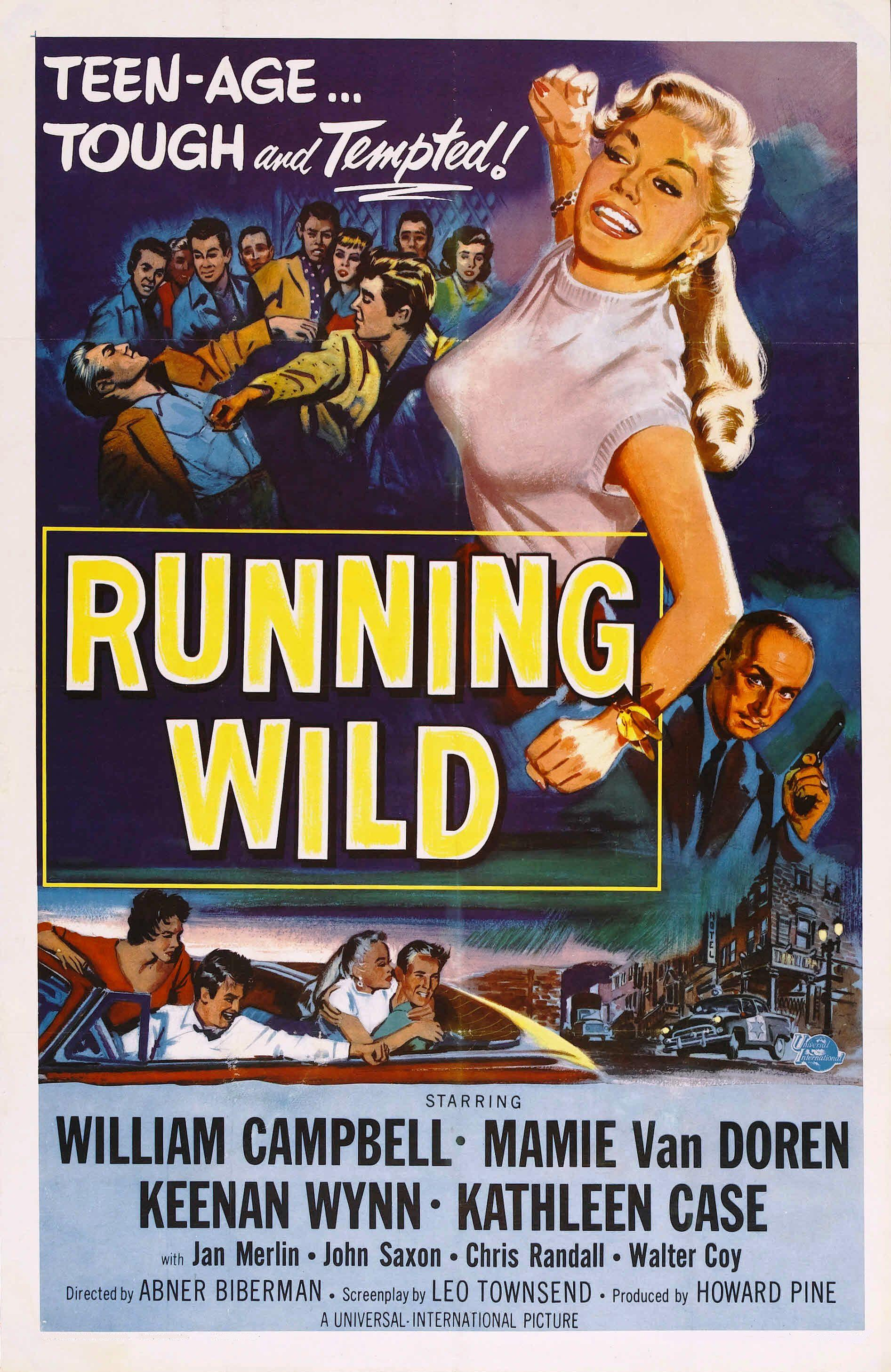
- Theatrical release poster by Reynold Brown
- Directed by: Abner Biberman
- Screenplay by: Leo Townsend
- Based on: Girl in the Cage; 1954 novel by Ben Benson
- Produced by: Howard Pine
- Starring: William Campbell; Mamie Van Doren; Keenan Wynn; Kathleen Case; John Saxon
- Cinematography: Ellis W. Carter
- Edited by: Edward Curtiss; Ray Snyder
- Color process: Black and white
- Production company: Universal Pictures
- Distributed by: Universal Pictures
- Release dates: November 11, 1955 (New York City); December 1, 1955 (United States)
- Running time: 81 minutes
- Country: United States
- Language: English

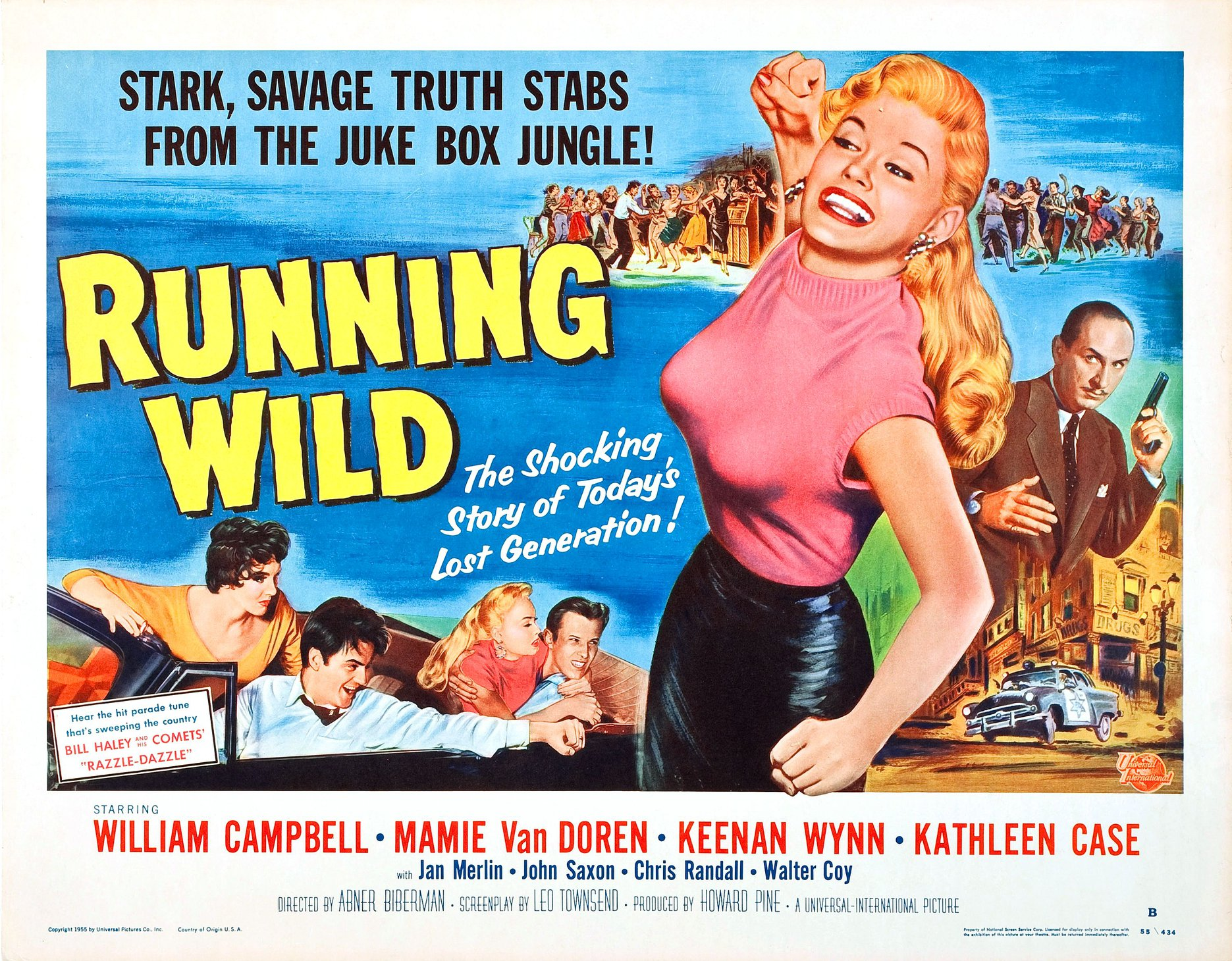

Running Wild is a 1955 American film noir crime film directed by Abner Biberman and starring William Campbell, Mamie Van Doren, Keenan Wynn, and Kathleen Case. The film was often paired with Tarantula as part of a double feature.

== Plot ==
Ralph Barton is a young rookie cop who goes undercover to infiltrate an auto-theft ring run by juvenile delinquents.

== Cast ==
- William Campbell as Ralph Barton
- Mamie Van Doren as Irma Bean
- Keenan Wynn as Ken Osanger
- Kathleen Case as Leta Novak
- Jan Merlin as Scotty Cluett
- John Saxon as Vince Pomeroy
- Walter Coy as Lieutenant Ed Newpole
- Grayce Mills as Osanger's Mother (as Grace Mills)
- Chris Randall Arkie Nodecker
- Michael Fox as Delmar Graves
- Will J. White as State Trooper
- Richard Castle as Herbie
- Otto Waldis as Leta's Father

== Production ==
It was the first significant role for John Saxon, put under contract to Universal.

The film is notable for a sequence where Van Doran and others dance to a recording of "Razzle-Dazzle" by Bill Haley and His Comets. This came not long after the film Blackboard Jungle had featured "Rock Around the Clock" and actually predated films such as The Girl Can't Help It and Rock Around the Clock which were among the first rock and roll musicals.

== Reception ==
Variety called it "okay".

== See also ==
- List of American films of 1955
