= Fort Yuma (film) =

1955 film

- Film poster
- Directed by: Lesley Selander
- Screenplay by: Danny Arnold
- Story by: Danny Arnold
- Produced by: Howard W. Koch
- Starring: Peter Graves; Joan Vohs; John Hudson; Joan Taylor
- Cinematography: Gordon Avil
- Edited by: John F. Schreyer
- Music by: Paul Dunlap
- Color process: Technicolor
- Production company: Bel-Air Productions
- Distributed by: United Artists
- Release date: October 4, 1955
- Running time: 79 minutes
- Country: United States
- Language: English

Fort Yuma is a 1955 American Western film directed by Lesley Selander and starring Peter Graves, Joan Vohs, John Hudson and Joan Taylor.

== Plot ==
When word reaches a U.S. Cavalry command that an Apache chief's son is planning an attack on Fort Yuma, a column of soldiers led by Lt. Ben Keegan is sent to deliver ammunition and supplies. Keegan has a longstanding hatred of the Indians and even resents that his chief scout, Sgt. Jonas, is an Apache himself.

Accompanying them is missionary Melanie Crown, an educated and enlightened woman from the East who despises prejudice and strongly believes everyone can live together in harmony, and the sergeant's sister, Francesca, whose mutual attraction with Keegan is complicated, considering his views.

The company is attacked, its soldiers being picked off one by one until only Keegan and Jonas and the two women remain alive. Apaches steal the dead soldiers' uniforms and intend to approach the fort in disguise. Fighting off two Apache attackers, Keegan kills one and hangs the other, against the appeals of the others.

Francesca is killed by an Apache, dying in Keegan's arms, which brings about a change in his attitudes. He and the others reach the fort just as the disguised Apaches' real identities are discovered. A fierce battle, saber vs. tomahawk, ensues between Keegan and the Apache chief's son, man to man. Keegan survives and experiences remorse for his beliefs, while Melanie and Jonas intend to set an example for the others how to co-exist in peace.

== Cast ==
- Peter Graves as Lt. Ben Keegan
- Joan Vohs as Melanie Crown
- John Hudson as Sgt. Jonas
- Joan Taylor as Francesca
- William 'Bill' Phillips as Sgt. Major Milo Hallock (as Wm. {Bill} Phillips)
- James O'Hara as Cpl. Taylor (as James Liburn)
- Abel Fernandez as Mangas
- Addison Richards as Gen. Crook

== Production ==
The film was edited before release with many violent scenes being excised.

The film was originally denied a seal from the Production Code Administration. Geoffrey Shurlock told producer Howard W. Koch that it contained "sadism and excessive gruesomeness". To get a seal, Koch allegedly reduced the number of killings from 24 to 10, although in fact there are still considerably more than 10 onscreen deaths in the amended version. Removed were scenes where a man is spread-eagled and torn apart by horses; an arrow impaling a hand to wood; and a scene depicting the bodies of hanged Indians, swaying from tree limbs.

Parts of the film were shot in Kanab movie fort, Kanab Creek, and Kanab Canyon.

== See also ==
- List of American films of 1955
