= Here's Hollywood =

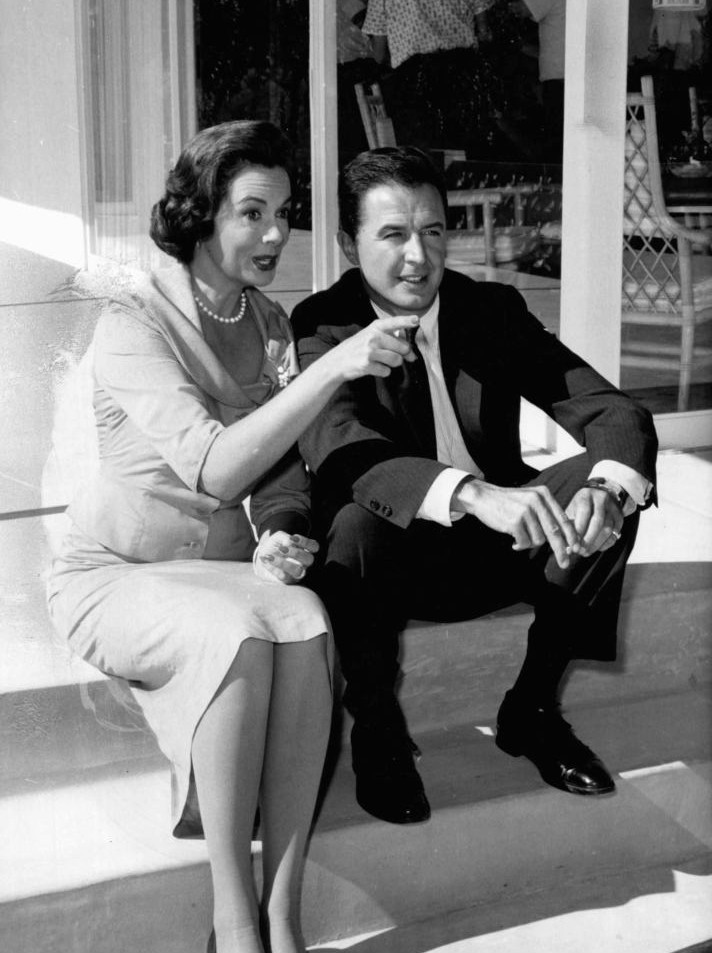
- Joanne Jordan and Dean Miller, 1960.
- Presented by: Dean Miller; Joanne Jordan; Helen O'Connell; Jack Linkletter
- Country of origin: United States
- No. of seasons: 2

Production
- Producer: Jess Oppenheimer
- Running time: 30 minutes
- Production company: Desilu

Original release
- Network: NBC
- Release: September 26, 1960 – December 28, 1962

Here's Hollywood is an American celebrity interview program which aired on weekday afternoons on NBC at 4:30 Eastern time from September 26, 1960, to December 28, 1962.

When the program began, Joanne Jordan and Dean Miller were co-hosts. They recorded interviews with celebrities around Hollywood "in stars' homes, bowling alleys, studios, on golf courses — anywhere they can catch the pretty people at work or play."

Celebrities who appeared on the show included Stella Stevens, Steve Allen, Jayne Meadows, Mike Romanoff, Perry Como, and Gogi Grant.

== Production notes ==
The program was a Desilu Production. Jack Linkletter, son of Art Linkletter, conducted some of the interviews in 1962.
