= Big Leaguer =

1953 film by Robert Aldrich

- Theatrical release poster
- Directed by: Robert Aldrich
- Screenplay by: Herbert Baker
- Story by: John McNulty; Lou Morheim
- Produced by: Matthew Rapf
- Starring: Edward G. Robinson; Vera-Ellen; Jeff Richards; Richard Jaeckel; William Campbell
- Cinematography: William C. Mellor
- Edited by: Ben Lewis
- Music by: Alberto Colombo
- Production company: Metro-Goldwyn-Mayer
- Distributed by: Loew's, Inc.
- Release date: August 19, 1953
- Running time: 71 minutes
- Country: United States
- Language: English
- Budget: $498,000
- Box office: $559,000

Big Leaguer is a 1953 American biographical sports drama film directed by Robert Aldrich in his directorial debut, and starring Edward G. Robinson, Vera-Ellen, Jeff Richards, Richard Jaeckel, William Campbell and Carl Hubbell. It is based on the career of professional baseball player-turned-New York Giants manager and trainer Hans Lobert (Robinson), though the film's storyline is fictional. The film was produced by Metro-Goldwyn-Mayer and released on August 19, 1953.

== Plot ==
Hans Lobert runs a training camp in Florida for Major League Baseball's New York Giants. Every year, he evaluates the 18- to 22-year-old to pick for a minor league contract. All have goals and abilities, but the elimination reduces them to a specific number who will receive the $150-a-month contract.

Lobert's niece comes down from the home office in New York and finds herself attracted to one of the players, the tall, quiet Adam Polachuk, from Pittston, Pennsylvania. Polachuk, the best prospect at third base, is trying to earn a spot on the team without his father knowing about it. His father, who knows nothing about baseball, thinks Adam is attending school. His father finds out about Adam's attempt to make the Giants just before the best of the recruits square off against the Brooklyn Dodgers' rookie squad.

The elder Polachuk is persuaded by manager Lobert to let his son play in the game before taking him home. Polachuk is the star of the game for the Giants both offensively and defensively as the Giants rally to win the game.

== Cast ==
- Edward G. Robinson as Hans Lobert
- Vera-Ellen as Christy
- Jeff Richards as Adam Polachuk
- Richard Jaeckel as Bobby Bronson
- William Campbell as Julie Davis
- Carl Hubbell as himself
- Paul Langton as Brian McLennan
- Lalo Rios as Chuy Aguilar
- Bill Crandall as Tippy Mitchell
- Frank Ferguson as Wally Mitchell
- John McKee as Dale Alexander
- Mario Siletti as Mr. Polachuk
- Donald 'Chippie' Hastings as Little Joe Polachuk
- Robert Calwell as Pomfret
- Al Campanis as himself
- Bob Trocolor as himself
- Tony Ravis as himself
- Bing Russell

=== Casting notes ===
Prior to his acting career, Jeff Richards was a Minor League Baseball player for the Portland Beavers and the Salem Senators. Carl Hubbell was the real-life New York Giants' pitcher from 1928 to 1943, and was inducted into the Hall Of Fame in 1947.

== Production ==
The film was one of a series of low budget films made at MGM. According to Robert Aldrich, Louis B. Mayer "had wanted to put the sons of the guys who helped him form Metro into production work; and they had this thing called the sons of the pioneers... Three or four guys whose fathers had been helpful in first forming Metro."

Mayer left MGM in 1951 but Dore Schary kept alive the idea, in part because of the success of a low budget unit at MGM which he ran in the early 1940s. In January 1952 he announced the formation of a new production unit under the supervision of Charles Schnee. It included several sons of executives who had helped establish MGM, Matthew Raft (son of Harry Rapf), Arthur Loew (son of Marcus Loew), and Sidney Franklin Jnr (son of Sidney Franklin). Other producers were Hayes Goetz, Henry Berman (brother of Pandro S. Berman), and Sol Fielding. The idea was to make ten to fifteen films a year.

Big Leaguer was based on an original story by John McNulty, who sold it to producer Matthew Rapf at MGM.

Herbert Butler wrote a script and in November 1952 MGM announced they would make the film under the Charles Schnee unit. Robinson signed later that month, the first film he had shot at MGM since Our Vines Have Tender Grapes. Filming would not begin until March 1953 to take advantage of spring training.

Robert Aldrich had worked at Enterprise Studios as an assistant director and met Herbert Baker on So This is New York. Baker recommended Aldrich as director because he had worked in television and "knew athletes". "They were looking for 'bright young guys' who'd been on the firing line for a while, someone they thought they could give an opportunity to and who knew what he was doing because they didn't", said Aldrich. Aldrich was signed to direct in January, 1953.

Jeff Richards, who was cast a baseball player, had been a baseball player in real life.

Spring training filming took place at Melbourne, Florida with the real-life New York Giants. The film was shot in Cape Canaveral in 17 days "out of nowhere" said Aldrich.

Aldrich remembered star Edward G. Robinson as "a marvellous actor and a brilliant man but he was not physically co ordinated. He would walk to first base and trip over the home plate."

== Reception ==
According to MGM records the film earned $467,000 in the US and Canada and $92,000 elsewhere, resulting in a loss of $163,000.

A Los Angeles Times reviewer called it a "cheery little opus" and praised Vera-Ellen's performance, saying she "surprises pleasantly with her straight acting effort."

Aldrich said "The world wasn't waiting for that picture. It was a picture about the New York Giants and Metro had the foresight to open it in Brooklyn, so you can't have expected it to do very well. Nothing much came out of it." In a 2004 interview, he recalled "It was not a personal film of my status at the time.... I feel the film was good but not indicative of what I wanted to express in the motion picture medium."

== See also ==
- List of baseball films
