= Many Rivers to Cross (film) =

1955 film by Roy Rowland

- Theatrical Film Poster
- Directed by: Roy Rowland
- Screenplay by: Harry Brown and Guy Trosper
- Based on: Many Rivers to Cross; 1951 story in Argosy by Steve Frazee
- Produced by: Jack Cummings
- Starring: Robert Taylor; Eleanor Parker
- Cinematography: John Seitz, A.S.C.
- Edited by: Ben Lewis
- Music by: Cyril J. Mockridge
- Production company: Metro-Goldwyn-Mayer
- Distributed by: Metro-Goldwyn-Mayer
- Release date: February 4, 1955
- Running time: 94 minutes
- Country: United States
- Language: English
- Budget: $1,683,000
- Box office: $3,832,000

Many Rivers to Cross is a 1955 American colonial Western film shot in CinemaScope directed by Roy Rowland and starring Robert Taylor and Eleanor Parker.

== Plot ==
Kentucky, the late 18th century: A traveling preacher's coming to town, but Miles Henderson is upset because Cissie Crawford seems reluctant to marry him. She seems more interested in a handsome trapper who has just arrived in the territory, Bushrod Gentry.

Cissie's life is saved by Bushrod after she is attacked by Shawnee tribesmen, but he is a confirmed bachelor who lets her down gently. While traveling on his own, Bushrod is wounded by the Indians and in danger until another woman, Mary Stuart Cherne, saves his life.

Feeling love at first sight, Mary takes him home to her Scottish-born father, Cadmus, and their Indian servant, Sandak, to heal. Her longtime suitor Luke Radford is unhappy about this interloper.

Bushrod again declines a chance to settle down, whereupon an angry Mary ends up keeping him there against his will. With her four brothers keeping a gun on him, Bushrod is forced to marry Mary.

He punches a justice of the peace and gets 30 days in jail. Another trapper, Esau Hamilton, has a sick child whose life Bushrod ends up saving. He slips away and intends to be on his own again, but Bushrod comes across Indians who are trying to scalp Mary. He saves her life this time, then accepts his fate as a man in love...

== Cast ==
- Robert Taylor as Bushrod Gentry
- Eleanor Parker as Mary Stuart Cherne
- Victor McLaglen as Cadmus Cherne
- Josephine Hutchinson as Mrs. Cherne
- Jeff Richards as Fremont Cherne
- Russ Tamblyn as Shields Cherne
- John Hudson as Hugh Cherne
- Russell Johnson as Banks Cherne
- Alan Hale, Jr. as Luke Radford
- Ralph Moody as Sandak
- James Arness as Esau Hamilton
- Rhys Williams as Lige Blake
- Sig Ruman as Spectacle man
- Rosemary DeCamp as Lucy Hamilton
- Abel Fernandez as Slangoh

Uncredited (in order of appearance)
Tom Fadden	Rafe
Richard Garrick	Preacher Ellis
Darryl Hickman	Miles Henderson
Dorothy Adams	Mrs. Crawford
Louis Jean Heydt	Noah Crawford
Betty Lynn	Cissie Crawford
Morris Ankrum	Mr. Emmett
Marjorie Wood	Mrs. Emmett
William Haade	Constable
Russell Simpson	Man with constable
Robert Bice	Member of punishment group
Ethan Laidlaw	Member of punishment group
Hank Patterson	Bartender
George Robotham	Indian

== Opening dedication ==
"We respectfully dedicate our story
to the frontier women of America
who helped their men settle the
Kentucky wilderness. They were
gallant and courageous, and without
their aggressive cooperation – few of
us would be around to see this picture."

== Production ==
MGM bought the rights to a story by Steve Frazee published in Argosy magazine. Jack Cummings was assigned to produce. Janet Leigh was originally intended to be the female lead.

== Reception ==
According to MGM records the film earned $2,084,000 in the US and Canada and $1,748,000 elsewhere, resulting in a profit of $533,000.

The review in the February 24, 1955 issue of The New York Times panned the film: "as inane, raucous and clumsy an attempt at Western satire as has snaked out of the Hollywood brush in a long time. Photographed in color and CinemaScope, for no discernible reason, it co-stars Eleanor Parker and Robert Taylor. The story tells how a husband-craving tomboy of the Kentucky frontier literally exhausts a bold frontiersman into marriage and, after what seems years later, true love.The heavy-handed writing, directing and acting, especially that of Miss Parker and Victor McLaglen, as a hillbilly patriarch, all but nudges the customer into the aisle, in poking fun at buckskin horseplay, shotgun weddings and, as a climax, Shawnee warfare. James Arness and Rosemary DeCamp are effective in the picture's one thoughtful interlude, and Mr. Taylor looks miserable about the whole dismal cartoon."

== See also ==
- List of American films of 1955
