= Abel Fernandez =

American actor (1930–2016)

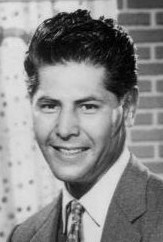
- Fernandez in The Untouchables, 1960.
- Born: Abel Gonzalez Fernandez; July 14, 1930; East Los Angeles, California, U.S.
- Died: May 3, 2016 (aged 85); Whittier, California, U.S.
- Resting place: Riverside National Cemetery
- Occupation: Actor
- Years active: 1953–2002
- Children: 4

Abel Gonzalez Fernandez (July 14, 1930 – May 3, 2016) was an American actor who played in movies from 1953 to 2002. He was best known for his role as Federal Agent William "Bill" Youngfellow on the 1959–1963 ABC Television series The Untouchables.

== Biography ==
Fernandez was born in Los Angeles, California, on July 14, 1930. His mother was a Yaqui Native American woman, and his father was a Native Mexican man. He was the youngest of a large American family and lost his mother at birth. He attended Belmont High School in Los Angeles, and at the age of 16, enlisted in the United States Army and became a paratrooper with the 11th Airborne Division.

While there he won the title, Middleweight Boxing Champ of the Asiatic Forces. In 1950, as an amateur, he won the light heavyweight title in the Los Angeles Golden Gloves competition. After his discharge, he became a professional boxer from 1950 to 1953. During that time he studied acting and began appearing in films.

In 1964, Fernandez was sentenced to 90 days in jail after pleading guilty to failing to file state tax returns in California for four years. Additionally, he had to pay $4,750 in taxes, plus penalties, and be on probation for four years.

== Film and TV ==
Fernandez' film debut came in Second Chance (1953) in which his character, Rivera, fought a boxing match against star Robert Mitchum.

He was the only cast member from the original Untouchables lineup in the series' 1959 "Scarface Mob" pilot, other than Robert Stack himself, to be cast for the series. His character is based on that of William Jennings Gardner, American Indian member of the real-life Untouchables federal squad.

Fernandez has also appeared in dozens of TV and film roles in series such as Daniel Boone, Bonanza, Time Tunnel, Gunsmoke, Batman, Wagon Train, The Virginian, Have Gun – Will Travel, and Marcus Welby M.D., as well as theatrical films such as Fort Yuma, Target Zero, Second Chance (1953) with Robert Mitchum, Alaska Seas starring Robert Ryan (also 1953), Rose Marie with Fernando Lamas (1954), The Last Wagon (1956), Pork Chop Hill starring Gregory Peck (1959), Madigan with Richard Widmark (1968), Quicksilver (1986), and many more. He also appeared in the ABC TV series The Adventures of Rin Tin Tin (with Lee Aaker) as an Apache warrior.

He occasionally produced theatrical shows for disadvantaged children.

== Death ==
Fernandez died on May 3, 2016, from lung cancer at a hospital in Whittier, California, at the age of 85. He had four children. A US Army veteran, he was buried at Riverside National Cemetery in Riverside, California.

== Partial filmography ==
- Second Chance (1953) – Rivera
- Alaska Seas (1954) – Ricci—tall crewman
- Rose Marie (1954) – Indian Warrior (uncredited)
- Many Rivers to Cross (1955) – Slangoh
- Strange Lady in Town (1955) – Apache (uncredited)
- The Last Command (1955) – Mexican Soldier (uncredited)
- Devil Goddess (1955) – Teinusi
- Fort Yuma (1955) – Mangas
- Target Zero (1955) – Pvt. Geronimo (uncredited)
- The Harder They Fall (1956) – Chief Firebird (uncredited)
- The Last Wagon (1956) – Apache Medicine Man (uncredited)
- The Tijuana Story (1957) – Policeman (uncredited)
- Decision at Sundown (1957) – Pete (uncredited)
- Pork Chop Hill (1959) – Kindley
- Steve Canyon (1959) – several episodes as Featherstone
- Have Gun - Will Travel (1960) - S2 E19 "The Monster" - Prison Guard
- The Age of Violence (1964) – Gangster
- Rio Conchos (1964) – Mexican at Corral (uncredited)
- Apache Uprising (1965) – Young Apache Chief
- The Appaloosa (1966) – Mexican Farmer (uncredited)
- Dead Heat on a Merry-Go-Round (1966) – Aztec Airlines Attendant (uncredited)
- Madigan (1968) – Detective Rodriguez
- Topaz (1969) – Cuban Guerrilla Fighter (uncredited)
- Quicksilver (1986) – Guyamo
- Buster's Bedroom (1991) – Dr. Jacoby (final film role)
