= Jeff Richards (actor, born 1924) =

American baseball player and actor

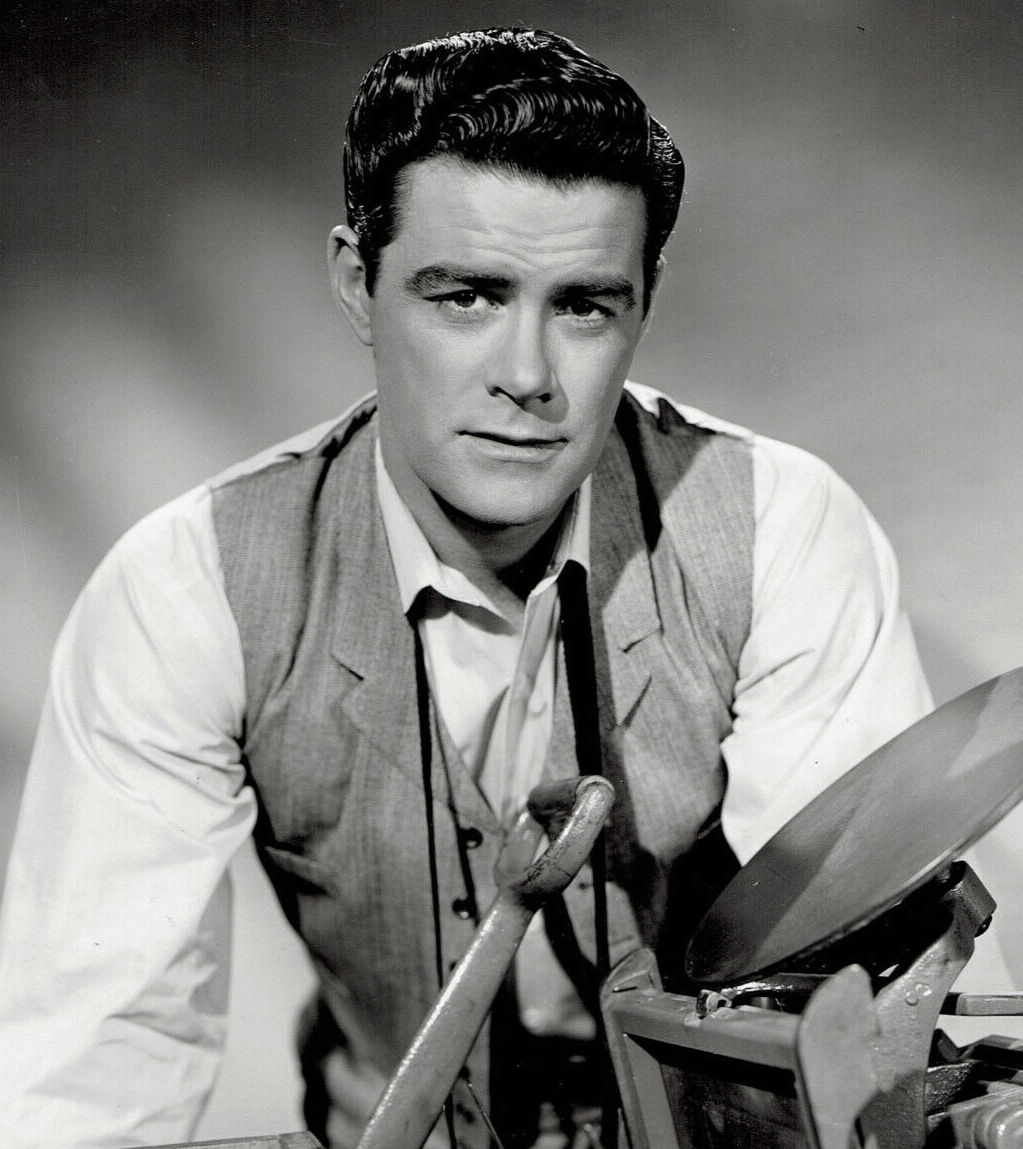
- Richards in Jefferson Drum, 1959
- Born: Richard Mansfield Taylor; November 1, 1924; Portland, Oregon, U.S.
- Died: July 28, 1989 (aged 64); San Bernardino, California, U.S.
- Resting place: Riverside National Cemetery, Riverside, California
- Occupation: Actor
- Years active: 1948–1966
- Spouses: Shirley Sibre (m. 1954; div. 1955) Vickie Taylor (m. 1955; div. 1959)

Jeff Richards (November 1, 1924 – July 28, 1989) was an American actor. He was sometimes credited as Dick Taylor and Richard Taylor.

He is best known for his role as Benjamin Pontipee in Seven Brides for Seven Brothers (1954). Following this performance, he tied with George Nader and Joe Adams for the Golden Globe for Most Promising Newcomer. Despite this, his acting career soon floundered.

== Early life and career ==
He was born Richard Mansfield Taylor in Portland, Oregon. Taylor joined the U.S. Navy during World War II and served until 1946. After, he signed with the Portland Beavers and was assigned to their farm team, the Salem Senators. After playing in Salem for two weeks, his baseball career came to an end due to a knee injury.

=== Early Acting Career ===
He then went to Hollywood to pursue a film career. His first roles included uncredited bits at Warner Bros in The Big Punch (1948), Johnny Belinda (1948), Fighter Squadron (1948) and The Girl from Jones Beach (1949).

At 20th Century Studios, he had small roles in Mother Is a Freshman (1949), and Cheaper by the Dozen (1950). He went to Columbia to make Kill the Umpire (1950), cast as "Richard Taylor". He played a baseball player and publicity said he used to play for Salem in the Western International League and that they had spent six weeks trying to cast the role.

=== MGM ===
He got a screen test at Metro-Goldwyn Mayer and the studio signed him to a contract and changed his name to Jeff Richards.

Richards had uncredited roles in The Strip (1951) with Mickey Rooney, The Tall Target (1951) with Dick Powell and Paula Raymond, and The People Against O'Hara (1951) with Spencer Tracy, and a bigger credited part in Angels in the Outfield (1951) as a baseball player. He was being sought to play Frank Merriwell.

Richards had small roles in Just This Once (1952) with Peter Lawford, The Sellout (1952) with Walter Pidgeon, Desperate Search (1952), The Bad and the Beautiful (1952) with Kirk Douglas, Above and Beyond (1952) with Jane Greer, and Battle Circus (1953) with Humphrey Bogart. He had a slightly bigger part in Code Two (1953) with Ralph Meeker.

=== Career peak ===
Richards had his first sizeable role, billed third as a ball player, in Big Leaguer (1954). Seagulls Over Sorrento (1954) was another decent sized role. Then Richards was the third lead in Seven Brides for Seven Brothers (1954), after Howard Keel and Jane Powell. It was a big hit and established him as a film name. MGM started to build him up as a star. Dore Schary, head of the studio, said the actor had "tremendous personal charm" and "looks like a great bet [to become a star], based on his reception til now."

MGM announced him as star of O'Kelley's Eclipse but it was not made. He was announced for Forbidden Planet but did not appear in the final film. Bar Sinister with Roger Moore was announced but not made.

Richards was one of Eleanor Parker's brothers in Many Rivers to Cross (1955) and was finally given a star part in the Western The Marauders (1955) playing a hero opposite Dan Duryea. He played the lead in the box-office flop It's a Dog's Life (1955) and had one of the male leads in the musical The Opposite Sex (1956) with June Allyson, Joan Collins, and Ann Sheridan.

The Marauders, It's a Dog's Life and The Opposite Sex all lost money and MGM began to lose enthusiasm for Richards. He began working on TV, guest starring in "Man with a Choice" for The Web (1957) and "The Other Side of the Curtain" for Suspicion.

Richards supported Glenn Ford in MGM's popular comedy Don't Go Near the Water (1957) but it was a relatively minor role. He lost out on the lead of Walk the Tightrope. In April 1957 he secured his release from the studio on the condition he repay $4,400 of his salary, later saying, “I wanted to be free to chart my own course. Right now, I’m interested in doing an adventure series on television.”

=== Post MGM ===
Richards guest starred on The Millionaire, and Schlitz Playhouse, then co-starred with Mamie Van Doren in the Warner Bros rodeo drama Born Reckless (1958).

In 1958, on television, Richards played the title role in the NBC western television series Jefferson Drum (1958–59), the story of a crusading journalist, with Eugene Martin portraying his young son. The series was cancelled after twenty-six episodes aired over two seasons.

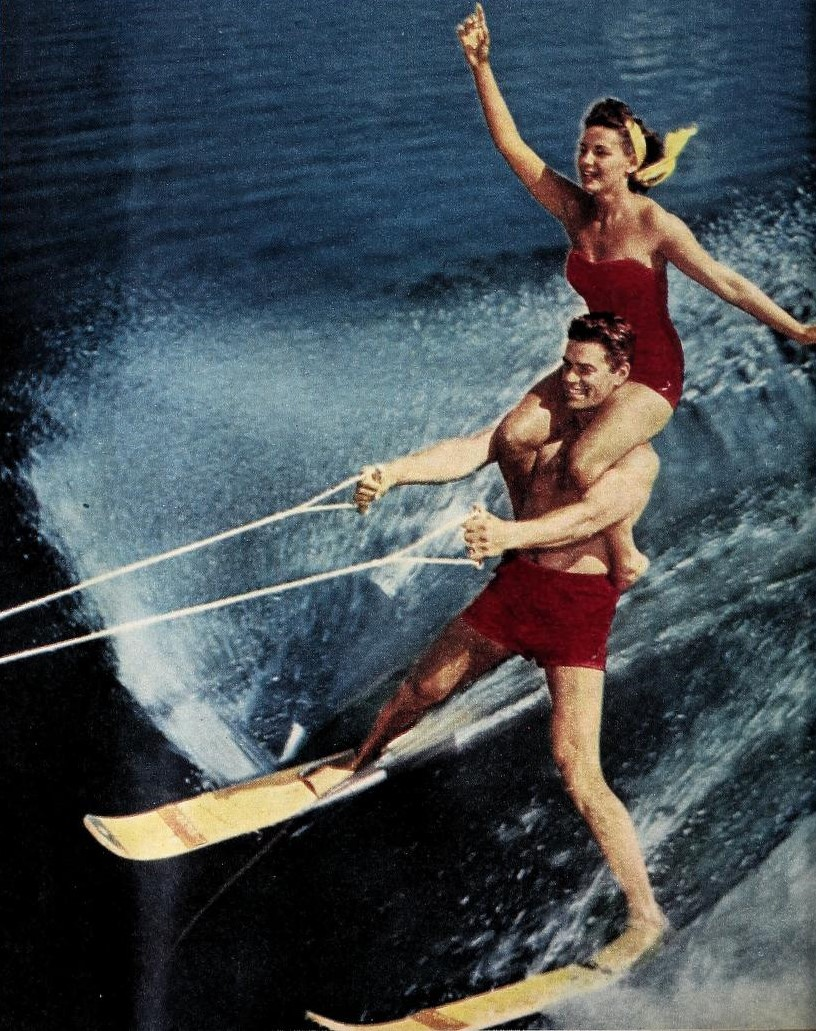
Jeff Richards with his bride Shirley Sibre (1954)

He also had the lead in Island of Lost Women (1959) made by Jaguar Productions. Richards signed a five-year contract with Jaguar to make two films a year but made no further films for them.

Richards guest-starred in Behind Closed Doors, Alcoa Theatre, Adventures in Paradise, and Laramie and played the role in 1961 of Jubal Evans in the episode "Incident of His Brother's Keeper" of the CBS western Rawhide.

Richards' last lead role was in the underwater adventure The Secret of the Purple Reef (1960). His last role was in 1966 as Kallen in the film Waco.

== Personal life ==
Richards married Shirley Sibre in 1954, but they were divorced the following year. He married Vickie Flaxman in 1955, and they had one child (a daughter born in 1957) before they divorced in 1959. She later married actor Van Williams.

Richards retired from acting and moved to San Bernardino County, where he lived in a trailer park and collected disability for the remainder of his life.

Jeff Richards died on July 28, 1989, aged 64, from acute respiratory failure. He is buried at Riverside National Cemetery in Riverside, California.

== Filmography ==
Year	Title	Role	Notes
1948	The Big Punch	Bit Role	Uncredited
1948	Johnny Belinda	Floyd McQuiggen	Uncredited
1948	Fighter Squadron	Captain	(scenes deleted)
1949	Mother Is a Freshman	Butch	Uncredited
1949	The Girl from Jones Beach	Lifeguard	Uncredited
1950	Cheaper by the Dozen	Bit Role	Uncredited
1950	Kill the Umpire	Bob Landon	
1951	The Tall Target	Philadelphia Police Officer	Uncredited
1951	The Strip	G.I. Ward Patient	Uncredited
1951	The People Against O'Hara	Wilson	Uncredited
1951	Angels in the Outfield	Dave Rothberg	
1952	Just This Once	Denham's Clerk	Uncredited
1952	The Sellout	Walter O. Hickby	
1952	Desperate Search	Ed	
1952	The Bad and the Beautiful	Studio Props Department Man	Uncredited
1952	Above and Beyond	Thomas Ferebee	
1953	Battle Circus	Lieutenant	
1953	Code Two	Harry Whenlon	
1953	Big Leaguer	Adam Polachuk	
1954	Crest of the Wave	Seaman D. 'Butch' Clelland (USN)	
1954	Seven Brides for Seven Brothers	Benjamin	
1955	Many Rivers to Cross	Fremont Cherne	
1955	The Marauders	Corey Everett	
1955	It's a Dog's Life	Patch McGill	
1956	Meet Me in Las Vegas	Jeff Richards	Uncredited
1956	The Opposite Sex	Buck Winston	
1957	Don't Go Near the Water	Lt. Ross Pendleton	
1958	Born Reckless	Kelly Cobb	
1959	Island of Lost Women	Mark Bradley	
1960	The Secret of the Purple Reef	Mark Christophe	
1966	Waco	Kallen	(final film role)

== Television ==
Year	Title	Role	Notes
1961	Rawhide	Jubal Evans	S3:E21, "Incident of His Brother's Keeper"

== Notes ==
- Clemens, Samuel (September 2022). "Born Reckless: The Story of Jeff Richards". Western Clippings. pp. 4–6.
