= The Cobweb (1955 film) =

1955 film by Vincente Minnelli

- Theatrical release poster
- Directed by: Vincente Minnelli
- Screenplay by: John Paxton additional dialogue by William Gibson
- Based on: The Cobweb by William Gibson
- Produced by: John Houseman; Jud Kinberg (associate producer)
- Starring: Richard Widmark; Lauren Bacall; Charles Boyer; Gloria Grahame
- Cinematography: George J. Folsey
- Edited by: Harold F. Kress
- Music by: Leonard Rosenman
- Distributed by: Metro-Goldwyn-Mayer
- Release date: July 15, 1955
- Running time: 124 minutes
- Country: United States
- Language: English
- Budget: $1,976,000
- Box office: $1,978,000

The Cobweb is a 1955 American Eastmancolor MGM drama film. It was directed by Vincente Minnelli and written by John Paxton with additional dialogue by William Gibson, based on the latter's 1954 novel of the same name. The film stars Richard Widmark, Lauren Bacall, Charles Boyer, and Gloria Grahame.

== Plot ==
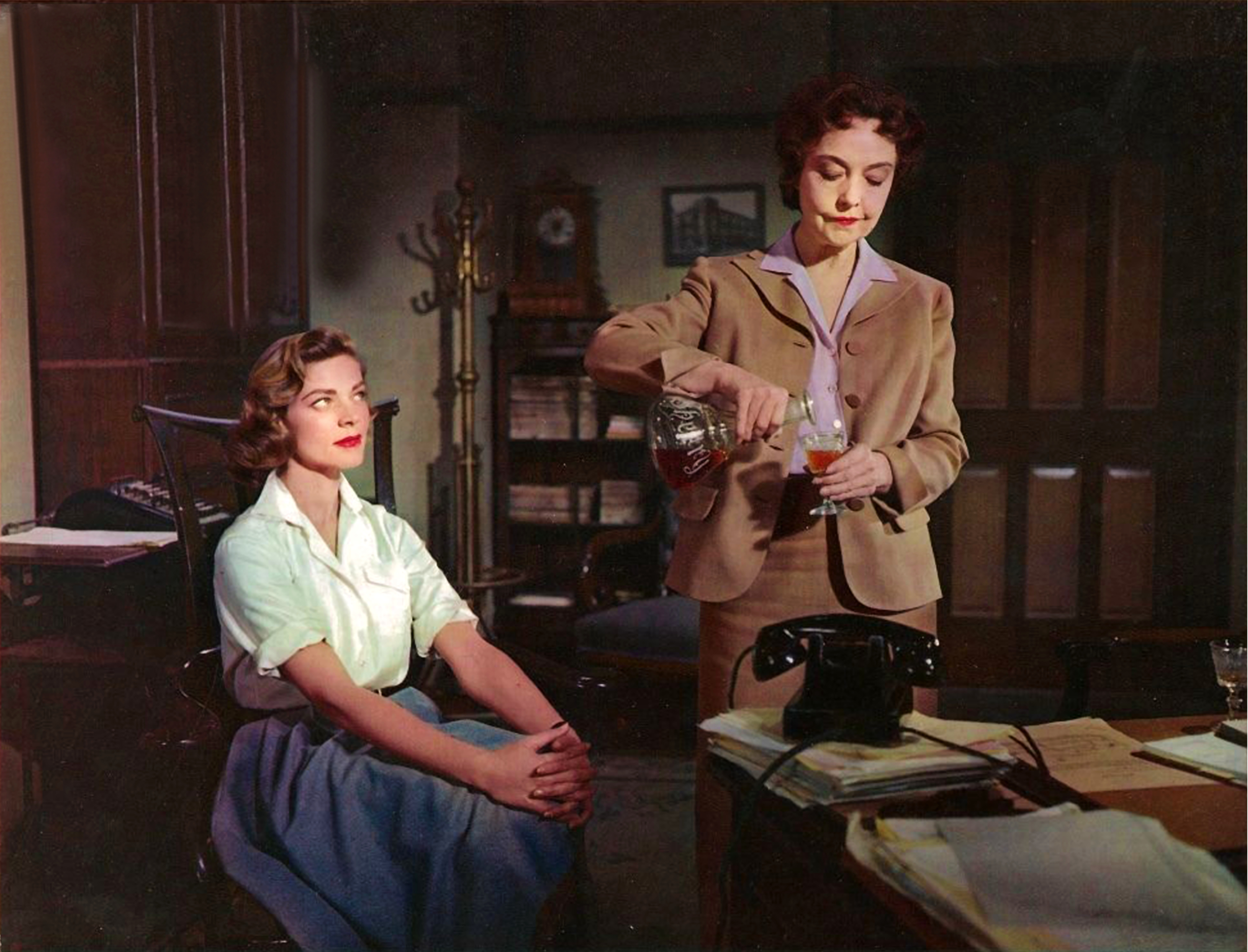
Lauren Bacall and Lillian Gish in a publicity still of the film.

The opening credits are followed by the following onscreen words:

"The trouble began ---"

Dr. Stewart McIver (Richard Widmark) is now in charge of a psychiatric institution, one run for many years by medical director Dr. Douglas Devanal (Charles Boyer).

McIver must address the needs of a number of disturbed patients, among them Steven (Stevie) Holte (John Kerr), a possibly suicidal artist, and the self-loathing Mr. Capp (Oscar Levant). All of his responsibilities keep McIver so busy that his wife, Karen (Gloria Grahame), feels increasingly frustrated and ignored.

When new drapes are needed for the clinic's library, the dour and penny-pinching Victoria Inch (Lillian Gish) orders unattractive ones. Karen McIver takes it upon herself to buy a more expensive and colorful set instead, gaining the approval of the chairman of the board Regina Mitchell-Smythe (Mabel Albertson), but without the knowledge of her husband. What should be an insignificant matter is complicated further by Dr. McIver giving the patients, principally Stevie, permission to design and create the new drapes themselves.

Personalities clash. Dr. Devanal, who has a drinking problem, has been having an affair with his secretary Miss Cobb (Adele Jergens), and makes a clumsy pass at McIver's wife as well. McIver begins to fall in love with Meg Rinehart (Lauren Bacall), a member of his staff. Miss Inch privately schemes to expose the unseemly behavior of Devanal at the next meeting of the board and issues a veiled threat to do so to McIver as well, while Devanal's wife, Edna (Fay Wray), mistakenly believes McIver to be behind the plot to discredit her husband.

Having felt stable enough to go on a date with Sue Brett (Susan Strasberg), another patient, Stevie Holte is very upset to discover that new drapes have been installed, not the ones his artwork was meant to inspire. He disappears, causing a search party to look for him and McIver to fear a suicide. At the next board meeting, Dr. Devanal submits his resignation to the board.

After the meeting, the McIvers agree to work on their marriage and head home where they find Stevie having survived his attempt at suicide.

At the end of the film, the words appear onscreen:

"The trouble was over ---"

== Cast ==
- Richard Widmark as Dr. Stewart McIver
- Lauren Bacall as Meg Rinehart
- Charles Boyer as Dr. Devanal
- Gloria Grahame as Karen McIver
- Lillian Gish as Victoria Inch
- John Kerr as Steven W. Holte
- Susan Strasberg as Sue Brett
- Oscar Levant as Mr. Capp
- Tommy Rettig as Mark McIver
- Paul Stewart as Dr. Otto Wolff
- Jarma Lewis as Lois Y. Demuth
- Adele Jergens as Miss Cobb
- Edgar Stehli as Mr. Holcolmb
- Sandra Descher as Rosemary
- Bert Freed as Abe Irwin
- Mabel Albertson as Regina Mitchell-Smythe
- Fay Wray as Edna Devanal
- Oliver Blake as Curly
- Olive Carey as Mrs. O'Brien
- Eve McVeagh as Mrs. Shirley Irwin
- Virginia Christine as Sally

== Music ==
The score was composed, conducted, and orchestrated by Leonard Rosenman. The music distinguishes itself by "having the first predominantly twelve-tone score ever written for a motion picture".

The first release of portions of the score was on MGM Records on LP in 1957. The complete score in stereo was issued on CD in 2003, on Film Score Monthly records.

== Release and reception ==
=== Box office ===
According to MGM records, The Cobweb earned $1,385,000 in the US and Canada, and $593,000 elsewhere, resulting in a loss of $1,141,000.

=== Critical reception ===
On review aggregator Rotten Tomatoes, the film holds an approval rating of 75% based on eight reviews, with an average rating of 6.5/10.

=== Home media ===
The film was released on DVD as part of the Warner Archive Collection on January 18, 2011.

== See also ==
- List of American films of 1955
- Lillian Gish filmography
