= Hans Lobert =

American baseball player, scout, and manager (1881–1968)

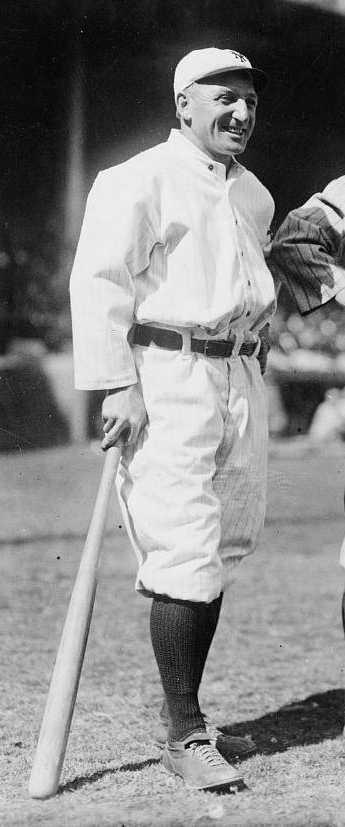
- Third baseman / Shortstop / Manager
- Born: October 18, 1881; Wilmington, Delaware, U.S.
- Died: September 14, 1968 (aged 86); Philadelphia, Pennsylvania, U.S.
- Batted: Right Threw: Right

MLB debut
- September 21, 1903, for the Pittsburgh Pirates

Last MLB appearance
- October 3, 1917, for the New York Giants

MLB statistics
- Batting average: .274
- Home runs: 32
- Runs batted in: 481
- Stolen bases: 316
- Managerial record: 42–111
- Winning %: .275
- Stats at Baseball Reference

Teams
- As player: Pittsburgh Pirates (1903); Chicago Cubs (1905); Cincinnati Reds (1906–1910); Philadelphia Phillies (1911–1914); New York Giants (1915–1917); As manager: Philadelphia Phillies (1938, 1942); As coach: Philadelphia Phillies (1934–1938, 1939–1941); Cincinnati Reds (1943–1944)

John Bernard "Hans" Lobert (October 18, 1881 – September 14, 1968) was an American third baseman, shortstop, coach, manager and scout in Major League Baseball. Lobert was immortalized in the 1953 film Big Leaguer and in the 1966 Lawrence Ritter book The Glory of Their Times.

== Early life ==
Lobert was born in Wilmington, Delaware. He was the son of a cabinet maker. Lobert was one of six children, including brothers Frank and Ollie, who also became professional baseball players. The family eventually moved to Williamsport, Pennsylvania after his baseball career began. Lobert attended Carnegie Mellon University in Pittsburgh, Pennsylvania.

== Playing career ==
Barney Dreyfuss, owner of the Pittsburgh Pirates, invited Lobert to try out for his team in September 1903. He started his professional baseball career at the age of 21 that same month. Like shortstop Honus Wagner, a teammate as well as a neighbor of Lobert's when he first came to the major leagues, the German-American Lobert earned the nickname "Hans" as a familiar form of Johannes, the German version of his given name, and was dubbed "Hans Number 2" by Honus Wagner. He would keep this name for the next 50 years. Lobert batted .274 for his career and played 14 seasons (1903, 1905–1917) with five National League clubs, including regular stints as a third baseman for the Cincinnati Reds (1906–1910) and Philadelphia Phillies (1911–1914). He also played with the Pittsburgh Pirates (1903), Chicago Cubs (1905), and New York Giants (1915–1917).

Fred Clarke, manager of the Pittsburgh Pirates, had Lobert try every infield position except for first base. He had five appearances in the fall of the 1903 season. Lobert had three errors and only one hit of 13 at-bats. The hit was during a game against the New York Giants with Joe McGinnity as pitcher, and Lobert bunted for a single. In 1904, The Pirates sold him to Des Moines, Iowa, which was part of the Western League. Lobert played in 143 games that season, batting .264 and stealing 37 bases. When the team came under new ownership in 1905, Lobert was offered a contract with a significant pay cut; he jumped teams to play for Johnstown, Pennsylvania, part of the Tri-State League, where he played 115 games, batted .337, and stole 31 bases. Later that same season, Johnstown sold Lobert to the Chicago Cubs, where he batted .196 in 14 games. He was traded once again before the start of the 1906 season, this time to the Cincinnati Reds. Lobert batted .310 and stole 20 bases in 79 games, playing 35 games at third base, 31 at shortstop, and ten at second base. He replaced Tommy Corcoran as the everyday shortstop in 1907. In the middle of the 1908 season, Lobert made his career-changing move to third base.

During his career, Lobert was known as one of the fastest players in the game. He once raced a racehorse around the bases between innings during a game, an event that he recounted in The Glory of Their Times. On September 27, 1908, Lobert became the first Reds player to steal second base, third base, and home plate in the same inning. At 26 years old, he was the top player in almost every offensive category for the Reds and played all 155 games; he batted an average of .293, and in 570 at-bats, had 71 runs, 167 hits, 17 doubles, 18 triples, 4 home runs, 63 runs batted in, and 47 stolen bases, his new career high. The next season, the Reds led the National League in stolen bases with 280; however, Lobert's batting average suffered and went down to .212. In 1910, the Reds continued their lead in the category with a new total of 310 stolen bases, with Lobert stealing 41 bases and batting .309 while playing only 39 games because of a back injury. That same year, he was traded, along with 7 other players, to the Philadelphia Phillies. He led the Phillies with 40 stolen bases and batted .285 in 1911. The following year, Lobert played only 65 games due to another injury, but he was still able to increase his batting average to .327.

Lobert married Rachael Campbell in 1913. That same year, he won the 100 yard dash on the Polo Grounds against Jim Thorpe. Lobert had the top fielding percentage as a third baseman in the National League with a .974 fielding percentage and came in third in the National League with 98 runs, 41 stolen bases, and 243 bases, while playing all but one game. At this point, he considered signing with the Chicago Whales as part of the Federal League, but John McGraw, manager of the New York Giants, convinced him not to, and in January 1915, Lobert signed a three-year contract with the Giants that matched the salary the Whales had offered. In addition to this, the Giants also traded pitcher Al Demaree, third baseman Milt Stock, and reserve catcher Bert Adams for Lobert. He became the Giants' regular third baseman, batting .251. In 1915, his season ended after 106 games due to torn ligaments in his knee. Lobert played his last game with the Giants on October 3, 1917 at the age of 35.

In 1317 games over 14 seasons, Lobert compiled a .274 batting average (1252 hits in 4563 at bats) with 640 runs, 159 doubles, 82 triples, 32 home runs, 481 runs batted in, 316 stolen bases, 395 base on balls, 302 strikeouts, .337 on-base percentage and .366 slugging percentage. Defensively, he recorded a .941 fielding percentage.

== After baseball ==
Lobert went on to be the baseball coach of the United States Military Academy at West Point with the help of McGraw. He later served as McGraw's full-time scout and eventually become a coach for the New York Giants in 1928. Lobert became the manager of the Eastern League's Bridgeport Bears team, the next year. He then managed the Jersey City team of the International League. After managing in the minor leagues during the 1920s and early 1930s, Lobert became a coach for the Phillies from 1934 through 1941. At 60, he became one of the oldest rookie managers in baseball history when he was appointed skipper of the 1942 Phils, in the midst of the longest streak of futility in their history. Under Lobert, the club lost 109 games (they had lost 111 under Doc Prothro in 1941). Counting two losses as an interim manager in 1938, Lobert's career managerial record was 42–111 (.275).

After his one season at the Phillies' helm, Lobert's career in uniform ended as a Cincinnati coach (1943–44). He then became a scout for the Dodgers and Giants, serving until his death in Philadelphia at age 86. He was an alumnus of Carnegie Mellon University.

A 1953 film, Big Leaguer, set at a Giants training camp in Melbourne, Florida, was a fictional story, but starred Edward G. Robinson in the role of Lobert. Lobert plays a cameo in two brief scenes. He also served as the film's technical advisor.

== See also ==
- List of Major League Baseball career stolen bases leaders
