= April in Paris (film) =

1952 film by David Butler

- Theatrical release poster
- Directed by: David Butler
- Written by: Jack Rose; Melville Shavelson
- Produced by: William Jacobs
- Starring: Doris Day; Ray Bolger; Claude Dauphin
- Cinematography: Wilfred M. Cline
- Edited by: Irene Morra
- Music by: Vernon Duke; LeRoy Prinz
- Production company: Warner Bros. Pictures
- Distributed by: Warner Bros. Pictures
- Release date: December 24, 1952
- Running time: 94 minutes
- Country: United States
- Language: English
- Box office: $2.75 million (U.S.)

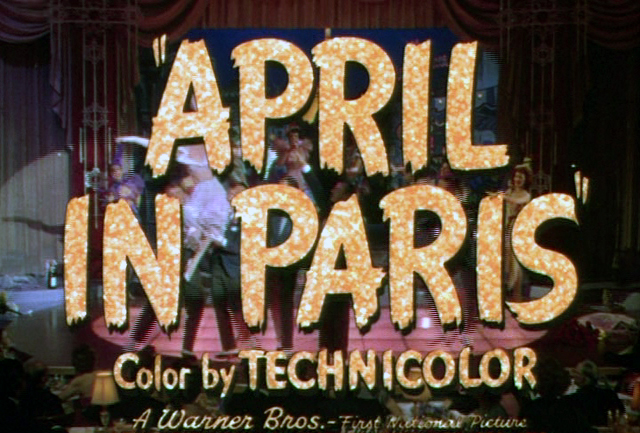
Title card from the trailer for April in Paris

April in Paris is a 1952 American musical romantic comedy film directed by David Butler and starring Doris Day and Ray Bolger.

== Plot ==
Winthrop Putnam is the officious assistant secretary to the assistant to the Under Secretary of State, a D.C. diplomat arranging an international arts exposition in Paris. In a case of mistaken identity, the State Department invitation intended for Ethel Barrymore is delivered to Ethel "Dynamite" Jackson, a Broadway chorus girl. Putnam flies to New York to intervene, spoiling the impromptu celebration for Jackson. After higher-ranking diplomat Robert Sherman concludes that inviting Jackson was a stroke of genius, Putnam reverses course and convinces her to take the trip.

Also aboard the transatlantic ship carrying the U.S. delegation is the Frenchman Philippe Fouquet, eager to return to Paris, joining the crew as a waiter. Jackson begins a romance with Putnam despite his engagement to Sherman's daughter. Fouquet introduces them to the ship's captain, who marries them. However, the captain was impersonated by a busboy. Rather than admit to the deception, Fouquet and the busboy thwart Putnam and Jackson from consummating their mistaken wedlock.

Putnam's fiancée Marcia meets the American delegation when they arrive in Paris the next morning. Marcia is immediately suspicious of the situation between Putnam and Jackson, and the women's mutual disregard mounts into a brawl at the International Festival of the Arts. With help from the sly Fouquet along the way, amidst the sights and scenes of the city, true love ultimately reunites Jackson and Putnam.

== Cast ==
- Doris Day as Ethel S. "Dynamite" Jackson
- Ray Bolger as S. Winthrop Putnam
- Claude Dauphin as Philippe Fouquet
- Eve Miller as Marcia Sherman
- George Givot as François
- Paul Harvey as Secretary Robert Sherman
- Herbert Farjeon as Joshua Stevens
- Wilson Millar as Sinclair Wilson
- Raymond Largay as Joseph Welmar
- John Alvin as Tracy
- Jack Lomas as Cab Driver
- Jarma Lewis as Chorine

== Songs ==
- "April in Paris"
- "It Must Be Good" — Doris Day
- "I'm Gonna Ring the Bell Tonight" — Doris Day and Ray Bolger
- "That's What Makes Paris Paree" — Doris Day and Claude Dauphin
- "Give Me Your Lips" — Claude Dauphin
- "I Ask You" — Doris Day, Ray Bolger, and Claude Dauphin
- "The Place You Hold in My Heart (I Know a Place)" — Doris Day
- "Auprès de ma blonde" — Claude Dauphin

"April in Paris" was first a hit in 1932, with music by Vernon Duke and Yip Harburg lyrics. The film's new songs were written by Duke with lyrics by Sammy Cahn.
