= The Marauders (1955 film) =

1955 film by Gerald Mayer

- Film poster
- Directed by: Gerald Mayer
- Screenplay by: Jack Leonard and Earl Felton
- Based on: From the novel by Alan Marcus
- Produced by: Arthur M. Loew, Jr.
- Starring: Dan Duryea; Jeff Richards; Keenan Wynn; Jarma Lewis
- Cinematography: Harold Marzorati, A.S.C.
- Edited by: Russell Selwyn
- Music by: Paul Sawtell
- Color process: Eastmancolor; Technicolor
- Production company: Metro-Goldwyn-Mayer
- Distributed by: Metro-Goldwyn-Mayer
- Release date: May 20, 1955
- Running time: 81 minutes
- Country: United States
- Language: English
- Budget: $548,000
- Box office: $928,000

The Marauders is a 1955 American Western film directed by Gerald Mayer and starring Dan Duryea, Jeff Richards, Keenan Wynn and Jarma Lewis.

== Plot ==
In the Arizona Territory during 1875, rancher John Rutherford has gathered a posse to attempt to remove a squatter, Corey Everett, from his land. After Rutherford and his son Roy are wounded in a confrontation with Everett and later die from their wounds, Rutherford employee Avery violently seizes control of the group. Wearing his brother's Confederate Army uniform, Avery insists his men call him "General" and obey his orders to launch another attack, having become convinced that Everett had at least fifteen men fighting by his side.

A family called the Ferbers are traveling by wagon. They meet Everett, who explains that he is homesteading, not squatting, and entitled to the property, though Hannah Ferber dislikes and distrusts him. Louis Ferber is later tortured and killed on Avery's orders. Hannah shoots Everett in the shoulder and flees, but returns to treat his wounds after Avery shows her Louis's body. In the climax, Avery's men desert him before he dies, shocked to learn that Everett had no other men fighting with him.

== Cast ==
- Dan Duryea as Mr. Avery
- Jeff Richards as Corey Everett
- Keenan Wynn as Hook
- Jarma Lewis as Hannah Ferber
- John Hudson as Roy Rutherford
- Harry Shannon as John Rutherford
- David Kasday as Albie Ferber
- James Anderson as Louis Ferber
- Richard Lupino as Perc Kettering
- Peter Mamakos as Ramos
- Mort Mills as Carmack
- John Damler as Cooper
- Michael Dugan as Sal
- Ken Carlton as Thumbo

== Reception ==
According to MGM records the movie earned $551,000 in the US and Canada and $37,000 elsewhere, making a loss to the studio of $110,000.

== See also ==
- List of American films of 1955
