= I Cover the Underworld =

1955 film by R. G. Springsteen

- Theatrical release poster
- Directed by: R. G. Springsteen
- Screenplay by: John K. Butler
- Produced by: William J. O'Sullivan
- Starring: Sean McClory; Joanne Jordan; Ray Middleton; Jaclynne Greene; Lee Van Cleef; James Griffith
- Cinematography: Reggie Lanning
- Edited by: Tony Martinelli
- Music by: R. Dale Butts
- Production company: Republic Pictures
- Distributed by: Republic Pictures
- Release date: May 19, 1955
- Running time: 70 minutes
- Country: United States
- Language: English

I Cover the Underworld is a 1955 American crime film directed by R. G. Springsteen and written by John K. Butler. The film stars Sean McClory, Joanne Jordan, Ray Middleton, Jaclynne Greene, Lee Van Cleef and James Griffith. The film was released on May 19, 1955, by Republic Pictures.

== Cast ==
- Sean McClory as Gunner O'Hara & John O'Hara
- Joanne Jordan as Joan Marlowe
- Ray Middleton as Police Chief Corbett
- Jaclynne Greene as Gilda
- Lee Van Cleef as Flash Logan
- James Griffith as Smiley Di Angelo
- Hugh Sanders as Tim Donovan
- Roy Roberts as District Attorney
- Peter Mamakos as Charlie Green
- Robert Crosson as Danny Marlowe
- Frank Gerstle as Dum-Dum Wilson
- Willis Bouchey as Warden Lewis J. Johnson
- Philip Van Zandt as Jake Freeman
