= Kathleen Case =

American actress (1933–1979)

- Born: Catherine Walker; July 31, 1933; Pittsburgh, Pennsylvania, U.S.
- Died: July 22, 1979 (aged 45); North Hollywood, California, U.S.
- Occupation: Actress
- Years active: 1951–1961

Kathleen Case (born Catherine Walker, also credited as Cathy Case, Kathy Case, and Cassie Case; July 31, 1933 – July 22, 1979) was an American film and television actress and a ballerina.

== Early life and career ==
Case was born on July 31, 1933, in Pittsburgh, Pennsylvania, and she grew up in Cincinnati. Her mother died three days after Case's birth, and she was raised by her grandmother, Mrs. Ira Hamilton Case.

When she was 11 years old she first performed professionally, dancing in Cincinnati as part of the Metropolitan Opera's summer season. She later danced with the Ballet Theater and was ballerina with the San Carlo Opera Company.

Columbia Pictures signed Case to a term contract in 1954. During her acting career she performed in films such as Human Desire (1954), Last of the Pony Riders (1953), and Running Wild (1955). She also appeared in a variety of American television series produced in the 1950s and early 1960s.

== Personal life and death ==
Case was seriously injured in a power boat accident in February 1959 and was in the hospital for more than two months.

On February 5, 1967, Case was driving in Hollywood, California, when her car collided head-on with a vehicle driven by actor Dirk Rambo, the twin brother of actor Dack Rambo. A car fire resulted. Dirk Rambo was killed, and his passenger, Horace H. Hester, was seriously injured. A Los Angeles municipal court judge dismissed felony drunken driving and manslaughter charges against her two months later.

Case died in North Hollywood, California, aged 45.

== Filmography ==
Year	Title	Role	Notes
1951	Two Tickets to Broadway	Ad-Lib Woman	Uncredited
1952	Junction City	Penny Clinton	
1953	Last of the Pony Riders	Katie McEwen	
1953	Flight Nurse	Florence	Uncredited
1953	The Eddie Cantor Story	Francey	Uncredited
1954	Human Desire	Ellen Simmons	
1955	The Second Greatest Sex	Tilda Bean	
1955	Running Wild	Leta Novak	
1956	Calling Homicide	Donna Graham	

== Bibliography ==
- Blottner, Gene. Columbia Pictures Movie Series, 1926-1955: The Harry Cohn Years. McFarland, 2011.
