= John Hudson (actor) =

American actor

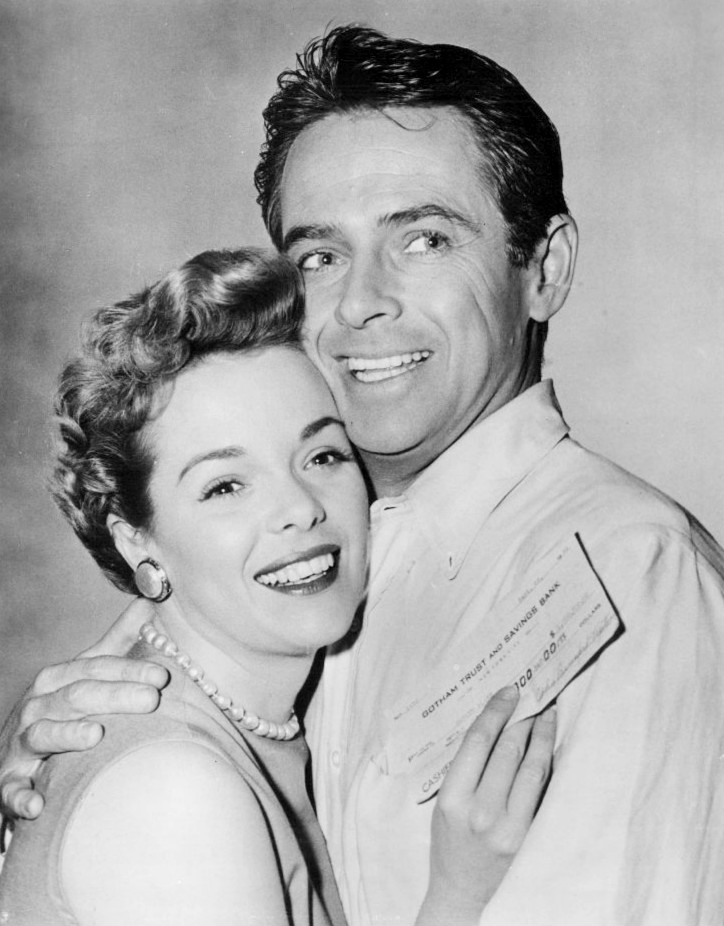
- Nancy Gates and John Hudson on TV's; The Millionaire (1955)
- Born: Jonathan C. Hudson; January 24, 1919; Gilroy, California, U.S.
- Died: April 8, 1996 (aged 77); Los Angeles, California, U.S.
- Years active: 1942–1972
- Relatives: William Hudson (twin brother)

Jonathan C. Hudson (January 24, 1919 – April 8, 1996) was an American actor who appeared in the films Gunfight at the O.K. Corral with Burt Lancaster and G.I. Blues with Elvis Presley.

== Biography ==
Born and raised in Gilroy, California, Hudson served in the U.S. Army Air Forces during World War II, where he attained the rank of second lieutenant, and then embarked on his acting career. In the 1940s, he was married to film/TV actress Mary LaRoche.

He made guest appearances on numerous television shows, such as Perry Mason, Dragnet 1967, 77 Sunset Strip, I Dream of Jeannie, Sea Hunt, Gunsmoke, and Adam-12.

Hudson acted on Broadway in The Eve of St. Mark, Junior Miss, Craig's Wife, and January Thaw.

=== Death ===
Hudson died at age 77 on April 8, 1996, in Los Angeles, California.

== Filmography ==
Year	Title	Role	Notes
1947	Hue and Cry	Stan, of the 'Blood and Thunder Boys'	first film role
1951	Bright Victory	Cpl. John Flagg	
1952	The Cimarron Kid	Dynamite Dick Dalton	Supporting role
1952	The Battle at Apache Pass	Lt. George Bascom	Supporting role
1952	Red Ball Express	Tank Sergeant	Minor role
1952	Biff Baker, U.S.A	Capt. Barrow	TV series, guest role in episode "Crash Landing"
1952	The Web		TV series, Minor role The Tower, [S3, E14]
1953	Sea of Lost Ships	Pilot	
1954	The Turbulent Air	Antoine Lavoisier	TV movie, guest role
1954	Silver Lode	Michael 'Mitch' Evans	
1955	The Millionaire	Joe Iris	TV series, guest role in episode "The Joe Iris Story"
1955	Many Rivers to Cross	Hugh Cherne	
1955	The Racers	Michel Caron	movie, co-starring Kirk Douglas as Michel Caron
1955	The Loretta Young Show	Peter Chase	TV series, 2 episodes
1955	The Marauders	Roy Rutherford	
1955	Fort Yuma	Sgt. Jonas	
1953–1955	The Philco-Goodyear Television Playhouse	Dick Morgan	TV series, 2 episodes
1956	When Gangland Strikes	Bob Keeler	Film role
1956	Mohawk	Captain Langley	Film role
1956	Cavalcade of America	Ed Connors	Episode: "Diplomatic Outpost"
1954–1957	The Ford Television Theatre	Payne Todd / Brad / Scott Averill Jr.	3 episodes
1957	Gunfight at the O.K. Corral	Virgil Earp	Supporting role
1958	The Screaming Skull	Eric Whitlock	Film role
1958	The Silent Service	Walter T. Griffith	Episode: "The Bowfin Story"
1959	Perry Mason	Tom Wyatt	Episode: "The Case of the Glittering Goldfish"
1960	Wagon Train	Alex Stoddard	Episode: "The Felizia Kingdom Story"
1960	Valley of the Redwoods	Wayne Randall	
1960	G.I. Blues	Captain Hobart	With Elvis Presley
1961	All in a Night's Work	Harry Lane	
1961	Sea Hunt	Jerry Blaine	in season 4, episode 19: "Sub Hatch"
1964	77 Sunset Strip	Rawlins	Episode: "Dead as in 'Dude'"
1964	Gunsmoke	Curley Graham	Episode "Once a Haggen"
1965	I Dream Of Jeannie	Grover Caldwell	Episode: "Jeannie and the Marriage Caper"
1966	Combat!	Captain Jampel	Episode: "The Chapel at Able-Five"
1968–1970	Dragnet 1967	Daniel Lumis / Sgt. Tom Wallen / Lt. Bob Kearney	3 episodes
1970	Adam-12	Vice Detective Hal Forest - Impersonated by Mr. Wall (in real life, his twin brother, William Hudson)	Season 2, Episode 16: "Impersonation"
1970	The F.B.I.	Bank Manager	Episode: "The Condemned"
1970	Dan August	Guest role	Episode: "Murder by Proxy"
1972	Cannon	Detective Kaplan	Episode: "That Was No Lady"
