= It's a Dog's Life (film) =

1955 film

- Directed by: Herman Hoffman
- Based on: The Bar Sinister; 1903 novel by Richard Harding Davis
- Produced by: Henry Berman
- Starring: Jeff Richards; Edmund Gwenn; Jarma Lewis; Dean Jagger; Sally Fraser; Vic Morrow
- Cinematography: Paul C. Vogel
- Edited by: John Dunning
- Music by: Elmer Bernstein
- Distributed by: Metro-Goldwyn-Mayer
- Release date: December 23, 1955
- Running time: 86-88 min
- Country: United States
- Language: English
- Budget: $891,000
- Box office: $509,000

It's a Dog's Life is a 1955 American comedy drama film directed by Herman Hoffman and starring Jeff Richards, Edmund Gwenn and Jarma Lewis. It is adapted from Richard Harding Davis’s 1903 novel The Bar Sinister.

== Plot ==
It’s a Dog’s Life is narrated by Wildfire (voiced by Vic Morrow) a Bull Terrier dog who betters the life of the affluent family that adopts him. At the turn of the century, he and his mother roam the streets of New York for food and shelter. Wildfire soon becomes curious about his past and seeks answers from a knowledgeable old neighborhood dog, who informs him that his father, Champion Regent Royal — supposedly a prize-winning fighter dog—abandoned his mother while she was pregnant. Wildfire resolves to track down his father and kill him, just before discovering that his mother has mysteriously vanished. Now on his own, the determined stray sets out on his quest for honor and winds up in the dangerous Bowery district, where he becomes a successful pit fighter at a saloon. Wildfire flourishes under the expertise of a ruthless hustler named Patch McGill (Jeff Richards), but his winning streak comes to an abrupt end when his master greedily matches him against a much larger dog; McGill blames Wildfire for the loss, prompting the dog to return to the waterfront.

Fortune strikes when an admirer of Wildfire’s—animal caretaker Jeremiah Nolan (Edmund Gwenn) — takes the dog back to his quarters at a massive countryside estate owned by a self-made millionaire (and dog breeder), Mr. Wyndham, played by Dean Jagger. Bitter over his own failing health, Wyndham initially opposes the presence of the “mongrel,” but his daughter Dorothy (Sally Fraser), recognizes the dog’s beauty and convinces her father to let him stay if he qualifies for a ribbon at a local dog show. Wildfire falls in love with a fellow contender named Miss Ladyship, and not only qualifies but goes on to win first prize at the competition. It turns out his father was not a fighter but a renowned show dog, and Wildfire is a chip off the old block. Wyndham subsequently warms to the fearless dog, admiring his courage, and learns to enjoy life again by accepting his own mortality.

Dorothy enters Wildfire in the Grand National Championship at Madison Square Garden, where the hero faces his destiny by competing against Regent Royal. Wildfire wins once again, but decides not to kill his father, having been touched by his Regent Royal’s gracious acceptance of defeat. A dog riot breaks out when Wildfire defends his father from heckling canines; thinking he has disgraced the Wyndhams, the hero flees the scene and subsequently becomes trapped by dogcatcher, one who coincidentally has Wildfire’s mother in his wagon. Wyndham arrives on the scene and buys Wildfire and his mother from the dogcatcher. Back at the estate, Regent Royal reunites with Wildfire’s mother and escaped pageant contestant Miss Ladyship goes on to give birth to a litter of Wildfire’s puppies.

== Cast ==
- Jeff Richards as Patch McGill
- Jarma Lewis as Mabel Maycroft
- Edmund Gwenn as Jeremiah Edward Emmett Augustus Nolan
- Dean Jagger as Mr. Wyndham
- Willard Sage as Tom Tattle
- Sally Fraser as Dorothy Wyndham
- Richard Anderson as George Oakley
- J.M. Kerrigan as Paddy Corbin
- Wildfire as Wildfire - a Dog
  - An uncredited Vic Morrow provides Wildfire's voice

== Music ==
In 2010, Film Score Monthly released the complete scores of the seven Lassie feature films released by MGM between 1943 and 1955 as well as Elmer Bernstein’s score for this film in the collection: Lassie Come Home: The Canine Cinema Collection, limited to 1000 copies. Due to the era when these scores were recorded, nearly half of the music masters have been lost so the scores had to be reconstructed and restored from the best available sources, mainly the Music and Effects tracks as well as monaural ¼″ tapes.

The score for It's a Dog's Life was composed by Elmer Bernstein. It was released in its entirety and in stereo, as it comes from the three-track magnetic film era.

Track listing for It's a Dog's Life (Disc 5)

1. Main Title/Wildfire’s Song 1:54
2. Wildfire’s Shame/Decision 1:59
3. Fame at Last/Masterful/Defeat 2:42
4. Nolan/Getting Acquainted/What a St. Bernard 1:46
5. Jocks/In the Hay/Trophy Room 3:39
6. After the Fight/Wyndham’s Story 2:50
7. Wash Day/Training 1:55
8. Tattle 0:51
9. Wyndham Walks and Talks/Nocturne/Going Home 5:16
10. Wildfire’s Training 0:51
11. Mother 1:54
12. The End 2:33

Total Time: 28:33

== Reception ==
According to MGM records the movie earned $357,000 in the US and Canada and $152,000 elsewhere, making a loss to the studio of $848,000.
