= Joanne Jordan =

American actress (1920–2009)

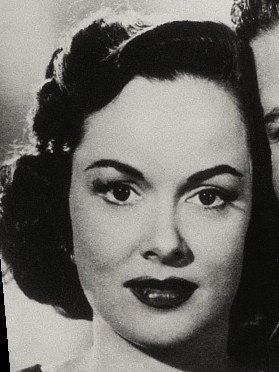
- Jordan in 1955
- Born: September 5, 1920; Topeka, Kansas, U.S
- Died: July 20, 2009 (aged 88); Calabasas, California, U.S.
- Occupations: Actress; television spokesmodel
- Years active: 1951–1957
- Spouse: MacLeod (m. 1939; div. 1950)
- Children: 3

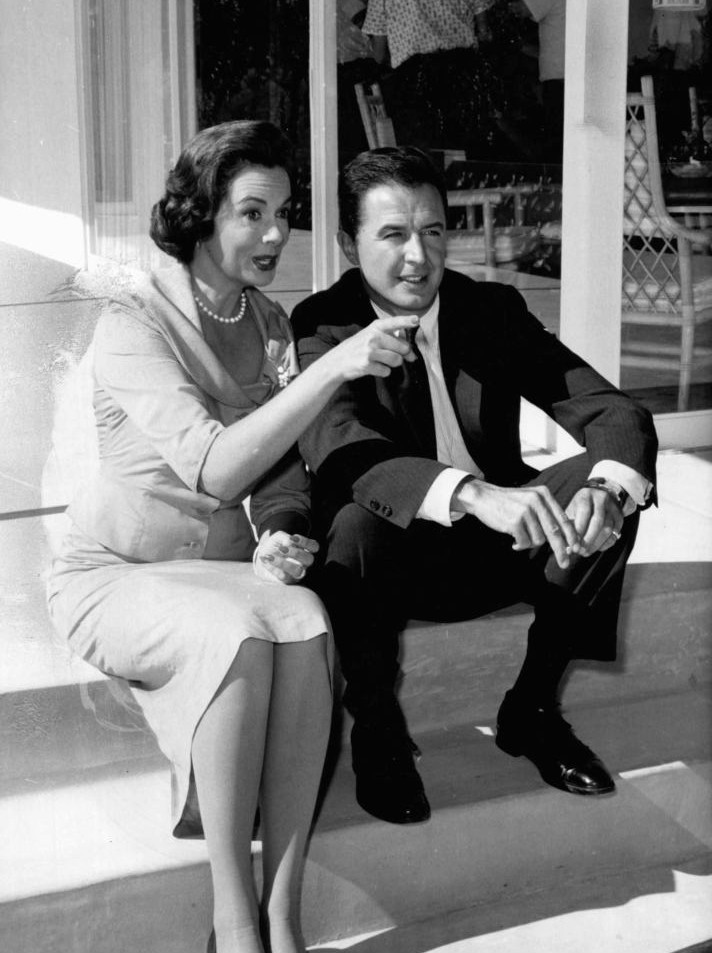
Jordan and Dean Miller in Here's Hollywood in 1960

Joanne Jordan (September 5, 1920 – July 29, 2009) was an American actress and television spokesmodel who appeared in at least 12 films and 200 TV shows.

== Early years ==
Jordan's father was a salesman, and she thought that she "inherited that quality". At one point, for less than three months, she and her sister operated a restaurant, The Ranch House. She tried working as a model but had little success because her figure did not match what fashion photographers wanted.

== Career ==
Jordan's debut in commercials occurred on KTLA-TV when she promoted canned tuna during the broadcast of an old film. She appeared in her first network commercial when she had a small role on The George Burns and Gracie Allen Show and was asked to also do a commercial in the program. She was especially nervous during her first 1 1/2 years in that job, when she tried to memorize all of her lines. Then she began reading from cue cards or Teleprompters. She performed in commercials for "products ranging from cosmetics to cigarettes and canned tuna fish". She acknowledged some competition from better-known actresses, but she said that they were at a disadvantage; having played roles so much, they found it difficult to come across as themselves. Her gross income from commercials was approximately $200,000 per year. She continued making them after she became co-host of a Hollywood-based interview program.

Jordan was co-host of Here's Hollywood, an NBC afternoon program that featured interviews and presented celebrities in various settings around Hollywood.

Her film credits include Loophole and Son of Sinbad. She also portrayed Queen Mirtha on the television series Space Patrol. Other TV shows on which she acted included City Detective, Four Star Playhouse, and Racket Squad.

Besides film, she acted on stage, at one time performing in a Noël Coward play at the Harold Lloyd co-founded Beverly Hills Little Theatre for Professionals.

== Personal life ==
Jordan was married twice and had three children.

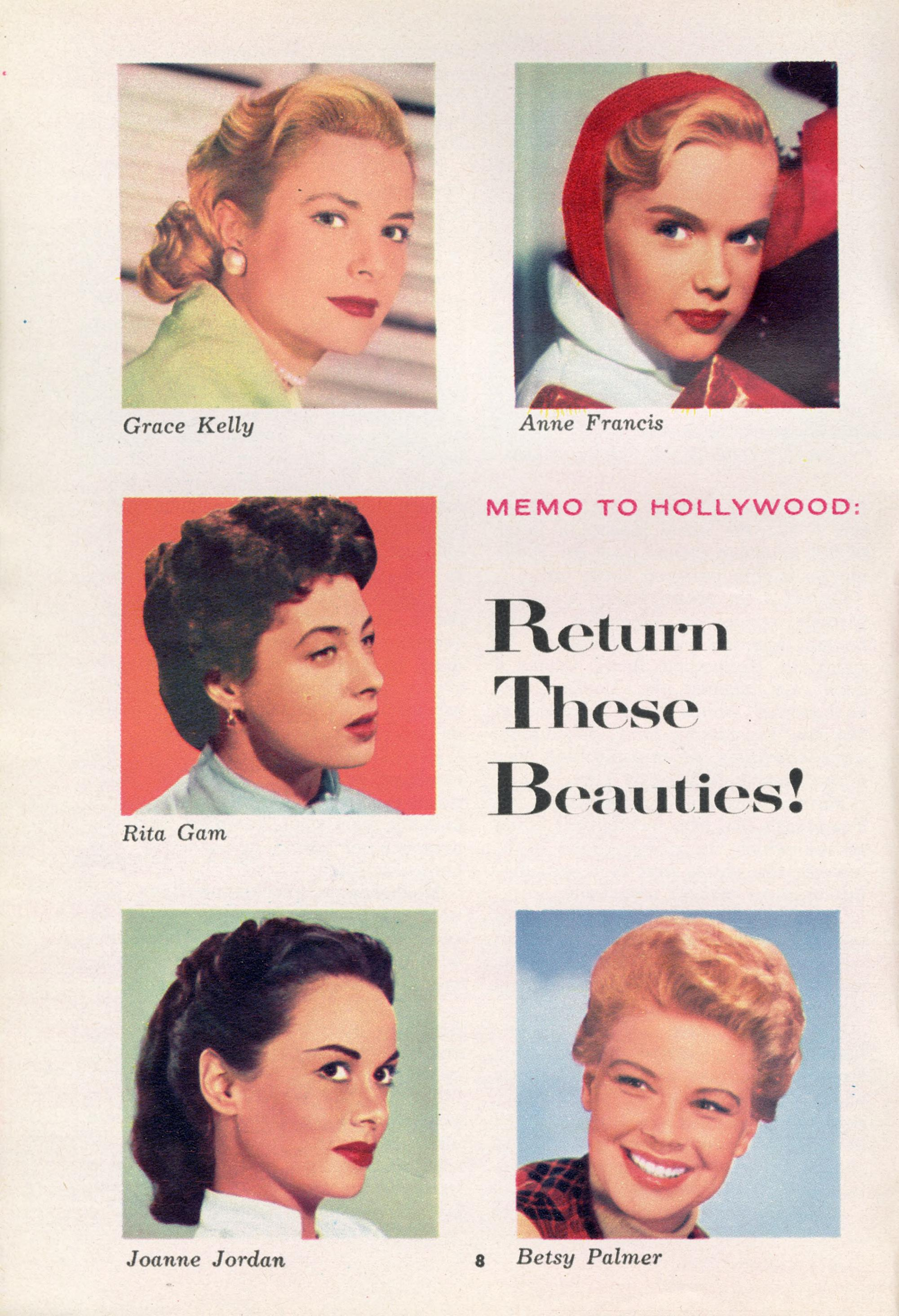
Jordan (bottom row, left) in TV Guide, October 30, 1954

== Filmography ==
- 1951: Racket Squad (TV Series)
- 1951: Two Tickets to Broadway - Showgirl (uncredited)
- 1951: Too Many Wives (Short)
- 1952: Aladdin and His Lamp - Harem Girl (uncredited)
- 1952: Lydia Bailey - Lady-in-Waiting (uncredited)
- 1952: Sound Off - Showgirl (uncredited)
- 1953: Roar of the Crowd - Secretary (uncredited)
- 1953: Dragnet (TV Series)
- 1953: The Farmer Takes a Wife - Boatwife (uncredited)
- 1953-1955: My Little Margie (TV Series) - Miss Hennessy
- 1954: The George Burns and Gracie Allen Show (TV Series) - Fran
- 1954: Loophole - Georgia Hoard
- 1954: The Pepsi-Cola Playhouse (TV Series)
- 1954: The Mickey Rooney Show (TV Series) - Julie
- 1954: Rocky Jones, Space Ranger (TV Series) - The Vonsoom
- 1954 Four Star Playhouse (TV Series) - Molly
- 1954: I Led 3 Lives (TV Series) - Martha
- 1955: City Detective (TV Series) - Nancy
- 1955: I Cover the Underworld - Joan Marlowe
- 1955: Son of Sinbad - Ghenia (uncredited)
- 1955: The Shrike - Miss Cardell (uncredited)
- 1955: Commando Cody: Sky Marshal of the Universe (TV Series) - Queen of Mercury
- 1956: The Bottom of the Bottle - Emily
- 1956: Written on the Wind - Brunette
- 1957: Jet Pilot - WAC Sergeant (uncredited) (final film role)
