= Jarma Lewis =

American actress and model (1931–1985)

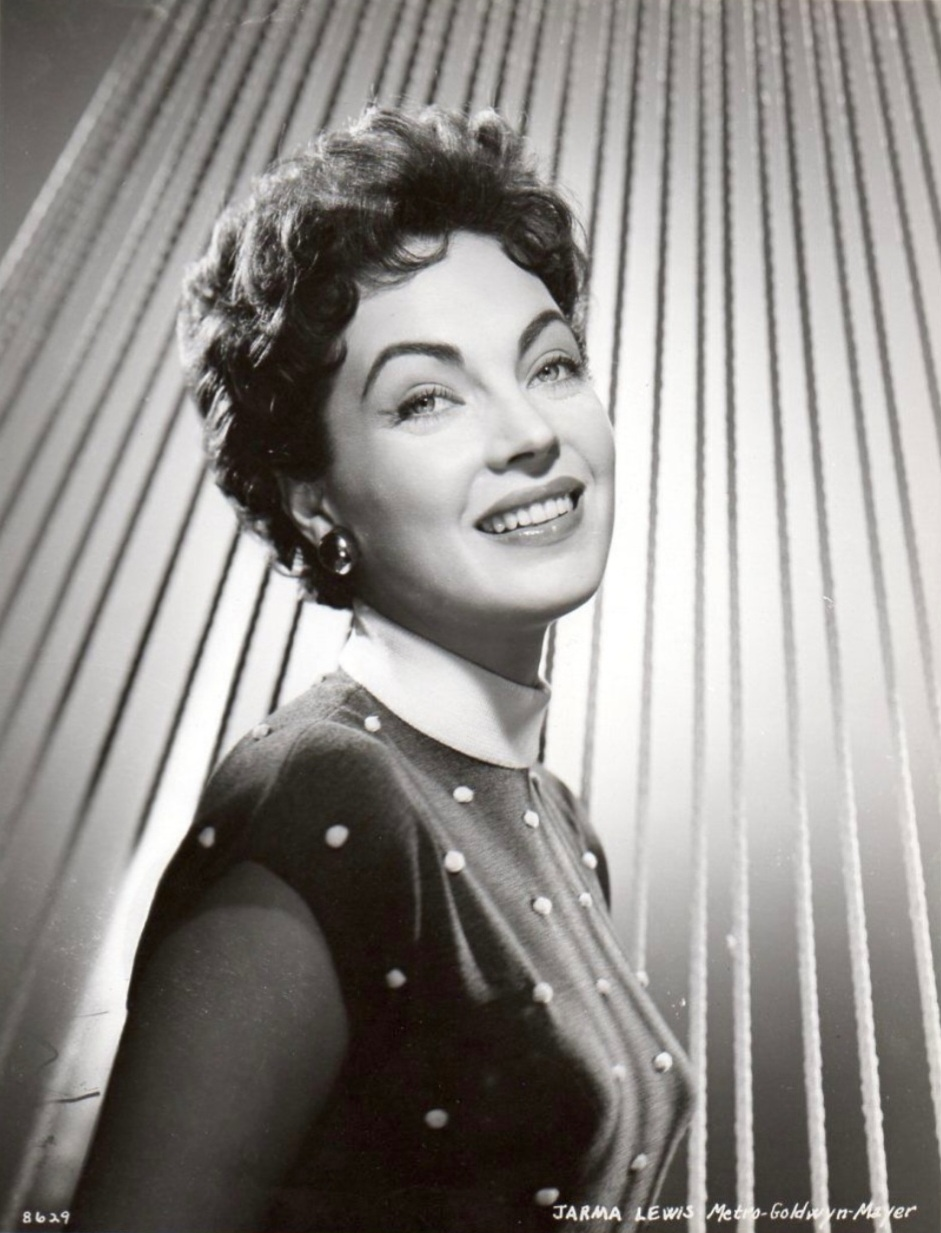
- Lewis in the 1950s
- Born: Jarma Toy Lewis; June 5, 1931; Tuscaloosa, Alabama, U.S.
- Died: November 12, 1985 (aged 54); Los Angeles, California, U.S.
- Occupations: Actress; model
- Years active: 1952–1957
- Spouse: Benjamin Edward Bensinger III (m. 1955; div. 1984)
- Children: 3

Jarma Toy Lewis (June 5, 1931 – November 12, 1985) was an American film actress and model active in the 1950s.

== Biography ==
Jarma Lewis came from a family of Anglo-Irish ancestry, attended Los Angeles City College. She first appeared in school theater productions and received her acting training at the Neighborhood Playhouse School in New York.

In the early 1950s, she played her first film roles. Lewis worked as a receptionist at a Beverly Hills dentist's office and was discovered by director Henry Hathaway, who cast her to play Queen Guinevere in his knight film Prince Valiant. She was subsequently employed as a starlet and up-and-coming actress at 20th Century Fox (1954) and MGM (1955-57). Together with Taina Elg and Luana Leeshe she was one of the youngest performers signed to MGM at the time. She first worked with directors such as Curt Siodmak, Otto Preminger, Stanley Donen, Richard Thorpe, and later with Vincente Minnelli and Edward Dmytryk. Lewis was seen in different genres such as comedy, thriller, crime, drama, and historical films.

Lewis has also had episode roles in a number of TV series and guest appearances on TV shows.

Lewis turned to writing in the 1970s and served on the board of directors of the UCLA Art Council for 15 years. She died in November 1985 at the age of 54 at her home in Beverly Hills.

== Personal life ==
In November 1955, she married the industrial magnate Benjamin Edward Bensinger III, whose family had made its fortune by selling and installing bowling alleys. The couple honeymooned in South America and then settled in Los Angeles. The marriage, which ended in divorce in October 1984, produced three sons.

== Filmography ==
=== Feature films ===
- Raintree County (1957) as Barbara Drake
- The Conqueror (1956) as Girl in bath
- The Tender Trap (1955) as Jessica [Collins]
- Women's Prison (1955) as Prisoner
- The Cobweb (1955) as Lois Y. Demuth
- It's a Dog's Life (1955) as Mabel Maycroft
- The Marauders (1955) as Hannah Ferber
- The Prodigal (1955) as Uba
- Woman's World (1954) as Woman in bargain basement
- Prince Valiant (1954) as Queen Guinevere
- River of No Return (1954) as Dancer
- The French Line (1954) as Model
- Seven Brides for Seven Brothers (1954) as Lem's girlfriend
- The Magnetic Monster (1953) as Stewardess
- April in Paris (1953) as Chorine
- The WAC from Walla Walla (1952) as Specialist

=== Television ===
- Alfred Hitchcock Presents (1957) (Season 2 Episode 19: "A Bottle of Wine") as Grace Connors
