= Andrew Koenig =

American actor and film editor (1968–2010)

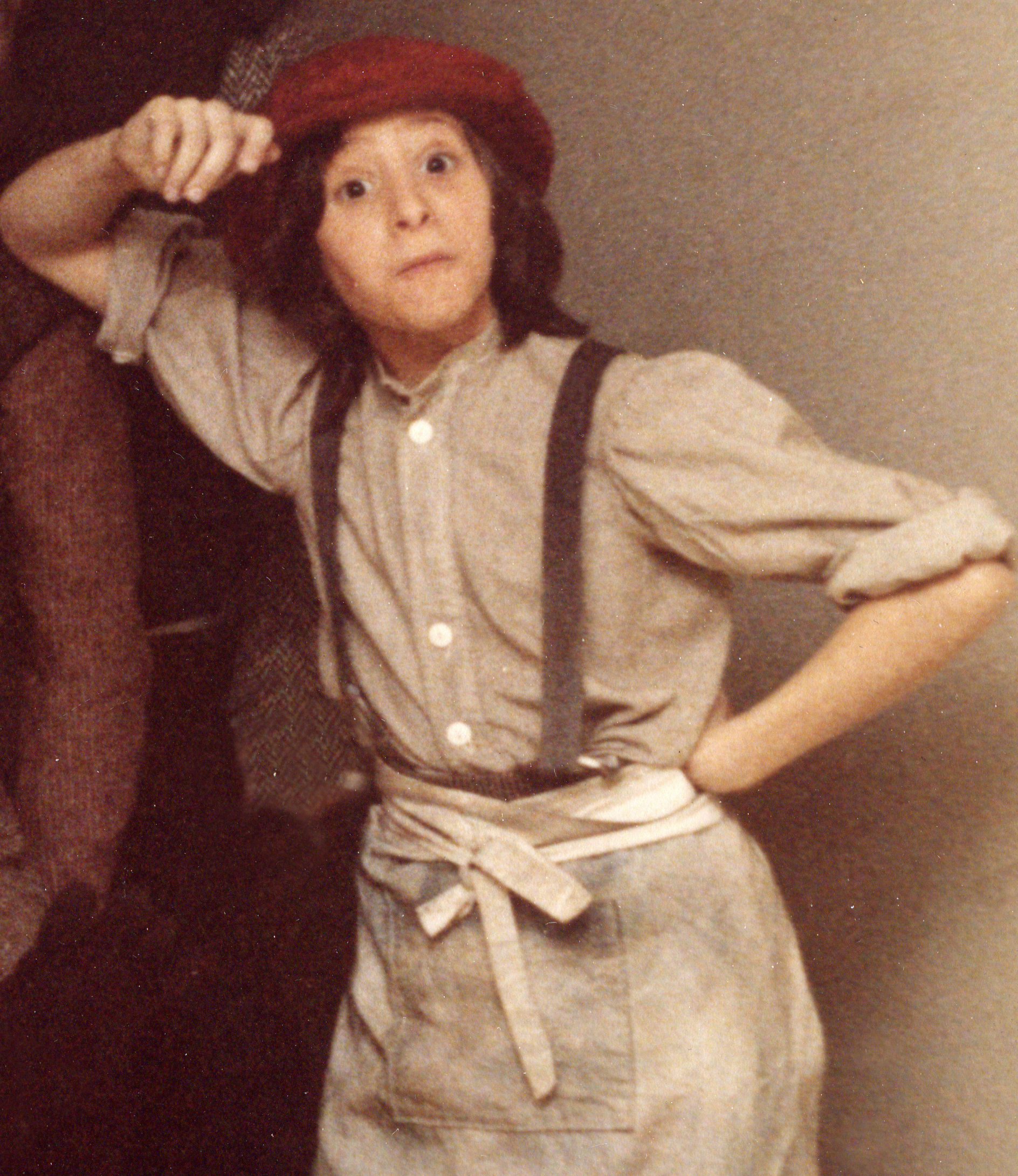
- Koenig in 1982 as the Page Boy in Falstaff
- Born: Joshua Andrew Koenig; August 17, 1968; Los Angeles, California, U.S.
- Died: c. February 16, 2010 (aged 41); Vancouver, British Columbia, Canada
- Body discovered: February 25, 2010; Stanley Park, downtown Vancouver
- Resting place: Hollywood Forever Cemetery
- Education: University of Southern California
- Occupations: Actor; director; editor; writer
- Years active: 1973–2010
- Father: Walter Koenig
- Relatives: Jimmy Pardo (brother-in-law)

Joshua Andrew Koenig (/ˈkeɪnɪɡ/; August 17, 1968 – c. February 16, 2010) was an American character actor, film director, editor, writer, and human rights activist. He was known for his role as Richard "Boner" Stabone in Growing Pains.

== Early life ==
Andrew Koenig was born August 17, 1968, the son of Star Trek actor Walter Koenig and Judy Levitt. He was Jewish.

Writer Harlan Ellison spoke of the young Koenig as being the inspiration for his story "Jeffty Is Five."

I had been awed and delighted by Josh Koenig, and I instantly thought of just such a child who was arrested in time at the age of five. Jeffty, in no small measure, is Josh: the sweetness of Josh, the intelligence of Josh, the questioning nature of Josh.

The story went on to win the 1977 Nebula Award and the 1978 Hugo Award for Best Short Story.

== Career ==
From 1985 to 1989, Koenig played a recurring role as Richard "Boner" Stabone, best friend to Kirk Cameron's character Mike Seaver in the first four seasons of the ABC sitcom Growing Pains. During the same period, he guest starred on episodes of the sitcoms My Sister Sam and My Two Dads as well as the drama 21 Jump Street. In the early 1990s, he provided a voice for the animated series G.I. Joe as Ambush and Night Creeper Leader, and had a minor role as Tumak in the 1993 Star Trek: Deep Space Nine episode “Sanctuary.”

Koenig played the role of The Joker in the 2003 fan film Batman: Dead End.

Onstage, he played the Page Boy in the eight performances of Verdi's Falstaff, a production of the Los Angeles Philharmonic conducted by Carlo Maria Giulini at the Dorothy Chandler Pavilion in Los Angeles, California, in April 1982. As an adult, he starred as the M.C. in the 2007 interactive theater play The Boomerang Kid and performed with the improv group Charles Whitman Reilly and Friends.

Though he continued his performing career in the 2006 independent film, The Theory of Everything (2006), Koenig worked increasingly behind the scenes. He wrote, produced and/or directed the shorts Good Boy (2003) and Woman in a Green Dress and Instinct vs. Reason (2004). He worked as an editor on a number of films and was a video producer for the podcast Never Not Funny (2006–2010). His final role was in the film DaZe: Vol. Too — NonSeNse, in post-production at the time of his death, with Koenig portraying the role of Vice Chancellor.

== Personal life ==
Koenig was an important part of the nonviolent direct action community in Venice Beach that focused on environmental protection during the 1990s. Koenig, a vegan, traveled to Burma in July 2007 and visited Burmese refugee camps in Thailand with his father as part of the U.S. Campaign for Burma. The following January, he protested the People's Republic of China's political and financial support of the military dictatorship in Burma during the 119th Tournament of Roses in Pasadena, California; after a pre-parade human rights march agreed to by parade officials was allegedly stifled by them, he entered the parade and stood in front of a Chinese float promoting the 2008 Beijing Olympics. Koenig, who carried a sign reading "China: Free Burma" in both English and Chinese, was arrested and briefly held for his act of civil disobedience. Koenig's defense attorney was Bill Paparian, a fellow protester and former mayor of Pasadena.

"China sits on the UN Security Council and they have refused to condemn Burma. China purchases gas from Burma and sells them weapons that the military uses on the Burmese people. So they are really quite complicit, and that was the whole point of protesting the China float," Koenig explained. Koenig also noted the Chinese government's implicit support of the genocide in Sudan, sweatshops and tainted export products, saying of the float, "China is putting on a good face because of the Olympics, but [it's time to] send a message to the Chinese government that they have to not just change their face, but change the way they do things." The Pasadena Weekly quoted Koenig as stating, "Their free speech rights have been totally censored. As a country with a Constitution and a Bill of Rights, we need to continue to support and enforce ours, and [use it to] recognize the rights of human beings all over the world.”

=== Death ===
Koenig was last seen in Vancouver, British Columbia, on February 14, 2010, and missed a scheduled flight on February 16, which was the last day he used his cell phone or conducted any banking. On February 25, a group of friends and family found him dead in Vancouver's Stanley Park; he had apparently hanged himself. Koenig was 41 years old.

== Filmography ==
Year	Title	Role	Notes
1973	Adam-12	Little Boy	Episode: "Rampart Division: The Senior Citizens" (uncredited)
1985–1989	Growing Pains	Richard "Boner" Stabone	25 episodes
1987	My Sister Sam	Mr. Rudnick	Episode: "Go Crazy"
1988	21 Jump Street	Wally	Episode: "Champagne High"
1989	My Two Dads	Jon	Episode: "You Can Count on Me"
1990	G.I. Joe: A Real American Hero	Ambush; Night Creeper Leader; Various Cobra Troopers	(Season 1)
1993	Star Trek: Deep Space Nine	Tumak	Episode: "Sanctuary"
2003	Batman: Dead End	The Joker	Fan film
2006	The Theory of Everything	Scott	Direct to video
2008	InAlienable	Emil	Feature film
2010	DaZe: Vol. Too — NonSeNse	Vice Chancellor	

== See also ==
- List of solved missing person cases (2010s)
