= Sanctuary (Star Trek: Deep Space Nine) =

- Star Trek: Deep Space Nine episode
- Episode no.: Season 2 Episode 10
- Directed by: Les Landau
- Story by: Gabe Essoe; Kelley Miles
- Teleplay by: Frederick Rappaport
- Production code: 430
- Original air date: November 29, 1993

Guest appearances
- Aron Eisenberg as Nog; Deborah May as Haneek; William Schallert as Varani; Andrew Koenig as Tumak; Michael Durrell as Hazar; Betty McGuire as Vayna; Robert Curtis-Brown as Sorad; Kitty Swink as Rozahn; Leland Orser as Gai; Nicholas Shaffer as Cowl

Episode chronology
← Previous "Second Sight"	Next → "Rivals"
- Star Trek: Deep Space Nine season 2

"Sanctuary" is the 30th episode of the American science fiction television series Star Trek: Deep Space Nine, the tenth episode of the second season.

This episode was written by Frederick Rappaport, Gave Essoe, and Kelley Miles, and directed by Les Landau. It aired on November 29, 1993, in broadcast syndication.

Set in the 24th century, the series follows the adventures on Deep Space Nine, a space station located near a stable wormhole between the Alpha and Gamma quadrants of the Milky Way Galaxy, near the planet Bajor. In this episode, alien refugees from the Gamma Quadrant attempt to claim Bajor as their home.

== Plot ==
A damaged vessel comes through the wormhole, and its passengers, a woman and three men, are transported aboard Deep Space Nine. The universal translator is unable to translate their language for several minutes, but they seem to trust Major Kira, who escorts them around the station until they are able to communicate.

The woman, Haneek, explains that her people, the Skrreeans, were conquered by a species called the T-Rogorans, who were, in turn, conquered by an empire known as the Dominion. Commander Sisko promises to help Haneek and her people find a new homeland, and when several more Skrreean ships come through the wormhole, they are welcomed warmly. Kira and Haneek become friends.

As more and more Skrreeans arrive on the station, some residents, including Quark, begin to resent their presence; Quark's nephew Nog pulls a prank on Haneek's belligerent son Tumak and Tumak retaliates with violence. The situation deteriorates into a violent scuffle between Nog and Tumak's group of friends. Haneek begins to fear that she will not find Kentanna, the Skrreeans' long-sought legendary homeworld. However, the Skrreean leaders decide that Bajor is the Kentanna they seek. Sisko suggests a nearby planet, Draylon II, as a reasonable alternative, but the Skrreeans are adamant in their decision. They meet with representatives of the Bajoran government, who refuse to allow them to relocate there; a famine is spreading, and the Bajoran government does not believe it can support the Skrreean population.

Tumak takes one of the Skrreean ships and heads to Bajor. At Sisko's request, Haneek tries to convince him to disengage his engines because the ship has a dangerous radiation leak, but Tumak ignores his mother's pleas. Two Bajoran vessels approach him in order to tow him to safety, but Tumak refuses to shut down his engines. A firefight ensues, resulting in the destruction of Tumak's ship due to the radiation leak.

The Bajoran government maintains its decision to refuse asylum, so the Skrreeans have no choice but to move to Draylon II. Hurt over her son's death and angry with the Bajorans, Haneek's final words to Kira are bitter. She reminds Kira that the Skrreeans were farmers, and could have helped Bajor overcome the famine. Haneek departs with her people, leaving Kira ashamed, contemplating Haneek's words.

== Notes ==
- This episode marks the second time that the Dominion is referenced, and the first time officers of the United Federation of Planets hear of it; the Dominion will go on to play a major role in the narrative of the series.
- Andrew Koenig (Tumak) was the son of actor Walter Koenig, who played Pavel Chekov in Star Trek: The Original Series and the first seven Star Trek films.
- William Schallert (Varani) also played Federation official Nilz Baris in the episode The Trouble with Tribbles of The Original Series.
- Kitty Swink (Minister Rozhan) is married to Armin Shimerman (Quark).

== Reception ==
Reviewing the episode for Tor.com in 2013, Keith R.A. DeCandido gave it a rating of 5 out 10, saying there was "plenty to like" about the episode but also expressing disappointment with several aspects of it, including the ending.

In 2020, io9 listed this as one of the "must-watch" episodes of the series.

== Releases ==
It was released on LaserDisc in Japan on June 6, 1997, as part of the half season collection 2nd Season Vol. 1, which had 7 doubled sided 12" discs. The discs had English and Japanese audio tracks.

On November 11, 1997, "Second Sight" and "Sanctuary" were released on double sided LaserDisc in the United States.

On April 1, 2003, Season 2 of Star Trek: Deep Space Nine was released on DVD video discs, with 26 episodes on seven discs.

This episode was released in 2017 on DVD with the complete series box set, which had 176 episodes on 48 discs.
