= The Alfred Hitchcock Hour season 10 =

The Alfred Hitchcock Hour, known as Alfred Hitchcock Presents from 1955 to 1962 (seasons 1–7), aired 29 episodes during its 10th and final season from 1964 to 1965.

== Episodes ==
No. overall	No. in season	Title	Directed by	Written by	Stars	Original release date
333	1	"The Return of Verge Likens"	Arnold Laven	Davis Grubb (story); James Bridges (teleplay)	Peter Fonda as Verge Likens, Robert Emhardt as Riley McGrath	October 5, 1964
Verge Likens (Fonda) is a farmer whose father, Stoney (Barrat), is shot and killed by a crooked politician named Riley McGrath (Emhardt) in front of Riley's driver D.D. Martin (Lindsey), tavernkeeper Fred Starcher (Bramley), and Riley's female friend Mary Masterson (Merchant). County Sheriff Reynolds (Boles) stops by the Likens Farm to inform Verge and brother Wilford (Reese) of Stoney's death. Rush says that it was self-defense, as Stoney had bottles in his hand, but Verge insists that Stoney never carried a gun, so it could only be murder. After selling their produce, Verge throws the Likens' remaining apples through the bar's windows and is arrested. Aunt Ida Maye (Westman) and Aunt Mary Jane (Walker) arrive to look after the farm and cook meals. After spending some time in jail, Verge returns home to avenge his father's death, promising Wilford after Stoney's funeral that he kill Riley. Verge tails Riley for a month to determine his schedule and routine, even learning that he has a bad heart. Wilford goes to see Riley and tells him that Stoney was his father and Verge keeps speaking of killing Riley. Wilford gives Riley the Likens Farm address and Riley gives Wilford five hundred dollars cash. Riley gives Verge the money, and Verge decides to go to Charleston to learn how to kill Riley "real slow". He sends Riley a "rest in peace" laurel to Riley's office, so Riley has D.D. drive out to the Likens Farm, but Verge has been gone for six months, so D.D. takes Wilford for a drive to Fred's tavern instead. Riley asks numerous questions about Verge to Wilford, but Wilford plays dumb. D.D. takes Wilford out to the car but beats him looking for information. Verge returns and manages to get close to Riley by getting hired as an assistant at the barbershop of Rush Sigafoose (Seel), which resides next door to the McGrath Building where Riley works. After asking the barber to run an errand looking for towels and some bay rum, Verge is alone with Riley and proceeds to lather up the murdering politician for a shave, with Verge initially claiming to be named Odell Jones. Verge vividly describes how he is planning to cut Riley's throat. When the barber returns to the barbershop, he finds the door locked and gets the police. Verge finally opens the door and the sheriff rushes to Riley's now dead body. Verge has avenged his father's death, but he is not guilty of a crime; Riley died of a heart attack, though with a first-class shave. Supporting Cast: Sam Reese as Wilford Likens, Jim Boles as Sheriff Reynolds, George Lindsey as D.D. Martin, William Bramley as Fred Starcher, Robert Barrat as Stoney Likens, Charles Seel as Rush Sigafoose, June Walker as Aunt Mary Jane, Nydia Westman as Aunt Ida Maye, Cathie Merchant as Mary Masterson
334	2	"Change of Address"	David Friedkin	Andrew Benedict (story); Morton S. Fine, David Friedkin (teleplay)	Arthur Kennedy as Keith Hollands, Phyllis Thaxter as Elsa Hollands	October 12, 1964
Over the protests of his wife Elsa (Thaxter), Keith Hollands (Kennedy) rents a beach house from landlord Mr. Miley (Dano). Elsa dislikes the house, and she is frightened when a bird flies into the window and breaks it and is further disturbed by her husband's digging of a grave-like hole in the cellar. She is still upset with Keith about him injuring her hip on a prior excursion and believes that he wants to hurt her again. When Keith tells Elsa that he wants to buy the house, she decides to foil his plan by contacting the wife of the current owner to tell her not to sell. Keith goes to speak with Mr. Miley, and Miley and secretary Reba (Davis) have a good laugh at Elsa's disturbed nature. Keith takes Elsa out to a club for youth, and local girl Rachel (Sterling) is there dancing with a young man (Blodgett), which both notice. Elsa tells Keith that it is possible that she wants what he does as well, to be free of each other, and she slaps him as she declares her loathing for the beach house and their new life. Elsa leaves the club without him, so he takes the opportunity to leave with Rachel. Keith gradually grows angry with Elsa accusing him of "trying to be a twenty-year-old" and being so uncompromising about his desire to live youthfully in the beach house. She is distraught when she finds out that Keith is discreetly seeing Rachel, whom Elsa had thought might be a good friend for her. He kills Elsa and buries her body in the cellar hole, cementing it over with his initials and handprint before paying a $5,000 deposit to Miley to buy the house, saying that Elsa left him after a bad fight. He is surprised when the Police Sergeant Bryant (Karnes) and Officers Raymo (Lessing) and Felton suddenly arrive a couple days later with shovels and want to dig up the basement. The police tell Keith that Elsa discovered the wife of the house's owner, Mr. Wilson, was missing, so she tipped off the police and they began an investigation. They called the house's owner in for questioning, and he confessed to murdering his wife and burying her in the basement of the beach house. The police are at the beach house to dig up the basement so that they can find the body. Supporting Cast: Royal Dano as Mr. Miley, Tisha Sterling as Rachel, Robert Karnes as Sergeant Bryant, Susan Davis as Reba, Arnold Lessing as Officer Raymo, Michael Blodgett as Dancer (Apollo) Note: The actor who played Officer Felton is uncredited and currently unknown.
335	3	"Water's Edge"	Bernard Girard	Robert Bloch (short story); Alfred Hayes (teleplay)	Ann Sothern as Helen Cox, John Cassavetes as Rusty Connors	October 19, 1964
Rusty Connors (Cassavetes) is a con man serving time with cellmate Mike Krause (Barnes), a robber and murderer who killed his partner, Pete Taylor, and then hid both the money ($56,000) and his partner's body. Rusty is near the end of his time served, but Mike is only two years into a ten-year sentence. Despite worries from a guard (Brown) and orderly (Joyce) regarding Mike's chronic cough, Rusty and Mike discuss Mike's wife, Helen (Sothern), and his ideal life that he lost. Mike soon dies as he was beaten often and suffered greatly in prison. The money and the body have never turned up, and upon Rusty's release, he decides to look up Helen in pursuit of the stolen loot. Rusty gets to Mike's hometown and speaks with a newsstand dealer (Fresco) about the local hotspots before setting off to find Helen. Rusty stumbles upon Helen working as a restaurant waitress and mentions that he has a message for her from Mike, hoping that she knows where the money is. When they meet later in a local park, she does not have a clue, noting that even the police looked for an entire year to no avail. Rusty romances Helen on the pretense of being lonely, though his heart seeks the money (and she seems more oriented towards wealth than love as well). Eventually, through logically defining the time period of the robbery night, they are able to figure out that the money is stored in an abandoned boathouse, which is now infested with rats. Rusty even figures out that Mike got bit by a rat that night, as he used a razor to purposefully cut his arm to cover the blood evidence all over the car. In the boathouse, they find the money and the skeleton of Krause's partner in the attic. When Rusty sees the money, he is overcome with greed and tries to murder Helen, but she manages to knock him out when he bends down to pick up a rock with which to hit her. When Rusty awakens, he finds himself bound and gagged and being taunted by Helen, who has been playing not only him the entire time but also Mike as well; she even admits to having an affair with Pete for six months prior to the robbery. She gets up to leave with the money but is tricked and tripped by Rusty and is impaled on a hook. As she dies, the scent of her blood attracts the rats. Since Rusty is bound, all he can do is listen with horror as the rats approach to kill him by eating him alive. Supporting Cast: Rayford Barnes as Mike Krause, Jimmy Joyce as Ed the Prison Orderly, David Fresco as Newsstand Dealer, James Brown (credited as J.B. Brown) as Prison Guard
336	4	"The Life Work of Juan Diaz"	Norman Lloyd	Ray Bradbury (teleplay/story)	Alejandro Rey as Juan Diaz, Frank Silvera as Alejandro	October 26, 1964
Juan Diaz (Rey) is dying and penniless; his last wish is that he can provide financial security for his family. Local gravedigger Alejandro (Silvera) takes tourists (Pope, Lindsey, Swanson, Barnes) on tours of the local cemetery to look at mummies while Juan jokes with Ignacia the coffin maker (Montoya) about whether Juan has a skull with Ignacia's name on it. Juan, however, soon collapses and breaks all his skulls while wife Maria (Pellicer) and son Jorge (Domasin) try to help. With Maria and Jorge searching for medicine, Juan rents a grave from Alejandro for two years at forty pesos total payment. Alejandro takes Juan on a tour of the catacombs, where Alejandro keeps those who cannot keep paying the rent needed to stay buried. The bodies stay greatly mummified because of the dried earth of the region of Mexico. When Juan tries to leave the catacombs, he collapses and soon after dies on October 25, 1962 in front of his three children (Alonzo). Only about a year after his death, on October 30, 1963, Alejandro attempts to solicit more money from Maria, leading Maria to seek out her brother, Ricardo, who is the chief of police. Ricardo is unsuccessful at convincing Alejandro to have mercy. Alejandro exhumes Juan's corpse to make room in the cemetery and has it mummified and stored in a crypt with a number of other mummies in the catacombs. Jorge is dared by local children (Miranda, Arias, Acosta, Sandoval) to go into the catacombs and view his father's body, and he brings it a rose. Maria and Jorge sneak into the catacombs late at night and hide while Alejandro drunkenly taunts the mummies. They use Juan's body to scare away drunken Alejandro, who was frightened by Jorge blowing out matches that Alejandro believed to be the act of Juan. The next day, Alejandro accuses of stealing Juan's mummy, but Maria claims the mummy in her house to be a paper macher toy that she made. Maria hangs Juan's body in the house and tells tourists that it is an authentic Mexican mummy. Money from the tourists pays for food and clothing for Maria and her three children. Eventually, however, Maria is overcome by the ghoulishness of what she has done. She begs for forgiveness, but a gleam in the eyes of the corpse's body reveals that Juan approves of what she has done. Supporting Cast: Pina Pellicer as Maria Diaz, Valentin de Vargas as Chief of Police Ricardo, Larry Domasin as Jorge Diaz, Alex Montoya as Ignacia the Coffin Maker, Yolanda Alonzo as Ramona (Juan's Second Child), Mark Miranda as Pepe the First Boy, Hinton Pope as Man, Audrey Swanson as Second Woman, Gale Lindsey as First Woman, Suzanne Barnes as Third Woman, Vincent Arias as Second Boy, Carmelita Acosta as First Girl, Concepcion Sandoval as First Child
337	5	"See the Monkey Dance"	Joseph M. Newman	Lewis Davidson	Roddy McDowall as George, Efrem Zimbalist Jr. as Stranger	November 9, 1964
England. While George (McDowall) is headed to see his girlfriend (Medina) via train, he takes an opportunity to make a phone call to her when the conductor (Pelling) announces a short stop. When George returns to his private car, he meets a mysterious limping stranger (Zimbalist) who annoys him greatly at first and later makes him fear for his life. The stranger, a physicist, is prone to becoming hysterical and travels with a revolver. They figure out that they both traveling to the same caravan on the same farm outside a little town. Upon arriving at their destination caravan, the stranger begins digging a grave as George demands that the stranger leaves. George finally realizes that the stranger is his girlfriend's jealous husband. The stranger tells George that she has done this sort of thing before and that he tried, but failed, to kill his wife's last lover, as his inexperienced shot only injured the man's leg and gave him a limp as well. George and the stranger discuss whether George wrote an incriminating letter, and the stranger almost shoots him when a little girl (Barnath) stops by on behalf of her father who owns the farm. They figure out that the stranger's wife arranged this meeting between them with hope that George would kill her husband. The stranger convinces George to plot revenge and tells him to tamper with the steering of his wife's car. When the woman arrives, the woman threatens the stranger while George tampers with the car. The woman then dies driving at high speed on a steep hill on the nearby road. George discovers to his dismay, however, that the limping stranger was really his girlfriend's former lover, not husband, and that he used George to get his revenge on her. George is left alone trying to desperately cover up the evidence (the grave, the car grease, fingerprints, the hammer, and the wing nut), and he just about gets the grave filled when the police arrive. Supporting Cast: Patricia Medina as Wife, George Pelling as Conductor, Shari Lee Barnath as the Little Williams Girl
338	6	"Lonely Place"	Harvey Hart	Francis Gwaltney	Teresa Wright as Stella, Pat Buttram as Emory, Bruce Dern as Jesse	November 16, 1964
Stella (Wright), a loving woman with a pet squirrel, is married to a cowardly peach farmer named Emory (Buttram) who hires a passing hobo named Jesse (Dern) to help harvest the peach crop in exchange for room, board, and three dollars per day (half the going rate). Unfortunately, Jesse's strange behavior and fascination with a knife that he carries begins to frighten her, but Emory refuses to believe her and doesn't want to risk losing a cheap hired hand. Jesse even kills Stella's pet squirrel for his sheer delight, claiming that he had to because animals always take a dislike to him for some reason. He eventually confesses to Emory that he just loves killing animals, and Emory admits that he was annoyed that Stella looked after the squirrel instead of spending more time on him. Emory tells Jesse that he only married Stella in order to have someone to feed him, but he tells Stella that it was "man talk" and he has been faithful to her. When Emory takes the truckload of peaches to market, Jesse admits to Stella that he also loves being scary towards women, which is why he loves torturing her. Stella packs her belongings and tries to run away by sneaking out the window while the radio plays music, but she is caught by Jesse and screams for help. As a thunderstorm approaches, he rants about his poor wages and tries to get Stella to scream for his delight, which he hopes will get Emory to come outside so that he can kill him. He threatens to stab her, but she fights him off and escapes into the orchard. After she manages to gain control of his knife, he flees in Emory's truck. She goes back to the house and promises the sleeping Emory that she will be a good wife, she then awakens Emory and tells him about Jesse, but he refuses to call the police as he heard the radio warning about the hailstorm. She realizes that he heard her screams, and he admits that he was too afraid to do anything because he would have been killed and she could "take it a little more". Stella angrily stabs Emory and kills him, and then she calls police officer Oscar and blames the murder on the fleeing Jesse. Casting Note: The actor who voiced Oscar the police officer is uncredited and currently unknown.
339	7	"The McGregor Affair"	David Friedkin	David Friedkin	Andrew Duggan as John McGregor, Elsa Lanchester as Aggie McGregor	November 23, 1964
Edinburgh, Scotland, March 1827. A vendor (Macollum) shouts about his wares as John McGregor (Duggan) attempts to take care of his alcoholic wife Aggie (Lanchester), a whiskey addict who has not been outside for over two years. John reminisces to himself about Aggie as a beautiful lass and how he has no one to talk to. John works for Dr. Knox (Hoyt) and must lug large boxes of tanbark to his medical academy from two men named Burke (Malet) and Hare (Pate). Knox's assistants Becker (Beckley) and Jarmley (Macready) help carry the boxes into Knox's laboratory, as it is revealed that Knox runs a medical school, and the boxes contain bodies of the deceased. After leaving, John is confronted by local match-seller Elsie Muldoon (Harford), who desires for some of the whiskey that John has bought for Aggie. John confronts Aggie for her crude meanness towards him, as he buys her whiskey, puts straw in her bed, and cooks her sausages for nothing in return, as Aggie refuses to even let him sip on the whiskey. The next day, John sits by a pond to think about what to do with Aggie when Elsie and boyfriend Tommy (Smith) stop by for a brief chat, and John thinks that he will be better off if Aggie was dead. That night, John learns that the boxes actually contain the murdered victims of Burke and Hare, who are in fact body snatchers and murderers, when Elsie's hair sticks out of the corner of a box. John is almost caught with the body when Tommy arrives looking for Elsie, but John claims that it is just tanbark and delivers it to Dr. Knox. John decides to get rid of Aggie by getting her drunk and leaving her on the body snatchers' doorstep. When he drops her off, Hare and Burke are having a party with local women Rosie (Bristol) and Glynis (Harper). After returning home, he is soon visited by Tommy, who still cannot find Elsie, and John works to convince Tommy that Elsie would become completely undesirable when she gets her hooks into him and that he should forget her. Tommy soon leaves when he hears another match wench (Gray) singing her song to sell matches. The plan is successful, but John is soon overtaken by remorse, even though the local bartender Glencannon (Dillon) attempts to cheer him up. John consoles himself that Elsie's death will help make a good surgeon and invites the new match wench to his house, though he upsets her when he forces her off Aggie's bed. John gets drunk and visits Dr. Knox to make a goodbye to Elsie, but Knox rejects him and states that it was just tanbark. He goes to the tavern and gets further drunk, but Burke and Hare take him away and have another box delivered to Knox. Unfortunately, John ends up being Burke and Hare's next victim and is himself the body inside this final box. Supporting Cast: William Smith as Tommy Lad, Betty Harford as Elsie Muldoon, John Hoyt as Dr. Knox, Arthur Malet as Burke, Michael Pate as Hare, William Beckley as Becker, Michael Macready as Jarmley, Iris Bristol as Rosie, Harriet Harper as Glynis, Brendan Dillon as Glencannon the Bartender, Janine Gray as The Wench, Barry Macollum as The Vendor
340	8	"Misadventure"	Joseph M. Newman	Lewis Davidson	Barry Nelson as Colin, Lola Albright as Eva Martin, George Kennedy as George Martin	December 7, 1964
An outsider, Colin, befriends a woman, Eva Martin (Albright), who is bent on murdering her husband George (Kennedy). Eva Martin cooks breakfast when she receives a phone call from her boyfriend Bruce (Bregan), and she tells husband George that it was a wrong number. He wants to come home for lunch, but her boyfriend said that he would be in later, so she says that she is going out shopping to keep George away. As he is leaving, gas man Colin arrives, but he loosens the downstairs meter to allow gas to escape rather than fix any issue and gaslights her about there being any problem. She attempts to call the gas company, but he begs her not to report him and shows her a picture of his family. He claims that his odd behavior is the result of a reoccurrence of malaria that he caught during the war. However, when he tries to pick up his workman's toolchest, a revolver slips out, but he manages to hide it before Eva can see it. He asks Eva to let him take a hot shower, which he says will cure his bout, but instead he slips out of his work clothes and lies down in her bed in his briefs. She tries to get him to dress and leave when Bruce suddenly arrives; she scares him away by mentioning that George is returning soon. She threatens to call the gas company and police, and Colin tells her to call George as well. Colin reveals that he has been watching Eva and Bruce for weeks and has pictures of the two of them together, which he shows her. Colin says that he is not after money as he admires her beauty and is madly in love with her. After a romantic and intimate interlude, he cries while talking about the jealousy he has for Bruce and how he wants to kill both Bruce and George. He even outlines how he would disconnect the gas valve so that it couldn't be fixed, and George would die of accidental death by misadventure when combined with his asthma. Colin reveals that he is a private detective hired by George to get enough evidence for divorce. He says that he would do anything for her, so she presses him to carry out his plan to murder George. George soon comes home to find a number of broken dishes and Colin waiting for him, and it is revealed that they are in fact brothers (through their shared father) who have not seen each other in five years. Colin shows George a picture of his family and tells him that his oldest son died of appendicitis, which he blames on George for not giving him money. Colin broke the China dishware that their father left to George and then pulls out the revolver demanding his share of their father's money. George defiantly says no, so Colin decides to leave, but not before saying that he got rid of Eva down in the basement. When George enters the gas-filled basement to look for Eva, the doorknob falls off, trapping George. Eva comes home to Colin telling her not to worry that he had to actually hit George, leaving some blood in the kitchen, which he says that he cleaned up. Her ranting leads him to slap her, and she tries to call the police before he hangs up the phone. He reminds her that she took the screw out of the doorknob and released the gas valve, so she would be the one found guilty of murder. She makes a phony call to George's work and then calls the police about George supposedly missing. Colin suddenly claims that he cannot find the pictures of Eva and Bruce, and he tricks her into going into the basement to look for them. Colin then calls the police while claiming to be George in order to cancel the drive-by, all while Eva chokes on the fumes in the basement. Supporting Cast: Michael Bregan as Bruce the Boyfriend
341	9	"Triumph"	Harvey Hart	Arthur A. Ross	Ed Begley as Brother Thomas Fitzgibbons, Jeanette Nolan as Mary Fitzgibbons	December 14, 1964
A woman, Lucy, comes between a phony medical missionary, Thomas, and his partner Mary. Brother Thomas Fitzgibbons (Begley) and wife Mary welcome Brother John Sprague (Simcox) and wife Lucy (Pierce) to their missionary society and clinic while workers like Ramna (Wyenn) and others (Scott) work to keep the camp running properly. Thomas is proud to bring quinine to the native population while Mary mostly complains about the insects and tough living. Mary works behind the scenes to prop up Thomas' reputation and doesn't want anyone intruding, while Thomas sees John as an honest man who wants the best. Mary reminds Thomas that his main desire in life is fame and reputation within the missionary society, so Thomas cannot trust the newcomers. The next day, Lucy goes for a swim in the river, but Thomas yells that it is dangerous due to rampant disease and animal attacks. Over lunch, they discuss the nature of human beings and whether people are different and can progress or not. Mary goes to the local market with John while Lucy helps Thomas treat the natives, to Mary's dismay. Mary and John return to report an outbreak of cholera, and John goes to treat the infected, to Lucy's dismay. That night, a native is attacked by a jungle cat, and Mary must perform the surgery. Afterward, Lucy speaks with Thomas about how John only sees the good in people and is blind to all else, and she convinces Thomas to take her on a boat ride where they speak of vengeance and slavery to dispassionate loves. Thomas says that if her were Lucy's husband, he would praise only her beauty, which she greatly longs for. Upon returning, Mary lambasts Thomas for falling for Lucy and John's zeal, but Thomas calculates that Mary hates Lucy because she is young and beautiful. Later that night, Mary takes a scalpel to Lucy's room and attacks her. John returns and is told by the native workers that Lucy died of cholera, with the Fitzgibbons heartbroken and gone. John angrily grills the Indian employee about the whereabouts of Lucy's grave and how she could have died from cholera in just one day. Ramna and the other employee take John to the gravesite, and John digs to discover the truth. John then forces the employee to take him the Fitzgibbons' location, where the employee begs John not to kill Mary. John replies that this is rightful vengeance and shoots both Thomas twice and the woman twice, but when he removes her veil, he finds that it is Lucy that he just killed instead. Supporting Cast: Maggie Pierce as Mrs. Lucy Sprague, Tom Simcox as Brother John Sprague, Than Wyenn as Ramna, Tony Scott as Indian Employee Note: The actor who played the travel authority is uncredited and currently unknown.
342	10	"Memo from Purgatory"	Joseph Pevney	Harlan Ellison	James Caan as Jay Shaw, Tony Musante as Candle, Walter Koenig as Tiger	December 21, 1964
A young author, Jay Shaw (Caan), joins a gang to collect material for his latest book. Jay narrates saving money to write a book on youth gangs in New York under the false identity of Phil Beldone. He visits a malt shop hangout for gangs, where the Barons gang views him suspiciously, even though the owner Ben (Silver) requests that they take it easy on him. Jay almost gets into a knife fight with Candle (Musante) and Fish (King), the vice president, until Tiger (Koenig) intervenes, as Jay demands to speak with Tiger, who is president, about joining. Slats (Slade) and Cherry (Palmer) joke about the three-part initiation process while Filene (Loring) develops a crush on Jay. The first part of the initiation involves a gauntlet of belt buckles being used to beat the invitee, and Ski (Courtney) and Trooper (Lamont) especially enjoys the prospect of beating Jay. Jay, however, outsmarts the gauntlet participants, grabbing one member and using him as a weapon to get past the others. Later, Filene volunteers to go to Jay's room and offers to be his woman, but she admits that she reports on what they do to others as this is the second part of the initiation, so they stage a romantic interlude. She reveals that the third part involves killing someone, which must be done or the invitee while get killed instead. Jay is ordered by Candle to kill a derelict (Geer), but he refuses, telling the man to run. Candle is about to kill Jay when Tiger arrives, and Jay talks sense into Tiger about committing random murders, which angers Candle greatly, who believes that Tiger favors Jay over him now. Candle and Slats ransack Jay's room and discover Jay's writings on their gang's activity and proof that Jay's mother is from Trenton, not Manhattan as he previously stated. When Jay returns from a date with Filene, they discover that Candle has taken all Jay's saved money, and Jay tells Filene the truth about him being a writer on gangs, as Candle took his writings on raids, biographies, and even sketches of members. Filene angrily calls Jay a square and tells Jay to leave immediately, but the gang is waiting on the other side of the door for Jay. The gang hauls him before a club meeting headed by Tiger, to Candle's delight. Jay admits the truth to Tiger, and they joke about how Jay considers Filene to have changed as clean and lovely. Tiger decides that Jay is a phony and orders him to leave, but Candle demands that Jay must die and tries to convince Tiger being showing him a description of Jay's writings saying that Tiger holds women in contempt and is afraid of the opposite sex. Tiger decides to let rival gang The Flyers handle Jay as punishment. He gives Jay an empty revolver and the gang heads off for a rumble, with Filene shedding tears for Jay. Jay uses a passing truck to charge into a shoe proprietor's shop to stage a robbery, and the proprietor, Ritz (Joyce), pulls a gun and shoots to scare away the others while holding up Jay and calling the police. In court, Jay's defense attorney (Scott) doesn't care about Jay's story, only whether he has money for bail. A jail guard (White) then reveals that his girlfriend posted bail for him, and Filene lures Jay into an alley where Tiger and Candle are waiting. Jay apologizes to Filene before fighting with Candle, and they bump into Filene, causing her to be accidentally stabbed to death by Tiger. Tiger and Candle then attempt to flee but are caught immediately by police, while Jay can only hold Filene's body in despair. Based on Memos from Purgatory by Harlan Ellison Supporting Cast: Lynn Loring as Filene the Girl Gang Member, Johnny Silver as Ben, Chuck Courtney as Ski, Zalman King as Fish, Mark Slade as Slats, Jacquelin Palmer (credited as Jacque Palmer) as Cherry, Michael Lamont as Trooper, Simon Scott as The Defender, Jimmy Joyce as Ritz the Shoe Proprietor, Leonard P. Geer as Derelict, Will J. White as Guard
343	11	"Consider Her Ways"	Robert Stevens	John Wyndham (story); Oscar Millard (teleplay)	Barbara Barrie as Dr. Jane Sumner Waterleigh, Gladys Cooper as Laura	December 28, 1964
A physician, Dr. Jane Waterleigh (Barrie), tries to prevent her vision of an all-female society from coming true. Jane wakes to a doctor (Thompson) and nurse (Bethane) trying to get her released from her room, even though Jane notices herself having a strange physical illness as she is substantially swollen. She is taken out of her room by a chief nurse (Corby) and workers (Gan, King) who refer to her as "Mother", as they say that she just had four babies. Two other women, Mother Daisy (Phillips) and Mother Hazel (Sayer), also went through the same experience and discuss Jane's memory loss, calling her Mother Orcus. The women are brought substantial quantities of food, but Jane just wants a book to read. Jane brings up husbands and men, but the other two mothers claim to have never heard of the concept. Another doctor (Backes) is called in to check on Jane, who makes Jane prove that she can read and write, as well as outline why Jane thinks she is a doctor herself, so Jane states that she was married to a man named Donald, who died in a plane crash, and details her work as an M.D. That night, Jaen tries to escape but is stopped by a Little Servitor (Zaferiou) and arrested for reactionism by an Amazon policewoman (Bruce), although a doctor (Gregg) forbids it and issues a written order to prevent it. Jane tells the doctors that she tried a synthesized version of an experimental drug and believes that she is hallucinating this entire sequence of events. Jane is taken to see Laura (Cooper), the society's senior historian, and she establishes that Jane was born during the presidency of Franklin D. Roosevelt in 1938, but men do not exist any longer. Laura mentions that she has never seen a man in her eighty years of life, but her grandmother used to relate about her lost love. Laura reveals that all men died within one year's time due to an experiment of Dr. Perrigan (Harris), whose desire to wipe out rats led to the extermination of man as well. Laura states that women almost died out as they only knew how to consume, with romance created to push consumption for society's growth. After Perrigan's experiment went awry, only female babies survived, while male babies died. Women used ants to create a four-classed society, with doctors at the top. The doctors push Jane to accept a painless suicide in which a drug will wipe away all of her memory. Jane suddenly awakens in the office of Dr. Hellyer (Erickson), who claims her entire experience was only a reaction to the synthesized drug, but Jane has a terrible feeling that it did actually happen or will happen someday. Jane looks in a directory of scientists and finds Dr. Perrigan's listing, so she decides to visit him and discuss virus mutation. When he refuses to abandon the experiment, she shoots him with a revolver and burns all of his research. Two months later, psychiatrist Max Wilding (Lyons) interviews her, as she is being charged with first-degree murder. Hellyer seeks to help her, as he blames himself for giving her the drug. Wilding wants her to plead insanity, but Jane refuses to accept that it was an insane delusion induced by a powerful narcotic. Jane believes that she saw a potential societal future and worked to prevent that future from ever occurring. Lyons tells Jane, to her horror, that Perrigan's son is also a trained biologist and is going to carry on the research. Supporting Cast: Leif Erickson as Dr. John S. Hellyer, Robert H. Harris as Dr. Robert J. Perrigan, Gene Lyons as Max Wilding, Carmen Phillips as Mother Daisy, Diane Sayer as Mother Hazel, Ellen Corby as Chief Nurse, Alice Backes as Second Doctor, Virginia Gregg as Third Doctor, Ivy Bethune as Nurse, Jennifer Gan (credited as Ginny Gan) as First Worker, Stacy King as Female Worker, Eve Bruce as the Amazon, Penny Zaferiou as the Little Servitor, Dee J. Thompson as First Doctor
344	12	"Crimson Witness"	David Friedkin	David Friedkin	Peter Lawford as Ernest 'Ernie' Mullett, Martha Hyer as Judith 'Judy' Mullett, Julie London as Barbara	January 4, 1965
A playboy, Ernie Mullett (Lawford), loses everything to his hated brother Farnum (Carmel), leading to a reenactment of the story of Cain and Abel. Ernie retrieves some cash from his walk-in safe before flirting with his love interest and secretary Barbara (London), who rejects his advances and calls him out for being a thief, as his financial books never quite balance properly. The boss, Mr. Baldwin (Baxter), has his secretary (Hsueh) call in Ernie to take him to task over his various failings over fifteen years of work and his lack of drive and joy, even when he wins. Baldwin only keeps Ernie on because of his loyalty, and Ernie is dismayed to learn that he is being replaced as plant manager by his hated brother Farnum. That night, Ernie reveals the news to his surprised but uninterested wife, Judy (Hyer), and Ernie fights Farnum, and loses, when he attempts to throw Farnum out of the apartment. Farnum then reveals that he and Judy love each other and she is leaving him that very moment after eight years of marriage. Ernie visits Barbara to spin his tale of woe, and Barbara reminds him that Farnum is self-centered, cunning, calculating, fascinating, and exciting, with Ernie only willing to add that Farnum is very clever. Barbara finally admits to being in love with Farnum, as he opens his heart like most men open a door. She is distraught when Ernie reveals that Farnum is with Judy, but she sees the situation as merely a fling. At work, Ernie gets a new secretary, Madeleine (Moore), who sings Farnum's praises as the most intelligent man she has ever heard. Ernie then visits Farnum to ask about Judy, who considers her to be filled with felicity, but Farnum says he will cover Ernie's indulgences in the money till (which total $2,724). They both agree that Ernie should have killed Farnum when Farnum was fifteen years old and had the chance with a shotgun, but Farnum teases Ernie that he would have missed anyway, as with everything else in life. Later, Farnum offers Ernie his friendship while Ernie desires the insurance policy located in the safe, as Judy is the beneficiary, and Ernie wants to alter that fact. Ernie uses the occasion to spy on Farnum using the new password for the safe, "J-U-D-Y", as it is a letter combination safe. Ernie asks Madeleine out to dinner, and she happily accepts. Then Ernie goes to Farnum's office and strikes him with a metal pipe before dumping him in the safe. At dinner with Madeleine, they speak of her vacation destinations to Hispanic countries over drinks, but he declines to go back to her home for margaritas so that he can return to his former office and stage Farnum's body. The next day, Ernie makes up a story of finding Farnum to detectives Modeer (Comi) and Haskel (Thor), and the police believe it was a robbery as $5,000 is missing, Ernie supposedly did not know the combination, and Ernie had the alibi with Madeleine. Judy begs Ernie to take her back, as she suddenly doesn't see Farnum as a tiger anymore and felt that she was just restless in leaving him. Madeleine enters as Ernie and Judy are embracing to say that Ernie is needed in his old office, where Barbara is waiting to beg him to return to her. The detectives call Ernie in to explain how a rose petal from Ernie's collar managed to find its way into the safe, as Farnum wore a flaming star on the day when he was murdered, while everyone knows that Ernie wore a Gallica maxima rose that day. Supporting Cast: Roger C. Carmel as Farnum Mullett, Joanna Moore as Madeleine, Alan Baxter as Mr. Baldwin, Paul Comi as Detective Modeer, Larry Thor as Detective Haskel, Nancy Hsueh as the Secretary, Paul Micale as the Waiter
345	13	"Where the Woodbine Twineth"	Alf Kjellin	James Bridges	Margaret Leighton as Nell Snyder	January 11, 1965
Nell Snyder's (Leighton) niece, Eva (Baral), claims to be acquainted with "minute people". A preacher (Andre) reads Scripture at a funeral for Captain King Snyder's (Reid) son Amos as mourners Jessie (Fluellen), Suse (Moore), Amos' sister Nell, and Amos' daughter Eva listen. Orphan Eva is shown her new room in Nell's home as she speaks with Nell about her miniature friend Mingo, and then Captain and Nell discuss how and where Eva should be raised. That night, Nell awakens to find Eva gone from the bed, and upon finding her, Eva claims that Mingo has arrived and they are playing hide-and-seek. The next day, Eva tells Suse the story of Mingo's family (Mr. Peppercorn, Sam, Popo) and says that Mingo's family doesn't like Aunt Nell. Later, Nell spies Eva telling stories to Mingo's family, and they argue about whether Mingo and her family are real or not before Eva accuses Nell of making her friends go away. Jesse and Suse argue about whether or not she told him to get a ham out of the food storehouse, and Suse finds Eva hiding there from Nell. Eva is excited to see her grandpa Captain King upon his arrival, and he brings her a black doll that Eva claims is her friend Numa. Eva says that Mingo's family said that morning that it would never return to Nell's house as long as Nell was there, as Nell broke Sam's foot, but that Numa would arrive shortly. Nell goes upstairs and hears two voices laughing, and Eva says that it was her and Numa, her doll. Eva tells Suse that if Nell ever made Numa leave like Mingo's family, Numa would take Eva with her to "where the woodbine twineth" so she wouldn't be alone. Eva also says that sometimes she is the doll and Numa puts her in the doll's box, as she gets bored. Nell comes back to Eva speaking with a voice Eva claims is that of Numa, so Nell takes Numa away from Eva. After Suse is told to put Eva to bed, the player piano begins playing on its own, frightening Nell. Jesse works on the piano and claims that it was just a loose spring. That night, Eva sneaks out of her room to get Numa, and Suse and Jesse hear the piano playing again. When Nell returns later, she finds that Numa and Eva are both missing. Nell runs outside, hearing Eva's voice, but she sees Eva dancing with a young black girl (Perry). Upon getting closer, she chases the young girl away quite villainously, but she then notices, to her horror, that Eva has become the doll. Nell then runs screaming for Numa to come back but is left in agony as she has lost her niece once and for all. Supporting Cast: Carl Benton Reid as Captain King Snyder, Juanita Moore as Suse, Joel Fluellen as Jessie, E.J. Andre as the Preacher, Eileen Baral as Eva Snyder, Lila Perry as Numa
346	14	"Final Performance"	John Brahm	Robert Bloch	Franchot Tone as The Great Rudolph (Rudolph Bitzner), Roger Perry as Cliff Allen, Sharon Farrell as Rosie	January 18, 1965
A former vaudevillian's fiancée plans to get away from him. A seventeen-year-old girl, Rosie (Farrell), desperately signals a car to stop for her. The driver, Cliff Allen (Perry), tells her he is moving to Los Angeles to write for a naval television show, which delights her greatly, as that is her destination. Soon, though, a local Iowa sheriff (Thordsen) pulls them over, and he proceeds to charge the driver with all sorts of offenses. When confronted, Rosie claims that Cliff forced her into his car. When Cliff's beaten-up car won't start again, the sheriff takes Rosie back into town and tells Cliff to wait for a tow truck and then see him into town, as the sheriff has Cliff's license. In town, Cliff rents a cabin from local innkeeper Rudolph Bitzner, who went by the stage name Rudolph the Great in the era of vaudeville. Rosie appears and shows a bewildered Cliff to his cabin, and then she explains her actions to Cliff, telling Cliff he should leave while he can. Rudolph takes Cliff on a tour of his memorabilia and mentions his former wife and partner Maggie. Rudolph tells Cliff that when Rosie turns eighteen next week, they will get married immediately afterward. Rudolph goes on a rant about how a man must keep strict control over a woman who has taken the vows of marriage and how his former wife failed, but he will make Rosie succeed. Rosie presses Rudolph to take her to Hollywood, as he has promised to do for years, but he presses her to continue waiting. That night, Rosie sneaks over to Cliff's cabin and begs him to take her to Hollywood with him, as she is scared of Rudolph and knows that he will never take her out of the town. Rosie proposes that Cliff consider marrying her in order to take her away, but she flees when she hears Rudolph whistling nearby. Rudolph and Rosie practice their vaudeville routine in front of Cliff and a local on a stage that Rudolph built himself, and then Rudolph warns Cliff to stay away from Rosie. Cliff goes to check on his car, only to find that town mechanic Wint Davis (Challee) has done no work on it, as Davis says that he must wait for parts. Rudolph asks Cliff to write him a new comedy routine, but Cliff claims he doesn't write comedy, and Rudolph rants that he still has what it takes. Rosie surprises Cliff and begs him once again to take her with him to Hollywood, reiterating that she is quite afraid of Rudolph. Cliff pays the thirty-five dollars in traffic fines to the sheriff but has to wait for the studio to send money to pay for car repairs. When he asks why Rosie isn't working today, Rudolph claims that Rosie has been working too hard and is sick in bed. Cliff goes to look for her and finds her in Maggie's old wedding dress, and he promises to take her with him when he leaves that night around eight o'clock, to her tremendous delight. When he goes to pick her up that night, Rudolph is waiting as he knows about their plan. Cliff demands to see Rosie, so Rudolph takes him to their stage. Cliff confronts Rosie about what she truly wants, but she appears to reject him. Only after Cliff leaves it is revealed that there is a knife sticking in her back and Rudolph is, in fact, performing with her dead body in a morbid ventriloquist act, with him imitating her voice. Supporting Cast: William Challee as Wint Davis, Kelly Thordsen as the Sheriff Note: The local townsman enjoying the performance run-through is uncredited and currently unknown.
347	15	"Thanatos Palace Hotel"	Laslo Benedek	Arthur A. Ross (teleplay); André Maurois (story)	Angie Dickinson as Ariane Shaw, Steven Hill as Robert Manners	February 1, 1965
A suicidal man, Robert Manners (Hill), checks into a hotel that caters to people just like him. Manners leans against the ledge of a high-rise office building before lunging to the ground, though he is saved by firefighters holding a protective tarp. Later that day, he is visited by Mr. J. Smith (Bartlett) of the Thanatos Palace Hotel, who witnessed his earlier incident. Smith knows that the bank is foreclosing on Robert's home and offers him the chance to die with dignity and his soul at ease, as Smith will kill him peacefully and painlessly after a day of leisure for only one thousand dollars total. Later, three cowboys (Wills, Brown) ride their horses as Robert is driven to the hotel by the hotel driver (Hendry). There he notices a very young woman (Ellis), beautiful painter Ariane Shaw, and meets general manager Borchter (Atwater), who informs Robert that his passing will occur when he is asleep. He has dinner with Ariane, who reveals that she has been there for months because she has not yet become at peace with dying, and no one is allowed to leave there alive. She reveals that the wine steward, Devereau (Comeaux), has been there for months as well, trading services for room and board. They discuss fearing the moment that death occurs and agree to help each other reach peace. After Robert leaves, Borchter presses Ariane to get Robert ready, and she promises that it will only be a few days at most, as she has never let him down. Robert requests to speak with Ariane in private, but the cowboys prevent them from going very far away from the hotel without a pass to walk in the nearby hills. Robert realizes that he is a prisoner and suddenly wants to leave, but Ariane tells him that the hotel sometimes uses drugs to sedate residents, and Robert asks her if she is the one sent to kill him. She admits that Borchter has used her to love patients until it is time for them to die, and she doesn't want to care about Robert because she doesn't want to be a "thing" anymore. Afterward, Borchter says that Ariane can only have one more day or he will put someone else on the case, as the room is being prepared for the next guest. Ariane requests to go horseback riding, as she says that was one of Robert's greatest loves, and Borchter issues a pass to go riding. While riding, Ariane admits that Borchter lets people buy more time for money or services, which is how Ariane has lived for so long. Rather than be upset, though, Robert states his desire to love her. The riders chase Robert and Ariane, and they discuss the method of execution: a sedative followed by lethal gas through the room's vents. Robert visits the hotel doctor (Reiner) and nurse (Sanderson), claiming that he hurt his ribs while riding, and the doctor issues a sedative for him to take that night. In his room, Robert tapes the vents to prevent the gas from coming through, and he feigns taking the sedative from the nurse. The next morning, Borchter visits Robert and finds the tape over the vents, but he is amused rather than angry. Ariane knows that means that she will be killed as well, so they seek out help from others who want to keep living. Robert plans to hold a barbeque in the hills with others, luring the riders one at a time to their deaths. Ariane recruits Devereaux, a big man (Fredericks), a lean man (Renella), a gray-haired woman (Bonney), the young woman, and others to increase their chances of success. However, Robert realizes that the others don't know the real reason that they are at the barbeque, so Robert informs them. However, the others are very angry at Robert for his deception and comments. When he attempts to leave suddenly with Ariane, a rider emerges and lassos a rope around his neck, throwing it over the nearby tree branch and killing Robert by hanging him in front of the whole group. Supporting Cast: Bartlett Robinson as Mr. J. Smith, Barry Atwater (credited as G.B. Atwater) as Borchter, Rex Comeaux as Devereau, Charles Fredericks as the Big Man, Pat Renella as the Lean Man, Len Hendry as Driver, Henry Wills as First Cowboy, Lew Brown as Second Cowboy, Adrianne Ellis as Young Woman, Robert Reiner as Doctor, Nancy Sanderson as Nurse, Gail Bonney as Gray-Haired Woman
348	16	"One of the Family"	Joseph Pevney	Oscar Millard	Jeremy Slate as Dexter Dailey, Lilia Skala as Frieda Schmidt	February 8, 1965
A family, the Daileys, discovers that the German nurse, Frieda Schmidt (Skala), that they hired to care for their baby is a wanted child killer. Frieda arrives at the Dailey home and is greeted by Joyce Dailey (Hays), who questions why her husband Dexter (Slate) did not meet Frieda at the bus depot. Joyce is excited to show Frieda that her room has its own television, but Frieda is uninterested as her favorite show, wrestling, has been cancelled. They see the baby as Dexter arrives, and he laughs that Frieda, whom he calls Mootie, is the same as when she babysat him as a child. Frieda soon begins making household decisions regarding the baby for herself, which irritates Joyce. After the Daileys leave for work, Frieda listens to a radio broadcast about a woman, Gretchen Royter, wanted for the suspicion for poisoning a San Francisco infant belonging to the Callendar family. When the Daileys go out for the evening and the baby begins crying incessantly, Frieda gives him some liquid out of a bottle she had hidden. The Daileys come home to the infant continuing to scream and Joyce calls Dr. Beaumont. Joyce's mother (Reid) Mrs. Landon comes by to ease Joyce's concerns and warns Joyce not to let Frieda get too bossy and controlling. Mrs. Landon is relieved that Joyce hired Frieda, as she admits to not want to babysit the baby for two months while the Daileys are in Europe. Frieda avoids listening to the radio and throws away the newspaper, along with refusing to provide a social security number for tax purposes. When Joyce presses her to provide past employers, she makes up various names and claims she never worked in San Francisco, which makes Joyce suspicious as she claims that Frieda sent them a Christmas card from San Francisco. Joyce asks Dexter about her lack of references, but Dexter says that she is one of the family. As Dr. Beaumont is out of town, Dr. Brock (Bouchey) drops in to check on the baby and says that he is well and has a good nurse. Joyce catches Frieda attempting to give the baby her special medicine, which she forbids. Joyce attempts to call Frieda's references, but they don't exist, so she calls the Callendars of San Francisco, but only their maid (Lloyd) is present to take a message. Joyce later receives a return phone call from Christine Callendar (Deering), the sister of the devastated couple. Christine warns Joyce that the nurse in question is quite dangerous and insane, so extreme caution is needed, and she agrees to send a picture of the woman immediately. Christine comes personally, as she is worried about Joyce and the baby, and she provides the same picture that Frieda has with the Callendar baby. Joyce locks Frieda in the closet, while Christine pretends to call the police. Christine then asks for a cup of coffee, so Joyce leaves the baby with her while Frieda bangs on the door to be let out. Christine details having a happy life living with her brother until her sister-in-law and baby came along, in addition to a dominating nurse. Christine outlines her desire for space need for control, as her brother George asked her to leave the home, and she resents anyone who pushes her around, including the soft hands of a baby. She then produces a pistol and seeks to kill Frieda herself, admitting that she didn't actually call the police. When they open the door holding Frieda, Christine admits to possessing the bottle that killed the baby and starts shrieking when the baby cries, firing a shot into the mirror. To calm the rambling Christine, Frieda says that she won't punish her and loves her, so she won't tell her daddy that she has been bad. They embrace in the manner in which a nanny comforts a crying child while Joyce collects the gun to ensure and end to the theatrics. Supporting Cast: Kathryn Hays as Joyce Dailey, Olive Deering as Christine Callendar, Willis Bouchey as Dr. Brock, Frances Reid as Mrs. Landon (Joyce's Mother), Doris Lloyd as Callendars' Maid
349	17	"An Unlocked Window"	Joseph M. Newman	James Bridges (teleplay); Ethel Lina White (story)	Dana Wynter as Nurse Stella, T. C. Jones as Nurse Betty Ames, Louise Latham as Maude Isles, John Kerr as Glendon Baker	February 15, 1965
Two nurses care for a patient in a town where previous nurses have been killed. Nurse Frieda Little (Merchant) leaves the home of Boris Crispis (Roberts), who offers to give her a ride home. After declining, Frieda is killed walking through a local park, so a newscaster (Willis) has reporter Al Ruben (Brown) interview Boris about the previous night and the string of strangling murders committed against nurses. Nurse Stella (Wynter) and Maude Isles (Latham) speak about their concerns with Maude's husband Sam (Andre), but Nurse Betty Ames (Jones) worries about a patient's low oxygen supply in the one remaining tank, so Sam goes to get another tank. Stella attempts to close all the basement windows as a storm is approaching, but the sudden appearance of a mouse scares her, and she forgets to shut one. Stella and Betty trade turns looking after patient Glendon Baker (Kerr), the owner of the house, when Dr. Jones calls and says that another body has been found nearby and the killer is still on the loose. After dinner, Baker asks Stella to marry him, promising to get well that very moment if she says yes. Later, Maude hears a man laughing and saying that she has a pretty neck, so she attempts to turn on all the house's lights, and that leads to an argument with the two nurses. However, suddenly the electricity goes out, and they are left in the dark. When they check the basement, they find that all fuses have been blown, so they must rely on candlelight. Maude gets drunk until she passes out, so Stella and Betty take her to a bed in Betty's room. Betty awakens to the sound of a man laughing, so she frantically screams, leading Stella and Betty to return and give her a sedative. Just then, Betty gets a phone call from a man who says he has been watching Stella for days, knows that the nurses are alone, and threatens to do harm to them. After several more calls from the man, Betty calls the police to report the threats. When they go back upstairs, they see the cat desperately trying to get in, and Stella suddenly realizes that there is one remaining open window in the basement, as the cat was previously in the basement. She tries to close it but sees the legs of a man approaching, and a man pounds on the door wanting entrance. From Baker's room, she hears Betty scream, so she goes to investigate and finds the front door wide open. Stella then hears a glass window break and Betty call out to her help under the stairs, so she grabs a fire poker and hears laughing. She reaches Betty, who claims that the man tried to strangle her, and they see the body of Sam posted dead behind the door. Betty's voice then changes to that of a man, and Stella rips off his wig as he admits he staged the phone call to the police. Stella realizes that there is no help coming for her as complete and utter terror takes over. Supporting Cast: E.J. Andre as Sam Isles, Cathie Merchant as Nurse Frieda Little, Stephen Roberts as Boris Crispis, Lew Brown as Al Ruben, John Willis as Newscaster, Len Hendry as Man
350	18	"The Trap"	John Brahm	Lee Kalcheim	Anne Francis as Peg Beale, Robert Strauss as Ted Beale, Donnelly Rhodes as John Cochran	February 22, 1965
A woman, Peg Beale (Francis), plots to murder her husband Ted (Strauss) and marry one of his employees. John Cochran (Rhodes) arrives to a new job at a wealthy home and witnesses Peg romantically embracing a man (Renella) before being escorted by a servant (Ayer) and butler, Ralph (Stuart), to meet his new boss, Ted. Ted is obsessed with games and works to get John to try out for the job of his personal secretary by hitting baseballs with a plastic bat. John says that he is a shorthand champion from Princeton University, so Ted calls for wife Peg to test his skills, which prove to be quite excellent. After John leaves, Peg recommends that Ted not hire John, but Ted is insistent, as John likes 'Princeton'. John proves quite adept at writing letters and saves him from wasting a significant financial investment on a stuffed raccoon. Peg continues to push Ted to fire John, but Ted says that John is the nest secretary he has ever had. The Beales attend a birthday party for Ted held by Glen (Mathews) and Jenifer Arnold (Manning), where many guests (Scott) have fun and dancers (Blodgett and Daro) celebrate, but John and Peg watch each other closely before Peg sneaks away with her boyfriend. Afterward, Ted details to John how he met Peg at a toy convention as John works to keep Ted from catching Peg with her boyfriend. The next day, John and Peg discuss her romantic dalliances, and John says that he won't say anything to Ted, but he confronts her with her hatred for Ted before they embrace when the elevator they occupy gets stuck. They begin a romantic relationship and Peg says that if Ted were to die, then they could get married. Peg agrees that they would have to kill Ted as he would never grant Peg a divorce, so John says that he will think of a way to get it done. The next day, Ted is excited to introduce to John to the game of tetherball with racquets, but Ted becomes deflated when John wins twice his salary in defeating him. Beale friend Jenifer reveals to Peg and John that Ted has scheduled Peg to travel for six months, and then he pushes John to get promoted and work in Rome, so Peg is afraid that Ted knows about them and is breaking them up. However, Ted suddenly announces that he has to leave for Chicago due to a business error, so Peg can stay but John is driven away. After dismissing Ralph, Peg sabotages the elevator, trapping Ted inside, before getting a taxi driver (Alper) to take her to the airport. She tries to catch John but fails and goes to the country with the Arnolds. While trying to call John, she is interrupted by Jenifer and her daughter Rosemary (Tyson), who is playing with a teddy bear hosting a recording of Ted's voice. This greatly infuriates Peg and she throws the bear into the pool in front of an astonished Jenifer before leaving. Upon returning home, Peg resets the elevator switches but is surprised by Ted while doing so. He presents her with a pearl necklace, and he reveals that he had already left in the limousine that day. When Peg calls for the elevator, they find John dead, as it was he that was trapped in the elevator for all that time. Supporting Cast: Walter Mathews as Glen Arnold, Gilchrist Stuart as Ralph the Butler, Patricia Manning as Jenifer Arnold, Emma Tyson as Rosemary Arnold, Sandra Daro as Sandy the Watusi Dancer, Murray Alper as Cabbie, Pat Renella as Boyfriend, Michael Blodgett as Watusi Dancer, Mary Scott as Party Guest, Harold Ayer as Servant
351	19	"Wally the Beard"	James H. Brown	Arthur A. Ross	Larry Blyden as Walter Mills, Kathie Browne as Noreen Kimberly	March 1, 1965
A man, Walter Mills (Blyden), gets more than he bargained for when he acquires a wig and beard. Walter asks his co-worker fiancée Lucy Jones (Perkins) to lunch, but she dumps him after six weeks engagement because he is too ordinary with an ordinary life ("a square peg with a square hole"). Walter walks the streets in despair until spotting a wig shop, where a friendly salesman (Willock) fits him for a piece that shocks Walter, as he has been bald since the age of twenty-one. He gets talked into adding a beard and tries the look out in a local club, where the bartender (Indrisano) respects him and Walter gives advice on boats to a man, Curly (Harris), and woman, Noreen Kimberly (Browne). Noreen is impressed with Walter's apparent knowledge on sailing, as Walter claims to be named Phillip Marshall and to have sailed all over the world, and they hit it off. When he gets home, Walter is confronted by landlady Mrs. Adams (Squire), who fails to recognize him as he seems to be classy compared to the lame Walter that she knows. Walter is elated while looking out his apartment window, until he spies Curly watching from across the street. The next day, Mrs. Adams barges in on Walter to find Phillip Marshall, as a note was left for him and she wants back rent. He says that he will pay nothing as he is moving. He visits the rooming house of Mrs. Jones (Harrower) in the disguise of Phillip. He claims that Walter is a business associate of his and then he calls Noreen for a date to the local marina. Walter requests help from boat salesman Keefer (Mitchell), who offers to supply a sailboat, named "Loafer", with a motor to help Walter cheat and impress Noreen for $3,000. After Walter hurts himself and Noreen works to heal his wound, Noreen reveals to Walter that she is still married but is soon to be single. After they share some romantic embraces, Walter leaves but is stopped by Curly, who wants Walter to hide $50,000 in stolen silver and jewelry for him; Walter says no until Curly threatens to pull off his fake beard. They stage a fake fishing trip to tie the boat to a mooring at dawn the next day. Meanwhile, Mrs. Adams has placed a wanted ad for Walter and Phillip for back rent, and Mrs. Jones calls her to discuss the matter and investigate Walter's room. When Walter comes home as Phillip, he is greeted by the landladies, Detective Lieutenant Johnson (Bergere), and police officers asking about his knowledge of Walter and why he, Phillip, has all of Walter's clothes. "Phillip" claims that he purchased all of Walter's clothes and is currently unemployed. Reluctantly, he removes the wigs, revealing himself to be Walter. Johnson presses him for every bit of information about himself, from places of employment to his associates. As Walter, he goes to Noreen and says that he is half the man Phillip is before donning the wig and beard to show her the truth. Surprisingly, she embraces and kisses him, saying that she is now legally separated. He admits his involvement with Curly, who Noreen describes as a cunning and vicious animal. Noreen tells him to cut the loot from the mooring so Curly will have no evidence and lose everything. Walter goes to the marina while it is still dark and is caught by Keefer, who fails to appreciate his ruse with the beard. When he retrieves the stolen loot, the police suddenly arrive, but the loot bag contains the body of Joseph Kimberly, Noreen's estranged husband. Noreen and Curly set up Walter to take the fall for Joseph's murder, and he will have a hard time explaining everything now. Supporting Cast: George Mitchell as Keefer, Katherine Squire as Mrs. Adams, Elizabeth Harrower as Mrs. Jones, Lee Bergere as Detective Lieutenant Johnson, Leslie Perkins as Lucy Jones, Berkeley Harris as Curly, Dave Willock as Wig Salesman, Johnny Indrisano as Bartender
352	20	"Death Scene"	Harvey Hart	James Bridges	Vera Miles as Nicky Revere/Monica Parrish, John Carradine as Gavin Revere, James Farentino as Leo Manfred	March 8, 1965
A mechanic, Leo Manfred (Farentino), aspiring to be an actor writes a screenplay for the daughter, Nicky Revere (Miles), of a has-been director, Gavin Revere (Carradine). Nicky takes a drive in her antique limousine to a repair shop, where mechanics Leo and Dancer Smith (Taylor) discuss her class and prestige while lead mechanic Bill Wagner (Yorr) checks on the transmission. While the other mechanics work, Leo drives Nicky home and compliments Gavin for his past directorial works and Nicky's retired mother, Susan (Aldridge), for her star status. He flirts with her incessantly until she ignores his desires to take a swim together and leaves him, where Gavin clamors for her to come inside while she considers his advances. Roommates Leo and Dancer discuss Susan's past and Gavin's polo accident, which left him unable to walk, before they drunkenly ride by the Mon Vere mansion on Dancer's motorcycle so that Leo can flirt with Nicky over the front-gate intercom. The next day, Leo visits Nicky to determine if she is completely satisfied with the automobile repairs and apologize for his drunken stupor the night before. When Nicky is set to drive the vehicle with Leo, Gavin orders Nicky inside and demands to have the car set to his specifications. Leo claims to be a former actor who worked in one commercial until quitting for steady work, but Gavin tells him that he was never an actor if he indeed quit. Leo washes his hands after servicing the automobile before sneaking into Gavin's private film theatre, where he asks about a film Gavin directed that he hasn't seen entitled "Death Scene". Gavin warns Leo away from Nicky before Leo goes to tell Nicky that she is being squeezed to death while being kept in the mansion away from everything, and Leo asks Nicky to dinner before kissing her. Before he leaves, Leo sabotages Nicky's car so that she will need his help once again. Later, he is called to work on the car while Gavin watches and criticizes modern times and rising property values. Afterward, Leo spots Nicky staring at him and chases after her, pressing her to tell Gavin about their desired relationship. Nicky calls Leo after she spoke to Gavin about marriage. Gavin reveals that there is a limit to his wealth, as he can no longer acquire life insurance, so Leo would have to be able to provide constant funds and get his own life insurance policy to be able to satisfy Nicky's needs. Leo invites Dancer to the prestigious mansion, with stones from Texas and windows from Morocco. Gavin and Nicky request to see Dancer dance, per his name, but he almost dances over a large retaining wall caused by a flood and collapse of support dirt. Gavin then invites them to view one of his movies in his theatre. The film, "Death Scene", concerns a Chicago heroine, Susu, who rejects gangster Sam Gread (Borgani) for the hero (Williams), but Leo and Dancer joke and laugh throughout the film to Gavin's disgust, so Gavin angrily orders them out. Leo calls later only to have Nicky tell him that Gavin has forbidden their relationship due to Leo insulting Gavin's favorite film. Leo decides to push Gavin off the ledge and kill him so he can have Nicky to himself. At the mansion, Gavin makes Nicky choose between the two of them, and she then surprisingly pushes Leo over the ledge and into the mostly emptied pool below, after which both Nicky and Gavin smile knowingly over his body. Nicky celebrates the $50,000 life insurance check while speaking on the phone to Susu (Aldridge), who happens to be the daughter of Gavin and "Nicky." "Nicky" then takes off her makeup to reveal her advanced age, as she is in fact Gavin's actress wife Susan, who starred in Gavin's films of old, and is the mother of Susu. Filmed at former estate of Marion Davies, which was also used as filming location for The Godfather (film series) (1972) and The Bodyguard (1992). Supporting Cast: Buck Taylor as Dancer Smith, Leonard Yorr as Bill Wagner, Virginia Aldridge as Susan Revere, Nick Borgani as Sam Gread, Horace G. Brown as Harry, Vince Williams as Our Hero
353	21	"The Photographer and the Undertaker"	Alex March	James Holding (story); Alfred Hayes teleplay	Jack Cassidy as Arthur Mannix, Harry Townes as Hiram Price	March 15, 1965
A photographer and an undertaker are assassins who have each been assigned to kill the other. A baseball announcer (Hearn) calls a game as a man (Hoyt) listens, before he is suddenly shot by assassin Arthur Mannix (Cassidy), who takes a picture of the body before having a drink and relaxing to the game. The next day, attorney Johnathan H. Rudolph asks his secretary Miss Whiting (Swift) about mail before opening a package containing a tape, detailing an economy drive, which he plays on his recorder. He then calls Ernest Sylvester (Bourneuf) as Arthur returns home to speak with local deli owner Mr. Leibowitz (Bernardi), only for Johnathan to be waiting of him with a new job. Arthur details how he has been following Johnathan's wife, angering him, before they calm down to discuss the proof that Arthur completed his last job on behalf of the home office, that being the picture of the dead man. Johnathan pays him the remainder of the fee before giving him his next target, Hiram Price (Townes), who lives nearby, and Arthur presses Johnathan about the location of the home office that establishes the various targets. Arthur spies on Hiram driving a hearse to meet with funeral arranger Willis (Jury) before Arthur then goes to the beach with girlfriend Sylvia Sylvester (Lane) and they discuss whether Sylvia's "daddy" will allow them to get married. Later, Arthur notices Hiram spying on his photography business front and believes the situation is off. Arthur goes to have dinner with Sylvia and Ernest, and Ernest questions Arthur as to whether he is an "odd" photographer, one who takes pictures for lewd magazines. Ernest applauds the concepts of brains, competition, thrift, and personal initiative as to the country's greatness. Ernest tells Arthur to raise at least $50,000 cash before they will discuss a potential wedding, and Arthur states that he has about twenty thousand of the total. Later, Hiram calls Arthur and requests a night appointment for his funeral business, and Arthur agrees to both of their delights. When Hiram arrives for the appointment, Arthur feigns working in the darkroom while Hiram prepares himself for the attack by donning his thick gloves and gun When Hiram rushes in with his knife, Arthur disarms him with karate. Hiram laments his first failure in ten years of work, as Arthur attributes it to overconfidence rather than carelessness. Arthur reveals that he too is an executioner with an order to kill Hiram for $10,000, which Hiram reveals is his price. Arthur believes that management is streamlining the workforce by one by pitting them against each other. They discuss how Hiram should die, quickly or crudely, as Arthur wants to know Hiram's management contact and his nullification method. Hiram reveals the contact to be Ernest meeting him in the park with the obituary page. Hiram suddenly pulls a knife from behind his head and throws it at Arthur, but he misses allowing Arthur to strike back fatally. Arthur takes his customary picture before setting his studio on fire to cover up any potential evidence and fake his own death. He goes to his apartment and waits to read about the story in the newspaper before donning the disguise of a beatnik to meet Ernest in the park in the place of Hiram. He gives Ernest a note claiming to be Hiram's simpleminded nephew Hugo in order to receive the cash. Later, Johnathan receives a call from "the photographer" in San Francisco warning him of a meeting the following night in his office. Sylvia also gets a call from Arthur, claiming to be in San Francisco, to her shock. At the meeting with Johnathan, Arthur reveals that he spoke with the police to clear himself of any involvement, as he called from San Francisco. He also received a nice insurance settlement in addition to the remaining $9,000 in payment for Hiram. Johnathan, who is happy to report his promotion within the company, then gives Arthur another big job, the execution of Ernest. Arthur dresses up as the hipster Hugo again and easily lures Ernest to his death in the park. Arthur can now happily marry Ernest's daughter Sylvia, who laments her father's inability to attend but carries on anyway. Supporting Cast: Alfred Ryder as Johnathan H. "Rudy" Rudolph the Attorney, Jocelyn Lane as Sylvia Sylvester, Philip Bourneuf as Ernest Sylvester, Richard Jury as Willis, Joan Swift as Miss Whiting, Jack Bernardi as Mr. Leibowitz the Deli Man, Clegg Hoyt as Man, Chick Hearn as Baseball Announcer (voice)
354	22	"Thou Still Unravished Bride"	David Friedkin	Avram Davidson (story); Morton S. Fine, David Friedkin	Ron Randell as Thomas 'Tommy' Bonn, David Carradine as Edward Clarke, Sally Kellerman as Sally Benner	March 22, 1965
London. A police officer suspects that his missing fiancée has been killed. A woman (Lloyd) chases her son Peter to the scene of a grisly murder, where police officers Tommy Bonn (Randell) and Stephen Leslie (Pate) debate the string of strangled thirty-something-year-old women with hoses and Tommy's recent engagement to a thirty-one-year-old American woman, Sally Benner (Kellerman). A nearby sergeant (Pelling) keeps the crowd at bay, as onlookers such Edward Clarke (Carradine) desire a closer look. Steve laments the loss of a sports partner and fellow ladies' man, but Tommy consoles him by giving him permission to conquer all for himself now. On their wedding day, Tommy and Sally tour various romantic spots around London, as Sally loves the romantic poets of the Old World, especially Keats. Mr. (Smith) and Mrs. Benner (Atwater), of Vincennes, Indiana, discuss the situation when Sally returns, but Sally refuses to try on the wedding dress as she felt terror when Tommy desired to touch her earlier in the park. She decides to go for a walk as Sally's brother, Elliot Setlin (Bessell), arrives with his mother Essie (Gregg) and her husband (Caine). Elliot offers to go with Sally for her walk, as there have been so many stranglings, but Sally declines. She visits Guerny and Son Chemists, and Guerny Jr. (Lupino) follows her after she leaves. Meanwhile, the Benners and the Setlins celebrate the occasion with champagne when they get a visit from Sally's maid-of-honor, Myrna (Lesley). Sally goes to a bookshop and listens to poetry read by Mr. Sutherland (Wright) before leaving and meeting a woman (Harford) of the night, who warns her to be careful. Mrs. Benner grows increasingly worried about Sally's absence, while Essie grows progressively more drunk as Tommy and Steve arrive. Sally stops by a local pub to read and is leered at by Edward while the bartender (Dillon) serves a raucous crowd. Elliot criticizes Tommy and Steve for being so classy and smooth despite the circumstances, so they leave and go to interview the chemist, Guerny Sr. (Napier), and his son, who has returned. Then father outlines what Sally purchased, while the son details where Sally went afterward. Next, the bookseller relates his excitement at being asked to read poetry for the first time in many years, especially their shared love of the poem "Thou Still Unravished Bride". The officers then stop by the pub visited by Sally, and Edward strikes up a conversation with them about his rapport with Sally. Edward takes them on a tour of where he and Sally strolled after leaving the pub, ending at the Thames where he says that the police should drag the river. He admits to having been arrested for activities with younger girls and describes himself as a hunter of people and "what makes them cripples inside", so he now focuses on older women who desire his youth and his depth at understanding the great age of poetry. Edward claims that the incident could have been an accident and shows them a spot on the river, so police search it only to find another woman's body. When they get back to the hotel, Sally suddenly appears, claiming that she went on a night tour of London. She tells Tommy that she needed time to think and realizes that she indeed loves Tommy, and Tommy tells her the circumstances of the night have confirmed his love for her and desire to get married. Supporting Cast: Michael Pate as Stephen 'Steve' Leslie, Ted Bessell as Elliot Setlin, Alan Napier as Guerny Sr., Richard Lupino as Guerny Jr., Virginia Gregg as Mrs. Essie Setlin, Edith Atwater as Mrs. Benner, Kent Smith as Mr. Benner, Howard Caine as Mr. Setlin, Ben Wright as Mr. Sutherland, Jana Lesley as Myrna, Doris Lloyd as Mother, Betty Harford as Woman, George Pelling as Sergeant, Brendan Dillon as Bartender
355	23	"Completely Foolproof"	Alf Kjellin	Anthony Terpiloff	J. D. Cannon as Joe Brisson, Patricia Barry as Lisa Brisson	March 29, 1965
California. A woman, Lisa Brisson (Barry), plots to murder her rich, cheating husband Joe (Cannon). Joe waits for politician Baines (Lieb) to arrive at a car park so that they can switch briefcases and quietly discuss an upcoming cash-for-vote issue. Joe realizes that they are being followed, so he confronts the tail upon leaving, and the private detective, George Foyle (Healey), reveals that it is Lisa that paid him to follow Joe. When he gets home, Lisa is hosting Walter Dunham (Matthews) and Betty Lawrence (de Winter), whom Joe cannot stand. Walter advises Joe not to handle bribery personally but rather use an intermediary. Lisa reveals that she knows about Joe's love interest, Anna (Meadows), and they begin a loud fight, making Walter and Betty leave. Lisa states that she wants a divorce and a settlement worth three quarters of their land development company, as she could leave Joe with an empty lot and he would still make money. Joe accuses Lisa of wanting to marry wealthy Bobby Davenport (Horne), who comes from an old prestigious family. Lisa then goes to visit Bobby and admits that she told Joe everything, and they discuss Joe squeezing Bobby on a loan regarding land. Meanwhile, Joe takes his telephone apart, finding a bug while Anna looks for intimate letters that she hid but cannot find. Joe then orders Anna to deny having ever known him, as he is afraid that she will be called to testify against him in court. When Lisa comes home, Joe promises to avoid Anna and give Lisa the settlement that she desires to avoid going to court. Lisa says that she wants the Davenport promissory note, and Joe bargains for an additional ten percent of their business in return, though Lisa can tell by Joe's eyes that he wants her dead. Joe attempts to hire George Foley for $25,000 to kill Lisa, but Foley is still angry about their fight in the parking lot and orders Joe out at gunpoint before calling Lisa about the incident. Joe has lunch with Bobby at a private club and Bobby asks for an extension on his loan before they debate whether Lisa would be better to ask for such lenience. Later, Bobby asks Lisa to marry him, but she sees through him and brings up whether the promissory note is behind it, indicating that she could not act personally if she is in charge of the company and Bobby is a bad gambler. Lisa throws cold water on Joe's promise to wait for months before deciding on whether to call in the loan and says that her assets, as well as Joe's, will be frozen for six weeks due to the divorce. After she leaves, Bobby retrieves a revolver and rushes over to Joe's office, with the secretary (MacLachlan) unable to prevent him from bursting in. Joe says that he will be claiming the Davenport land, as there will be no extension, and Bobby pulls the revolver on him demanding the note and deed to the land. Joe realizes that Lisa turned her back on Bobby and shows Bobby letters indicating that Lisa has been playing him all along, so Joe promises in writing to give him the note and deed if Bobby will perform certain obligations, meaning killing Lisa when Joe and she are talking on the phone. On the day in question, Joe calls Lisa from the cruise he is taking while Bobby sneaks in and shoots Lisa. However, Joe receives a visitor directly after hanging up as George enters to shoot and kill Joe on behalf of Lisa. Supporting Cast: Myron Healey as George Foyle, Lester Matthews as Walter Dunham, Jo de Winter as Betty Lawrence, Geoffrey Horne as Bobby Davenport, Joyce Meadows as Anna, Robert Lieb as Baines, Janet MacLachlan as Secretary
356	24	"Power of Attorney"	Harvey Hart	James Bridges (teleplay)	Richard Johnson as Jarvis Smith, Geraldine Fitzgerald as Agatha Tomlin, Fay Bainter as Mary Caulfield	April 5, 1965
A con man, Jarvis Smith (Johnson), swindles wealthy women. Richard scams his latest victim, Sarah Norton (Scott), by selling her worthless tocks while engaging in a false relationship with her, as she tells the policeman (Sims). Richard then travels by airplane when he meets Agatha Tomlin (Fitzgerald) and Mary Caulfield (Bainter), his next intended victims, under the pseudonym James Jarvis. Mary falls for him immediately, while Agatha is more suspicious. At the airport, Mary's niece Eileen Carroll (Lloyd) picks the ladies up to take them home to their shared residence in an expensive hotel. The hotel clerk (Hole) says that there is no reservation for him, but he charms his way into a room, thanks to Mary. They have tea with Eileen's beau Roger Reeves (Sturges) until Jarvis' room is ready. For the next five days, Jarvis works to charm the ladies into buying his phony olive stocks, but septuagenarian Thomas Barton (Jochim) controls their money. That night, Jarvis breaks into Barton's home while he sleeps, and it is revealed that Barton had a stroke from suffocation. Later, Mary and Agatha discuss Mary's need for a new lawyer and Agatha's suspicion of Jarvis, which Mary believes is brought on by jealousy and desire. Jarvis takes Agatha out on a date, and Mary gives Jarvis power of attorney. After Mary goes to bed, Agatha and Jarvis slap each other and then embrace romantically. One day later, Jarvis returns with the news (his usual ploy) that Mary's trust has hit bankruptcy and she is penniless. Agatha offers to help with her only $1,000 in savings, and Jarvis accepts another chance to steal some money after checking out of the hotel. Mary calls Eileen regarding the bad news and tells her goodbye before playing her favorite music, writing a note asking for forgiveness, and then shooting herself. When Agatha arrives back at the hotel with groceries, the clerk (Ruban) informs her that Jarvis has checked out. Agatha then finds Mary's body and Eileen arrives just afterward, so Agatha tells her that Mary is just sleeping. Eileen tells Agatha about the fake company Jarvis supposedly invested in and realizes that both Mary and Agatha got swindled. Agatha cleans the revolver of fingerprints and burns the suicide note before placing the gun in a drawer. Jarvis calls the ladies, and Agatha claims that Mary just received a major inheritance from her brother and needs advice. Agatha forces Jarvis to take the gun and sends him into the room where Mary's body lies, locking him inside. She then calls the police while Jarvis desperately tries to get out, including shooting his way through the lock. The police arrive just in time and shoot Jarvis dead, with Agatha claiming that Jarvis shot Mary from an argument about stocks. Supporting Cast: Josie Lloyd as Eileen Carroll, Mary Scott (credited as Mary Scott Hardwicke) as Sarah Norton, Solomon Sturges (credited as Mark Sturges) as Roger Reeves, Anthony Jochim as Thomas Barton, Jonathan Hole as Hotel Clerk, George Sims as Policeman, Al Ruban as Clerk
357	25	"The World's Oldest Motive"	Harry Morgan	Lewis Davidson	Henry Jones as Alex Morrow, Linda Lawson as Fiona McNiece, Robert Loggia as Richard Schausak, Kathleen Freeman as Angela Morrow	April 12, 1965
A married attorney, Alex Morrow (Jones), gets the chance to marry his girlfriend, Fiona McNiece (Lawson), when an outsider, Richard Schausak (Loggia), offers to kill his wife Angela (Freeman). Alex enjoys his stamp collection when Angela calls, leaving him to be gruff with his secretary Miss Rice (Thompson). He then goes to a dance club to have fun with Fiona before becoming obsessed with Richard staring at him. He gets surprised by an old drinking buddy, Steve Jamieson (Mell), who reveals to Fiona that Alex is married, which makes Fiona flee the club terribly upset. Alex follows before the waiter (Lamont) stops him with the bill and then catches Fiona when she reaches the hatcheck girl (Hernandez), comforting Fiona that everything will be all right. The next morning, Angela makes eggnog and eats peanut butter on Graham crackers, with Alex complaining that has had to deal with the smell of peanut butter for the entirety of his marriage. Alex tells Angela that he was out with a girl and doesn't like Angela having a private detective tail him, but she only laughs and says that she hasn't hired anyone, though a strange man stopped by the house pretending to be an insurance investigator. As works ends that day, Fiona calls Alex and cancels dinner, and Alex finds himself surprised in the restroom by Richard, the man who has been investigating him (through wiretapping his phone and following him) and wants to offer him the service of killing Angela in a fire at their home. Richard provides examples of deaths marked accidental for which his company was responsible. Alex then goes to visit Fiona, but the cleaning woman (French) tells him that Fiona has left for a date and won't be home for a week until Alex slips her some cash, with the reveal that she is poolside. When Alex tries to pull her out of the pool, she instead pulls him in, soaking his suit. Alex finally tells Fiona that he loves her and can't go back to his married life anymore. When Alex goes home, Angela asks about Fiona, admitting that there is nothing else for either of them and that she (Angela) cheated on him years ago with multiple men, as she has never been anything but a servant to Alex. Alex then calls Richard, and they go golfing while discussing Angela's habits, the machinery of the house, and the floor plans, with the deed being completed for $15,000 with half up front and half after the deed is done. Alex goes back to Fiona, promising her that he is almost free because she refuses to see a married man. He admits to meeting someone who will take care of Angela without the concerns of a divorce, what is called statistical assistance by Richard, but Fiona sees it as murder and tells him to stop the plan immediately. Alex calls the company and tells them to call it off, so Richard picks him up and demands the first part of the payment. However, he soon receives a phone call while they are driving saying that it is too late, but Alex may be able to stop it himself by stopping her from taking her vitamin pills. After being dropped off, Alex hails a taxi driver (Stears) to take him home. He gets there after she has already taken her pills and finds Angela asleep on the bed, so he rushes to his study to call Richard. Richard answers and hands the phone to Fiona, who says that Richard is taking her on a long trip. After hanging up, Richard and Fiona discuss their business of finding marks to trick into paying them cash, while Alex glumly accepts Angela's offer of eggnog and implied marital stability. Supporting Cast: Joseph Mell as Steve Jamieson, Dee J. Thompson as Miss Rice, Susan French as Cleaning Woman, Syl Lamont as Waiter, Kai Hernandez as Hatcheck Girl, Shawn Michaels as the Drinker, Tom J. Stears as Taxi Driver
358	26	"The Monkey's Paw—A Retelling"	Robert Stevens	Morton S. Fine, David Friedkin, Anthony Terpiloff (teleplay); W. W. Jacobs (story)	Leif Erickson as Paul White, Jane Wyatt as Anne White, Lee Majors as Howard White	April 19, 1965
A man, Paul White (Erickson), acquires a monkey's paw that grants three wishes – with deadly consequences. At Selina's (Wilcox) home, a gypsy woman (Talma) and gypsy boy (Caruso) perform while Howard White (Majors), Selina, Gale (MacLachlan), Robin Boyd (Margolin), Curtis Welks (Howard), Mary Smith (Phillips), Joan Fanu (Marley), Hume Ray (Chase), Frank Corseli (Renella), and Natasha Gurlieff (Toumanoff) watch, with Gale joking frequently and insulting the woman's work. Meanwhile, Paul and wife Anne (Wyatt) hold a telephone conversation with Paul's corrupt partner Fleming, who demands $150,000 within five days in order to separate amicably. The gypsy woman gives a monkey's paw to Gale and promises three wishes, but the last one will be for death. The paw is thrown into the fire, but Paul rescues it from burning. Paul strongly believes in the magic therein, but Anne believes him to be a fool. When Paul gets Anne some water later, he wishes for the cash he needs to settle with his partner. The next day, Howard races as he tries to match what his advisor suggested was necessary to win, even though Anne desperately tries to stop Howard from racing altogether, as she disapproves. Howard promises Selina that he will go faster and always be first, as she demands, and Paul pushes for the same. All Anne can do is get Howard to wear her favorite scarf and take off the monkey's paw that he wore the day before. After Howard leaves, Anne collapses out of fear, with Paul consoling her that all will be well. Anne tries to nap but is awakened by Howard's friends standing silently outside the home in fog and then leaving, though Paul says that he didn't see them. Suddenly, a man (Stuart) arrives at the gate and says that Howard crashed and died near the finish line, with an insurance policy paying out $150,000 to the Whites. They invite the gypsy woman and boy to return, along with Howard's insensitive friends, who joke about Howard's death but apologize for not speaking to Anne outside her home. The woman conducts a seance to reach Howard, and although they all hear a racing car in the distance, they receive no voice communication from Howard. Later, Anne gets the idea to use the monkey's paw and wish for Howard to live again, though Paul refuses as his first wish killed Howard. Paul finally relents, only to instantly hear pronounced knocking at the door. However, it is only Selina and Robin, as Selina wants the Whites to leave her house immediately so that she can rent it out. Anne wants everything that Selina took from Howard, including love, but Selina only has her admiration for Howard's beauty to note. While packing, they hear a car arrive, with Paul looking out the window in horror. At the sound of knocking, Anne runs to answer the door despite Paul's protestations. Paul hurriedly reaches for the paw to wish Howard dead again in order to spare Anne from the horror of Howard lacking a face, and upon opening the door, Anne is comforted only by her favorite scarf returning to her. Supporting Cast: Collin Wilcox as Selina, Stuart Margolin as Robin Boyd, Pat Renella as Frank Corseli, Vincent Chase as Hume Ray, Janet MacLachlan as Gale, Carmen Phillips as Mary Smith, Marusia Toumanoff as Natasha Gurlieff, Michelle Marley as Joan Fanu, Peter Howard as Curtis Welks, Gilchrist Stuart as British Man, Zolya Talma as Gypsy Woman, Richard Caruso as Gypsy Boy Note: Howard's racing advisor is uncredited and currently unknown.
359	27	"The Second Wife"	Joseph M. Newman	Robert Bloch (teleplay); Richard Deming (story)	June Lockhart as Martha Peters, John Anderson as Luke Hunter	April 26, 1965
A newlywed woman, Martha Peters (Lockhart) thinks that her new husband, Luke Hunter (Anderson), killed his previous wife Virginia. Martha arrives via bus and gets help from Luke Hunter (Anderson). Luke tells bystander Sam Ogle (Fresco) that he and Martha are getting married that night, even though this is the first time that they have ever meet, as they chose each other through a correspondence club. They compare each other's bank books while Luke drives them to the minister's house, where Reverend Gilfoyle (Boles) presides over the vows and his wife Peggy (Flynn) works to boost the nervous couple's spirits. The newlyweds go home and Luke shows Martha around the house, with her particularly unsettled about how cold the basement is. Luke prods around the basement dirt floor with a shovel before going upstairs and burning a picture of him and another woman, likely his previous wife. Over the next month, Martha works to seamlessly integrate herself with the townsfolk, and after joining a sewing circle, she learns from Helen Fiske (Backes) and Sylvia Boggs (McVeagh) that Luke had married another woman from a correspondence course named Virginia who died of food poisoning after a trip to Texas. Upon returning home, she hears Luke digging in the basement, though he says that he was just checking. She confronts him with Virginia, and he admits that they just never got along. That night, he suggests that they take a vacation trip to his hometown in Texas, which causes great fear in Martha. Martha sees Luke bring home a big box and store it in the garage, but he denies it, so she goes to investigate and finds a homemade coffin. Martha attempts to keep from taking the trip, but Luke finalizes plans on his own and tells her to say goodbye to her friends. After the circle meets, Martha asks Sylvia to keep her company before she and Luke leave, and Sylvia prods her about if something is wrong. While Luke is sleeping that night, Martha takes Luke's keys and goes into the basement and finds a hole has been dug big enough to fit the coffin. The next day, Luke arrives home early and gets Martha to leave for shopping in town, telling her not to worry about washing clothes in the basement until after the trip. Martha visits a pawnbroker (Chase) instead and buys a revolver. Later at home, Luke decides that they should leave that night, so Martha packs before Luke escorts her into the basement for a surprise. When he unlocks the door, Martha shoots him and walks down the stairs, only to discover a new heating furnace and tank where the hole was, in addition to the coffin-like box serving as a cabinet and a loving Christmas card from Luke. Supporting Cast: Jim Boles as Reverend Gilfoyle, Gertrude Flynn as Peggy Gilfoyle, Eve McVeagh as Sylvia Boggs, Alice Backes as Helen Fiske, David Fresco as Sam Ogle, Vincent Chase as Pawnbroker
360	28	"Night Fever"	Herbert Coleman	Gilbert Ralston (teleplay); Clark Howard (short story)	Colleen Dewhurst as Nurse Ellen Hatch, Tom Simcox as Jerry Walsh	May 3, 1965
An injured criminal uses a nurse's compassion to escape from the hospital. Sergeant Jake Martinez (De Santis) and Sergeant Gabe Greely (Stewart) wait for nurse Ellen Hatch (Dewhurst) and Dr. Michaels (Bull) to bring in patient Jerry Walsh (Simcox) so they can question him about his partner and a recent holdup in which a young police officer was killed. The police want to move Walsh, but the medical staff says no, so Walsh is handcuffed while Sergeant Martinez orders leg irons and bars on the windows. Nurse Ellen shows sympathy for the injured criminal, speaking to him tenderly and holding his hand. Soon, police officer Joe Chandler (Marshall) arrives to keep an eye on Walsh, while Sergeant Greely spends his time flirting with beautiful nurse Mary Winters (Lipton). Martinez and Ellen share lunch and discuss whether they enjoy their respective jobs, with Martinez comparing his to "picking up the trash". Jerry begins to sweet-talk Ellen, claiming he is attracted to her natural beauty, which befuddles the spinster nurse. He admits to being a participant in the robbery but claims that it is the first thing that he has ever done wrong, and he is adamant that he did not shoot the policeman. Ellen fixes up her hair, with Martinez telling Greely that she has developed a wife complex. Walsh tells Ellen that he has fallen in love with her, which she dismisses as a bad joke. Martinez and Greely then ask Walsh about the location of George Clark (Barnes), who the police have figured out is Walsh's partner. Ellen advises Walsh to not take his medicine so that his fever will stay high and he can get some better treatment, and he asks her to help him get away so that they can be together. He advises her to drug the guard and get supplies for "their" escape to the islands of Greece. Dr. Michaels is satisfied with Walsh's improvement, so he wants him to begin walking and recommends that the police can take him the following day. Walsh and Ellen agree to escape that night and embrace for the first time. After Officer Chandler unlocks Walsh's leg irons and sits for coffee, Ellen helps Walsh walk until Chandler passes out. They make their move with Walsh in a wheelchair and a bandage to cover his face, while she wears civilian clothes. They drive away in the pouring rain until reaching Walsh's hideout, where his partner George Clark resides with Walsh's girlfriend Pinky (Mitchell), who is extremely thrilled to see him. Walsh tells Ellen to go back to the hospital and take some of the drugged coffee, but Clark wants to kill her. Ellen convinces them that she would be an accessory after the fact, and Walsh reveals that he could never have fallen for her, though he orders Clark to let Ellen go. When she trudges downstairs, Martinez and the police are waiting to take them all into custody. Ellen admits to Martinez that she is a plain and dull girl with a plain face, and she reveals that there have been six others who attempted to manipulate her in such a way, so it was her pleasure in helping him pick up the trash. Supporting Cast: Joe De Santis as Sergeant Jake Martinez, Don Stewart as Sergeant Gabe Greely, Richard Bull as Dr. Michaels, Don Marshall as Officer Joe Chandler, Peggy Lipton as Nurse Mary Winters, Rayford Barnes as George Clark, Laurie Mitchell as Pinky, Carol Brewster as Mabel Cramm
361	29	"Off Season"	William Friedkin	Robert Bloch (teleplay); Edward D. Hoch (short story)	John Gavin as Johnny Kendall, Richard Jaeckel as Milt Woodman	May 10, 1965
A trigger-happy Kansas City cop, Johnny Kendall (Gavin), gets fired from the police department and gets a job in the office of small-town Sheriff Dade (Drake). An old drunk (Hines) breaks into a liquor store to vanquish his thirst just as two police officers arrive on the scene, Kendall and Sergeant Racin (Joyce), and Kendall shoots the frightened, unarmed man with three shots in the chest. Kendall then goes home to relax with fiancée Sandy Evans (Arthur) before he has to meet with police psychiatrist Dr. Hornbeck (Draper). Hornbeck questions why Kendall, a known marksman, didn't fire a warning shot or even try to wound the man, and Kendall rants that the man was a bum and wino, so Hornbeck recommends an honorable discharge. Kendall tells Sandy that he quit the force and their wedding must be delayed until he finds a new job. The couple travels far to rent rooms from motel owner Art Summers (O'Connell) before Kendall goes to the courthouse about a job, where he runs into Sheriff Dade speaking with his wife Irma (Heath). Dade isn't interested until Kendall reveals that he has years of experience, though he says that local law officers don't need to carry a gun. Sandy isn't thrilled about him being a cop again, even if he makes $75 per week and after she finds work as a waitress for $50 per week. Dade takes Kendall on a drive-along to learn the routine, and Kendall admits his past to the sheriff. City-boy Kendall has a hard time getting adjusted to the sound of frogs and owls. Kendall stops by to speak with the local bartender (McLeod) before getting slightly hassled by the previous deputy, Milt Woodman (Jaeckel), who was fired by Dade for "other activities", including constantly pursuing other women on the job. Kendall visits Sandy at her job, where she teases cook Al (Drum) about getting a real home-cooked meal. Kendall soon gets upset, though, when he sees Sandy and Woodman laughing together at her workplace. Woodman proceeds to consistently goad Kendall about Sandy, implying that they are becoming much closer. Kendall gives Sandy a list of locations where he can regularly be reached while on duty, but he later finds the list crinkled in one of the cabins that he patrols. He then searches her motel room, only to find a revolver under her chair cushion. He goes looking for Woodman at the bar, but the bartender says that he hasn't been in for a while, so Kendall searches the woods for the local hook-up cabin where he found the list, where he finds Woodman being romantically intimate with a woman in the dark. Upon Kendall uttering Woodman's name, the startled Woodman turns and fires a gun at Kendall, who returns fire and kills him. Kendall then keeps firing, shooting and killing the woman, who is revealed to be Irma, the sheriff's wife. Supporting Cast: Indus Arthur as Sandy Evans, Fred Draper as Dr. Hornbeck, William O'Connell as Art Summers, Tom Drake as Sheriff Dade, Dodie Heath as Irma Dade, Jimmy Joyce as Sergeant Racin, Jim Drum as Al, Harry Hines as Drunken Thief, Duncan McLeod as Bartender
