= Raging Midlife =

- Directed by: Rob Taylor
- Written by: Rob Taylor; Nic Costa
- Produced by: Nic Costa
- Starring: Paula Abdul; Eddie Griffin; Walter Koenig; Nic Costa; Darielle Mason; Matt Zak; Emily Sweet; Bryna Smith
- Cinematography: Eric Macey
- Edited by: Luke Haigh
- Music by: Lisa Molinaro
- Distributed by: Level 33 Entertainment
- Release date: October 26, 2024 (Austin)
- Running time: 96 minutes
- Country: United States
- Language: English

Raging Midlife is a 2024 American comedy film written by Nic Costa and Rob Taylor, directed by Taylor and starring Paula Abdul, Eddie Griffin, Walter Koenig (in his final film role before his death in 2026), Nic Costa, Matt Zak, Darielle Mason, Emily Sweet, Bryna Smith and Rob Taylor.

== Plot ==
Two wrestling fans venture on a quest to recover 80s memorabilia after a grieving daughter outbids them to satisfy her father's dying wish.

== Cast ==
- Nic Costa as Alex Faulkner
- Matt Zak as Mark Winters
- Rob Taylor as Rob
- Darielle Mason as Tyler Roberts
- Emily Sweet as Mindy Faulkner
- Bryna Smith as Denise
- Paula Abdul as Mary Todd
- Eddie Griffin as El Duque
- Walter Koenig as Otis
- Judy Levitt as Dolores

== Production ==
Raging Midlife was written by Nic Costa and Rob Taylor, who had previously collaborated together on two previous films. Costa and Taylor also act in the film, while Taylor directed. Their home state of Oregon served as the filming location.

The film was first conceived in 2003. In the original script, the plot was going to revolve around the tank top worn by Kurt Russell in Big Trouble in Little China. The plot was changed during a rewrite in 2019 to focus on professional wrestling. Funding was partially attained through Kickstarter, and the film entered production under the title Savage Midlife.

Raging Abe is played by Macho Man impersonator Motch O Mann. Walter Koenig had acted in Taylor's previous film, and in Raging Midlife he acts alongside his wife Judy Levitt.

== Release ==
The film premiered at the Austin Film Festival on October 26, 2024. Distributed by Level 33 Entertainment, the film released in theaters and Video on Demand on March 13, 2025.

== Reception ==
As of July 1, 2026, the film maintains a 100% audience score on Rotten Tomatoes. Mikal CG of Film Threat rated the film an 8 out of 10, while Josh Bell of Crooked Marquee graded the film a C−.

Charlie Giggle of "Indy Film Library" gave Raging Midlife 4.5 out 5 stars, writing "Raging Midlife is a 20 years-in-the-making buddy chase movie which does a tonne of things right, and "[w]atching it, you become very aware of how much care and consideration was put into every joke to make sure it hit, as well as how diligent the team were in making sure the narrative keeps progressing around, with and through the comedy spots[.]"

Jenn Rohm of Selig Film News awarded the film 3 out of 5 stars, writing that "This film was made with a lot of fun and love for the project, which carries over into the final product. The story itself left me feeling like it wasn’t just the characters in the story trying to live out their childhood dreams."

Jeffery X Martin of biffbampop gave the film a more positive review, writing that "Raging Midlife takes wild risks, throwing in bizarre plot lines and twists one doesn’t see coming. It’s a lot like watching wrestling.," while acknowledging that "Nic Costa’s script is too smart to be wacky, too bizarre for a streamlined description," and "[m]uch like wrestling, Raging Midlife has something for everyone if you give it the chance."

Shauntrice Martin of 'The Watercooler' writes "As a bonus, the audience is introduced to Darielle Mason who gets an opportunity to act without carrying the weight of our entire race on her back. The character was well written and a nice departure from how non-Black people typically write Black characters. Black girls get to be love interests. Black girls get to play quirky romcom characters. Black girls can be considered beautiful with their natural hair. I think Frankey would give this at least four Frankey fists on the “Can They Write Black People?” series." Ms. Martin ultimately lauds the film as "an ideal movie for Gen Xers or older Millennials nostalgic for 80s comedies who just want to laugh and destress."

Katy Durand of 'The Daily Californian' added similar praise: "'Raging Midlife' is a film about learning to let go — of childhood obsessions, of grief and of the idea that a single object can fix what's broken in our lives. The fact that it communicates this message through slap-stick comedy, wrestling references and an inexplicable supernatural subplot only adds to its offbeat charm."
