= InAlienable =

- Directed by: Robert Dyke
- Written by: Walter Koenig
- Produced by: Sky Conway
- Starring: Richard Hatch; Marina Sirtis; Erick Avari; Walter Koenig; Jay Acovone; Andrew Koenig; Alan Ruck; Richard Herd; Gary Graham; Philip Anthony-Rodriguez
- Music by: Justin R. Durban
- Distributed by: Renegade Studios
- Release date: December 21, 2007
- Running time: 106 minutes
- Country: United States
- Language: English

InAlienable is a 2007 science fiction horror written and executive produced by Walter Koenig, and directed by Robert Dyke. It was the first collaboration of Koenig and Dyke since their 1989 production of Moontrap. Koenig said that "the story really involves that relationship between the human being and the alien. At first, it's assumed that the alien [is] a parasite growing in a host, but because it has some of the human DNA, it's significantly more than that. Even though it comes from another world, it's a part of our world. Really, it's a love story."

== Plot ==
Dr. Eric Norris remains wracked with guilt after a terrible tragedy that cost him his family, and when he learns that an alien parasite is not only growing inside him but shares his DNA, he develops a fiercely paternal bond with the creature. The alien "might regenerate into a surrogate son to replace his own child who was lost years earlier." Dr Shilling is a scientific research institute administrator who dislikes Norris because he had been mutually in love with Norris's wife, who died; he blames Norris for his own now bleak life and enjoys insulting him. Norris, new love interest Amanda, and attorney Howard Ellis must defend the new child, Benjamin, from being imprisoned by government forces or, worse, destroyed. The courtroom trial covers such issues as habeas corpus and miscegenation.

At first horrified by the growth within him, Eric Norris comes to love the child that he "gives birth to" and names Benjamin. When a court trial begins to take Benjamin away from him, all sorts of arguments are raised about the real meaning of the word "alien." A disturbed man, Emil, brings a gun into the courtroom and shoots Benjamin, to the loss of all concerned.

== Cast ==
- Walter Koenig as Dr. Shilling
- Alan Ruck as Dr. Proway
- Bonnie Aarons as Blue Skinned Woman
- Marina Sirtis as Attorney Barry
- Erick Avari as Howard Ellis
- Courtney Peldon as Amanda Mayfield
- Patricia Tallman as Dr. Klein
- Richard Hatch as Eric Norris
- Andrew Koenig as Emil
- Gary Graham as Andreas Cabrosas
- Priscilla Garita as Miriam
- Jay Acovone as Gerhard
- Gabriel Pimentel as Benjamin (younger)
- Lisa LoCicero as Dr. Magee
- Randy Barnett as Richard Herd
- Jarrett Grode as Medical Employee
- Philip Anthony-Rodriguez as Braxton
- J. G. Hertzler as Dr. Lattis
- Judy Levitt as Judge Deville
- Jeff Rector as Professor Jeffries
- Johnny Drocco as Security guard #2
- Gelbert Coloma as FBI
- Robert Olding as Medical Assistant #1
- Amanda Chism as Protestor
- Vitaliy Versace as Restaurant Patron
- Ceilidh Lamont as Lawyer
- Anthony Fitzgerald as Zachary
- Frances Emma Jenkins as Lab Worker
- Kyle Robertson as Press Photographer #2
- James Runcorn as Bailiff
- Jennifer Gabbert as Hospital Employee #1
- Brandon Ford Green as Court Clerk
- Jett Patrick as Adam
- Matt Lasky as Burly Medical Tech
- George Anton as Restaurant Patron
- Bruce Van Patten as Courtroom observer
- Shweta Thakur as Bar Customer
- Jeremy Clark as Protester
- Bradley Laise as Benjamin (older)
- Patrick Gough as Security #1
- Paul Danner as Sci-Fi Guard
- Peter Renaud as Labworker
- Jonah Runcorn as 10 Year Old Boy
- Marvin Rouillard as Important Man
- Jett Patrick Williams as Adam
- Ashley Walsh as Nurse
- Oliver Rayon as Courtroom Patron
- Bob Ross as Court Observer
- Noe Sanchez as Janitor
- Zahra Zaveri as Bar Customer
- Jane O'Gorman as Bar Patron
- Giovanna Silvestre as Laboratory Employee
- Tim Russ as news anchor

== Production ==
The screenplay was written by Walter Koenig of the original Star Trek series. He told Starburst magazine that he was watching the 2000 World Series with friends, one of whom had appeared in The Blob. "We proceeded to have other conversations along the way about making a film that, at least initially, began the same way as The Blob, with something landing from outer space. And I really took it from there." He told interviewer Chris Wood (who identifies the friend as Anthony Franke), "I wanted to examine the intensity of familial bonding. That was one thing. I also wanted to explore the concept of civil and human rights. But the actual event that sat me down at the computer was when two friends of mine who didn't know each other joined me to watch the New York Yankees play in the World Series back in 2001. My friend Tony Franke had been in the original film of The Blob (1958) and Sky Conway had always been a big fan of the movie. Inspired by Tony's stories, Sky confessed to always wanting to shoot a film about a meteor landing with an alien presence aboard. I holed myself up in my room and took it from there."

It took Koenig a decade to bring the film to fruition. He initially wrote the lead role for himself, but reevaluated his view "that the audience would buy me as a romantic interest", and offered it to Battlestar Galactica's Richard Hatch. He also considered playing attorney Ellis: "In retrospect, I might have had a great deal of fun playing the lawyer — which, I have to admit, Erick Avari so brilliantly played — but I love comedy and I think maybe I could've brought something to it." He chose the role of antagonist Dr. Schilling instead: "I've played heavies before — I had a recurring role on Babylon Five as one — so I'm not unfamiliar with emotional mechanisms and mechanics that go along with it."

Hatch talked about why he accepted the role: "It was very character-driven. It was about people and relationships. It wasn't [just] about some monster or strange creature; it was about human beings having to deal with very morally conflicted situations. I wasn't choosing InAlienable because it was a science-fiction piece, although I love science fiction. I was choosing it, as I choose any movie that I go watch, because it was about something meaningful. It was about real people having to struggle with issues that all of us have to face in our lives."

Marina Sirtis of Star Trek: The Next Generation and other familiar actors from sci-fi franchises were also willing to participate. Koenig's wife, son and daughter had roles on screen.

It was shot on location in Southern California. It is the first feature film made by Renegade Studios, and was released over the internet on a pay-per-view basis.

The film's debut public screening was cut short by Koenig, as the visual quality on the screen at Conglomeration! 2008 was not up to his standards.

== Release ==
This direct-to-DVD film made its debut on the Internet on a pay-per-view basis; it premiered online on December 15, 2008 with a nominal $2.99 fee charged for watching it.

== Reception ==
The film received mixed reviews.

The website Brutal As Hell wrote that the movie is "a film cheesier than a Kraft dairy farm and far more likable than it has any right to be," while faulting it for being "preachy, corny and overlong, with a shameless heart-string yanking climax." Home Media Magazine wrote, "Like an episode of The Outer Limits, the story veers from expectations, merging traditional sci-fi motifs with the framework of a conventional courtroom drama... It's more thought-provoking than typical 'B'-movie fare, even if the proceedings are a bit hackneyed." Total Sci-Fi Online granted only 1 star out of 10, saying, "At the core of InAlienable is an idea around which a terrific movie could be made, but unfortunately this isn't it." The website DVD Verdict wrote, "A courtroom thriller masquerading as a sci-fi drama, InAlienable is an intriguing effort with higher acting caliber than one might expect... InAlienable is far from groundbreaking cinema, but Koenig plays around with a lot of interesting ideas and themes. Not only does he play the slimy Schilling with tang, he also builds up his story well, keeping us hooked most of the way... What anchors the film is Hatch's powerful performance, but Peldon also makes a strong impression as his partner and lover."
