= The Theory of Everything (2006 film) =

2006 American drama film

- DVD cover
- Screenplay by: David de Vos
- Directed by: David de Vos
- Music by: Brian Mann
- Country of origin: United States
- Original language: English

Production
- Producer: Blue Yonder Pictures
- Running time: 86 minutes

Original release
- Release: November 1, 2006

The Theory of Everything is a 2006 television drama film directed by David de Vos. It was first broadcast on the Trinity Broadcast Network on November 1, 2006.

== Plot ==
Doug (David de Vos) is a flight instructor and owner of a pilot school. He, his wife Abby and their two daughters, Lindsay (Janna Savatchee) and Amanda (Amanda de Vos) face serious financial problems, as they are near financial ruin, and need $300,000 to expand the pilot school.

Doug has to work hard and has hardly any time for his family, even arriving at home late on Christmas Eve. During the meal Doug receives a phone call from a lawyer who informs him that his parents are not his biological parents, but that he was adopted by an open adoption by them. The lawyer asks him to come to a meeting, where problems concerning his biological father are to be discussed.

The lawyer introduces him to his half sister, Delilah (Mary Jo DuPrey), who was disowned from their father. Her only interest is to have her father judged unfit in order to sell his property. The lawyer asks whether they want to look after the property and their father. If they would, they would also take responsibility of him. Doug decides to do so without asking Abby.

Doug goes to see his biological father, Dr. Gene Holland, who initially shoots at him with a gun when Doug arrives, only to subsequently recognize Doug as his son. The house is in chaos, but Gene seems not to be aware of it. His only interest seems to be to find the solution for the Theory of everything an equation long regarded as the Holy Grail of physics, which Gene thinks may prove the existence of God.

Doug tells him about his financial problems, and Gene wants to help him. They create a financial plan and find investors that give Doug the necessary capital. While celebrating, Gene falls to ground and is taken to the hospital. There, Doug is informed by a doctor who knows Gene very well that Gene suffers from prion disease. Doug relates this to Abby, and they decide to move in with Gene, as Doug knows that his father will die within six months to a year. Gene befriends Doug's family, and tells them about Doug's biological mother, Lory, whom Gene loved very much, and died of cancer. Gene reveals that the reason he gave Doug up for adoption was that his wife decided to give birth to Doug and "go to Jesus" instead of undergoing radiation therapy.

The illness halts Gene's studies, and his daughter, Delilah, manages to get a verdict that incapacitates Gene. The house is destroyed immediately after the police take him out of the house and put him in a hospital. Doug salvages Gene's work and brings it to the hospital, as Gene sees Doug as his last hope to help him to finish his work. Doug assists Gene in his work until Gene again loses his consciousness.

Some time later, Doug sees Gene in the garden of the hospital. Gene can barely remember Doug. He knows that he was searching for something, but has forgotten what it was. Doug and Abby decide to abduct Gene and bring him via private plane to Alaska, where Gene can see the aurora borealis. Upon seeing the borealis, Gene says that he no longer fears death, as he thinks that he found the path to Jesus and his late wife, Lory. Doug eventually gives Gene's papers to physics researchers.

== Critical reception ==
The Dove Worldview wrote that the film is powerful. Dennis Amith writes that the film "is a wonderful Christian film". James Strickland wrote that it is a great film.

== Awards ==
- 2007 Crown Award Winner - Best Picture (Gold)
- 2007 Crown Award Winner - Best Evangelistic Film (Gold)
- 2007 Crown Award Winner - Best Drama over $250,000 (Gold)
