= Gilchrist Stuart =

British actor (1919–1977)

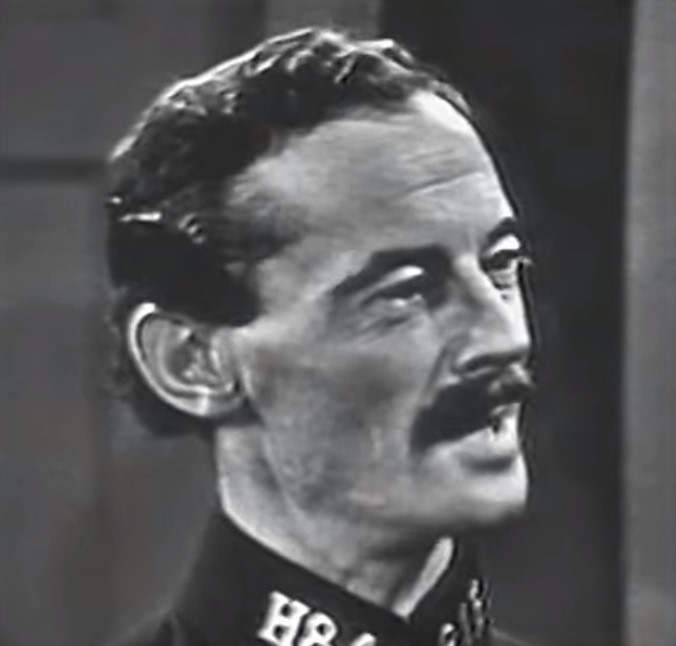
- Born: Derek Grist; 19 January 1919; London, England
- Died: 8 June 1977 (aged 58); Los Angeles, California
- Occupation: Actor

Gilchrist Stuart (born Derek Grist; 19 January 1919—8 June 1977) was a British actor. He was best known for playing Franz, the butler of Captain Von Trapp in Academy Award winning film The Sound of Music. He was sometimes credited as Gil Stuart.

== Biography ==
He was born in London as Derek Grist. He studied at Royal Academy of Dramatic Arts. He came to Hollywood under contract to Metro Goldwyn Meyer.

== Career ==
Stuart played supporting or minor roles in such films as A Yank in the R.A.F., where he played Wales, Sword in the Desert, Designing Woman, Assault on a Queen, Morituri, Doctor Dolittle. He also appeared in films with his The Sound of Music co-stars: he appeared in Forever Amber and The Lost World alongside Richard Haydn, and in Star! alongside Julie Andrews. He also appeared as an actor in episode of The Alfred Hitchcock Hour titled A Nice Touch, opposite Anne Baxter and George Segal, as well as in other television shows. He appeared in Red Skelton Show for the period of over 16 years.

His most notable role was in the film The Sound of Music, which won five Oscars. He played the butler of captain Georg von Trapp. In the beginning of the film, Maria mistakes him for the captain. He was recommended by another member of the film's team and was a familiar face to director Robert Wise, who offered him the role shortly before the start of the filming in March 1964. In her memoir Forever Liesl: A Memoir of The Sound of Music, Charmian Carr described him as "a marvelous character actor, very reserved", and being part of the "British group" of actors on the set.

== Filmography ==
Year	Title	Role	Notes
1941	Charley's Aunt	Teammate	Uncredited
1941	A Yank in the R.A.F.	Wales	
1947	Forever Amber	Cavalier	Uncredited
1948	Fighter Squadron	English Photographer	Uncredited
1949	Sword in the Desert	Radio Operator	
1950	When Willie Comes Marching Home	British Lieutenant	Uncredited
1950	Fancy Pants	Wicket Keeper	Uncredited
1952	Bronco Buster	McDermott	Uncredited
1952	Botany Bay	Sailor	Uncredited
1953	Rogue's March	Andy	Uncredited
1953	The Desert Rats	Captain	Uncredited
1953	East of Sumatra	Mr. Vickers	Uncredited
1953	King of the Khyber Rifles	Officer of the Week	Uncredited
1955	The Sea Chase	Fisherman	Uncredited
1955	The Scarlet Coat	Officer	Uncredited
1955	The King's Thief	Clerk	Uncredited
1957	Designing Woman	Mr. Orvac	Uncredited
1957	Les Girls	English Photographer	Uncredited
1957	The Devil's Hairpin	Salesman	Uncredited
1960	The Lost World	Reporter	Uncredited
1962	Mutiny on the Bounty	Minor Role	Uncredited
1963	The Alfred Hitchcock Hour	Actor	Season 2 Episode 2: "A Nice Touch"
1965	The Alfred Hitchcock Hour	Ralph the Butler	Season 3 Episode 18: "The Trap"
1965	The Alfred Hitchcock Hour	British Man	Season 3 Episode 26: "The Monkey's Paw - A Retelling"
1965	The Sound of Music	Franz	
1965	Morituri	Englishman	Uncredited
1965	Do Not Disturb	Man in Cab	Uncredited
1966	Assault on a Queen	Officer #1	
1967	Doctor Dolittle	The Vicar	Uncredited
1968	Star!	Footman	Uncredited
1969	Hook, Line & Sinker	Night Manager	Uncredited
1969	Justine	British Army Officer	Uncredited
1970	Which Way to the Front?	Mr. Firestone, the Tailor	Uncredited
1971	The Andromeda Strain	Man	Uncredited
1972	Hickey & Boggs	Farrow	
1972	Sanford and Son		
