= Walter Koenig =

American actor and screenwriter (1936–2026)

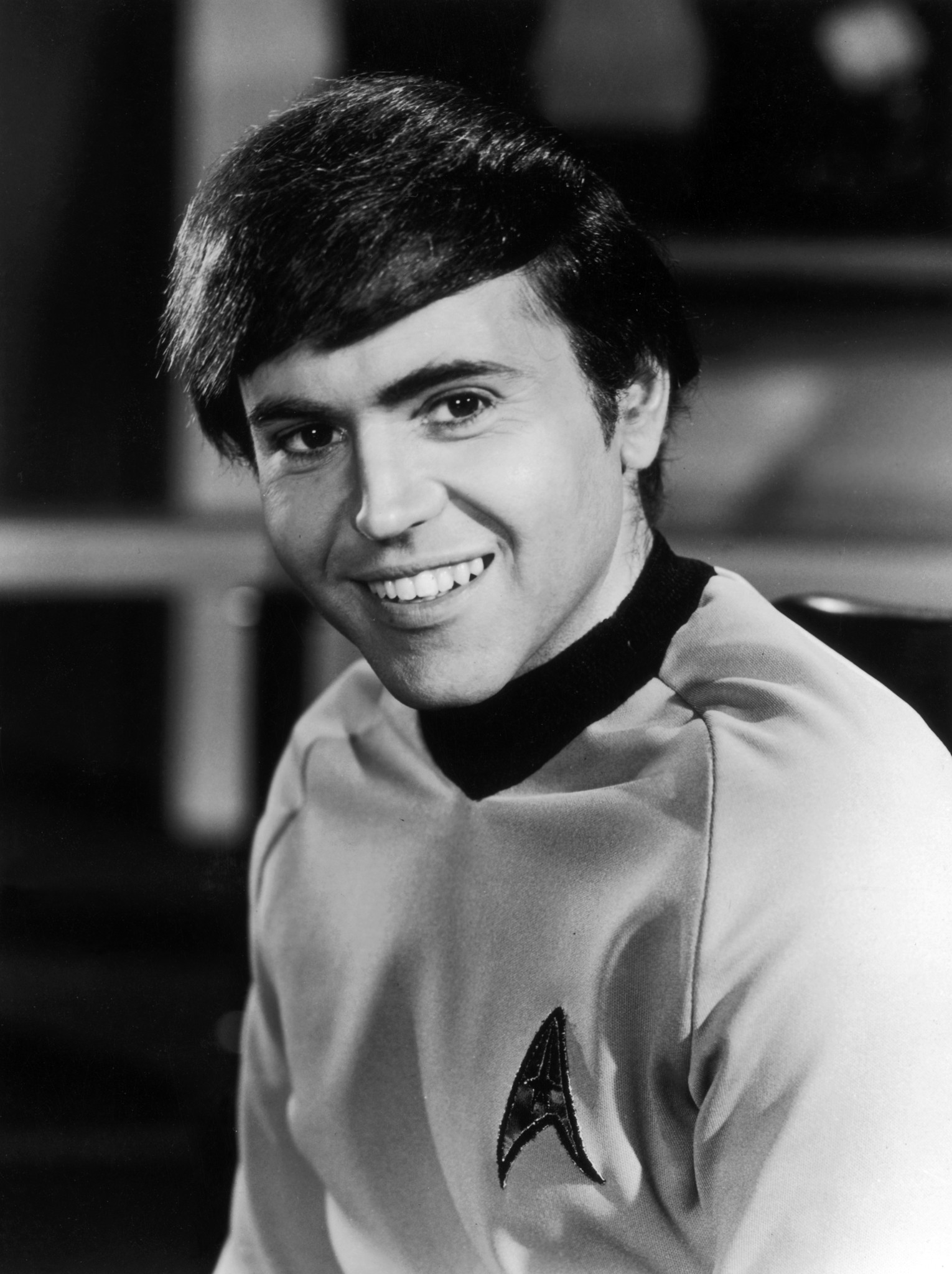
- Koenig as Pavel Chekov on Star Trek
- Born: Walter Marvin Koenig; September 14, 1936; Chicago, Illinois, U.S.
- Died: October 25, 2026 (aged 90); North Hollywood, California, U.S.
- Resting place: Hollywood Forever Cemetery
- Education: Grinnell College (attended); University of California, Los Angeles (BA); Neighborhood Playhouse School of the Theatre (attended)
- Occupations: Actor; screenwriter
- Years active: 1962–2024
- Known for: Pavel Chekov; Alfred Bester
- Television: Star Trek; Babylon 5
- Spouse: Judy Levitt (m. 1965; died 2022)
- Children: 2, including Andrew
- Relatives: Jimmy Pardo (son-in-law)

Walter Marvin Koenig (/ˈkeɪnɪɡ/ KAY-nig; September 14, 1936 – October 25, 2026) was an American actor and screenwriter. He began acting professionally in the mid-1960s and quickly rose to prominence for his supporting role as Ensign Pavel Chekov in Star Trek (1967–1969). He went on to reprise this role in all six original-cast Star Trek films and in Star Trek: Generations (1994). He also acted in several other series and films including Goodbye, Raggedy Ann (1971), The Questor Tapes (1974), and Babylon 5 (1993). As a screenwriter, Koenig worked on Land of the Lost (1974), Family (1976), What Really Happened to the Class of '65? (1977) and The Powers of Matthew Star (1982), and wrote several books.

== Early life ==
Walter Marvin Koenig was born in Chicago, Illinois, on September 14, 1936, the son of businessman Isadore Koenig and his wife Sarah (née Strauss). They moved to the Inwood neighborhood of Manhattan when Walter was a child, where he went to school. Koenig's parents were Russian Jewish immigrants from the Soviet Union; his family had been living in Lithuania when they emigrated, and they shortened their surname from Königsberg to Koenig.

Koenig's father was a communist who was investigated by the FBI during the McCarthy era.

Koenig attended Grinnell College in Grinnell, Iowa, with a pre-med major. He transferred to UCLA and received a Bachelor of Arts in psychology. After a professor encouraged Koenig to become an actor, he attended Neighborhood Playhouse School of the Theatre in New York City with fellow students Dabney Coleman, Christopher Lloyd, and James Caan.

== Career ==
=== Early work ===
Koenig in The Great Adventure (1963)

In Gene Roddenberry's first television production, the 1963–64 NBC series The Lieutenant, Koenig played a significant role as United States Marine Corps Sgt. John Delwyn, who is recommended for Officer Candidates School by the series protagonist, Lt William T. (Tiberius) Rice, played by Gary Lockwood. In 1964, Koenig portrayed a New York City juvenile gang leader in an adaptation of Harlan Ellison's Memos from Purgatory for The Alfred Hitchcock Hour.

=== Star Trek ===
Koenig began playing Ensign Pavel Chekov, navigator on the USS Enterprise, in the original Star Trek television series in the second season, and continued in the role in all of the films featuring the original cast, including Star Trek Generations (1994). Koenig was unfamiliar with science fiction before being cast in Star Trek.

One of only two actors to audition, he was cast as Chekov almost immediately, primarily because he resembled British actor and singer Davy Jones of the Monkees. Show creator Gene Roddenberry hoped that Koenig would increase the show's appeal to young people. The studio's publicity department, however, falsely attributed Chekov's inclusion to an article in Pravda that complained about the lack of Russians in Star Trek.

As the 30-year-old's hair was already receding, costume designers fashioned a Davy Jones-style "moptop" hairpiece for him. In later episodes, his own hair grew out enough to accomplish the look with a comb-over.

Roddenberry asked him to "ham up" a Russian accent to add a note of comic relief to the series. Koenig said the accent was inspired by his father, who had the same difficulty with the "v" sound.

I was one of only two people who auditioned for the part, which is quite extraordinary. Considering that this has so materially affected the last 35 years of my life ... a couple of hours after I auditioned, I heard that I had gotten the role.

Most of Koenig's fan mail came from children, and his popularity with fans contributed to him soon receiving a contract as a regular Star Trek cast member. This surprised Koenig, who had initially been told that Chekov would only be a recurring role.

When the early episodes for season two of Star Trek were filmed, George Takei was initially jealous of Koenig's more prominent role in the series, but later on they became friends. Koenig served as best man at Takei's wedding to Brad Altman in September 2008.

The character of Chekov did not appear in the animated Star Trek series. The show's producers had declined to hire Koenig for budgetary reasons and the actor wasn't even aware that he would not be included in the cast until a fan informed him at a Star Trek convention. Nevertheless, Roddenberry hired Koenig as a writer and purchased his script for a 1973 episode of the show titled "The Infinite Vulcan". Koenig later confessed that he was upset at being left out of the cast of the animated series. "The Infinite Vulcan" made him the first cast member to write a Star Trek story for television.

He received Saturn Award nominations for Best Supporting Actor in a Film for both Star Trek II: The Wrath of Khan (1982) and Star Trek IV: The Voyage Home (1986). Koenig reprised the role of Chekov for the fan webseries Star Trek: New Voyages, "To Serve All My Days," and the independent Sky Conway/Tim Russ film, Star Trek: Of Gods and Men, both in 2006, and Star Trek: Renegades in 2015.

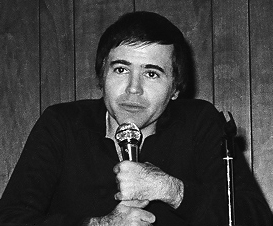
Koenig in 1980

In the last episode of the third season of Star Trek: Picard, aired in 2023, Koenig voiced an audio transmission from Federation President Anton Chekov, implied to be Pavel's son; the name references Anton Yelchin, who played Chekov in director J. J. Abrams Star Trek films.

Koenig said that his favorite Star Trek episode was "Spectre of the Gun".

=== Later work ===
Typecast as Chekov, Koenig found a great disparity between the adulation from Trekkies at Star Trek conventions and his obscurity in Hollywood, stating, "People are interested in Chekov, not me." Before the Trek movies started, Koenig found some work as a writer. He submitted freelance scripts to a number of shows, including What Really Happened to the Class of '65? (1977)

Koenig played "Oro" in two episodes of the Canadian science fiction television series The Starlost, which aired in 1973 on Canada's CTV television network. He also appeared in the films Goodbye, Raggedy Ann (1971) and The Questor Tapes (1974).

He was awarded the Inkpot Award in 1982.

After Chekov, Koenig had a recurring role as Psi Cop Alfred Bester on the television series Babylon 5. He was a "Special Guest Star" in twelve episodes and, at the end of the third season, the production company applied for an Emmy nomination on his behalf. He was slated to play Bester on the spin-off series Crusade, but the series was cancelled before his episode was filmed. The character name of "Alfred Bester" was an homage to the science fiction writer of the same name.

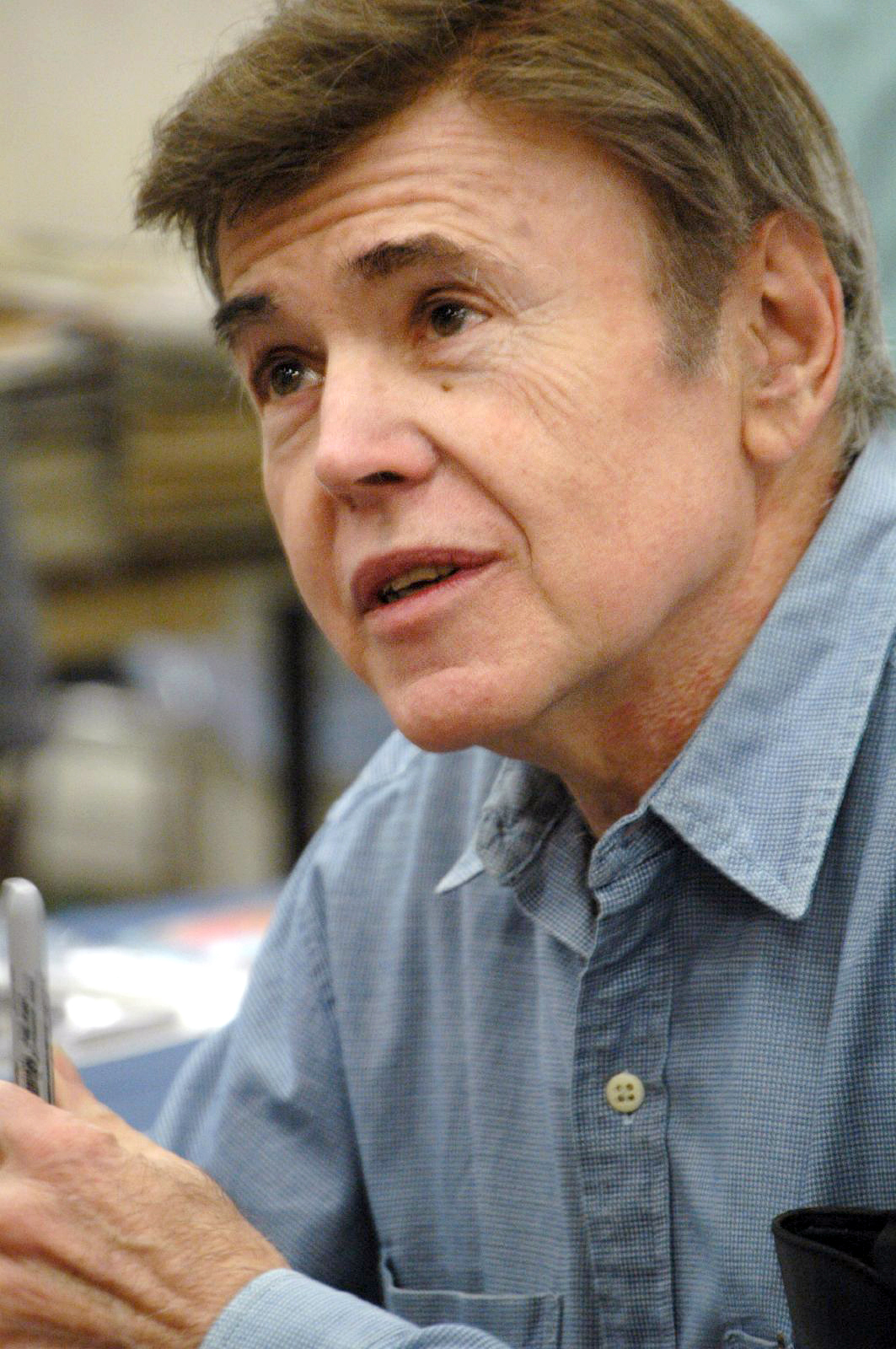
Koenig at ComicCon Dallas in 2007

Koenig's film, stage, and television roles spanned 50 years. He played roles ranging from a teenage gang leader (Alfred Hitchcock Presents) to Scandinavian fiancé Gunnar in the Gidget episode entitled "Gidget's Foreign Policy", to a Las Vegas entertainer (I Spy). He returned to space with a starring role in the 1989 film Moontrap and played a futuristic dictator in the video game Maximum Surge.

During the early 1990s, he starred in a touring production of the play The Boys in Autumn, playing a middle-aged Tom Sawyer, who reunites with childhood friend Huckleberry Finn. Fellow Trek actor Mark Lenard played Finn.

In addition to acting, he wrote several films (I Wish I May, You're Never Alone When You're a Schizophrenic), one-act plays, and a handful of episodes for TV shows: Star Trek: The Animated Series (1973), Land of the Lost, (1974) Family (1976) and The Powers of Matthew Star (1982).

He wrote several books, including Warped Factors: A Neurotic's Guide to the Universe (an autobiography), Chekov's Enterprise (a journal kept during the filming of Star Trek: The Motion Picture) and Buck Alice and the Actor-Robot (a science fiction novel), which was re-released in 2006. He created his own comic book series called Raver, which was published by Malibu Comics in the early 1990s, and appeared as a "special guest star" in an issue of the comic book Eternity Smith, which features him prominently on its cover.

In 2013, Koenig released the graphic novel Walter Koenig's Things To Come with artist J.C. Baez, published by Bluewater Comics, which compiled the four issues of the miniseries of the same name.

Koenig taught classes in acting and directing at UCLA, the Actor's Alley Repertory Company in Los Angeles, the Sherwood Oaks Experimental Film College, and the California School of Professional Psychology at Alliant International University.

In 1987, Koenig directed his original one-act play The Secret Life of Lily Langtree at the Theatre of NOTE in Los Angeles. In 1989, Koenig starred in the science fiction film Moontrap as mission commander Colonel Jason Grant.

Koenig in March 2023

In 1997, Koenig starred in Drawing Down the Moon, an independent film about a Wiccan woman who attempts to open a homeless shelter in a small Pennsylvania town. Koenig played Joe Merchant, a local crime lord obsessed with chaos theory who sends his thugs to intimidate her into shutting down the shelter.

In 2002, he directed stage versions of two of the original The Twilight Zone episodes for Letter Entertainment. In 2004, Koenig co-starred in Mad Cowgirl, an independent movie about a meat-packing health inspector dying from a brain disorder, in which he played televangelist Pastor Dylan.

He received the 2,479th star of the Hollywood Walk of Fame on September 10, 2012.

In 2013, Koenig ventured into the steampunk genre, starring in the short film Cowboys & Engines alongside Malcolm McDowell and Richard Hatch. In 2017, Koenig appeared in the 1980s throwback Neil Stryker and the Tyrant of Time from director Rob Taylor, battling puppet goblins as science officer Ray Nabroski. In 2018, he again appeared opposite Richard Hatch in the science-fiction drama Diminuendo, which was Hatch's last performance before his death.

Koenig's final role was in the 2024 film Raging Midlife, where he played Otis.

=== Humanitarian work ===
In 2007, Koenig was asked by the human rights group U.S. Campaign for Burma to help in their grassroots campaign about the humanitarian crisis in Burma. He visited refugee camps along the Burma–Thailand border.

== Personal life and death ==
Koenig married actress Judy Levitt in 1965; she died in 2022. In 1968, they had a son, actor Andrew, who died by suicide in 2010. The couple also had a daughter, Danielle, a comedian and writer, who is married to comedian Jimmy Pardo.

Koenig died from cardiopulmonary arrest complicated by congestive heart failure at his home in North Hollywood, Los Angeles, on October 25, 2026, at the age of 90. He was cremated and his ashes are buried at Hollywood Forever Cemetery, where his son Andrew is interred.

== Filmography ==
=== Film ===
| Year | Title | Role | Notes | Ref. |
|---|---|---|---|---|
| 1962 | The Norman Vincent Peale Story | | | |
| 1974 | Nightmare Honeymoon | Deputy Sheriff | | |
| 1979 | Star Trek: The Motion Picture | Pavel Chekov | | |
| 1982 | Star Trek II: The Wrath of Khan | Pavel Chekov | | |
| 1984 | Star Trek III: The Search for Spock | Pavel Chekov | | |
| 1986 | Star Trek IV: The Voyage Home | Pavel Chekov | | |
| 1989 | Moontrap | Col. Jason Grant | | |
| 1989 | Star Trek V: The Final Frontier | Pavel Chekov | | |
| 1991 | Star Trek VI: The Undiscovered Country | Pavel Chekov | | |
| 1994 | Star Trek Generations | Pavel Chekov | | |
| 1996 | Sworn to Justice | Dr. Breitenheim | | |
| 1997 | Drawing Down the Moon | Joe Merchant | | |
| 1997 | Trekkies | Himself | Documentary | |
| 2002 | Repli-Kate | —N/a | Executive producer | |
| 2006 | Mad Cowgirl | Pastor Dylan | | |
| 2007 | InAlienable | Dr. Shilling | | |
| 2008 | Star Trek: Of Gods and Men | Captain Chekov | Fan film | |
| 2009 | Scream of the Bikini | | | |
| 2013 | Blue Dream | Lassie | | |
| 2015 | Star Trek: Renegades | Admiral Chekov | Fan film | |
| 2016 | Star Trek: Captain Pike | Admiral Harlan Sobol | Fan film | |
| 2016 | Surge of Power: Revenge of the Sequel | Himself | | |
| 2017 | Neil Stryker and the Tyrant of Time | Ray Nabroski (future) | | |
| 2018 | Diminuendo | Milton Green | | |
| 2018 | Who is Martin Danzig? | Martin Danzig | | |
| 2019 | Woman in Motion | Himself | Documentary | |
| 2020 | Unbelievable!!!!! | Fireman Frank | | |
| 2024 | Raging Midlife | Otis | | |

=== Television ===
| Year | Title | Role | Notes | Ref. |
|---|---|---|---|---|
| 1962 | Combat! | | Uncredited | |
| 1963 | General Hospital | Charlie Turner | Pilot episode; Credit only | |
| 1963–65 | Mr. Novak | Alexsei Dubov, Jim Carsey, Paul Ryder | 3 episodes | |
| 1963 | The Great Adventure | Cy Bedrozian | Episode: "Six Wagons to the Sea" | |
| 1964 | The Lieutenant | Sgt. John Delwyn | Episode: "Mother Enemy" | |
| 1964 | The Alfred Hitchcock Hour | Tiger | Episode: "Memo from Purgatory" | |
| 1965 | Ben Casey | Tom Davis | Episode: "A Rambling Discourse on Egyptian Water Clocks" | |
| 1965 | Gidget | Gunnar | Episode: "Gidget's Foreign Policy" | |
| 1966 | I Spy | Bobby Seville | Episode: "Sparrowhawk" | |
| 1966 | Jericho | Paul | Episode: "Both Ends Against the Riddle" | |
| 1967–69 | Star Trek: The Original Series | Pavel Chekov | Seasons 2-3 regular; 36 episodes | |
| 1968 | Mannix | Recovery addict in meeting | Episode: "Delayed Action" | |
| 1970 | Medical Center | Harry Seller | Episode: "Between Dark and Daylight" | |
| 1970 | The Virginian | Paul Elrich | Episode: "Crooked Corner" | |
| 1971 | Ironside | Leo | Episode: "The Summer Soldier" | |
| 1971 | Goodbye, Raggedy Ann | Jerry | TV movie | |
| 1973 | The Starlost | Oro | 2 episodes | |
| 1973 | Star Trek: The Animated Series | —N/a | Writer; Episode: "The Infinite Vulcan" | |
| 1974 | The Questor Tapes | Administrative Assistant | TV movie | |
| 1974 | Land of the Lost | —N/a | Writer; Episode: "The Stranger" | |
| 1976 | Columbo | Sgt. Johnson | Episode: "Fade in to Murder" | |
| 1978 | Family | —N/a | Writer; Episode: "Just Friends" | |
| 1982 | Bring 'Em Back Alive | Toder | Episode: "The Reel World of Frank Buck" | |
| 1982 | The Powers of Matthew Star | —N/a | Writer; Episode: "Mother" | |
| 1990 | The Real Ghostbusters | Vladimir Pavel Maximov | Voice; Episode: "Russian About" | |
| 1994–98 | Babylon 5 | Alfred Bester | 12 episodes | |
| 1996 | Star Trek: Deep Space Nine | Pavel Chekov | Episode: "Trials and Tribble-ations"; Archive footage | |
| 1997 | Space Cadets | Himself | Episode: "Blobs vs. Things" | |
| 1998 | Diagnosis: Murder | Quinn Trask | Episode: "Alienated" | |
| 2001 | Son of the Beach | General Dimitri Sukitov | Episode: "From Russia, with Johnson" | |
| 2002 | Futurama | Himself | Voice; Episode: "Where No Fan Has Gone Before" | |
| 2003 | Game Over | Drexel | TV movie | |
| 2006 | Star Trek: New Voyages | Lt. Pavel Chekov | Episode: "To Serve All My Days" | |
| 2008 | Bone Eater | Coogan | TV movie | |
| 2017–18 | Stretch Armstrong and the Flex Fighters | Mr. Savic, Old Man | Voice; 11 episodes | |
| 2023 | Star Trek: Picard | President Anton Chekov | Voice cameo; Episode: "The Last Generation" | |

=== Video games ===
| Year | Title | Role | Notes | Ref. |
|---|---|---|---|---|
| 1994 | Star Trek: 25th Anniversary | Ens. Pavel Chekov | Voice, CD-ROM version | |
| 1995 | Star Trek: Judgment Rites | Ens. Pavel Chekov | Voice, CD-ROM version | |
| 1996 | Maximum Surge | Drexel | Cancelled | |
| 1997 | Star Trek: Starfleet Academy | Commander Pavel Chekov | Voice | |
| 1997 | Star Trek Generations | Commander Pavel Chekov | Voice | |
| 2003 | Star Trek: Shattered Universe | Commander Pavel Chekov | Voice | |
| 2010 | Star Trek Online | Pavel Chekov | Voice | |

== Bibliography ==
- Chekov's Enterprise (1980)
- Buck Alice and the Actor-Robot (1988)
- Warped Factors: A Neurotic's Guide to the Universe (1998)
- Walter Koenig's Things to Come (2012)
- Walter Koenig's Raver (2015)
- Beaming Up and Getting Off: Life Before and Beyond Star Trek (2020)
