= Buccaneer's Girl =

1950 film by Frederick de Cordova

- Theatrical poster
- Directed by: Frederick de Cordova
- Written by: Joseph Hoffman; Harold Shumate
- Story by: Joe May; Samuel R. Golding
- Produced by: Robert Arthur; John W. Rogers
- Starring: Yvonne De Carlo; Philip Friend; Robert Douglas; Elsa Lanchester; Andrea King
- Cinematography: Russell Metty
- Edited by: Otto Ludwig
- Music by: Walter Scharf
- Production company: Universal Pictures
- Distributed by: Universal Pictures
- Release date: March 1, 1950 (United States)
- Running time: 77 minutes
- Country: United States
- Language: English
- Box office: 2,007,030 admissions (France)

Buccaneer's Girl is a 1950 American Technicolor romantic adventure film directed by Frederick de Cordova and starring Yvonne De Carlo and Philip Friend.

== Plot ==
Deborah McCoy, a New Orleans singer, is aboard a ship that is captured by the forces of the pirate captain Fredric Baptiste. Deborah escapes in New Orleans and is hired as a singer by Mme. Brizar, the proprietor of a school for young ladies. Deborah is sent to a party held by Captain Robert Kingston, the head of the Seaman's Fund. She learns that Kingston is Baptiste, who uses his piracy activities to subsidize the fund, which supports local sailors. The businessman Narbonne discovers Baptiste's ruse and sets a trap for him. Deborah overhears Narbonne's plan and joins Baptiste on the open seas, where they attack Narbonne's ships. Baptiste is captured by Narbonne but Deborah helps him escape.

== Cast ==
- Yvonne De Carlo as Deborah McCoy
- Philip Friend as Frederic Baptiste
- Robert Douglas as Narbonne
- Elsa Lanchester as Mme. Brizar
- Andrea King as Arlene Villon
- Norman Lloyd as Patout
- Jay C. Flippen as Jared Hawkins
- Henry Daniell as Captain Duval
- Douglass Dumbrille as Captain Martos
- Verna Felton as Dowager
- John Qualen as Vegetable Man
- Connie Gilchrist as Vegetable Woman
- Ben Welden as Tom
- Dewey Robinson as Kryl
- Peggie Castle as Cleo

== Production ==
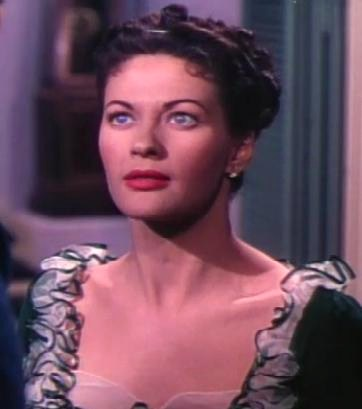
Yvonne De Carlo as Deborah McCoy, the title role

The film was originally known as Mademoiselle McCoy and the Pirates. In May 1949, Joseph Hoffman was hired to work on the script.

Yvonne De Carlo was cast at the very early stages of the project, and Paul Christian was originally announced as her costar. Christian was replaced by Philip Friend, who was cast on the basis of his performance in another Universal film, Sword in the Desert (1949). Robert Douglas was cast as the lead villain in the film, the first of a three-picture contract he had signed with Universal. The supporting cast included Ethel Ince, widow of John Ince, playing her first role in 30 years.

When asked about the film, De Carlo said, "What a dilly! I had six knock down, drag out fights in that one. And I was just recuperating from an operation."

De Carlo related in her memoirs that while she was touring Argentina, she received a phone call from Eva Perón praising her films, particularly Buccaneer's Girl. De Carlo wrote: "It later dawned on me that she could identify with the character of Deborah McCoy, who capitalized on her position as a prostitute to move up into high society."

== Reception ==
In a contemporary review for The New York Times, critic A. H. Weiler wrote: "There is an eerie quality about 'Buccaneer's Girl,' which has nothing to do with the Technicolor in which it is handsomely photographed or with its songs which struck this corner as ordinary. But this yarn about a lass who becomes involved with a gentleman pirate gives a viewer the strange impression that he has seen it all before and, in many cases, done in a more engaging fashion. The swashbuckling lads complete with beards, bandannas and cutlasses, the hand-to-hand battles at sea, and love and intrigue in old New Orleans are all included in this multicolored melange of adventure, romance and villainy. But it is a familiar and certainly unimpressive masquerade hardly worth all those fancy trappings."

Reviewer Marjory Adams of The Boston Globe called the film "a run-of-the-mill adventure" and "merely a background for Miss De Carlo's lush curves, and her singing and dancing."
