= Deported (film) =

1950 film by Robert Siodmak

- Theatrical release poster
- Directed by: Robert Siodmak
- Screenplay by: Robert Buckner
- Story by: Lionel Shapiro
- Based on: Paradise Lost by Lionel Shapiro
- Produced by: Robert Buckner
- Starring: Märta Torén; Jeff Chandler; Claude Dauphin
- Cinematography: William H. Daniels
- Edited by: Ralph Dawson
- Music by: Walter Scharf
- Color process: Black and white
- Production company: Universal Pictures
- Distributed by: Universal Pictures
- Release dates: November 1, 1950 (New York); November 7, 1950 (Los Angeles)
- Running time: 89 minutes
- Country: United States
- Language: English
- Budget: $550,000 (est.)

Deported is a 1950 American crime film noir directed by Robert Siodmak and starring Märta Torén, Jeff Chandler and Claude Dauphin. It was produced and distributed by Universal Pictures.

== Plot ==
An American gangster deported back to his native Italy woos a countess in a plot to bring loot into the country.

== Cast ==
- Märta Torén as the Countess di Lorenzi
- Jeff Chandler as Vittorio Mario Sparducci, alias Vic Smith
- Claude Dauphin as Bucelli
- Marina Berti as Gina
- Richard Rober as Bemardo Gervaso
- Silvio Mindotti as Armando Sparducci
- Carlo Rizzo as Guido Caruso
- Mimi Aguglia as Teresa Sparducci
- Adriano Ambrogi as Father Genaro
- Michael Tor as Ernesto Pampilone
- Erminio Spalla as Benjamino Barda
- Dino Nardi as Donadi
- Guido Celano as Aldo Brescia
- Tito Vuolo as Postal clerk

== Production ==
The film was originally titled Paradise Lost '49 and was to star Dana Andrews, who had appeared in Sword in the Desert, also produced by Robert Buckner. Andrews became unavailable and Victor Mature and John Garfield were discussed as possible alternatives. Eventually the lead role was assigned to Jeff Chandler after he had impressed Universal Studios with his performance in Sword of the Desert and Broken Arrow. Chandler later said: "I don't know why I got it. Maybe it's because I'm saving them money." Chandler required a three-week leave of absence from the Our Miss Brooks radio program in order to make the film. His second daughter was born during the production of the film.

Much of the film was shot in Italy on location in Naples, Siena and other points in Tuscany. Of the actors, only Chandler and Märta Torén were brought from the U.S., with the rest coming from Italy or France. Filming began early in 1950.

Writer-producer Robert Buckner praised filming on location in Italy. He said that Universal had set aside $300,000 in frozen currency to make the film, of which he spent only $117,000. He also said that if Chandler had not been required to return to the U.S. to fulfill a radio commitment requiring three weeks of filming in a Hollywood studio, another $100,000 could have been saved.

An $800,000 plagiarism suit was filed against Universal Pictures by Rome-based American author Michael Stern, who alleged that he had written a manuscript in 1948 that he submitted to Kurt Siodmak, brother of the film's director Robert Siodmak. Stern claimed that Kurt Siodmak introduced him to his brother, who assured Stern that something would come of the manuscript.

The film is said to be based on the famous Italian gangster Lucky Luciano. However, Chandler denied this, saying that the character that he played was that of a small-time gangster, "and what happens after he lands is quite different from what happened to Luciano. I understand Luciano was really disappointed when our producer, Robert Buckner, mentioned this to him."

== Reception ==
In a contemporary review for The New York Times, critic Bosley Crowther called Deported "nothing more exciting than a straight pot-boiler" and wrote:

Everything about this picture indicates that it was contrived as a sheer piece of fabrication under conditions which circumstances imposed. The story by Lionel Shapiro is precisely what you might expect from a writer assigned to do a fable for an American company to shoot in Italy, it being no more than a fiction about an American gangster, deported to the country whence he came, who falls for a beautiful young countess and is morally regenerated by her love. And the screen play by Robert Buckner is a talky and tedious affair, tainted by that sympathy for the gangster which is peculiar to many Hollywood films. Furthermore, the principal performers, Jeff Chandler and Marta Toren, betray an accretion of affectation which sharply contrasts with the broad ebullience of the Italian cast. ... Against the most satisfying backgrounds, Robert Siodmak has directed a cast in a display of disappointing claptrap. It makes one sad to behold such a waste.

Critic Philip K. Scheuer of the Los Angeles Times wrote: "Director Siodmak and his actors serve up a melodrama that, while it tends to be lethargic between courses (that lazy climate of Southern Italy, no doubt), should prove palatable enough week-to-week fare. The scenery—Naples, Siena, Colle Val D'Elsa—provides an illusion, at any rate, of freshness, even though the inevitable firearms finish might have been photographed in any old warehouse much closer to home and probably was."

== See also ==
- List of American films of 1950
