= Drango =

1957 film

- Film poster
- Directed by: Hall Bartlett; Jules Bricken
- Written by: Hall Bartlett
- Produced by: Hall Bartlett; Jules Bricken; Meyer Mishkin; Jeff Chandler
- Starring: Jeff Chandler; Joanne Dru; Julie London; Donald Crisp; Ronald Howard; Milburn Stone
- Cinematography: James Wong Howe
- Edited by: Leon Selditz
- Music by: Elmer Bernstein
- Production companies: Earlmar Productions; Hall Bartlett Productions
- Distributed by: United Artists
- Release date: January 1957
- Running time: 92 minutes
- Country: United States
- Language: English
- Budget: $1 million

Drango is a 1957 American Western film produced by Jeff Chandler's production company Earlmar Productions, written and directed by Hall Bartlett, and released by United Artists. Starring Chandler in the title role, the film also features Ronald Howard, Joanne Dru, Julie London and Donald Crisp. Set in the town of Kennesaw, Georgia in the months immediately following the American Civil War, the story depicts the efforts of a resolute Union Army officer who had participated in the town's destruction during Sherman's March determined to make amends.

== Plot ==
Union officers Major Drango and Captain Banning ride into Kennesaw Pass, Georgia, at the end of the Civil War; a town ravaged by the war, particularly during Sherman's March to the Sea, its citizens are still bitter about the lives and property lost. Drango is the new military governor, but townspeople including Judge Allen and his son Clay make it clear that these Yankees are not welcome.

A local man seen as disloyal to the Confederacy, set to be tried by Drango's demand for a recent killing, is lynched after the townspeople refuse to serve as jurors. The man's daughter, Kate Calder, blames Drango for letting it happen, while Judge Allen is distraught by how justice has utterly failed his town.

Drango attempts to bring the men responsible to justice, but wealthy citizen Shelby Ransom harbors the fugitives, including her lover Clay. A doctor and newspaper editor offer Drango their support in restoring order. Colonel Bracken from nearby Fort Dalton finds fault with Drango for not being tough enough, so he confiscates the town's food supply and rations it. Clay's men stage a raid. The doctor is wounded during Clay's raid, the newspaper office is set ablaze and the editor's young son is accidentally killed.

Despite the revelation to the townspeople that the root of Drango's presence in Kennesaw Pass is to atone for his part in Sherman's march, Drango's fairness and honesty in his command during the Union rationing over time has won him some more support within town, including Kate Calder. An angered Shelby tries to order Clay from her home, but he slaps her and makes her lure the absent Captain Banning to an ambush. Drango, away from town pleading his case to Colonel Bracken, returns to find Banning, killed in Clay's ambush, being laid to rest by several townspeople; the ambush an unfortunate success.

The judge confronts his son over his unlawful acts, as Clay now aims to lay siege to Fort Dalton, but Clay refuses to listen. In a desperate last stand to stop open revolt, Drango stands in the street, only to be shot and injured for his defiance. But Clay in turn is shot and killed by his own father (who earlier said he would rather see his own son killed in the street than wage war against the Union), restoring law and order to the town. Drango and several townspeople, ally and not, depart for Fort Dalton to end the rationing in a peaceful way.

== Cast ==
- Jeff Chandler as Major Clint Drango
- Joanne Dru as Kate Calder
- Julie London as Shelby Ransom
- Donald Crisp as Judge Allen
- Ronald Howard as Clay Allen
- John Lupton as Capt. Marc Banning
- Walter Sande as Dr. Blair
- Milburn Stone as Col. Bracken
- Morris Ankrum as Henry Calder
- Parley Baer as George Randolph, Daily Herold
- Damian O'Flynn as Gareth Blackford
- Barney Phillips as Rev. Giles Cameron
- Charles Horvath as Ragan
- Katherine Warren as Mrs. Scott
- Chubby Johnson as Zeb
- David Stollery as Jeb Bryant
- Edith Evanson as Mrs. Blackford
- Anthony Jochim as Stryker the School Teacher
- Amzie Strickland as Mrs. George Randolph
- Mimi Gibson as Ellen Bryant
- Helen Wallace as Mrs. Allen
- Paul Lukather as Burke
- Bing Russell as Lieutenant with Supply Wagon
- Chuck Webster as Boy with Chicken
- David Saber as Tommy Randolph
- Phil Chambers as Luke
- James Murphy as Bartender
- Rex Allen as Himself – Singer of Title Song (voice)

== Production ==
The film was made by Jeff Chandler's own production company, Earlmar, for United Artists. It was meant to be the first of a six-picture deal Earlmar had with United, with Chandler to star in three of them. The film was a co-production with the production company of Hal Bartlett, who wrote the script.

Chandler had risen to fame playing Cochise in Broken Arrow. "It's no Indian story", said Chandler, "let Cochise rest in peace."

Half the movie was shot on location in the south; filming started in St Francisville in June 1956.

Ronald Howard made his American debut in the film. Linda Darnell signed to play the female lead, with Donald Crisp and Julie London in support. Darnell had to pull out because of a virus and she was replaced with Joanne Dru.

== Follow Up ==
The second film Chandler was meant to make for United Artists was Lincoln McKeever, based on a novel by Eliezar Lipsky about a frontiersman appointed to the Supreme Court.

== See also ==
- List of American films of 1957
