= Undercover Maisie =

1947 film by Harry Beaumont

- Theatrical film poster
- Directed by: Harry Beaumont
- Written by: Thelma Robinson
- Produced by: George Haight
- Starring: Ann Sothern; Barry Nelson; Mark Daniels
- Cinematography: Charles Salerno Jr.
- Edited by: Ben Lewis
- Music by: David Snell
- Distributed by: Metro-Goldwyn-Mayer
- Release date: March 1, 1947
- Running time: 90 minutes
- Country: United States
- Language: English
- Budget: $805,000
- Box office: $1,024,000

Undercover Maisie is a 1947 American comedy film directed by Harry Beaumont and starring Ann Sothern, Barry Nelson, and Mark Daniels. It was produced by Metro-Goldwyn-Mayer, the final film of the ten film Maisie series starring Ann Sothern as ex-showgirl Maisie Ravier. In this series entry, Maisie Ravier decides to join the Los Angeles police force. The previous film was Up Goes Maisie.

== Plot ==
While moving to New York for work, Maisie Ravier loses her valuables to a confidence woman. When Maisie accurately and thoroughly describes the woman to the police, Lieutenant Paul Scott from the bunco squad is impressed at her observation skills. Paul convinces his boss, Captain Mead, to place Maisie in police training as he wants to use Maisie as an undercover agent to solve some of their unsolved frauds around the city.

Because of the distraction Maisie creates at the police academy, Paul gives her a private teacher, Chip Dolan. After training, Maisie is sent on her first mission: to catch a con artist called Willis Farnes, who poses as a psychic named "Amor". Maisie goes undercover as a wealthy woman who needs advice from a fortune teller on how to invest her vast fortune. Farnes fakes a trance, where he tells Maisie to jump on the very first investment offer she gets. After the session, Maisie "accidentally" runs into real estate broker Gilfred I. Rogers, who is really Farnes' accomplice. Maisie inadvertently reveals her true identity to Rogers. When Maisie returns to the station, she learns from Captain Mead that she has been had. Feeling like she has to redeem herself as a police officer, Maisie tries to figure out a way to find Rogers. Maisie finds some documents left behind by Rogers in her apartment, and among them is an invitation to an event that same night, which Farnes is hosting.

Maisie goes to the event to investigate on her own, and discovers that they are bilking several military families in a real estate scam. Farnes recognizes Maisie and has his goons, Mr. and Mrs. Guy Canford, kidnap her. Maisie gets a secret message out of the hideout regarding where she is. Before Paul and the police arrive at the hideout, Farnes and the Canfords have already left with Maisie for Long Beach. On the way there, the Canfords knock Farnes out, and decide to kill and dump Maisie by the side of the road. When Paul and the police arrive at the site where the Canfords planned to kill Maisie, they find that Maisie, using her police self-defense training, was able to subdue the Canfords. Paul embraces Maisie, stating that their marriage and honeymoon will be an interesting one.

== Cast ==
- Ann Sothern as Maisie Ravier
- Barry Nelson as Lt. Paul Scott
- Mark Daniels as Chip Dolan
- Leon Ames as Amor aka Willis Farnes
- Clinton Sundberg as Guy Canford
- Dick Simmons as Gilfred I. Rogers
- Charles D. Brown as Capt. Mead
- Gloria Holden as Mrs. Guy Canford
- Douglas Fowley as Daniels
- Nella Walker as Mrs. Andrew Lorrison
- Gene Roberts as Viola Trengham
- Celia Travers as Isabelle
- Morris Ankrum as Parker

== Reception ==
The film earned $779,000 in the U.S. and Canada, and $245,000 in other markets, resulting in a loss of $142,000.
