= Smuggler's Island =

1951 American Film noir adventure film by Edward Ludwig

- Film poster by Reynold Brown
- Directed by: Edward Ludwig
- Written by: Leonard Lee
- Based on: story and adaptation by Herbert Magolis; Louis Morheim
- Produced by: Ted Richmond
- Starring: Jeff Chandler; Evelyn Keyes
- Cinematography: Maury Gertsman
- Edited by: Ted J. Kent
- Production company: Universal Pictures
- Distributed by: Universal Pictures
- Release dates: May 18, 1951 (Los Angeles); May 23, 1951 (New York City)
- Running time: 75 minutes
- Country: United States
- Language: English
- Box office: $1,050,000

Smuggler's Island is a 1951 American Technicolor adventure film noir directed by Edward Ludwig and starring Jeff Chandler and Evelyn Keyes.

== Plot ==
Steve Kent's boat is repossessed in Macao, leaving him without a way to make his living as a deep-sea diver. At a casino, he is introduced to wealthy and beautiful Vivian Craig, who at first seems interested in Steve romantically, but she seeks his diving expertise.

Agreeing to search for medical supplies lost in a plane crash, Steve dives underwater and locates them. Vivian accompanies him, and when one of the crates breaks open, Steve sees it that it contains a shipment of stolen gold.

At first, Steve intends to present Vivian to the authorities, but his attraction to her prevents him from doing so. Her husband Allan Craig, appears, pursuing the gold. He offers Vivian and Steve a three-way split to retrieve the bullion, but after he double-crosses them, the boat explodes.

== Cast ==
- Jeff Chandler as Steve Kent
- Evelyn Keyes as Vivian Craig
- Philip Friend as Allan Craig
- Marvin Miller as Bok-Ying
- Ducky Louie as Kai Lun
- David Bauer as Lorca (as David Wolfe)
- Jay Novello as Espinosa
- H. T. Tsiang as Chang

== Production ==
The original cast announced for the film was Märta Torén, Dick Powell and Robert Douglas. The production was the first of a nine-film contract that Evelyn Keyes had signed with Universal Pictures.
