= Philip Friend =

British actor (1915–1987)

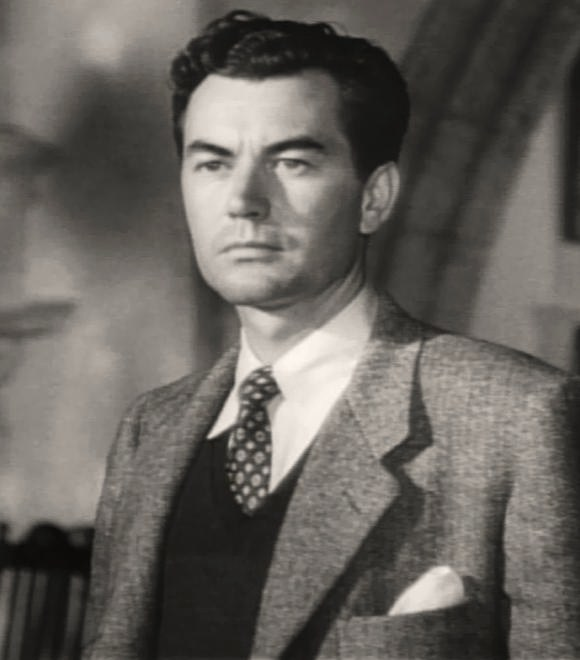
Philip Friend in Thunder on the Hill (1951) trailer

Philip Wyndham Friend (20 February 1915 in Horsham, Sussex – 1 September 1987 in Chiddingfold, Surrey) was a British film and television actor.

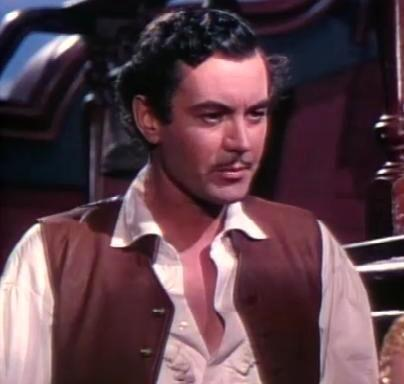
Philip Friend in Buccaneer's Girl (1950) trailer

== Career ==
=== Britain ===
Friend went to Bradfield College where he became interested in acting. He began appearing in musical comedies in 1935, and was soon working on the West End. He was in a production of French Without Tears that was on Broadway. He returned to London and was busy on the stage until war broke out after which he joined the Royal Fusiliers.

Friend had small roles in British films like Inquest (1939), The Midas Touch (1940), and Old Bill and Son (1941).

He was in Dangerous Moonlight (1941), 'Pimpernel' Smith (1941), Sheepdog of the Hills (1941), Back-Room Boy (1942), The Day Will Dawn (1942), The Next of Kin (1942), In Which We Serve (1942), The Young Mr. Pitt (1942), and We Dive at Dawn (1943).

Friend had bigger parts in The Bells Go Down (1943) with Tommy Trinder, Warn That Man (1943) with Gordon Harker and The Flemish Farm (1943), and could be seen in Two Thousand Women (1944). He had a decent sized role in Great Day (1945).

Friend returned to the stage with Pink String and Sealing Wax and The First Gentleman.

=== Hollywood ===
In February 1946 Friend signed a contract with David O. Selznick who brought the actor to Hollywood. Selznick wound up not using Friend in any of his films.

Friend had a support part in My Own True Love (1948) with Phyllis Calvert. He could also be seen in Enchantment (1948).

Friend was a British soldier in Sword in the Desert (1949) at Universal. They liked his work and signed him to a contract, casting him in the lead of Buccaneer's Girl (1950) with Yvonne de Carlo. Friend was kept at Universal for Spy Hunt (1950), then the studio dropped him. They hired him back to play the villain in Smuggler's Island (1951). He was in Thunder on the Hill (1951).

Friend had the star role in The Highwayman (1952) for Monogram Pictures.

Friend began appearing on TV in such shows as The Philco-Goodyear Television Playhouse and Kraft Theatre. On Broadway he was meant to join the cast of Faithfully Yours but Equity objected. Instead he starred in Jane in 1952.

=== Return to Britain ===
Friend returned home to be in Desperate Moment (1953). He had support roles in Background (1952), The Diamond (1954), Dick Turpin: Highwayman (1956), Cloak Without Dagger (1956) and The Betrayal (1956). He also appeared regularly on British TV shows such as The Errol Flynn Theatre.

Friend's later work included Son of Robin Hood (1958), The Solitary Child (1958), Web of Suspicion (1959), The Fur Collar (1962), Stranglehold (1962), and The Vulture (1966).

One of his last appearances was in the TV movie Suez 1956 (1979).

== Personal life ==
Friend was married to the actress Eileen Erskine, and they had two sons.

== Partial filmography ==
- Inquest (1939)
- The Midas Touch (1940)
- "Pimpernel" Smith (1941)
- The Day Will Dawn (1942)
- The Next of Kin (1942)
- In Which We Serve (1942)
- The Bells Go Down (1943)
- Warn That Man (1943)
- Enchantment (1948)
- Sword in the Desert (1949)
- Buccaneer's Girl (1950)
- Spy Hunt (1950)
- Smuggler's Island (1951)
- Desperate Moment (1953)
- Background (1953)
- The Diamond (1954)
- Cloak Without Dagger (1956)
- The Betrayal (1957)
- The Son of Robin Hood (1958)
- The Solitary Child (1958)
- Web of Suspicion (1959)
- Danger List (1959)
- The Fur Collar (1962)
- Stranglehold (1963)
