= Sirocco (1951 film) =

1951 film by Curtis Bernhardt

- Theatrical release poster
- Directed by: Curtis Bernhardt
- Screenplay by: A.I. Bezzerides; Hans Jacoby
- Based on: Le coup de grâce 1936 novel by Joseph Kessel
- Produced by: Robert Lord
- Starring: Humphrey Bogart; Märta Torén; Lee J. Cobb; Zero Mostel
- Cinematography: Burnett Guffey
- Edited by: Viola Lawrence
- Music by: George Antheil
- Production company: Santana Pictures Corporation
- Distributed by: Columbia Pictures
- Release dates: June 13, 1951 (New York); July 25, 1951 (Los Angeles)
- Running time: 98 minutes
- Country: United States
- Language: English
- Box office: $1.3 million (U.S. rentals)

Sirocco is a 1951 American thriller film noir directed by Curtis Bernhardt and starring Humphrey Bogart, Märta Torén and Lee J. Cobb. The screenplay is based on the novel Le coup de grâce by French author Joseph Kessel.

== Plot ==
In 1925 Damascus, the native Syrians are fighting a guerrilla war against the French colonial rule of Syria. Harry Smith is an American black marketeer secretly selling weapons to the guerrillas. As the situation deteriorates, French general LaSalle orders the execution of civilian sympathizers each time that his soldiers are killed, but his head of military intelligence Colonel Feroud persuades him to simply detain civilians for 48 hours. Feroud summons five of the city's profiteers (including Smith and Balukjiaan) and accuses them of selling food at excessive prices. Smith is the only one who appears to be willing to cooperate. After he leaves, they investigate Smith and find that he was a World War I hero.

A guerilla-planted bomb explodes in a nightclub where Smith has been eying Violetta while drinking with his barber friend Nasir. Violetta is thrown to the floor, Feroud lifts her up and Smith comforts her. Violetta leaves with Feroud and returns to his apartment, as they are lovers.

Feroud demands to negotiate with rebel leader Emir Hassan. LaSalle reluctantly allows him to try to arrange a meeting but refuses to permit Feroud to initiate direct contact. A young military officer sent in his place is later found with his throat cut. Feroud summons Balukjiaan and accuses him of being a gunrunner. He protests his innocence and suggests Smith instead.

Harry makes a romantic advance toward Violetta, but she rejects him. Later, she informs Feroud that she wants to leave him, but he hits her and refuses to free her.

Harry discovers that Nasir has been pressured to provide his name to the authorities, and he plans his escape. At the same time, Violetta appears and begs him to return her to Cairo. Needing to flee himself, he allows her to accompany him. However, a French patrol nearly captures Harry. He narrowly escapes but has to leave his money, and without it, he is betrayed to the French.

Facing execution, Harry agrees to help Feroud meet with Hassan, who calls the colonel a fool and dismisses his plea for negotiations, he spares his life when Harry and Feroud's aide Major Leon offers a £10,000 ransom. The officers are allowed to leave, but Harry is not. The rebels are angered that he has revealed the location of their headquarters to the French and fear that he has betrayed them, so they kill him. As Feroud and Leon walk back, they notice that the incessant gunfire and explosions have stopped.

== Cast ==
- Humphrey Bogart as Harry Smith
- Märta Torén as Violetta
- Lee J. Cobb as Colonel Feroud
- Everett Sloane as General LaSalle
- Gerald Mohr as Major Leon
- Zero Mostel as Balukjiaan
- Nick Dennis as Nasir Aboud
- Onslow Stevens as Emir Hassan
- Ludwig Donath as Flophouse Proprietor
- David Bond as Achmet
- Harry Guardino as Lieutenant Collet
- Leonard Penn as Rifat
- Edward Colmans as Colonel Corville
- Jay Novello as Hamal
- Peter Ortiz as Maj. Robbinet
- Jeff Corey as Feisal
- Harry Cording as Master Sergeant
- Ric Roman as Orderly
- Peter Mamakos as Merchant Businessman
- Dan Seymour as Wealthy Syrian
- Argentina Brunetti as Woman
- Carmen D'Antonio as Dancer

== Reception ==
In a contemporary review for The New York Times, critic Bosley Crowther wrote: "Except for a few moody moments in a plaster night-club, called the Moulin Rouge, and some shadowy shots of sloppy Syrians lying around in dingy catacombs, the scene is no more suggestive of Damascus than a Shriners' convention in New Orleans, on which occasion you would see more fezzes than ever show up in this film. For the most part—indeed, for the sole part—'Sirocco' wafts a torpid tale of a slick, sneering gun-runner proving a painful thorn in a nice French colonel's side."

Critic Edwin Schallert of the Los Angeles Times wrote: "'Sirocco' takes Humphrey Bogart to the intrigue-ridden Middle East of the mid-1920s and there develops a plot that sullenly and somberly attempts to avoid cliches, even though it continually overhangs the brink of dullness. ... [T]he film is almost perpetually low-keyed both in dramatic action and photography. It is distinguished, both its advantage and disadvantage, by its atmosphere and slow-paced performances."
