= Iron Man (1951 film) =

1951 film

- Film poster by Reynold Brown
- Directed by: Joseph Pevney
- Screenplay by: Borden Chase; George Zuckerman
- Based on: Novel by W. R. Burnett
- Produced by: Aaron Rosenberg
- Starring: Jeff Chandler; Evelyn Keyes; Stephen McNally
- Cinematography: Carl E. Guthrie
- Edited by: Russell F. Schoengarth
- Color process: Black and white
- Production company: Universal Pictures
- Distributed by: Universal Pictures
- Release date: August 18, 1951 (New York)
- Running time: 82 minutes
- Country: United States
- Language: English
- Box office: $1 million (U.S. rentals)

Iron Man is a 1951 American sports drama film noir directed by Joseph Pevney and starring Jeff Chandler, Evelyn Keyes and Stephen McNally, with an early appearance by Rock Hudson as a boxer. The film is a remake of a 1931 film of the same title directed by Tod Browning.

== Plot ==
Coal miner Coke Mason is encouraged by his gambler brother to become a boxer. However, Coke is consumed by a murderous rage whenever he enters the ring.

== Cast ==
- Jeff Chandler as Coke Mason
- Evelyn Keyes as Rose Warren Mason
- Stephen McNally as George Mason
- Rock Hudson as Tommy "Speed" O'Keefe
- Joyce Holden as "Tiny" Ford
- Jim Backus as Max Watkins
- James Arness as Alex Mallick
- Steve Martin as Joe Savella

== Background ==
Jeff Chandler trained as a boxer to play the role. He said: "It's my chance to step right up there in a class with Kirk Douglas and Bob Ryan. And that's pretty fast company."

Filming began on January 3, 1951.

== Release ==
To promote the film, Jeff Chandler fought two rounds with Jersey Joe Walcott at the Polo Grounds in New York before 25,000 spectators.

== Reception ==
In a contemporary review for The New York Times, critic A. H. Weiler wrote:

Action in what our sports-writing colleagues like to refer to anomalously as the "squared circle" has been a staple stock in trade for Hollywood. And "Iron Man" ... is not lacking in the blood, sweat and a suspicion of drama inherent in prize ring pictures. But this story of a fighter, scared and defeated by his own killer instinct, is merely standard for the course. The cast, director and scenarist are professional and take their assignments seriously, but they are not creating a champion in their class. ... Jeff Chandler, who has the physique of a heavyweight contender and the ability to square away against the cameras, is hampered a bit, it would appear, by some of his lines. He is designed as a tough customer, but he is made to expound like an intellectual fairly often. It's confusing.

== See also ==
- List of American films of 1951
- List of boxing films
