= Thelma Robinson =

American film and television writer (1913–1965)

- Born: Thelma Merle Snider; May 9, 1913; Keokuk, Iowa, U.S.
- Died: May 2, 1965 (aged 51); Los Angeles, California, U.S.
- Occupation(s): Screenwriter, television writer
- Years active: 1946–1960
- Spouse: George Haight (1950–1965; her death)

Thelma Robinson (May 9, 1913 – May 2, 1965) was an American film and television writer active from the 1940s through the 1960s. Her credits include films like Up Goes Maisie and Undercover Maisie.

== Biography ==
Thelma Merle Snider was born in Keokuk, Iowa, to Willis Snider and Sylvia Wilcox. She was raised by her mother and her stepfather, Hamilton Robinson, whose last name she took on. She spent much of her childhood in Huntington Beach, California.

Robinson began working on screenplays in Hollywood by the mid-1940s; her first credit was on 1946's Up Goes Maisie, directed by Harry Beaumont. She also wrote the follow-up film, Undercover Maisie, and later contributed to 1952's Because of You.

In the 1950s, after marrying writer-producer George Haight (with whom she had collaborated previously), she concentrated on television, writing episodes of shows like Lassie, National Velvet, and Fireside Theatre.

Robinson died in Los Angeles on May 2, 1965, at the age of 51.

== Selected works ==
For television:

- National Velvet (1 episode, 1960)
- Lux Video Theatre (1 episode, 1956)
- Lassie (4 episodes, 1955–1956)
- Fireside Theatre (1 episode, 1955)
- Four Star Theatre (2 episodes, 1954)

For film:

- Because of You (1952)
- Undercover Maisie (1947)
- Up Goes Maisie (1946)
