= Maddalena (1954 film) =

1953 film directed by Augusto Genina

- Film poster
- Directed by: Augusto Genina
- Written by: Carlo Alianello; Pierre Bost; Madeleine Masson de Belavalle; Alessandro De Stefani; Augusto Genina; Giorgio Prosperi
- Produced by: Giuseppe Bordogni
- Starring: Märta Torén; Gino Cervi; Charles Vanel
- Cinematography: Claude Renoir
- Edited by: Giancarlo Cappelli
- Music by: Antonio Veretti
- Production companies: Titanus; Société Nouvelle Pathé Cinéma
- Distributed by: Titanus
- Release date: 16 March 1954
- Running time: 102 minutes
- Countries: France; Italy
- Language: Italian

Maddalena is a 1954 French-Italian melodrama film directed by Augusto Genina and starring Märta Torén, Gino Cervi and Charles Vanel. It was entered into the 1954 Cannes Film Festival. It was shot in Technicolor. The film's sets were designed by the art director Ottavio Scotti.

== Plot ==
Every year, on Good Friday, a procession takes place in a small provincial village. This year the women of the village are unable to choose a girl who can play the Madonna. A local squire, with the intention of publicly mocking the curate Don Vincenzo, ensures that a young prostitute, Maddalena, receives this assignment.

Magdalene accepts because she wants to take revenge with the Virgin for the loss of her daughter, who died in boarding school during her first communion, due to a trivial fire of the veil. The women of the village do not accept that a foreigner interprets the Madonna, but the curate defends her choice, even though he does not know who Magdalene really is.

During a rehearsal of the procession, Magdalene faints and is invited by the priest to rest. But, passing by the church, he meets a woman in prayer who sees her and, believing that Magdalene is an apparition of the Madonna, invokes her to have her son healed from a serious illness.

Magdalene tries to escape, but she is credited with healing the boy and she stays for the Good Friday procession. The squire, however, takes revenge by telling everyone who the girl really is. Faced with this confession, people attack Maddalena and start stoning her.

== Cast ==
- Märta Torén as Maddalena
- Gino Cervi as Don Vincenzo
- Charles Vanel as Giovanni Lamberti
- Jacques Sernas as Giovanni Belloni
- Folco Lulli as The Herdsman
- Patrizia De Filippo as Maddalena's Daughter
- Angiola Faranda as The Herdsman's Daughter
- Valentine Tessier as Geltrude
- Isa Querio as Luisa
- Bianca Doria as Rosa
- Germana Paolieri as Prostitute
- Liliana Gerace as The Other Prostitute
- Natale Cirino as The Barman
