= The Shadow (1954 film) =

- Directed by: Giorgio Bianchi
- Written by: Fede Arnaud; Giorgio Bianchi
- Story by: Dario Niccodemi
- Starring: Märta Torén
- Cinematography: Tonino Delli Colli
- Music by: Carlo Rustichelli
- Release date: 26 December 1954
- Language: Italian

The Shadow (Italian: L'ombra) is a 1954 Italian melodrama film directed by Giorgio Bianchi and starring Märta Torén and Pierre Cressoy.

== Plot ==
A young painter's wife falls ill and becomes bedridden. He is comforted by a female friend, and they fall in love and have a child. But his wife recovers.

== Cast ==
- Märta Torén as Alberta
- Pierre Cressoy as Gerardo
- Gianna Maria Canale as Elena
- Filippo Scelzo as Dr. Magre
- Paolo Stoppa as Michele
- Emma Baron as Luisa
- Renato Navarrini
