= Jeff Chandler =

American actor (1918–1961)

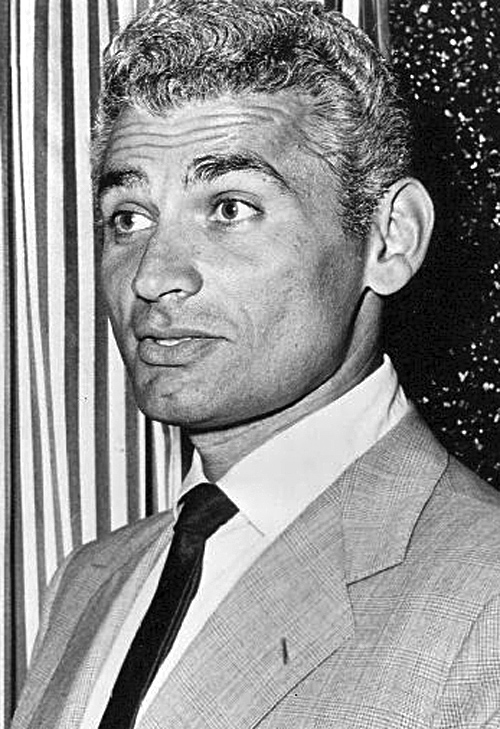
- Chandler in 1958
- Born: Ira Grossel; December 15, 1918; New York City, U.S.
- Died: June 17, 1961 (aged 42); Culver City, California, U.S.
- Resting place: Hillside Memorial Park Cemetery
- Occupations: Actor, producer, singer
- Years active: 1945–1961
- Spouse: Marjorie Hoshelle (m. 1946; div. 1959)
- Children: 2

Jeff Chandler (born Ira Grossel; December 15, 1918 – June 17, 1961) was an American actor. He was best known for his portrayal of Cochise in Broken Arrow (1950), for which he was nominated for the Academy Award for Best Supporting Actor. He was one of Universal Pictures' more popular male stars of the 1950s. His other credits include Sword in the Desert (1948), Deported (1950), Female on the Beach (1955), and Away All Boats (1956). He also performed as a radio actor and as a singer.

== Early life ==
Chandler was born Ira Grossel in Brooklyn, New York City, the only child of Jewish parents Anna (née Herman) and Phillip Grossel. He was raised by his mother after his parents separated when he was a child.

He attended Erasmus Hall High School, where he acted in school plays; his schoolmates included Susan Hayward. Chandler's father was connected with the restaurant business and got his son a job as a restaurant cashier. Chandler said he always wanted to act, but courses for commercial art were cheaper, so he studied art for a year and worked as a layout artist for a mail-order catalogue at $18 a week.

Eventually, he saved up enough money to take a drama course at the Feagin School of Dramatic Art in New York. He worked briefly in radio, then got a job in a stock company on Long Island as an actor and stage manager. He worked for two years in stock companies, including a performance of The Trojan Horse opposite famous singers and actors Gordon MacRae and his wife Sheila MacRae, who became his good friends.

Chandler formed his own company, the Shady Lane Playhouse, in Illinois in the summer of 1941. The company toured the Midwest with some success, presenting such plays as The Bad Man, Seventh Heaven, The New Minister, and Pigs. When America entered World War II, Chandler enlisted in the army. He served for four years, mostly in the Aleutians, finishing with the rank of lieutenant.

== Career ==
=== Radio ===
After being discharged from the army, Chandler moved to Los Angeles in December 1945 with $3,000 he had saved. Shortly after his arrival, he was involved in a serious car accident on the way to a screen test, which resulted in a large scar on his forehead.

Chandler initially struggled to find work in Hollywood, and had spent all his savings when he got his first job as a radio actor in May 1946. He went on to appear in episodes of anthology drama series such as Escape and Academy Award Theater, and became well known for playing the lead in Michael Shayne. Chandler was the first actor to portray Chad Remington in Frontier Town.

=== Early film roles ===
Chandler had appeared on air in Rogue's Gallery with Dick Powell, who was impressed by the actor, and put pressure on Columbia to give Chandler his first film role, a small part as a gangster in Johnny O'Clock (1947). He tested for Columbia's The Loves of Carmen but did not get the part. He went on to play small roles as gangsters in Roses are Red and The Invisible Wall, and a policeman in Mr Belvedere Goes to College. Chandler received more attention playing Eve Arden's love interest on radio in Our Miss Brooks, which debuted in July 1948 and became a massive hit.

His performance in Our Miss Brooks brought him to the attention of executives at Universal, who were looking for someone to play an Israeli leader in Sword in the Desert (1949). He was cast in February 1949. Chandler impressed studio executives so much with his work that shortly into filming, Universal signed him to a seven-year contract. His first film under the arrangement was a supporting role in Abandoned (1949).

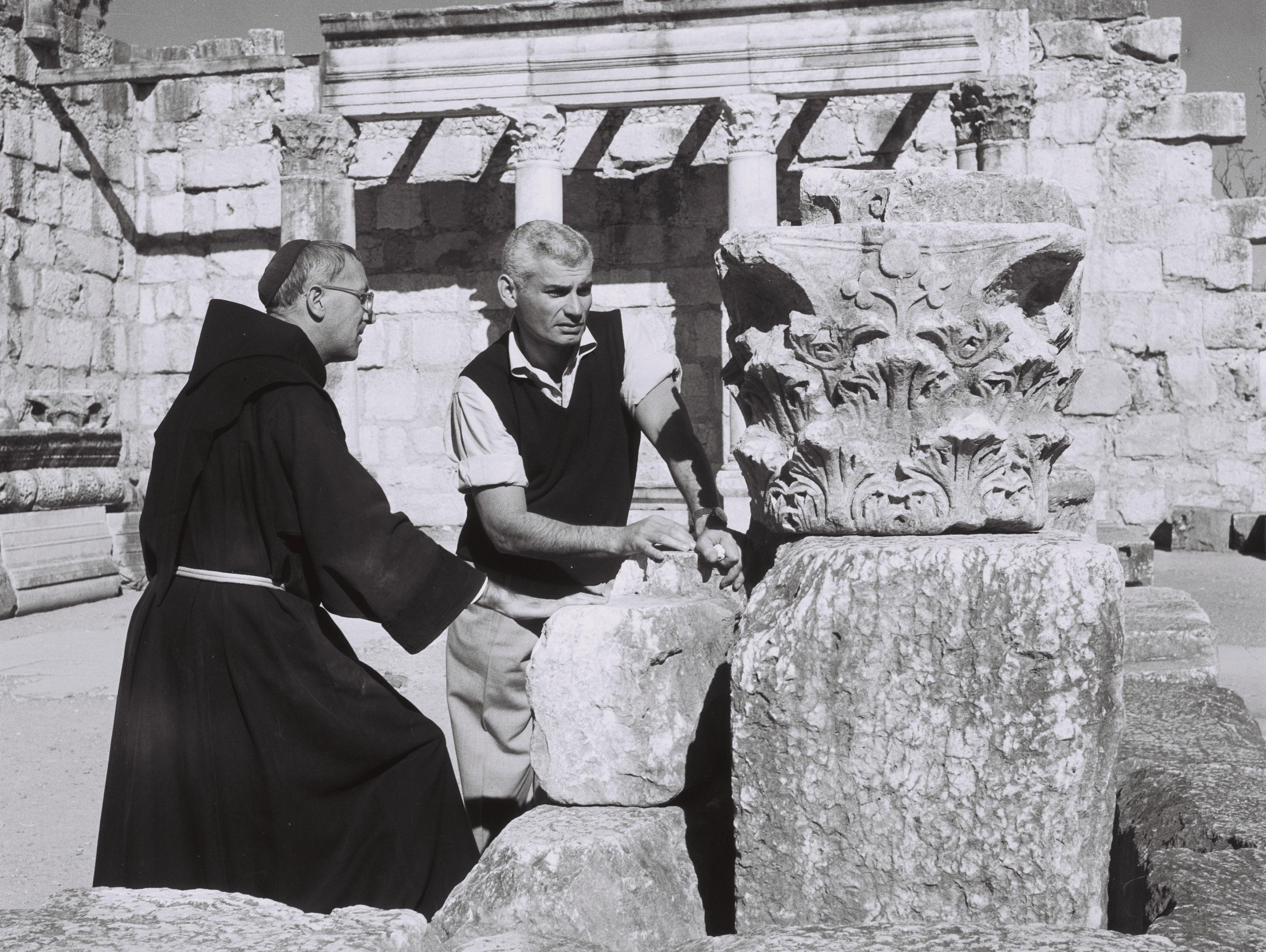
Jeff Chandler at Capernaum during a visit to Israel in 1959

=== Broken Arrow and stardom ===
In February 1953, I was making a second picture with Jeff Chandler, one called War Arrow. Jeff was a real sweetheart, but acting with him was like acting with a broomstick

— Maureen O'Hara on acting with Chandler in War Arrow (2004)

Writer-director Delmer Daves was looking for an actor to play Cochise in Broken Arrow (1950) at 20th Century Fox. The part was proving tricky to cast; in Chandler's words, "Fox was looking for a guy big enough physically to play the role and unfamiliar enough to moviegoers to lend authenticity." Chandler's performance as a similar resistance leader-type in Sword of the Desert brought him to the studio's attention, and he was borrowed from Universal for the role in May 1949. As part of the arrangement, Chandler signed a deal with Fox to make a film a year with them for six years. He also had to be written out of his radio shows Michael Shayne and Our Miss Brooks for several weeks.

Broken Arrow turned out to be a considerable hit, earning Chandler an Oscar nomination and establishing him as a star. He was the first actor nominated for an Academy Award for portraying an American Indian.

Even before Broken Arrow was released, Chandler was upped to leading-man status back at Universal. He was meant to make Death on a Sidestreet and The Lady Count but neither ended up being made. Instead, he took over a role originally meant for Dana Andrews, a Lucky Luciano-style gangster in Deported, for producer Robert Buckner, who cast him in Sword in the Desert. "I don't know why I got it," Chandler joked at the time, "maybe it's because I'm saving them money." The movie was shot on location in Italy, although Chandler's radio commitments meant some of it had to be filmed in Hollywood.

He went back to Fox for his second film for them, as an embittered Union cavalryman in Two Flags West for director Robert Wise. Chandler replaced Lee J. Cobb, and it was one of his least-typical roles, a character part rather than a leading man. Once again, location work required him to regularly commute back and forth to Hollywood throughout the shoot.

Returning to Universal, Chandler played an adventurer in Smuggler's Island, a role he liked because he said it was close to his real personality. Hollywood tended to cast him, though, in different nationalities. According to one profile, "he has unusual face, with taut, bony features, which seem to fit neatly into any sort of role".

He was reunited with Fox and Delmer Daves to play a Polynesian chief in Bird of Paradise (1951), which Chandler admitted was a variation of his performance as Cochise. It was the last film he made outside Universal for a number of years.

Back at Universal, he played a boxer in Iron Man (1951), a remake of an old Lew Ayres movie. He was announced for another film with Buckner, The Wild Bunch, which was not made; instead, he played an Arab chief in Flame of Araby (1951), opposite Maureen O'Hara.

Around this time, Chandler expressed his dissatisfaction with acting in film as opposed to radio:

[Radio actors] have to make their roles come alive, and they only have their voices with which to do it, but in pictures, the technique is quite different. The actor is only a small part of the performance. He lends his intelligence and personality to the role, but the greatest part of the performance belongs to the producer, who puts him in a certain type of part; the director, who tells him how to play it; and the cutter, who edits what's done. That's why I find being a movie actor not particularly gratifying. I want to eventually branch off into writing and directing.

Chandler reprised his role as Cochise in another Western, The Battle at Apache Pass, for Universal. He then went on to make a war film, Red Ball Express, and a swashbuckler, Yankee Buccaneer. He made a cameo in Meet Danny Wilson and had a change of pace when he supported Loretta Young in Because of You – which a few years later he called his favorite role. Young later said Chandler "was more of a personality than an actor... a charming man."

In 1952, exhibitors voted Chandler the 22nd-most popular star in the US. 20th Century-Fox was keen to use Chandler again and offered him roles in The Day the Earth Stood Still, Lydia Bailey, Les Misérables, and The Secret of Convict Lake. Universal refused to lend him, though, as he was now one of their biggest stars.

Our Miss Brooks transferred to television, but Chandler was not permitted to do TV under his contract; his part was taken by Robert Rockwell. On Peggy Lee's radio show, he had demonstrated a talent for singing, and he pursued this through the decade.

=== New contract ===
In July 1952, Chandler signed a fresh contract with Universal that doubled his salary. His first movie under this was a Western, The Great Sioux Uprising. It was followed by more adventure fare: East of Sumatra and War Arrow with Maureen O'Hara.

This meant Chandler missed the part of Demetrius in The Robe (1953) at Fox, for which he had been considered and which eventually went to Victor Mature. He also missed out on the lead in the remake of Magnificent Obsession, for which he had been mooted; the part was taken by Rock Hudson, who had supported Chandler in Iron Man. Both The Robe and Magnificent Obsession became big hits. Chandler played Cochise for the third time, a cameo in Taza, Son of Cochise, starring Hudson, who soon overtook Chandler as Universal's biggest male star.

Universal announced him for Chief Crazy Horse, but the role ended up being played by Victor Mature. Instead, he appeared in Yankee Pasha, and started singing in nightclubs. He left the radio show Our Miss Brooks after five years "to get a rest," he said, "Although it didn't take long to do the show, it tied up all my Sundays."

Chandler appeared in an expensive (for Universal) epic, playing the Emperor Marcian in Sign of the Pagan and co-starred with Jane Russell in Foxfire (1955), which he enjoyed because, "I don't have to be so darned monosyllabic in this one." He then made Female on the Beach with Joan Crawford and began releasing records.

=== Conflicts with Universal ===
In 1954, Chandler was starting to recognize how heavy his workload was:

You just can't call your time your own. When you're trekking the country – as I am now for my Decca records "I Should Care" and "More Than Anyone" and for Universal International, my home studio – every hour of the day, from the morning disc jockeys to the midnight program is filled. And in Hollywood, if you're not working on a picture or getting ready for one, you have to keep studying. I make a point of answering all my mail, and when anyone asks me for an autograph, I'm not just flattered. I see that as the least I can do for the people who have given me the fruits of this world.

In May, Chandler refused to play the lead in Six Bridges to Cross and Universal put him on suspension. He was replaced in the role by George Nader. Chandler spoke of making Young Moses and a Western with friends Tony Curtis and Janet Leigh, but neither film was made. He said that "being a movie star isn't worth it":

I can't go anywhere as an ordinary individual. There was a time I could walk around Times Square in New York (my home town) and look into shop windows or go into a cafe and eat in peace. But no more. I can't go anywhere unnoticed. Movie fans seem to think that actors belong to them, but we like to feel we belong to ourselves. Don't get me wrong – I wanted fame and money when I decided to take up acting. I like being recognized – it's flattering. But there's always one character who spoils anything... I walk into a restaurant and get a ringside table- but you remember I also have to leave the biggest tip. If I don't, I'm labeled the tightest guy in town. And let's face it, acting is the easiest way I know to make a buck. But I think I'm a fairly bright boy – I figure I could have made as much in some other business... Anyone in the world with imagination and initiative can become a success. Me? I like to push buttons. I was born to be an executive – an idea man. An executive is a guy who thinks things up and has other people execute them. I'd quit work immediately if I had the money, and travel for a while. I'd like to do some writing. I marked two radio scripts and have finished synopses and five movie stories.

Chandler made up with Universal, which cast him in Lady Godiva of Coventry. Chandler refused the role and was replaced again by George Nader, but this time, the dispute was not over money, but due to Chandler's overwork.

Universal cast Chandler in an expensive remake of The Spoilers, then was given the lead in one of the studio's most prestigious films of the year, Away All Boats.

In May, Chandler performed at the Riviera Hotel in Las Vegas. The Los Angeles Times wrote that Chandler "is proving remarkable in performing singing duty, even though he is not exactly a singing type".

He made a Western, Pillars of the Sky, then had a change of pace with the comedy The Toy Tiger, the fourth movie he made that year. Louella Parsons called Chandler "the busiest actor in town... Jeff is so happy in his private life these days that he's doing everything the studio wants."

Towards the end of the year, Chandler formed his own production company, Earlmar, with his agent Meyer Mishkin. This was to take effect from August 1956 onwards, when Chandler's exclusive contract with Universal expired. However, Chandler intended to continue to make films for Universal under a multipicture contract. He was voted the seventh-most popular star with British cinema goers.

=== Producer and new contract with Universal ===
In 1956, Universal gave Chandler a leave of absence from his contract with them "for a period of several months" to enable him to make his own movie for Earlmar. In exchange for this, Chandler was to make two more films for Universal under his original contract with them, then enter into a new arrangement under which he would appear in two films a year over three years.

Earlmar signed a six-picture deal with United Artists, under which Chandler was to appear in at least three of the films. He acted in and produced the first Earlmar production, a Western, Drango. "It's no Indian story," said Chandler, "let Cochise rest in peace." Chandler bought the rights to a novel, Lincoln McEever, but it was never made; Drango turned out to be Earlmar's sole production.

After Drango, Chandler made the final two films owed under his original contract with Universal: The Tattered Dress, playing a lawyer in a melodrama, and Man in the Shadow, co-starring opposite Orson Welles. He had commitments to make two films per year at Universal until 1959.

=== Freelance star ===
Chandler moved to Columbia Pictures and acted with Kim Novak in Jeanne Eagels.

He followed this with two films for Universal, The Lady Takes a Flyer with Lana Turner, and Raw Wind in Eden with Esther Williams. A Motion Picture Exhibitor Poll listed him as the tenth-most popular male star in the US in 1957.

Chandler made another for Universal, A Stranger in My Arms with June Allyson. He was to star opposite Tony Curtis in Operation Petticoat (1959), but fell ill and had to withdraw.

Chandler's next two movies were made for a brand new company, Seven Arts: Ten Seconds to Hell, a drama with Jack Palance for director Robert Aldrich, and Thunder in the Sun, a Western with Susan Hayward.

The last of those was distributed by Paramount, which released Chandler's next film, another Western, The Jayhawkers! In Ten Seconds to Hell and The Jayhawkers! Chandler played villains. He later reflected "I've tried heavies – but audiences didn't seem to take to that."

Chandler formed another production company, August, for which he made The Plunderers, a Western, distributed by Allied Artists. Allied was so pleased with the film, they requested three more movies from August, but Chandler never got to make them.

His next film, A Story of David, was filmed for American TV, his first work in that medium, but was shown theatrically in other countries. It was shot in London and Israel. Chandler stated:

I don't want to make pictures in other countries; I want to stay home. But suddenly there are not enough pictures being made here. All other countries are giving inducements to companies and to players; even a little country like Israel is trying to formulate a plan for subsidies. Our government still taxes the hell out of people; somebody ought to wake 'em up.

Chandler appeared in Return to Peyton Place for Fox. He then went over to Warner Bros. to make Merrill's Marauders, which was his last film.

== Personal life ==
Chandler married actress Marjorie Hoshelle in 1946. The couple had two daughters, Jamie Tucker (born 1947) and Dana Grossel (born 1949). They separated in 1951, again in 1954, and filed for divorce in 1954. His wife complained that Chandler was "chronically fatigued so that he would fall asleep wherever we were." They reconciled in March 1955.

In 1957, he had an affair with Esther Williams while they made a movie together, and his wife filed for divorce at the end of the year.

In his 1958 divorce proceedings, Chandler was revealed to be paying his wife an allowance of $1,500 per month. He said he was under contract to Universal to make two films a year at $60,000 per film for 1957 and $75,000 per film for 1958. He said he earned $250,000 in 1957 from his acting and singing, but had a lot of expenses, with his personal manager, business manager, and agent taking 25% of his income. The court ordered Chandler to continue paying $1,500 per month. Their divorce was granted in June 1959, with Chandler giving his wife $100,000 and over $2,166 per month in alimony plus $500 per month in child support. "He became so absorbed by his career that he spent all time when not actually working on a picture in his business office", said his wife. "I developed an ulcer."

Chandler was involved in a will dispute concerning his stepfather in 1960.

Chandler was a cousin of actor David Roya, who played the young villain Bernard Posner in Billy Jack.

When his friend Sammy Davis Jr. lost an eye in an accident and was in danger of losing the other, Chandler offered to give Davis one of his own eyes. Chandler had nearly lost an eye and had been visibly scarred in an auto accident years earlier.

Chandler had a relationship with Gloria DeHaven that was exposed in Confidential magazine. At a trial, Fred Otash said the detectives had followed them to get the story.

Esther Williams wrote in her 1999 autobiography that she broke off their relationship after he proposed because Chandler revealed he was a cross dresser. According to the Los Angeles Times, many friends and colleagues of Chandler rejected her claims. Jane Russell commented, "I've never heard of such a thing. Cross-dressing is the last thing I would expect of Jeff. He was a sweet guy, definitely all man."

He was also linked with Ann Sheridan.

Chandler's public support for Israel's 1956 attack on Egypt during the Suez Crisis prompted the United Arab Republic to campaign for his films to be banned in Arab countries in 1960. Chandler was an active Democrat.

He represented the Screen Actors Guild during talks throughout the 1960 actors' strike.

== Death ==
While working on Merrill's Marauders in the Philippines, on April 15, 1961, Chandler injured his back playing baseball with U.S. Army Special Forces soldiers who served as extras in the film. He had injections to deaden the pain and enable him to finish the production.

On May 13, 1961, he entered a hospital in Culver City, California, and had surgery for a spinal disc herniation. Severe complications arose; an artery was damaged, and Chandler hemorrhaged. On May 17, in a seven-and-a-half-hour emergency operation following the original surgery, he was given 55 US pints (26 L; 46 imp pt) of blood. A third operation followed on May 27, in which he received an additional 20 US pints (9.5 L; 17 imp pt) of blood. He died on June 17, 1961. The cause was a blood infection complicated by pneumonia.

At the time of his death, Chandler was involved with British actress Barbara Shelley. Tony Curtis and Gerald Mohr were among the pallbearers at Chandler's funeral, attended by more than 1,500 people. He was buried at Hillside Memorial Park Cemetery in Culver City.

An investigation into Chandler's death determined it resulted from medical malpractice, and his children sued the hospital and the doctors involved for $1.5 million. The lawsuit was settled for $233,258. A joint statement was released in which all parties agreed that no fault was admitted by the hospital or doctors.

Chandler's estate was worth $600,000, which he left to his daughters. His ex-wife sued his estate for $80,000 for money owed under their divorce settlement.

For his contribution to the motion picture industry, Chandler has a star on the Hollywood Walk of Fame, at 1770 Vine Street.

== Critical appraisal ==
Film historian David Shipman wrote this analysis of Chandler's image:

Jeff Chandler looked as though he had been dreamed up by one of those artists who specialise in male physique studies, or a mite further up the artistic scale, he might have been plucked bodily from some modern mural on a biblical subject. For that he had the requisite Jewishness (of which he was very proud) – and he was not quite real. Above all, he was impossibly handsome. He would never have been lost in a crowd, with that big, square, sculpted 20th century face and his prematurely grey wavy hair. If the movies had not found him the advertising agencies would have. In fact, whenever you saw a still of him you looked at his wrist-watch or pipe before realizing that he wasn't promoting something. In colored stills and on posters, his studio always showed his hair as blue, heightening the unreality. His real name was Ira Grossel and his film-name was exactly right.

An obituary of Chandler said:

Known for his careful attention to detail in making pictures, Chandler was often described as introverted. But colleagues who worked with him closely said he had an easy, light-hearted approach on the set that helped ease some of the strain of production.

In a 1960 interview Chandler said his favorite films were Broken Arrow, Battle of Apache Pass, Two Flags West, Because of You ("my first real love story"), Sign of the Pagan, The Toy Tiger ("a change for me"), Drango, Raw Wind in Eden ("beautiful locale"), and The Lady Takes a Flyer ("I had Lana Turner with me").

== Influence ==
The famed animated action-adventure series Jonny Quest's handsome, white-haired, veteran special agent bodyguard Race Bannon's design was modeled after Jeff Chandler by show creator Doug Wildey.

== Filmography ==
Year	Title	Role	Notes
1945	Thrill of a Romance	Singer	Uncredited
1947	Johnny O'Clock	Turk	Film debut; uncredited
1947	The Invisible Wall	Al Conway, henchman	
1947	Roses Are Red	Knuckles	
1949	Mr. Belvedere Goes to College	Pratt	Uncredited
1949	Sword in the Desert	Asvan Kurta	Led to Chandler signing a long-term contract with Universal
1949	Abandoned	Chief MacRae	Alternative title: Abandoned Woman
1950	Broken Arrow	Cochise	Academy Award nomination for Best Supporting Actor
1950	Deported	Vic Smith	
1950	The Desert Hawk	Opening Off-Screen Narrator	Uncredited
1950	Abbott and Costello in the Foreign Legion	Narrator	Voice; uncredited
1950	Two Flags West	Major Henry Kenniston	
1951	Double Crossbones	Narrator	Voice; uncredited
1951	Bird of Paradise	Tenga	
1951	Smuggler's Island	Steve Kent	
1951	Iron Man	Coke Mason	
1951	Meet Danny Wilson	Jeff Chandler – Nightclub Patron	Cameo; uncredited
1951	Flame of Araby	Tamerlane	Alternative title: Flame of the Desert
1952	The Battle at Apache Pass	Cochise	
1952	Red Ball Express	Lt. Chick Campbell	
1952	Son of Ali Baba	Opening Narrator	Voice; uncredited
1952	Yankee Buccaneer	Cmdr. David Porter	
1952	Because of You	Steve Kimberly	
1953	Girls in the Night	Off-Screen Narrator at Finish	Voice; uncredited. Alternative title: Life After Dark
1953	The Great Sioux Uprising	Jonathan Westgate	
1953	East of Sumatra	Duke Mullane	
1953	War Arrow	Major Howell Brady	
1953	Southern Cross	Narrator	Documentary about missions in the South
1954	Taza, Son of Cochise	Cochise	Uncredited
1954	Yankee Pasha	Jason Starbuck	
1954	Sign of the Pagan	Marcian	
1955	Foxfire	Jonathan Dartland	
1955	Female on the Beach	Drummond Hall	
1955	The Spoilers	Roy Glennister	
1955	The Nat King Cole Musical Story	Narrator	Short
1956	The Toy Tiger	Rick Todd	
1956	Away All Boats	Captain Jebediah S. Hawks	
1956	Pillars of the Sky	First Sergeant Emmett Bell	Alternative title: The Tomahawk and the Cross
1957	Drango	Major Clint Drango	Also produced
1957	The Tattered Dress	James Gordon Blane	
1957	Man in the Shadow	Ben Sadler	Alternative titles: Pay the Devil, Seeds of Wrath
1957	Jeanne Eagels	Sal Satori	Alternative title: The Jeanne Eagels Story
1958	The Lady Takes a Flyer	Mike Dandridge	Alternative titles: A Game Called Love, Lion in the Sky, Wild and Wonderful
1958	Raw Wind in Eden	Mark Moore / Scott Moorehouse	
1959	A Stranger in My Arms	Major Pike Yarnell	Alternative title: And Ride a Tiger
1959	Thunder in the Sun	Lon Bennett	
1959	Ten Seconds to Hell	Karl Wirtz	Alternative title: The Phoenix
1959	The Jayhawkers!	Luke Darcy	
1960	The Plunderers	Sam Christy	Also producer
1960	A Story of David	King David	Alternative title: A Story of David: The Hunted
1961	Return to Peyton Place	Lewis Jackman	
1962	Merrill's Marauders	Brig. Gen. Frank D. Merrill	Posthumous release (final film role)

=== Unmade films ===
- One Way Street (1950) – originally announced for the lead
- Steel Town with Ann Sheridan (1951)
- The Angry River (1952) – story of the Powell Geographic Expedition of 1869
- Vermillion O'Toole with Ann Sheridan (1952)
- The Holy Grail (1953) – religious epic set in 6 AD for Universal
- Huk (1954) – World War Two film written by Stirling Silliphant
- Young Moses (1954)
- Chief Crazy Horse (1955) – mentioned for the role played by Victor Mature
- Lincoln McKeever (1956) – based on a novel by Eliezar Lipsky about a frontiersman appointed to the Supreme Court; meant to be the second film Chandler made for his own company and United Artists, after Drango
- The Gallileans (1956) for producer Aaron Rosenberg

== Theatre ==
- The Trojan Horse – Oct 1940 – Long Island
- Meet the World by Peg Fenwick – March 30, 1950 – a UNESCO-sponsored play about the United Nations at UCLA
- Newsbeat 1950 by Joseph Roos – March 1950 – one-off performance for Federation of Jewish Welfare Organisations
- Pageant of Stars – October 11, 1950

== Select radio credits ==
=== Regular role ===
- Michael Shayne (1948–49)
- The New Adventures of Michael Shayne (1949)
- Our Miss Brooks 1948–1953
- Frontier Town 1952–1953 (billed as "Tex Chandler")

=== Guest appearances ===
- "Young Mr. Lincoln" – Academy Award Theatre (July 10, 1946)
- "Photo Finish" – Suspense (July 1946)
- "With Cradle and Clock" – Cavalcade of America (February 2, 1946)
- "Gregory Hood, Suspect" – The Casebook of Gregory Hood (September 30, 1946)
- "Blood On Sun" – Academy Award Theatre (October 16, 1946)
- "The Black Curtain" – Suspense (January 3, 1948)
- "Snake Doctor" – Escape (February 8, 1948)
- "Blond Mink", "Leopard's Spots", "Social Error", "Palm Beach Santa Claus" – Damon Runyon Theatre (1949)
- "All My Sons" – Screen Directors Playhouse (Dec 1949) – with Edward G. Robinson
- "Lifeboat" – Screen Directors Playhouse (November 16, 1950) – with Tallulah Bankhead
- "Hired Wife" – Screen Directors Playhouse (1951) – with Rosalind Russell
- "Only Yesterday" – Screen Directors Playhouse (July 1951) – with Mercedes McCambridge
- "Steel River Prison Break" – Suspense (September 3, 1951)
- "The Joyful Hour" (December 1951)
- "Ben Hur" – Hallmark Playhouse (April 10, 1952)
- "The Woodsman" – The Woodsman (July 20, 1952)
- "The Web" – Broadway Playhouse (July 1, 1953)
- "Black Is the Color of My True Love's Hair" – Suspense (October 19, 1953)
- "The Thief" – Suspense (1957)
- "A Good Neighbor" – Suspense (March 31, 1957)

== Singing ==
Chandler had a concurrent career as a singer and recording artist, releasing several albums and playing nightclubs. In 1955 he became only the second star to play at the Riviera, after Liberace was the featured headliner. In her autobiography Hold the Roses (2002), Rose Marie wrote that "Jeff Chandler was a great guy, but he was no singer. He put together an act and we opened at the Riviera. He came with a conductor, piano player, light man, press agent, and manager. None of it helped, and everybody raved about Jeff's singing, but let's face it: He really didn't sing very well. He definitely had guts to open in Vegas". He left to work on a movie after three and a half weeks.

A May 1955 review of a Chandler live performance in Variety said "it is in the realm of pure song" that Chandler "falters and shows weakness."

== Album discography ==
Year	Album	Label	Format	Catalogue No.
1957	Jeff Chandler Sings To You	Liberty Records	LP	LRP 3067
1958	Warm And Easy	Liberty Records	LP	LRP 3074
1966	Sincerely Yours	Sunset Records	LP	SUS-1527

== Singles discography ==
Year	Title	Label	Format	Catalogue No.
1954	I Should Care/More Than Anyone	Decca Records	45 r.p.m.	9-29004
	Lamplight/That's All She's Waiting To Hear			9-29175
	Always/Everything Happens To Me			9-29345
1955	My Prayer/When Spring Comes Along			9-29405
	Foxfire/Shaner Maidel			9-29532
	Only The Very Young/A Little Love Can Go A Long, Long Way			9-29600/9-29532
1957	Half Of My Heart/Hold Me	Liberty Records		F-55092

== Award nominations ==
Year	Award	Category	Nominated work	Result	Ref.
1950	Academy Awards	Best Supporting Actor	Broken Arrow	Nominated	
1958	Laurel Awards	Top Male Star	—N/a	14th Place	
1959	Laurel Awards	Top Male Star	—N/a	15th Place	
1950	Picturegoer Awards	Best Actor	Broken Arrow	Nominated	

== Box office rankings ==
For a number of years, film exhibitors voted Chandler among the top stars at the box office.

- 1952 – 22nd (US)
- 1953 – 18th (US)
- 1954 – 16th (US)
- 1955 – 20th (US), 7th (UK)
- 1956 – 18th (US), 5th (UK)
- 1957 – 22nd (US), 6th (UK)
