= James Nolan (actor) =

American film, stage and television actor (1915–1985)

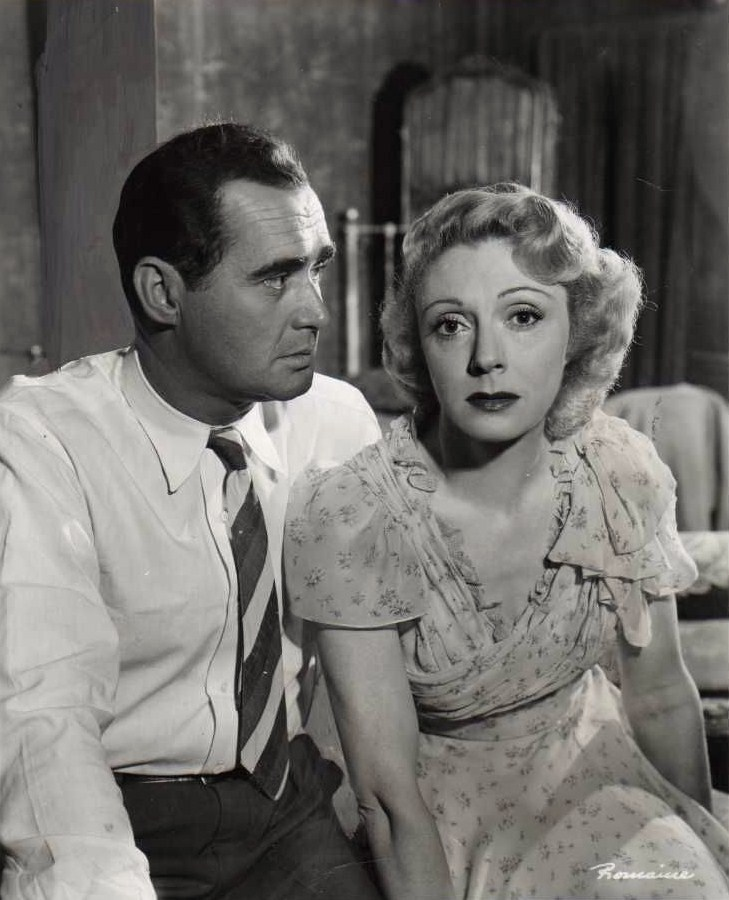
- Nolan (left) with Judith Evelyn in A Streetcar Named Desire, 1950
- Born: James F. Nolan; November 29, 1915; San Francisco, California, U.S.
- Died: July 29, 1985 (aged 69); Woodland Hills, California, U.S.
- Occupation: Actor
- Years active: 1937–1982

James F. Nolan (November 29, 1915 – July 29, 1985) was an American film, stage and television actor.

Nolan was born in San Francisco, California. After serving in World War II he began his acting career in New York, performing in stage plays such as A Streetcar Named Desire and Bus Stop. Nolan then moved to Hollywood, California.

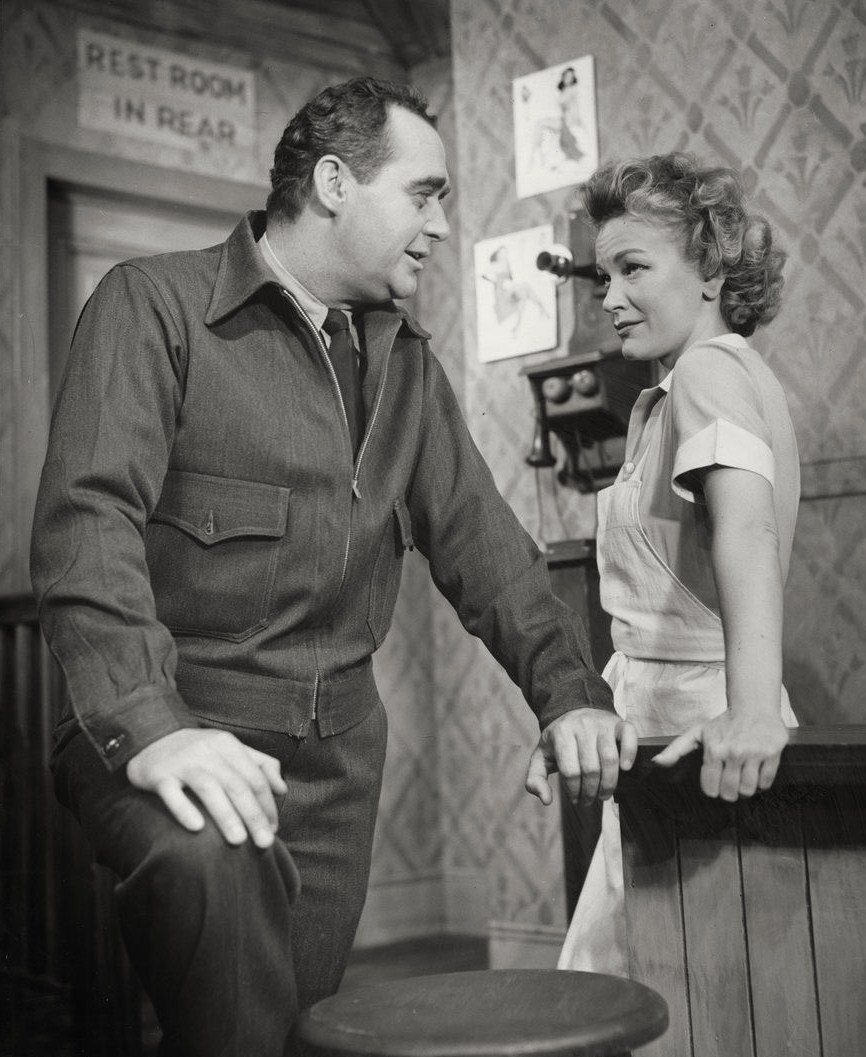
Nolan (left) with Winifred Ainslee in Bus Stop, 1955

Nolan guest-starred in numerous television programs including Gunsmoke, The Adventures of Ozzie and Harriet, The Fugitive, Get Smart, Harbor Command, The Wild Wild West, McHale's Navy, Leave It to Beaver, Emergency!, The Jack Benny Program, The Waltons, The Twilight Zone, Perry Mason, Adam-12 and The Mary Tyler Moore Show. He also appeared in films, including Charley Varrick, Support Your Local Gunfighter, Dirty Harry, All Night Long, The Toolbox Murders and The Shootist. He played the role of the priest Father Steven Lonigan in the 1970 film Airport.

Nolan died in July 1985 of cancer at the Motion Picture & Television Fund cottages in Woodland Hills, California, at the age of 69.

== Selected filmography ==
- Torchy Blane in Panama (1938) as Ship's Officer Nelson
- Little Miss Thoroughbred (1938) as First Intern at General Hospital
- When Were You Born (1938) as Ship Passenger (uncredited)
- Cowboy from Brooklyn (1938) as Alvey's Secretary (uncredited)
- Racket Busters (1938) as Jim Smith, Allison's Secretary (uncredited)
- Boy Meets Girl (1938) as Young Man Brought in for Susie (uncredited)
- Garden of the Moon (1938) as Sound Man with Microphone (uncredited)
- Girls on Probation (1938) as Dave Warren, Connie's Date (uncredited)
- Men Are Such Fools (1938) as Bill Collyer (uncredited)
- Winged Victory (1944) as Stranger on Street (uncredited)
- Because of Him (1946) as Reporter (uncredited)
- Little Miss Big (1946) as Detective Lieutenant (uncredited)
- The Brute Man (1946) as Police Dispatcher (uncredited)
- Lady in the Lake (1946) as Party Guest (uncredited)
- Abie's Irish Rose (1946) as Policeman
- Alias Mr. Twilight (1946) as Customs Guard (uncredited)
- The Beginning or the End (1947) as President Roosevelt's Bodyguard (uncredited)
- Dark Delusion (1947) as Orderly (uncredited)
- Unconquered (1947) as Villager (uncredited)
- Dick Tracy Meets Gruesome (1947) as Dan Sterne
- The Miracle of the Bells (1948) as Tod Jones
- Berlin Express (1948) as ROT Captain on First Train (uncredited)
- Fighting Father Dunne (1948) as Policeman Danny Briggs
- The Arizona Ranger (1948) as Nimino Welch
- Guns of Hate (1948) as Sheriff Bradley
- Race Street (1948) as Herbie
- They Live by Night (1948) as Schreiber
- Sons of Adventure (1948) as Frank, Publicity Man (uncredited)
- Night Time in Nevada (1948) as Jim Andrews
- Son of God's Country (1948) as Bill Sanger
- Rogues' Regiment (1948) as American Colonel
- He Walked by Night (1948) as Harry (uncredited)
- The Countess of Monte Cristo (1948) as Lieutenant (uncredited)
- One Sunday Afternoon (1948) as Henry (uncredited)
- Wake of the Red Witch (1948) as First Diver (uncredited)
- The Lucky Stiff (1949)
- Siren of Atlantis (1949) as Major
- Daughter of the Jungle (1949) as Lamser
- The Clay Pigeon (1949) as Faber (uncredited)
- Outpost in Morocco (1949) as Legionnaire Colonel's Aide (uncredited)
- Death Valley Gunfighter (1949) as Shad
- The Stratton Story (1949) as Reporter (uncredited)
- The Window (1949) as Stranger on Street (uncredited)
- Illegal Entry (1949) as Agent Benson
- Too Late for Tears (1949) as Detective Parker (uncredited)
- Bandit King of Texas (1949) as Dan McCabe
- Thieves' Highway (1949) as Smaller Cop at Roadside Bar (uncredited)
- Flame of Youth (1949) as Policeman (uncredited)
- Strange Bargain (1949) as Policeman (uncredited)
- The Woman on Pier 13 (1949) as Policeman (uncredited)
- Alias the Champ (1949) as Al Merlo
- Rusty's Birthday (1949) as Motor Officer (uncredited)
- Mary Ryan, Detective (1949) as Detective Johnson (uncredited)
- Adam's Rib (1949) as Dave (uncredited)
- Port of New York (1949) as Charles Lindsay (uncredited)
- Paid in Full (1950) as Charlie Malloy, Lawyer (uncredited)
- Riding High (1950) as Deputy (uncredited)
- Double Dynamite (1951) as Detective (uncredited)
- The Boss (1956) as Matt's Lawyer (uncredited)
- Alfred Hitchcock Presents (1957) (Season 2 Episode 21: "Number Twenty-Two") as Detective Kelly
- The Big Caper (1957) as Police Sergeant Waldo Harris (uncredited)
- The Big Circus (1959) as Police Lieutenant (uncredited)
- Portrait in Black (1960) as Detective
- An American Dream (1966) as Monsignor Jim (uncredited)
- Madigan (1968) as Detective (uncredited)
- Airport (1970) as Father Steven Lonigan
- Support Your Local Gunfighter (1971) as Train Conductor (uncredited)
- Dirty Harry (1971) as Liquor Proprietor
- Charley Varrick (1973) as Clerk
- The Shootist (1976) as Gambler (uncredited)
- Telefon (1977) as Appliance Store Clerk
- The Toolbox Murders (1978) as Bartender
- All Night Long (1981) as Grandfather Gibbons
- Jinxed! (1982) as Father
