= Illegal Entry (film) =

1949 film by Frederick de Cordova

- Film poster
- Directed by: Frederick De Cordova
- Written by: Art Cohn (adaptation)
- Screenplay by: Joel Malone
- Based on: Ben Bengal; Herbert Kline; Dan Tyler Moore (as Kline Tyler Moore) (based on a story by)
- Produced by: Jules Schermer
- Starring: Howard Duff; Märta Torén; George Brent
- Cinematography: William H. Daniels
- Edited by: Edward Curtiss
- Music by: Milton Schwarzwald
- Color process: Black and white
- Production company: Universal Pictures
- Distributed by: Universal Pictures
- Release date: June 8, 1949 (Washington D.C.)
- Running time: 84 minutes
- Country: United States
- Language: English
- Budget: $590,000

Illegal Entry is a 1949 American film noir crime film directed by Frederick De Cordova and starring Howard Duff, Märta Torén and George Brent. The film and its treatment of illegal entry and unlawful residence in the United States is introduced by Watson B. Miller, the commissioner of the Immigration and Naturalization Service under President Harry S. Truman.

== Plot ==
An undercover agent (Howard Duff) attacks an illicit Mexican border immigrant smuggling operation.

== Cast ==
- Howard Duff as Bert Powers
- Märta Torén as Anna Duvak O'Neill
- George Brent as Chief Agent Dan Collins
- Gar Moore as Lee Sloan
- Tom Tully as Nick Gruber
- Paul Stewart as Zack Richards
- Richard Rober as Dutch Lempo
- Joseph Vitale as Joe Bottsy
- James Nolan as Agent Benson
- Clifton Young as Billy Rafferty
- David Clarke as Carl
- Robert Osterloh as Agent Crowthers
- Anthony Caruso as Teague
- Donna Martell as Maria

== Reception ==
=== Critical response ===
The New York Times film critic, Bosley Crowther, gave the film a mixed review, "A formidable introduction which features Attorney General Tom Clark and certain Immigration Bureau oficials who bespeak that service well does not camouflage Illegal Entry ... Howard Duff plays this hero in an acceptable rough-and-ready style and Marta Toren is attractive as the girl ... The backgrounds of southern California and Mexico are authentic enough. But the whole picture has the quality of a mechanical, oft-repeated show." The film was given a favorable review in other newspapers including one in the Rushville Republican (Indiana), published on September 27, 1949
