= Assignment – Paris! =

1952 film by Robert Parrish

- Italian poster
- Directed by: Robert Parrish
- Screenplay by: William Bowers; Walter Goetz (adaptation); Jack Palmer White (adaptation)
- Based on: Trial by Terror; 1952 book by Paul Gallico and Pauline Gallico
- Produced by: Samuel Marx; Jerry Bresler
- Starring: Dana Andrews; Märta Torén; George Sanders; Audrey Totter
- Cinematography: Ray Cory; Burnett Guffey
- Edited by: Charles Nelson; Donald W. Starling
- Music by: George Duning
- Color process: Black and white
- Production company: Columbia Pictures
- Distributed by: Columbia Pictures
- Release date: September 4, 1952
- Running time: 84 minutes
- Country: United States
- Language: English

Assignment – Paris! is a 1952 American Cold War film noir directed by Robert Parrish and starring Dana Andrews, Märta Torén, George Sanders and Audrey Totter. It was produced and distributed by Columbia Pictures.

== Plot ==
Paris-based New York Herald Tribune reporter Jimmy Race is sent by his boss behind the Iron Curtain in Budapest to investigate a meeting involving the Hungarian ambassador. While on assignment, Race is framed for espionage.

== Cast ==
- Dana Andrews as Jimmy Race
- Märta Torén as Jeanne Moray
- George Sanders as Nicholas Strang
- Audrey Totter as Sandy Tate
- Sandro Giglio as Gabor Czeki alias Grisha
- Donald Randolph as Anton Borvich
- Herbert Berghof as Prime Minister Andreas Ordy
- Ben Astar as Minister of Justice Vajos
- Willis Bouchey as Biddle - Editor
- Earl Lee as Dad Pelham
- Pál Jávor as Laslo Boros
- Georgiana Wulff as Gogo Czeki

== Production ==
Phil Karlson was the original director, but was fired during filming.

It was filmed on location in Paris and Budapest.
