= War Arrow =

1954 film by George Sherman

- Theatrical release poster
- Directed by: George Sherman
- Written by: John Michael Hayes
- Produced by: John W. Rogers
- Starring: Maureen O'Hara; Jeff Chandler; John McIntire
- Cinematography: William H. Daniels
- Edited by: Frank Gross
- Music by: Joseph Gershenson
- Production company: Universal Pictures
- Distributed by: Universal Pictures
- Release dates: December 26, 1953 (Los Angeles); January 6, 1954 (United States)
- Running time: 78 minutes
- Country: United States
- Language: English
- Box office: $1.4 million

War Arrow is a 1954 American Technicolor Western film directed by George Sherman and starring Maureen O'Hara, Jeff Chandler and John McIntire. Filmed by Universal Pictures and based on the Seminole Scouts, the film was shot in Agoura, California.

== Plot ==
Major Howell Brady (Jeff Chandler), a cavalry officer, is sent from Washington, D.C. to Fort Clark, Texas, to subdue a Kiowa uprising that has been raiding both white settlements and villages on Seminole reservations. Brady requests that the post commander Colonel Meade (John McIntire) send his troops out in fast moving small units to engage the Kiowa but the Colonel fears his men would be slaughtered in piecemeal actions and only feels the Kiowa are impressed by large numbers of troops.

Together with his two sergeants, Brady enlists the help of the Seminole chief, Maygro (Henry Brandon), by giving him $500 and promising his people food and land. The three of them arm 25 Seminoles with state of the art Henry repeating rifles and train them as counter guerrillas; luring the Kiowa in then ambushing them. Col. Meade and his officers resent Brady's interference and mistrust the Seminoles.

At Fort Clark, Brady meets and falls in love with Elaine Corwin (Maureen O'Hara), the widow of a cavalry officer. However, when "Brady's Bunch" of Seminoles successfully repel a Kiowa attack, Brady spots a white man with the Kiowa. Although he does not get a good look at him, he recovers his sabre. The engraved sabre turns out to belong to Captain R. G. Corwin, the supposedly deceased husband of Elaine. The Seminoles confirm Corwin is still alive through torturing a Kiowa prisoner.

Meanwhile, Meade fails to deliver promised food to the Seminole so Maygro leads his people from the fort. Brady steals the food from the fort and delivers it himself to Maygro, for which Meade jails Brady. Brady is freed by Elaine and some of the Seminoles.

Brady discovers the Kiowa are preparing to attack the fort that is defended by only 20 men due to Meade's forces being away pursuing the elusive Kiowa. He returns to warn Meade, but he ignores him. He is about to throw Brady back in jail when a cavalry patrol returns with the same news that the Kiowa are preparing to attack. A fierce battle ensues and the Kiowa are defeated. Amongst the dead is the traitor R. G. Corwin, whom it turns out has been collaborating with a group of Mexicans to incite war.

== Cast ==
- Maureen O'Hara as Elaine Corwin
- Jeff Chandler as Maj. Howell Brady
- John McIntire as Col. Jackson Meade
- Suzan Ball as Avis
- Noah Beery Jr. as Sgt. Augustus Wilks (as Noah Beery)
- Charles Drake as 1st Sgt. Luke Schermerhom
- Henry Brandon as Chief Maygro
- Dennis Weaver as Pino
- Jay Silverheels as Santanta
- Jim Bannon as Capt. Roger G. Corwin (as James Bannon)
- Stephen Wyman as Captain Neil (as Steve Wyman)
- Bradford Jackson as Lieutenant (as Brad Jackson)

== Production ==
The film was known as Brady's Bunch. John Michael Hayes wrote the original story and there was reported interest from the studios about turning it into a vehicle for Burt Lancaster, Errol Flynn and Tyrone Power before it was bought by Universal for Jeff Chandler.

Filming started 2 March 1953. O'Hara said that "Jeff Chandler was a nice man but a bad actor."

John Michael Hayes later said his script was based on a true story of Seminole Indians being moved from Florida to Arizona because they were rebellious and being used as scouts to subdue the Kiowa. "The director, George Sherman, took out four action scenes and replaced them with four talk scenes, which talked about the action but didn't show it. The studio heads at Universal later said, "We know what happened: It's not your fault"."

== See also ==
- List of American films of 1954
