= Rogues' Regiment =

1948 film by Robert Florey

- Original film poster
- Directed by: Robert Florey
- Written by: Robert Buckner
- Based on: original story by Robert Buckner; Robert Florey
- Produced by: Robert Buckner
- Starring: Dick Powell; Märta Torén; Vincent Price
- Cinematography: Maury Gertsman
- Edited by: Ralph Dawson
- Music by: Daniele Amfitheatrof
- Color process: Black and white
- Production company: Robert Buckner Productions
- Distributed by: Universal Pictures
- Release date: 1948
- Running time: 86 minutes
- Country: United States
- Language: English
- Box office: $1.8 million

Rogues' Regiment is a 1948 American action war film directed by Robert Florey and starring Dick Powell, Märta Torén, and Vincent Price. It is the first American feature film to be set in the First Indochina War.

== Plot ==
An American Intelligence Agent and Nazi hunter is on the trail of a former SS war criminal reminiscent of Martin Bormann believed to be hiding in the French Foreign Legion in French Indochina. He joins forces with a French Intelligence agent investigating supplies of weapons to the Việt Minh from the Eastern Bloc.

== Cast ==
- Dick Powell as Whit Corbett
- Märta Torén as Lili Maubert
- Vincent Price as Mark Van Ratten
- Stephen McNally as Martin Bruener a.k.a. Carl Reicher
- Edgar Barrier as Colonel Mauclaire
- Henry Rowland as Erich Otto Heindorf
- Carol Thurston as Li-Ho-Kay
- James Millican as Cobb
- Richard Loo as Kao Pang
- Philip Ahn as Tran Duy Gian
- Richard Fraser as Rycroft
- Otto Reichow as Stein
- Kenny Washington as Sam Latch
- Dennis Dengate as O'Hara
- Frank Conroy as Colonel Lemercier
- Martin Garralaga as Hazeret
- James Nolan as American Colonel (James F. Nolan)
- Paul Coze as French Commander (also acted as film's technical adviser)

== Production ==
Max Ophüls was hoping to direct the film but was passed over in favour of Robert Florey.

The film was first announced in November 1947 with writer-producer Robert Buckner saying he was inspired by stories of former Nazis enlisting in the French Foreign Legion. In particular he researched the disappearance of Martin Bormann.

Edmond O'Brien was originally announced as star. It was made shortly after the production of another film about the French Foreign Legion, Outpost in Morocco. Burt Lancaster was sought for a supporting part.

In March 1948 it was announced Universal signed Dick Powell to play the lead. Edmond O'Brien dropped out of the film to make a movie with Deanna Durbin.

It was meant to be the 60th film directed by Robert Florey at Universal.

== Release ==
The Los Angeles Times said the film had an "arresting premise" which "went the way of just another cops and robbers chase".

The New York Times wrote that "if this man-hunt for a vicious, top-flight Nazi in the environs of Saigon bears more than a passing resemblance to a dozen other film chases of recent vintage, mark it down as topical, at least. If credibility is by-passed more than once, it is all done briskly and with good will."

== Adaptation ==
In 1951 Dick Powell reprised his role in a radio adaptation of the film on Screen Directors Playhouse.
