= Stephen McNally =

American actor (1911–1994)

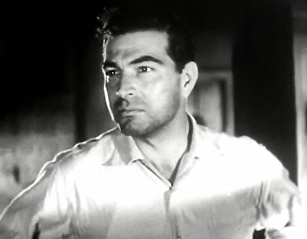
- McNally in Split Second (1953)
- Born: Horace Vincent McNally; July 29, 1911; New York City, U.S.
- Died: June 4, 1994 (aged 82); Beverly Hills, California, U.S.
- Occupations: Actor, attorney
- Years active: 1939–1980
- Spouse: Rita Wintrich (m. 1941)
- Children: 8

Stephen McNally (born Horace Vincent McNally; July 29, 1911 – June 4, 1994) was an American actor remembered mostly for his appearances in many Westerns and action films. His dark features often cast him as hard-hearted characters, criminals, bullies, and other villains.

== Early years ==
Stephen McNally was born Horace McNally in New York City. McNally attended Fordham University School of Law and was an attorney in the late 1930s before he pursued his passion for acting.

== Career ==
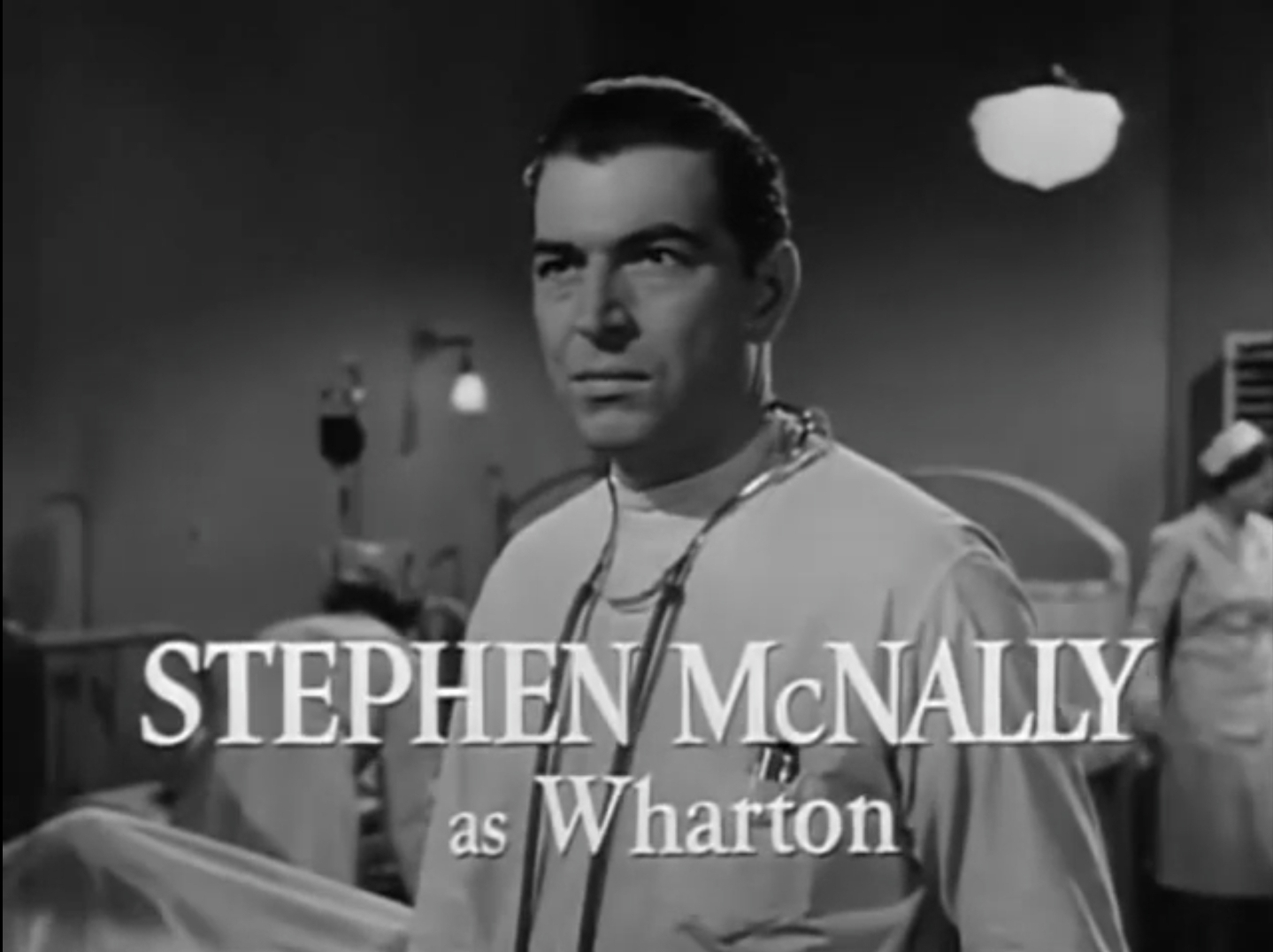
McNally in No Way Out (1950)

He started his stage career using his real name, Horace McNally. He was signed by Metro-Goldwyn-Mayer in 1942 and cast in supporting roles. His first juvenile lead was as a newspaper editor in the Laurel and Hardy comedy Air Raid Wardens (1943). He remained with MGM, always billed as Horace McNally, until 1946.

In 1948, he changed his stage name to Stephen McNally (taking the name of his then-2-year-old son) and signed with Warner Bros. He played the villainous Locky McCormick in the film version of Johnny Belinda (1948). (He had played Dr. Richardson in the Broadway stage version, in 1940.)

He appeared in Winchester '73 (1950) and co-starred in Criss Cross (1949). Notable 1950s films included No Way Out (1950), Split Second (1953), Violent Saturday (1955) and Johnny Rocco (1958).

McNally was cast in three episodes of the ABC religion anthology series Crossroads. He portrayed Monsigneur Harold Engle in "Ringside Padre" (1956) and Father Flanagan of the Boys Town orphanage in Nebraska in "Convict 1321, Age 21" (1957). In between, he was cast as United States Army General George S. Patton, in "The Patton Prayer" (also 1957). McNally also appeared in the episode "Specimen: Unknown" from the anthology series The Outer Limits. He starred in the 1959 episode, "The Ben Courtney Story" on Wagon Train as the title character, a former Union soldier turned sheriff. Also in 1959, he portrayed Clay Thompson, a bounty hunter, with Myron Healey as a sheriff, in the CBS Western series, The Texan.

In the 1960 episode "The Mormons" on the CBS Western, Dick Powell's Zane Grey Theatre McNally played Matt Rowland, who tries to block a wagon train of Mormons from entering his town, as they are suspected of carrying cholera. Things change quickly, when Rowland's son, Tod (Mark Goddard), becomes interested in a young lady on the train, Beth Lawson (Tuesday Weld).

In 1967, he starred as Dal Neely, a murderous outlaw who tries to take his daughter away with him in the (S12E23) episode "The Lure" on Gunsmoke. In 1971, he appeared as Gus Muller in "The Men From Shiloh" (rebranded name for the TV Western The Virginian) in the episode titled "The Angus Killer". During the 1970s, McNally guest starred on television programs such as Fantasy Island, Starsky & Hutch, Charlie's Angels, The Rockford Files, and Police Story.

== Death ==
McNally died of heart failure June 4, 1994, at age 82, at his home in Beverly Hills, California. He and his wife, Rita, had eight children.

== Partial filmography ==
- Grand Central Murder (1942) – 'Turk'
- The War Against Mrs. Hadley (1942) – Peters
- Eyes in the Night (1942) – Gabriel Hoffman
- For Me and My Gal (1942) – Mr. Waring
- Dr. Gillespie's New Assistant (1942) – Howard Allwinn Young
- Keeper of the Flame (1942) – Freddie Ridges
- Air Raid Wardens (1943) – Dan Madison
- The Man from Down Under (1943) – 'Dusty' Rhodes
- An American Romance (1944) – Teddy Roosevelt Dangos / Narrator
- Thirty Seconds over Tokyo (1944) – 'Doc' White
- Dangerous Partners (1945) – Co-pilot
- Bewitched (1945) – Eric Russell
- The Harvey Girls (1946) – 'Goldust' McClean
- Up Goes Maisie (1946) – Tim Kingby
- Magnificent Doll (1946) – John Todd
- Johnny Belinda (1948) – Locky McCormick
- Rogues' Regiment (1948) – Carl Reicher
- Criss Cross (1949) – Pete Ramirez
- City Across the River (1949) – Stan Albert
- The Lady Gambles (1949) – Horace Corrigan
- Sword in the Desert (1949) – David Vogel
- Woman in Hiding (1950) – Selden Clark IV
- Winchester '73 (1950) – Dutch Henry Brown
- No Way Out (1950) – Dr. Dan Wharton
- Wyoming Mail (1950) – Steve Davis
- Air Cadet (1951) – Major Jack Page
- Apache Drums (1951) – Sam Leeds
- Iron Man (1951) – George Mason
- The Lady Pays Off (1951) – Matt Braddock
- The Raging Tide (1951) – Lieutenant Kelsey
- Diplomatic Courier (1952) – Colonel Mark Cagle
- The Duel at Silver Creek (1952) – Marshal Lightning Tyrone
- Battle Zone (1952) – Sergeant Mitch Turner
- The Black Castle (1952) – Count Karl von Bruno
- Split Second (1953) – Sam Hurley
- The Stand at Apache River (1953) – Lane Dakota
- Devil's Canyon (1953) – Jessie Gorman
- Make Haste to Live (1954) – Steve Blackford
- A Bullet Is Waiting (1954) – Sheriff Munson
- The Man from Bitter Ridge (1955) – Alec Black
- Violent Saturday (1955) – Harper (bank robber)
- Tribute to a Bad Man (1956) – McNulty
- Hell's Crossroads (1957) – Victor 'Vic' Rodell
- Hell's Five Hours (1958) – Mike Brand
- The Fiend Who Walked the West (1958) – Marshal Frank Emmett
- Johnny Rocco (1958) – Tony Rocco
- Hell Bent for Leather (1960) – Deckett
- Requiem for a Gunfighter (1965) – Red Zimmer
- Panic in the City (1968) – James Kincade
- Once You Kiss a Stranger (1970) – Police Lieutenant Tom Gavin
- Black Gunn (1972) – Laurento
- The Lives of Jenny Dolan (1975, TV movie) – Lieutenant Nesbitt
- Hi-Riders (1978) – Mr. Lewis

== Radio appearances ==
Year	Program	Episode/source
1952	Hollywood Sound Stage	Ivy

== Television ==
Year	Title	Role	Notes
1959	Wagon Train	Sheriff Ben Courtney	Season 2 Episode 17: "The Ben Courtney Story"
1959	The Texan	Clay Thompson	Season 1 Episode 32: "Badlands"
1960	Laramie	Luke Wiley	Season 2 Episode 2: "The Track of the Jackal"
1961	Rawhide	Sky Blackstorm	Season 3 Episode 28: "Incident of the Blackstorms"
1961-1962	Target: The Corruptors!	Paul Marino	35 episodes
1963-1971	The Virginian	(1) Sheriff Avedon (2) Gus Muller	(1) Season 2 Episode 3: "No Tears for Savannah" (1963) (2) Season 9 Episode 18: "The Angus Killer" (1971)
1964	The Alfred Hitchcock Hour	Captain Tolman	Season 2 Episode 18: "Final Escape"
1964	The Fugitive	Jack Glennon	Season 2 Episode 13: "The Iron Maiden"
1967	Gunsmoke	Dal Neely	Season 12 Episode 23: "The Lure"
1969-1972	Mission: Impossible	(1) Kruger Schtelman (2) Carl Reid	(1) Season 4 Episode 7: "Submarine" (1969) (2) Season 7 Episode 6: "Cocaine" (1972)
1971	Mannix	Lawrence Powers	Season 5 Episode 9: "A Choice of Evils"
1974	The Rockford Files	Police Chief Austen Bailey	Season 1 Episode 4: "Exit Prentiss Carr"
1975-1977	Starsky & Hutch	George Prudholm	(1) Season 1 Episode 8: "Pariah" (1975) (2) Season 2 Episode 19: "Starsky's Lady" (1977)
1979	Charlie's Angels	Joseph Thurgood	Season 4 Episode 3: "Avenging Angel"
