= Because of You (1952 film) =

1952 film by Joseph Pevney

- Theatrical release poster
- Directed by: Joseph Pevney
- Screenplay by: Ketti Frings
- Story by: Thelma Robinson
- Produced by: Albert J. Cohen
- Starring: Loretta Young; Jeff Chandler; Alex Nicol
- Cinematography: Russell Metty
- Edited by: Virgil W. Vogel
- Music by: Frank Skinner
- Color process: Black and white
- Production company: Universal-International Pictures
- Distributed by: Universal-International Pictures
- Release dates: November 19, 1952 (Los Angeles); December 3, 1952 (New York)
- Running time: 95 minutes
- Country: United States
- Language: English

Because of You is a 1952 American romantic drama film directed by Joseph Pevney and starring Loretta Young and Jeff Chandler.

== Plot ==
Christine Carroll's gangster fiancé Mike slips stolen merchandise into her purse, causing her to become his unwitting accessory. She is sentenced to a prison sentence although she is innocent of the crime. Through the kindness of prison psychiatrist Dr. Breen, Christine turns her life around in prison, becoming a nurse's aide in the infirmary. Upon her release, Christine procures a job at a hospital, where she falls in love with wounded combat pilot Steve Kimberly, an architect from a good family. Christine's probation officer encourages her to tell Steve the truth about her past, but she does not. They marry and soon have a daughter named Kim.

Mike, fresh from his own prison sentence, appears. He will remain quiet about her past only if she drives him to Mexico, and she agrees. After another robbery, a high-speed chase and crash ensue, and Mike is killed. Christine and Kim survive the wreck.

Steve is enraged and files for divorce, winning full custody of Kim. Years later, Christine takes a job as an assistant for a magician. She sees in the newspaper that Steve is in Paris for a meeting and tries to seize the opportunity to see Kim. In a taxi, she follows a car leaving Steve's house that leads her to the home of Steve's twin sister Susan, who informs Christine that seven-year-old Kim is an unhappy, maladjusted child. Christine joins a clown who is performing at a children's party there. Kim is in the audience but she does not recognize Christine as her mother.

Christine begins appearing at children's parties and promoting herself as Miss Marvel, hoping to occasionally see Kim. Susan sees her advertisement and takes pity on her. Susan, despite her husband's objections, finds Christine and invites her to stay at her home for a short while. Christine and Kim develop a close relationship.

Steve returns home unexpectedly and is furious with Susan when he discovers Christine living in his house. Susan tells him that Kim has serious problems and needs the care of a mother. Christine leaves, expecting to never see Kim again.

Steve finds Christine at her parents' farm in Oregon. He now realizes that he needs Christine as an equal partner to share his life and to help raise Kim properly. She happily accepts his proposal to remarry.

== Cast ==
- Loretta Young as Christine Carroll Kimberly
- Jeff Chandler as Steve Kimberly
- Alex Nicol as Mike Monroe
- Frances Dee as Susan Arnold
- Alexander Scourby as Dr. Breen
- Lynne Roberts as Rosemary Balder
- Gayle Reed as Kim Kimberly
- Mae Clarke as Miss Peach/Nurse Peachie
- Billy Wayne as George
- Morris Ankrum as Dr. Travis
- Helen Wallace as Mrs. Gordon
- Harry Mendoza as Bumbo
- Vici Raaf as Vera
- Betty Reilly as Singer
- Bill Cassady as Patient

== Production ==
In October 1951, Universal Pictures bought the story "Magic Lady", which was written for the screen by Thelma Robinson and George Haight. In March 1952, Universal announced that the film would star Loretta Young, with Albert Cohen as producer and Joseph Pevney as director, and that the script would be written by Ketti Frings. Later that month, Jeff Chandler joined the cast as Young's costar, his first romantic screen role.

Filming began on April 15, 1952. In July 1952, the title was changed from Magic City to Because of You.

According to Young, she was attracted to Chandler and he told her that he was falling in love with her. The relationship never turned romantic, but Young later said: "I think until he died, we both felt it. If I'd see him on the street I'd walk the other way because I didn't want to spark anything." Several years after the film's release, Chandler named it as one of his favorite films in which he had appeared.

== Music ==
The title song, "Because of You", was Tony Bennett's first hit recording, reaching #1 in 1951 and becoming one of his signature songs.

== Reception ==
In a contemporary review for The New York Times, critic Bosley Crowther called the film an "amalgam of absurdities and goo" and wrote: "Don't expect explanation or serious criticism of this film. It plainly defies the second, just as much as it does the first. The acting and direction are as soggy and artless as is the script, and the whole picture has the torpid limpness of movie drama on the lowest mental plane. The only intriguing thing about it is the opportunity it affords to observe how blandly idiotic ladies and gentlemen can be sometimes in some films."

Critic Edwin Schallert of the Los Angeles Times wrote: "The woman's case will probably be directly appealing to women. The film itself isn't, however, either as soulful or as tearful as it might have been."

The film exceeded its box-office expectations at the Roxy Theatre in New York and was extended for several weeks beyond its originally scheduled engagement.

== Home media ==
In 1988, Universal Pictures released the film for home viewing as a VHS cassette. In 2021, the film was released on Blu-ray disc as part of Kino Lorber's Film Noir: The Dark Side of Cinema V box set.

== See also ==
- List of American films of 1952

== Sources ==
- Funk, Edward. Behind the Door: The Real Story of Loretta Young, Bear Manor Media, 2015.
