= Casbah (film) =

1948 film by John Berry

- Theatrical release poster
- Directed by: John Berry
- Written by: Ladislaus Bus-Fekete; Aarnold Manoff musical story Erik Charell
- Based on: Pépé le Moko; 1937 novel by Henri La Barthe
- Produced by: Nat C. Goldstone associate Erik Charell
- Starring: Yvonne De Carlo; Tony Martin; Peter Lorre; Märta Torén
- Cinematography: Irving Glassberg
- Edited by: Edward Curtiss
- Music by: Walter Scharf; Harold Arlen
- Production company: Marston Productions
- Distributed by: Universal Pictures
- Release date: April 1948
- Running time: 94 minutes
- Country: United States
- Language: English
- Budget: $1.3 million
- Box office: $1,092,283 (rentals)

Casbah is a 1948 American film noir crime musical film directed by John Berry starring Yvonne De Carlo, Tony Martin, Peter Lorre, and Märta Torén. It was nominated for an Academy Award for Best Original Song for the song "For Every Man There's a Woman".

It is a musical remake of Algiers (1938), which was in turn an American remake of the French film Pépé le Moko (1937).

== Plot ==
Pépé le Moko leads a gang of jewel thieves in the Casbah district of Algiers, where he has exiled himself to escape imprisonment in his native France. Inez, his girlfriend, is infuriated when Pépé flirts with Gaby, a French tourist who is visiting the area aboard a yacht with friends, and wealthy suitor, but Pépé tells Inez to mind her own business, that he will never forget her but he is leaving.

Detective Slimane is trying to lure Pépé out of the Casbah so that he can be jailed. Against Slimane's advice, Police Chief Louvain captures Pépé in a dragnet, but his followers free him. Inez realizes that that Pépé has fallen in love with Gaby and intends to follow her to Europe, Slimane also realises this, and sees an opportunity to catch a fleeing Pépé. One evening Pépé suddenly decides to escape, with side-kick Carlo until Inez informs him that Gabby is still in the area. Pépé rushes to find Gaby, sings, and they arrange to meet the next evening to leave together for Paris. Back on the yacht Gaby is still unsure, but her current boyfriend's mocking of her inability to live without his financing makes her determined.
Pépé is upset when Gaby does not show, but realises his accomplice Carlo is also working for Slimane. Carlo admits that Gaby was duped into believing Pépé had been killed, and is not at the hotel - where Slimane had planned an ambush - but at the airport, leaving. Pépé confidently strides out, leaving the safety of the Casbah, and manages to get past the boarding staff, we see an unaware Gaby at the aeroplane window and Pépé is about to board, until someone off-camera offers a light for his cigarette, and by his expression it's apparent Pépé has been caught. Inez is present, saying the Police made her co-operate, she screams as Pépé recklessly decides to run to Gaby, and is shot. Pépé sits slumped against Slimane, saying that Slimane has won, and Slimane coolly acknowledges that he knew he would.

== Cast ==
- Yvonne De Carlo as Inez
- Tony Martin as Pépé Le Moko
- Peter Lorre as Slimane
- Märta Torén as Gaby
- Hugo Haas as Omar
- Thomas Gomez as Louvain
- Douglas Dick as Carlo
- Herbert Rudley as Claude
- Gene Walker as Roland
- Curt Conway as Maurice
- Katherine Dunham as Odette

Cast notes:

- Eartha Kitt plays an uncredited bit part. This was her film debut.
- Kathleen Freeman plays an uncredited American Woman

== Production ==
The film was made by Marston Productions, Tony Martin's production company, who signed a deal with Universal. Tony Martin was keen to re-establish himself in the film industry after having been blacklisted in the entertainment industry since being discharged from the Navy for "unfitness" in 1942. He was charged with buying a Navy officer a car to facilitate his obtaining a chief specialists rating.

It was the first production from Marston, which Martin owned with his agent, Nat Gould. The Bank of America lent $800,000 to finance the film; Universal provided some of the balance.

Yvonne De Carlo signed to play the female lead in June 1947. Erik Charrell was to produce, William Bowers was to write the script and Harold Arlen to do the music. John Berry signed to direct.

Märta Torén made her American film debut here.

== Soundtrack ==
Songs by Harold Arlen (music) and Leo Robin (lyrics).

- "For Every Man There's a Woman", sung by Tony Martin.
- "Hooray for Love", sung by Tony Martin and Yvonne De Carlo.
- "It Was Written in the Stars", sung by Tony Martin.
- "What's Good About Goodbye", sung by Tony Martin.

== Reception ==
The film only recouped $600,000 of its cost. By September 24, 1949, the film had earned rentals of $1,092,283.

=== Lawsuits ===
Marston sued Universal in January 1949 for $250,000, alleging improper distribution. Universal counter-sued in May for $325,439, including the $320,439.25 Universal provided to the film-makers, and $5,000 which Universal claimed Marston distributed contrary to their agreement.

Universal succeeded in getting a court judgment against Marston of $350,000. A judge ordered that the film be offered for sale at auction. Universal bought all rights to the film at public auction for $5,000. This purchase was subject to an unsatisfied lien against the property of $195,000 to the Bank of America.

Martin had to go to court again to argue (successfully) that he was entitled to claim his loss on the film as a tax deduction.

=== Awards ===
In 1949, the film was nominated for an Academy Award for Best Original Song for the song "For Every Man There's a Woman" by Harold Arlen (music) and Leo Robin (lyrics).
