= One Way Street =

1950 film by Hugo Fregonese

- Theatrical release poster
- Directed by: Hugo Fregonese
- Written by: Lawrence Kimble
- Produced by: Leonard Goldstein
- Starring: James Mason; Märta Torén; Dan Duryea
- Cinematography: Maury Gertsman
- Edited by: Milton Carruth
- Music by: Frank Skinner
- Color process: Black and white
- Production company: Universal Pictures
- Distributed by: Universal Pictures
- Release dates: April 19, 1950 (Los Angeles); May 11, 1950 (New York)
- Running time: 79 minutes
- Country: United States
- Language: English

One Way Street [sic] is a 1950 American crime film noir directed by Hugo Fregonese and starring James Mason, Märta Torén and Dan Duryea. The film takes place mainly in Mexico.

== Plot ==
Physician Frank Matson steals $200,000 from mob boss John Wheeler, who has just completed his own heist along with his gang. Matson flees, intending to go to Mexico City, with Wheeler's girlfriend Laura Thorsen accompanying him. However, mechanical problems with the airplane force a landing in rural Mexico, where Matson and Laura establish a pleasant life and he provides medical treatment for the villagers.

Matson learns that Wheeler knows his location, so he and Laura return to Los Angeles, planning to return the money, only to find that Wheeler has been shot by Ollie, the one remaining member of Wheeler's gang. Matson shoots and kills Ollie.

Later, as Matson prepares to phone an airline to arrange his and Laura's return to Mexico, he is struck by a car traveling down the one-way street.

== Cast ==
- James Mason as Dr. Frank Matson
- Märta Torén as Laura Thorsen (as Marta Toren)
- Dan Duryea as John Wheeler
- Basil Ruysdael as Father Moreno
- William Conrad as Ollie
- Rodolfo Acosta as Francisco Morales
- King Donovan as Grieder
- Robert Espinoza as Santiago
- Tito Renaldo as Hank Morales
- Margarito Luna as Antania Morales
- Emma Roldán as Catalina (as Emma Roldan)
- George J. Lewis as Capt. Rodriguez (as George Lewis)

== Production ==
Jeff Chandler was originally announced for the lead role.

The film, whose working title was Death on a Side Street, created a "Mexican" village on the Universal Studios Lot in California.

While screenplay and story are credited to Lawrence Kimble, screenwriter Louise Rousseau is reported to have claimed the film used material from her original story "Haunted Heart."

== Reception ==
In a contemporary review for The New York Times, critic Bosley Crowther wrote: "What it all adds up to is a standard romantic melodrama illustrating the facts that crime obviously doesn't pay and that the scenery and people below the border are colorful ... Like its title, 'One Way Street' is explicitly obvious and not especially exciting."

== See also ==
- List of American films of 1950
