= The Fur Collar =

1962 British film by Lawrence Huntington

- Directed by: Lawrence Huntington
- Written by: Lawrence Huntington
- Produced by: Lawrence Huntington
- Starring: John Bentley; Martin Benson; Philip Friend
- Cinematography: S.D. Onions
- Edited by: Peter Weatherley
- Music by: John Fox
- Production company: Albatross
- Distributed by: J. Arthur Rank Film Distributors (UK)
- Release date: December 1962 (UK)
- Running time: 71 minutes
- Country: United Kingdom
- Language: English

The Fur Collar is a 1962 British second feature thriller film directed and written by Lawrence Huntington and starring John Bentley, Martin Benson and Philip Friend.

== Plot ==
A man wearing a fur-collared coat is shot on his arrival in Paris. A British journalist is convinced that he was intended victim, as he also wears a fur-collar, and has made dangerous enemies by an exposé.

== Cast ==
- John Bentley as Mike Andrews
- Martin Benson as Martin Benson
- Philip Friend as Eddie Morgan
- Nadja Regin as Marie Lejeune
- Balbina as Jacqueline Legrain
- Hector Ross as Roger Harding
- Gordon Sterne as Duclos
- Guy Middleton as resident
- Brian Nissen as Carl Jorgensen
- John Gabriel as hotel receptionist
- Tommy Duggan as foreign agent
- Murray Kash as Jules
- Eddie Mulloy as Donten
- Clarissa Stolz as chambermaid

== Critical reception ==
The Monthly Film Bulletin wrote: "A soporific thriller which wearily plods its way to a conventional unconvincing 'surprise' finish. The acting is as half-hearted as the story."

Kine Weekly wrote: "The plot, although somewhat extravagant, is tightly knit, and its characters are sharply drawn. The thrills, leavened by popular romance, spread evenly over its convenient running time, and the settings are colourful. ... The picture briskly moves in an authentic Paris environment and deploys its many characters astutely. John Bentley acquires a convincing American accent as the resourceful Mike, Martin Benson registers as Legrain, Nadja Regin is an attractive Marie, and Philip Friend wins some sympathy as the weak Eddie.
