= Winifred Ainslee =

American actress (1924–1991)

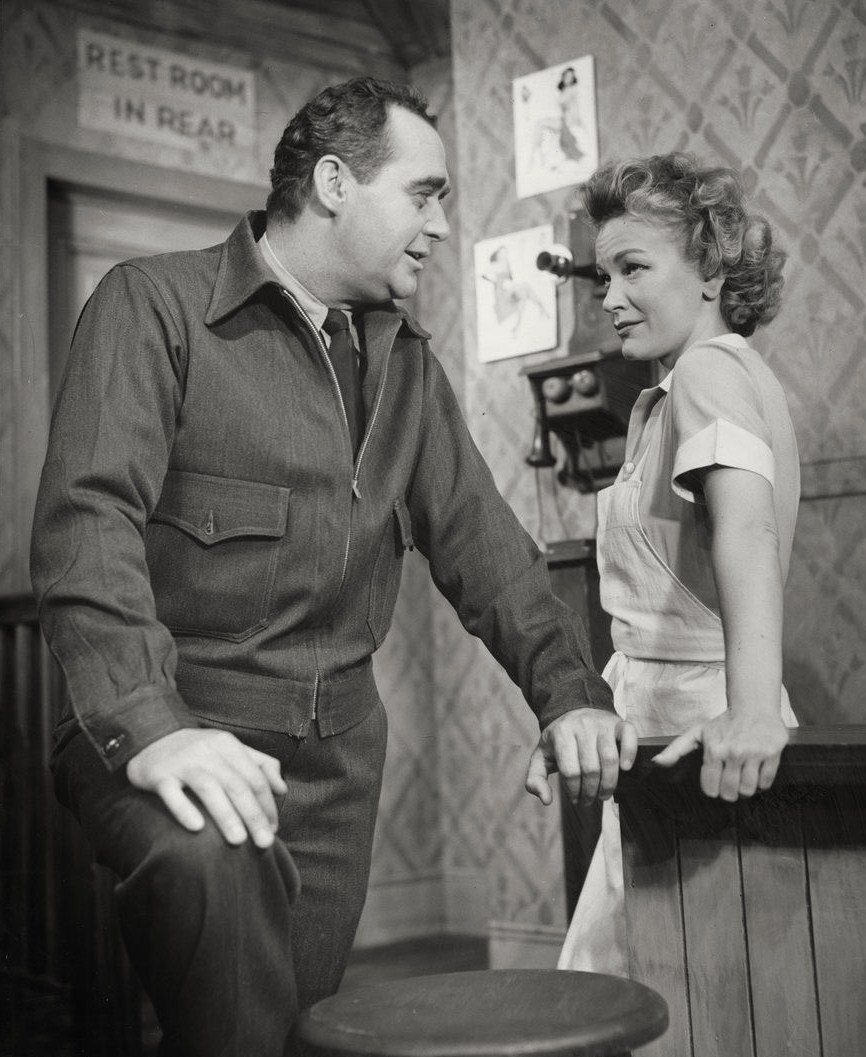
James Nolan and Ainslee in a touring production of Bus Stop, 1955

Winifred Ainslee (born Winifred MacIntosh; April 17, 1924 – December 14, 1991) was an American actress.

== Early years ==
Ainslee was born Winifred MacIntosh, the daughter of Dr. and Mrs. F. Bringle McIntosh. He was a Methodist minister who became president of Ohio Northern University. Winifred contracted polio at age 6, but although she was in a leg brace for several years, she made a complete recovery and took up ballet to strengthen the affected leg. She attended Randolph-Macon Woman's College and graduated from Ohio State University in 1947, double-majoring in English and Music. Before she finished college, she worked for a year as a [jazz] singer at the Cotton Club and a staff announcer at a radio station in Joplin, Missouri. She also studied at the Juilliard School. Ainslee took her stage name from Audra Ainslee, her aunt, who was leading lady with James K. Hackett.

== Career ==
In the late 1940s Ainslee was a member of the Chicago cast of Brigadoon. The production toured in other cities, including Oakland and St. Louis. In 1950, Ainslee appeared in all productions of the Summer at Pitt Stadium operetta season in Pittsburgh. She performed with the Chicago Music Theatre and the Pittsburgh Civic Light Opera, and she was musical director for touring productions of Brigadoon and Finian's Rainbow. In 1952 she was the female lead in a production of High Button Shoes in Chicago.

Ainslee performed on Broadway in Brigadoon (1950), Seventh Heaven (1955), and Auntie Mame (1958). Off-Broadway productions in which she appeared included What's Up (1953) She toured in Paint Your Wagon, Bus Stop, and Cat on a Hot Tin Roof.

Ainslee acted on television and was a Conover model. After she stopped performing, she worked for the Port Authority of New York and New Jersey until her retirement in the spring of 1991.

== Personal life ==
Ainslee was first married to Wells William Jenney in 1944; the union was annulled in 1945. Ainslee married fellow Brigadoon actor/singer James Schlader in Chicago on October 23, 1948. She married off-Broadway producer James Preston on March 5, 1959, in South Bend, Indiana. They have a daughter, Heather Lee Preston Buzasi.
