= Up Goes Maisie =

1946 film by Harry Beaumont

- Theatrical Film Poster
- Directed by: Harry Beaumont
- Written by: Thelma Robinson; Wilson Collison
- Produced by: George Haight
- Starring: Ann Sothern; George Murphy
- Cinematography: Robert H. Planck
- Edited by: Cotton Warburton
- Music by: David Snell
- Production company: Metro-Goldwyn-Mayer
- Distributed by: Loew's Inc.
- Release date: February 1, 1946
- Running time: 89 minutes
- Country: United States
- Language: English

Up Goes Maisie is a 1946 American comedy film directed by Harry Beaumont. Produced by Metro-Goldwyn-Mayer, it is the ninth of 10 films starring Ann Sothern as ex-showgirl Maisie Ravier, characterized as "that double trouble doll with the sassy chassis". In this series entry, Maisie, "the peppery lady with a golden heart" goes to work for an inventor and helicopter operator played by George Murphy.

== Plot ==
Determined to better herself, Maisie Ravier graduates from the Benson Business School in Los Angeles, but has to fend off the advances of Mr. Benson. She encounters the same problem at her first few job interviews: what the male bosses are interested in is not her secretarial skills. So she dresses as dowdily as she can and gets hired by Joseph "Joe" Morton. He has invented a helicopter that is easy to fly, and received financial backing from J. G. Nuboult.

When he learns of her deception, Joe suspects Maisie is an industrial spy, but she convinces him she was merely trying to avoid amorous bosses. He assures her she will have no such difficulty with him. He is thrilled to learn that during World War II, she had a job helping assemble the very bombers he himself flew, and introduces her to his men: wartime crewmates Mitch O'Hara and Bill Stuart, and college friend Tim Kingby. Then he sets her to work not only in the office, but also at welding and other assembly tasks. Eventually, Maisie and Joe fall in love.

Meanwhile, Joe persuades Seattle tycoon Floyd Hendrickson to come to a demonstration flight at the Rose Bowl in Pasadena. He will personally fly Hendrickson by aircraft to Los Angeles for this.

What Joe does not know is that Nuboult is scheming to steal his invention, assisted by Tim. After Maisie, now Joe's fiancée, notices that they are being billed for twice the correct number of some parts and decides to check their records for other occurrences, Nuboult's daughter Barbara distracts her by inviting her to a Sunday social at an exclusive club, where she spikes Maisie's drink. Maisie ends up diving into the pool with her clothes on, and Barbara makes sure this is reported as news. Feeling she would disgrace Joe, Maisie goes into hiding, but in fact Joe is distraught at her leaving. He and his men search desperately, contacting police and hiring a private detective.

While Joe is flying Hendrickson to the demonstration, the plotters set their plan into motion. They steal the prototype and substitute a partial copy, made with the duplicate parts Tim arranged for; then they burn down Joe's workshop with their copy inside. Maisie happens to hear about the fire and rushes there. She becomes suspicious when Nuboult shows up with Joe's canceled contract immediately after the fire is put out. When she cannot find in the wreckage the badges she welded to the helicopter for good luck, she guesses the truth.

Maisie, Mitch, and Bill find the real helicopter by following Tim. A fight breaks out when they try to get it back. Maisie is told to take the helicopter up. Having typed the manuals, she has learned enough to do it, and begins flying across Los Angeles. Worried by the tall buildings, she hovers just outside one and asks if there is a phone she can use. A startled cleaning woman passes one out to her, using the rope of a horizontal flagpole. She phones Joe at the Rose Bowl to ask for help. He begs her to land as soon as she can. But she manages to complete the flight to the Rose Bowl, where an impressed Hendrickson signs on to the project.

As Joe and Maisie kiss, the private detective returns to tell Joe he has located Maisie — in Kansas City.

== Cast ==
- Ann Sothern as Maisie Ravier
- George Murphy as Joseph Morton
- Hillary Brooke as Barbara Nuboult
- Stephen McNally as Tim Kingby
- Ray Collins as Mr. Floyd Hendrickson
- Jeff York as Elmer Saunders
- Paul Harvey as Mr. J.G. Nuboult
- Murray Alper as Mitch O'Hara
- Lewis Howard as Bill Stuart
- Jack Davis as Jonathan Marbey
- Gloria Grafton as Miss Wolfe
- John Eldredge as Benson
- Barbara Billingsley as Barb's Friend at Maisie's Engagement Party (uncredited)
- Connie Gilchrist as Cleaning Lady (uncredited)

== Production ==
The "egg-shaped" helicopter used in Up Goes Maisie was a non-flying studio made prop. Locales used in the film included the Rose Bowl game in Pasadena, California. Principal photography took place from August 1 to mid-September 1945. (Note: The 1945 Rose Bowl (31st Rose Bowl Game), college football bowl game was played on January 1, 1945, with the USC Trojans defeating the Tennessee Volunteers 25–0.)

== Reception ==
Up Goes Maisie was not well received by critics. Bosley Crowther, in his review for The New York Times, lamented, "If only the studio would not have our heroine being hoodwinked by the most obvious villians [sic]."He also thought that without Maisie "cruising around in that copter over Los Angeles and the Rose Bowl, everything would be more bearable." Still, Crowther ended by stating, "it's nice to have Maisie arrive again, even if it's in a slightly incredible vehicle."

Hal Erickson of AllMovie disagreed about the aerial sequence; "The process work in this climactic sequences [sic] is unusually good for an MGM production, providing an exciting wrap-up to an otherwise pedestrian project." TV Guide stated the series "was just about out of gas in 1946" and called Up Goes Maisie "standard stuff."

Aviation film historian James H. Farmer in Celluloid Wings: The Impact of Movies on Aviation (1984), noted that "the series was clearly running out of steam by its ninth outing."
