= Meyer Mishkin =

Hollywood agent

Meyer Mishkin (February 18, 1912 – October 9, 1999) was a Hollywood agent. His clients included Richard Dreyfuss, Tom Skerritt, Lee Marvin, Jim Davis, Marvin Kaplan, and Gary Busey. He was credited with helping discover Tyrone Power, Gregory Peck, Jeff Chandler, Richard Dreyfuss, Charles Bronson, and James Coburn.

== Biography ==
Mishkin was born and raised on New York's Lower East Side. After dropping out of the City College of New York to support his family, he obtained a job as errand boy at Fox Movietone News He was promoted to Fox's talent department, where he was assigned to monitor small theaters, nightclubs and vaudeville shows for new screen talent

Throughout his career, Meyer discovered several future successful entertainers in a variety of settings. He spotted Gregory Peck in New York's Neighborhood Playhouse, Anne Baxter while she performed in a stock theater in Dennis, Massachusetts, and the "grossly overweight" Vivian Blaine singing in a bar. He served as casting director for The House on 92nd Street (1945), 13 Rue Madeleine (1947) and Call Northside 777 (1948), all directed by his friend Henry Hathaway.

Mishkin moved to Los Angeles in 1948 to work as a talent agent for Huntington Hartford. The following year he established an independent talent agency.

As a talent agent, Mishkin assembled what came to be known "Meyer Mishkin's Band of Uglies," a group of character actors he represented that included Claude Akins, Lee Marvin, Charles Bronson, Jeff Chandler, James Coburn, Michael Ansara and Chuck Connors. Marvin, who was recommended to him by Hathaway, was one of his first clients in 1949.

Variety reported at his death that Mishkin had a reputation as an honest man and tough negotiator, and that he remained independent during his forty-year career despite offers from major talent agencies, such as William Morris. Among his later discoveries was Richard Dreyfuss, whom Mishkin first saw as a 15-year-old at Beverly Hills High School. Dreyfuss "was viewed as 'too short, too Jewish, too ethnic' until Mishkin convinced studios otherwise", Mishkin recounted in a 1978 profile.

Mishkin took credit for reviving Skerritt's career. The actor received positive attention for his movie roles in the early 1970s, but moved to Europe at the behest of a large talent agency and appeared in minor westerns. Under Mishkin's guidance he co-starred with Shirley MacLaine in The Turning Point (1977) and other prestigious films.
