= Märta Torén =

Swedish actress (1925–1957)

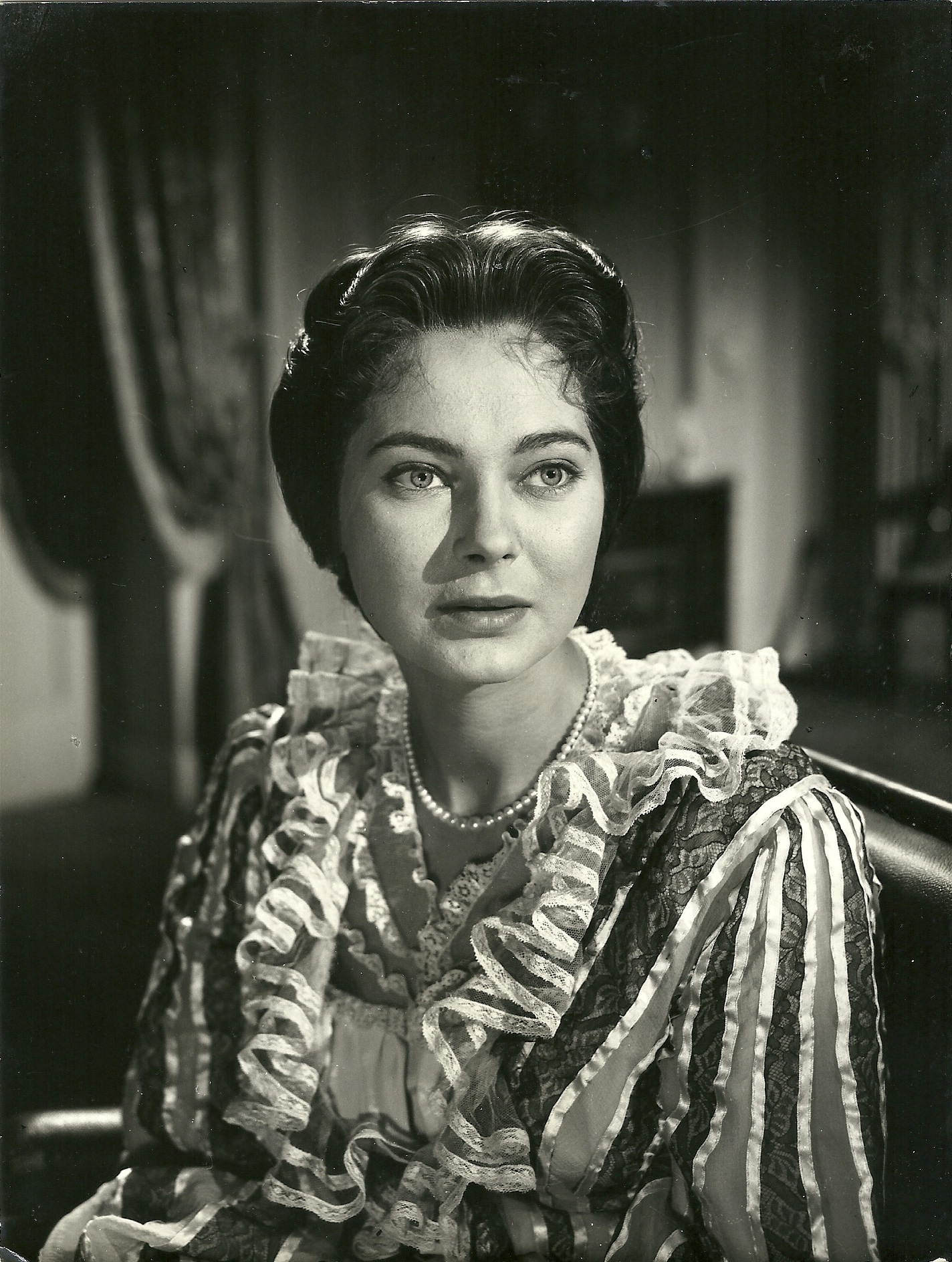
- Märta Torén in The Shadow (1954)
- Born: 21 May 1925; Stockholm, Sweden
- Died: 19 February 1957 (aged 31); Stockholm, Sweden
- Other name: Marta Toren
- Years active: 1942–1957
- Spouse: Leonardo Bercovici (m. 1952)
- Children: 1

Märta Torén (21 May 1925 – 19 February 1957) was a Swedish stage and film actress of the 1940s and 1950s.

== Biography ==
Torén's father was a Swedish military officer, and for three years, during World War II, he was a secretary in the Swedish war office.

After studying at the Stockholm Royal Dramatic Theatre's Royal Dramatic Training Academy, Torén began her career on the stage and from 1947 she appeared in films. She appeared on the cover of the 13 June issue of Life Magazine in 1949.

Torén appeared in 11 American film productions during her brief career. One of her roles was opposite Humphrey Bogart in Sirocco (1951), and she also co-starred with Dana Andrews in Assignment – Paris! (1952).

In 1952, Torén married screenwriter, film director, and producer Leonardo Bercovici, and they had one daughter.

Sophia Loren chose her stage name as a twist on Torén's.

=== Death ===
On 17 February 1957, Torén performed in a stage play at the Alle Theater in Stockholm. Later that evening, she became unconscious and was taken to hospital. On 19 February she died from a subarachnoid hemorrhage, at the age of 31.

== Filmography ==
Year	Title	Role	Notes
1942	Rospiggar	Young Guest at Atlantic	Uncredited
1942	Ride Tonight!	Woman from Brändbol	
1943	Ombyte av tåg	Young Woman in the Audience	Uncredited
1946	Johansson och Vestman		
1947	Eviga länkar	One of Signe's Daughters	Uncredited
1948	Casbah	Gaby	
1948	Rogues' Regiment	Lili Maubert	
1949	Illegal Entry	Anna Duvak O'Neill	
1949	Sword in the Desert	Sabra	
1950	One Way Street	Laura Thorsen	
1950	Spy Hunt	Catherine Ullven	
1950	Deported	Countess Christine di Lorenzi	
1950	Mystery Submarine	Madeline Brenner	
1951	Sirocco	Violette	
1952	Assignment – Paris!	Jeanne Moray	
1952	The Man Who Watched Trains Go By	Michele Rozier	
1953	Puccini	Elvira Puccini	
1954	Maddalena	Maddalena	
1954	House of Ricordi	Isabella Colbran	
1954	The Shadow	Alberta Landi	
1955	Golden Vein	Maria	
1957	Tormento d'amore	Sara García	
1957	The Open Door	Countess de Caroli	
