= Sword in the Desert =

1949 film by George Sherman

- Theatrical poster
- Directed by: George Sherman
- Written by: Robert Buckner
- Produced by: Robert Buckner
- Starring: Dana Andrews; Märta Torén; Stephen McNally
- Cinematography: Irving Glassberg
- Edited by: Otto Ludwig
- Music by: Frank Skinner
- Production company: Universal Pictures
- Distributed by: Universal Pictures
- Release dates: August 24, 1949 (New York City); September 28, 1949 (Los Angeles)
- Running time: 101 minutes
- Country: United States
- Language: English
- Budget: £200,000 or $1,175,000

Sword in the Desert is a 1949 American war film directed by George Sherman. It was the first American film to deal with the 1947–1948 Israeli War of Independence and marked the first significant feature film role for Jeff Chandler.

== Plot ==
Freighter owner and captain Mike Dillon reluctantly smuggles Jewish immigrants into Palestine, making it very clear to the Jewish leader, David Vogel, he is only doing it for the money. Dillon is annoyed to learn that he will have to go ashore to get paid the eight thousand U.S. dollars he is owed. When a British patrol boat arrives sooner than expected, Dillon is forced to join the Jews in their flight for freedom. There are casualties on both sides before the refugees get away, including one of Dillon's men.

== Cast ==
- Dana Andrews as Mike Dillon
- Märta Torén as Sabra
- Stephen McNally as David Vogel
- Jeff Chandler as Kurta
- Philip Friend as Lieutenant Ellerton
- Hugh French as Major Sorrell
- Liam Redmond as Jerry McCarthy
- Lowell Gilmore as Major Stephens
- Stanley Logan as Colonel Bruce Evans
- Hayden Rorke as Captain Beaumont
- George Tyne as Dov
- Peter Coe as Tarn
- Paul Marion as Jeno
- Marten Lamont as Captain Fletcher
- David Bauer as Gershon (as David Wolfe)

== Production ==
The screenplay was based on a short story by Robert Buckner, who came up with the idea after a visit to Palestine in 1934. Buckner later expanded this into a short story about Christmas in Palestine as experienced by a visiting American. In the 1940s he expanded this into a novel, then a screenplay, originally called Night Watch, then later Desert Legion.

Dick Powell had been considered for the role of the American, then Stephen McNally was chosen to play the American pilot, while Paul Christian was to play a Palestinian Jewish leader. However, when Christian had to drop out due to an eye infection, McNally took over his role, and Dana Andrews played McNally's part. Ann Blyth was intended to play the female lead. Buckner was originally announced as director, but George Sherman took over that task. Blyth was reassigned by Universal to Once More, My Darling and the female lead given instead to Märta Torén.

Jeff Chandler was cast in February 1949. The role was originally intended for an older actor but was reconfigured once Chandler was cast.

Production took place on Universal's backlot with location work at Monterey, California, the San Fernando Valley and Victorville in the Mojave Desert.

Even during filming, there was an expectation that the film would be controversial because it showed Jewish settlers fighting the British and not Arabs. Universal barred reporters from the set during the last week of filming because several London papers had carried adverse articles on the project.

== Controversy on release in Britain and Australia ==
The Evening Standard claimed that the film was "not for the eyes of Britons" and the Daily Telegraph insisted that British audiences would be surprised to see the unwonted harshness with which the British troops in the film treated Jewish civilians. There were demonstrations and disturbances outside the New Gallery cinema, near Piccadilly in London, when the film opened there on 2 February 1950, and pamphlets supporting Oswald Mosley's fascist Union Movement were distributed to people wanting to see it. The cinema also received a bomb threat. Mosley threatened to picket other cinemas that showed the film.

Five days later, the Public Control Committee of London Country Council followed the advice of the Home Office and prohibited further public showings of the film in order to prevent further scenes of rowdiness by fascist elements. It ignored a protest from the National Council for Civil Liberties, which claimed that its action constituted a ban on free speech.

The film was screened in Australia after some cuts, but was not shown in Tasmania because of its controversial content.
