= San Antonio (film) =

1945 western Technicolor film

- Theatrical poster
- Directed by: David Butler; Robert Florey (uncredited); Raoul Walsh (uncredited)
- Written by: Alan Le May; W. R. Burnett
- Produced by: Robert Buckner
- Starring: Errol Flynn; Alexis Smith
- Cinematography: Bert Glennon
- Edited by: Irene Morra
- Music by: Ray Heindorf; Max Steiner; M. K. Jerome; Erich Wolfgang Korngold (uncredited)
- Color process: Technicolor
- Production company: Warner Bros. Pictures
- Distributed by: Warner Bros. Pictures
- Release date: December 29, 1945
- Running time: 109 minutes
- Country: United States
- Language: English
- Budget: $2,232,000
- Box office: $3 million (US rentals in 1946) or $5,899,000

San Antonio is a 1945 American Western film starring Errol Flynn and Alexis Smith. The film was written by W. R. Burnett and Alan Le May and directed in Technicolor by David Butler as well as uncredited Robert Florey and Raoul Walsh.

The film was nominated for 2 Academy Awards, for Best Original Song ("Some Sunday Morning") and Best Art Direction (Ted Smith, Jack McConaghy).

== Plot ==
Rustlers are running rampant in Texas, but at least one rancher, Charlie Bell, isn't pulling up stakes yet, particularly with the news that old friend Clay Hardin is en route from Mexico back home to San Antonio.

Clay claims to have proof, documented in a book, that Roy Stuart is responsible for the rustling. Clay arrives in town in the stagecoach chartered by Jeanne Starr, an actress from the East whose manager, Sacha, has arranged a job performing in Stuart's saloon, believing it is a legitimate venue.

Clay dismisses Charlie's suspicions that Jeanne is in cahoots with her boss and goes to meet her in her dressing room. Clay does leave the book in Charlie's care. While Clay is wooing Jeanne on the balcony, Sacha goes out for a walk. Stuart fires at Clay, breaking the window behind them. Charlie is drawn to the gunfire. Legare (Stuart's business partner from New Orleans), who is watching, shoots Charlie, takes the book, and threatens Sacha.

There is no civil law in San Antonio: A cavalry troop has been posted to keep the town from boiling over. The Colonel holds a hearing investigating Charlie's death. Sacha is too afraid to testify. Clay is now suspicious of Jeanne. The troop has been ordered to pull out to deal with an "Indian whittle wang." Clay asks the Colonel to give him the job of town marshal so he can find out who killed Charlie. The Colonel gives him 24 hours, until a new marshal can be designated.

Poised to kill Sacha, Stuart learns that he only saw Legare. Legare tells Jeanne he will have Clay killed if she tells him anything. The cavalry rides out and the town fills with hired guns. Clay figures out that Stuart didn't kill Charlie, and at the Bella Union tells him so. Sacha returns to point the finger at Legare. Clay escorts Legare through the Bella Union at gunpoint. Stuart steps on stage and Jeanne warns Clay. A huge gunfight erupts. Stuart pursues Legare outside. Clay follows both of them into the street, also filled with men shooting. Legare hides in the Alamo's ruins. Stuart kills him, takes the book, and escapes on horseback.

Jeanne leaves for New Orleans thinking that Clay has abandoned her. In fact, he is missing. Cut to Clay in hot pursuit of Stuart, determined to arrest him. Ultimately Stuart dies when he hits his head on a rock during the climactic fist-fight. Clay retrieves the book.

He catches up with Jeanne's coach and climbs aboard. He points to the sad look in the eyes of the cattle nearby. Jeanne—who previously talked about cow's "antlers"—mentions the breed, and admits she was born in Fort Worth. They kiss and the coach turns around.

== Cast ==
- Errol Flynn as Clay Hardin
- Alexis Smith as Jeanne Starr
- S. Z. "Cuddles" Sakall as Sacha Bozic
- Victor Francen as Legare
- Florence Bates as Henrietta
- John Litel as Charlie Bell
- Paul Kelly as Roy Stuart
- Robert Shayne as Captain Morgan
- John Alvin as Pony Smith
- Monte Blue as Cleve Andrews
- Robert Barrat as Colonel Johnson
- Pedro de Cordoba as Ricardo Torreon
- Tom Tyler as Lafe McWilliams

== Production ==
=== Development ===
W. R. Burnett, one of the writers, said Warner Bros had the idea of getting Max Brand to write an Errol Flynn Western. Burnett says "They gave him (Brand) carte blanche, which they never did, because of his enormous reputation. He used to come in every day with a briefcase and go out every night with a briefcase. We found out later he brought in two quarts of gin every day and drank them up-took the empties out."

Burnett says a few months later he got a call from Jim Geller, head of Warners story department, saying they had a shooting date, Flynn, and a color commitment, but Brand had come up with "a very original idea for us. A Western in which there's no action." Geller told Burnett to come up with a story with producer Robert Buckner.

(According to a later article on Brand, the author contributed to the scripts of the Flynn films Uncertain Glory, The Adventures of Don Juan, and Montana before becoming a war correspondent and being killed in May 1944.)

Burnett says he wrote the script in three weeks then rewrote it. He says he pitched Marlene Dietrich for Flynn's co star; Jack Warner was enthusiastic but did not want to pay Dietrich's fee, especially when he had so many other actors under contract.

In March 1944, Warners announced they would make the film from a script by Burnett with Raoul Walsh to direct. It was the third in a series of Westerns Flynn made named after a city, following Dodge City and Virginia City.

In June Warner Brothers announced that Raymond Massey, who had made Santa Fe Trail with Flynn, was going to play the second male lead. He was initially replaced by Zachary Scott, and Alexis Smith was selected as the female lead. By July David Butler had been assigned to direct and Paul Kelly, not Scott, was to play the villain.

Writer W. R. Burnett said when Butler was given the job of directing, "...it scared the hell out of us because he had never made anything but musicals. But he got a good picture out of it."

=== Shooting ===
Shooting started September 1944. The film was shot at Warners' Calabasas Ranch.

Director David Butler said Warners "built probably the longest street that was ever built for a Western at Warners" for the film and "they built it the wrong way."

Butler says he was warned about working with Flynn but "I never met a nicer man in my entire life. He did everything he was told." Butler says Flynn was only drunk once, for a close up, and was always on time.

Actor Hap Hogan died during filming.

"That was a fine, well done picture", said Butler. "We had a lot of fun and Flynn was great."

== Reception ==
=== Box office ===
The film was Flynn's most popular movie of the mid-1940s, earning $3,553,000 domestically and $2,346,000 foreign. It was Warners' third most popular film of the year, after Saratoga Trunk and Night and Day.

=== Critical ===
In 2019, an article in Filmink magazine said, "There is something anonymous about the film – none of the sequences reach the delirious excesses found in the Dodge City trilogy, for instance; it's less silly than anything in those movies but also less memorable."

== Sources ==
- Butler, David (1993). David Butler: A Directors Guild of America Oral History. Scarecrow Press.
- McGilligan, Patrick; Mate, Ken (1986). "W.R. Burnett: The Outsider". In McGilligan, Patrick (ed.). Backstory : interviews with screenwriters of Hollywood's golden age. University of California press. pp. 49–84.
