= Roaring Guns =

1944 film

- Directed by: Jean Negulesco
- Written by: Clements Ripley
- Screenplay by: Ed Earl Repp; Robert Buckner; Warren Duff
- Produced by: Gordon Hollingshead
- Starring: Robert Shayne; Virginia Patton; Mark Stevens
- Narrated by: Art Baker
- Cinematography: Carl E. Guthrie
- Edited by: Doug Gould
- Music by: Howard Jackson
- Production company: Warner Bros.
- Distributed by: Warner Bros.
- Release date: February 19, 1944
- Running time: 19 minutes
- Country: United States
- Language: English

Roaring Guns is a 1944 short American Western film directed by Jean Negulesco and starring Robert Shayne and Virginia Patton. It was written by Clements Ripley, Ed Earl Repp, Robert Buckner and Warren Duff, and depicts hydraulic gold mining which became popular after the initial Gold Rush had ended and the devastating effects on the land from mud and water on local farmers. The 19 minute film uses miniature models for some of the flood scenes. It is considered an early film for the environmental movement.

== Cast ==
- Robert Shayne as Jared Whitney
- Virginia Patton as Karen Ferris
- Mark Stevens as Lance Ferris (as Stephen Richards)
- Charles Arnt as Colonel Chris Ferris
- Norman Willis as Michen, mine foreman
- Russell Simpson as Farmer MacKenzie
