= Stanley Logan =

English film director and actor (1885–1953)

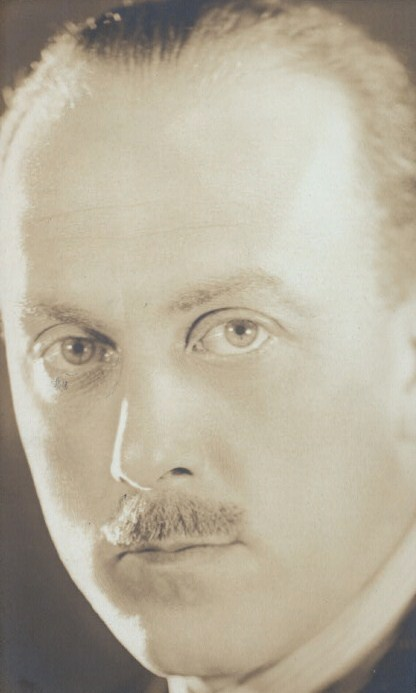
- Logan c.1930
- Born: Stanley William Maurice Logan; 12 June 1885; Earlsfield, Greater London, U.K.
- Died: 30 January 1953 (aged 67); New York City, U.S.
- Occupations: Actor, film director
- Years active: 1918–1952
- Spouses: Alice E. Hirst; Odette Myrtil
- Children: 3

Stanley Logan (born Stanley William Maurice Logan; 12 June 1885 – 30 January 1953) was an English actor, screen writer, theatre director and film director.

== Biography ==
Stanley Logan was born on 12 June 1885 in Earlsfield, Greater London, England as Stanley William Maurice Logan. He died on 30 January 1953 in New York City.

During his life, Logan was married twice: first with Alice E. Hirst and later to vaudeville stage actress Odette Myrtil.

== Filmography ==
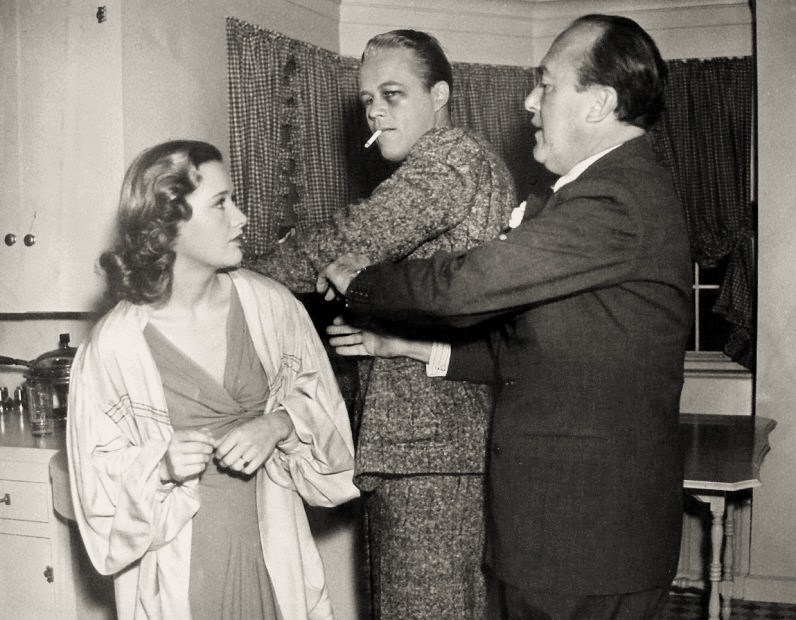
Stanley Logan (right) with Priscilla Lane and Wayne Morris in Love, Honor and Behave (1938)

Year	Title	Role	Notes
1918	What Would a Gentleman Do?	Dickie Hook	
1919	As He Was Born	Felix Delaney	
1937	First Lady		Director
1938	Love, Honor and Behave		Director
1938	Women Are Like That		Director
1939	We Are Not Alone	Sir Guy Lockhead	
1940	My Son, My Son!	The Colonel	
1940	Escape to Glory	Captain James P. Hollister	
1940	Women in War	Col. Starr	
1940	Arise, My Love	Col. Tubbs-Brown	
1940	South of Suez	Prosecutor	
1941	Singapore Woman	Commissioner	
1942	Counter-Espionage	Sir Stafford Hart	
1942	Nightmare	Inspector Robbins	
1942	The Falcon's Brother		Director
1943	Two Tickets to London	Nettleton	Uncredited
1943	The Return of the Vampire	Col. Mosley	Uncredited
1943	Around the World	Commanding Officer	Uncredited
1943	The Spider Woman	Robert	Uncredited
1943	Higher and Higher	Mr. Henry	Uncredited
1944	Wilson	Robert Lansing, Secretary of State	
1946	Three Strangers	'Major' George Alfred Beach	Uncredited
1946	Home Sweet Homicide	Mr. Cherrington	Uncredited
1948	The Challenge	Inspector McIver	
1949	Sword in the Desert	Col. Bruce Evans	
1949	That Forsyte Woman	Swithin Forsyte	
1950	Young Daniel Boone	Col. Benson	
1951	Pride of Maryland	Sir Thomas Asbury	
1951	Tarzan's Peril	Governor	Uncredited
1951	Double Crossbones	Lord Montrose	
1951	The Law and the Lady	Sir Roland Epping	Uncredited
1952	5 Fingers	Member of Parliament	Uncredited
1952	With a Song in My Heart	British Diplomat	Uncredited
1952	Les Misérables	Judge	Uncredited
1952	The Prisoner of Zenda	Lord Topham	Uncredited, (final film role)
