= Sterling Noel =

American journalist and novelist

- Born: 1903; San Francisco
- Died: 1984 (aged 80–81); Paris, Maine
- Occupations: journalist, editor, novelist

Sterling Noel (1903–1984) was an American journalist, newspaper editor and novelist. Born in San Francisco, USA, Noel worked for several newspapers before joining the staff of the Baltimore News-Post in 1956. He became executive editor and continued in that role until his retirement in 1969. Noel was also the author of several spy novels, including I Killed Stalin (1951) and We Who Survived (1959). The films To Paris With Love and House of Secrets are based on stories of his.

== Novels ==
- I Killed Stalin (1951)
- Storm Over Paris (1955)
- We Who Survived (1959)

== Personal life ==
Noel's third marriage was to choreographer and ballet director Catherine Littlefield.
