= Robert Lee Scott Jr. =

Brigadier General in the United States Air Force

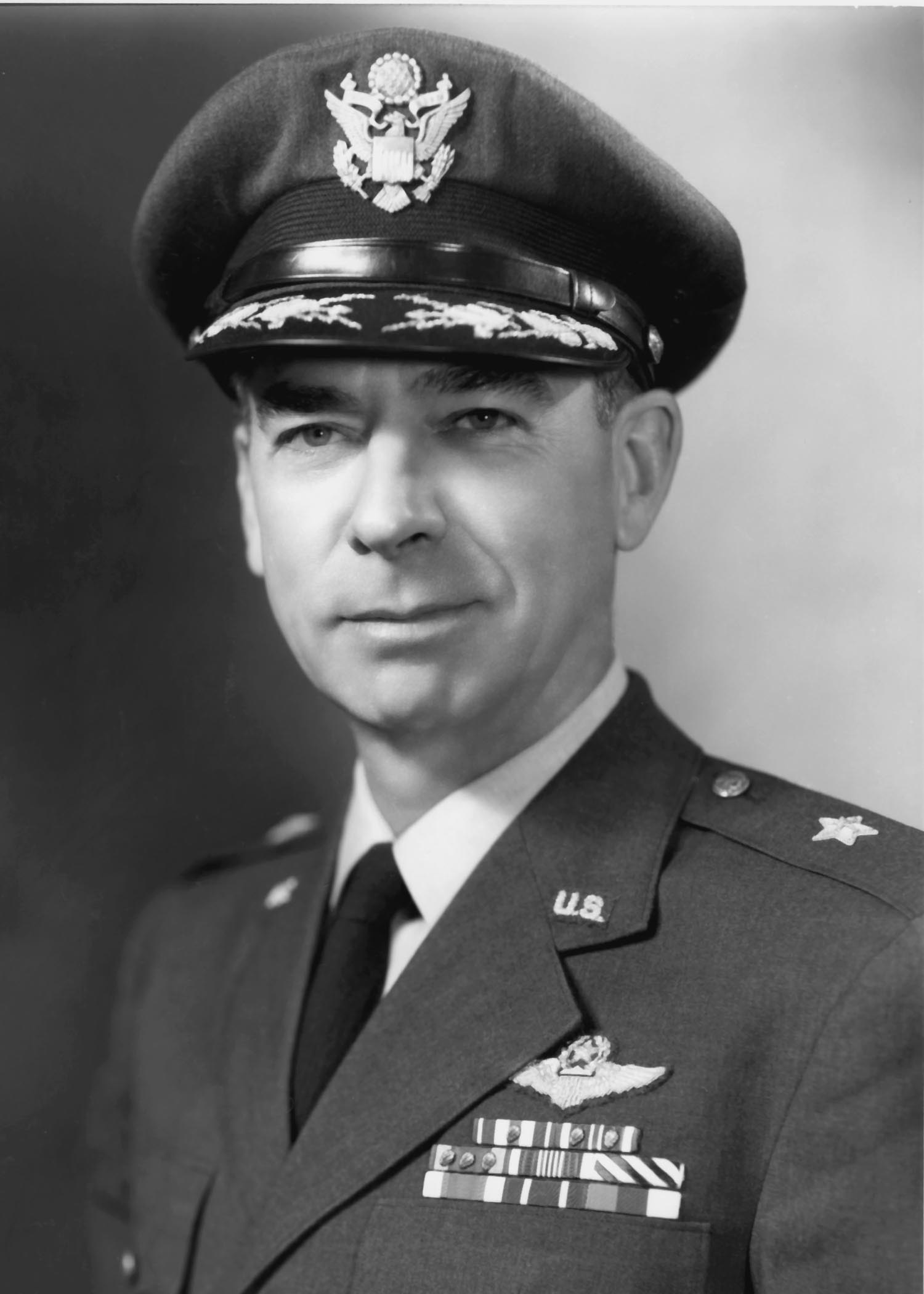
- Photograph of Scott
- Born: 12 April 1908; Waynesboro, Georgia, U.S.
- Died: 27 February 2006 (aged 97); Warner Robins, Georgia, U.S.
- Burial place: Arlington National Cemetery
- Military career
- Allegiance: United States
- Branch: United States Army Air Corps; United States Army Air Forces; United States Air Force
- Service years: 1932–1957
- Rank: Brigadier General
- Nickname: "Scotty"
- Commands: 23rd Fighter Group; 36th Fighter-Bomber Wing; Luke Air Force Base
- Conflicts: World War II
- Awards: Silver Star (2); Distinguished Flying Cross (3); Air Medal (4); Army Commendation Medal
- Other work: Author

Robert Lee Scott Jr. (12 April 1908 – 27 February 2006) was a brigadier general in the United States Air Force and a flying ace of World War II, credited with shooting down 13 Japanese aircraft.

Scott is best known for his memoir, God is My Co-Pilot (1943), about his exploits in World War II with the Flying Tigers and the United States Army Air Forces in China and Burma. The book was adapted as a film of the same name, which was released in 1945.

== Early years ==
Scott was born in Waynesboro, near Augusta, Georgia, the oldest of three children born to Ola and Robert Scott. As a youth, Scott was educated in Macon and became an Eagle Scout, earning the Distinguished Eagle Scout Award. At the age of five, he witnessed the fatal aircraft crash of pioneer aviator Eugene Ely. He received endorsement to attend West Point.

== Military career ==
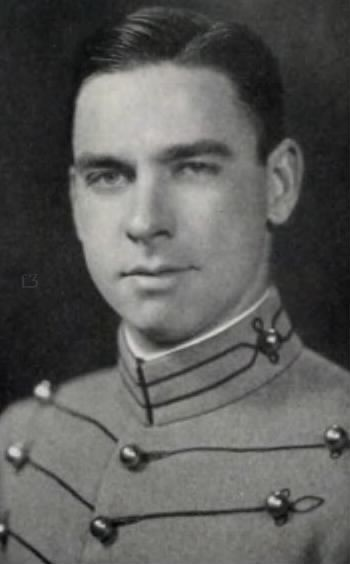
Scott at the United States Military Academy at West Point in 1932

Upon graduation from the United States Military Academy at West Point in 1932, Scott completed pilot training at Kelly Field, Texas. In October 1933, he was assigned to Mitchel Field, New York. Scott flew air mail in 1934, joined a pursuit squadron in Panama, and helped instruct other pilots at bases in Texas and California.

== World War II ==
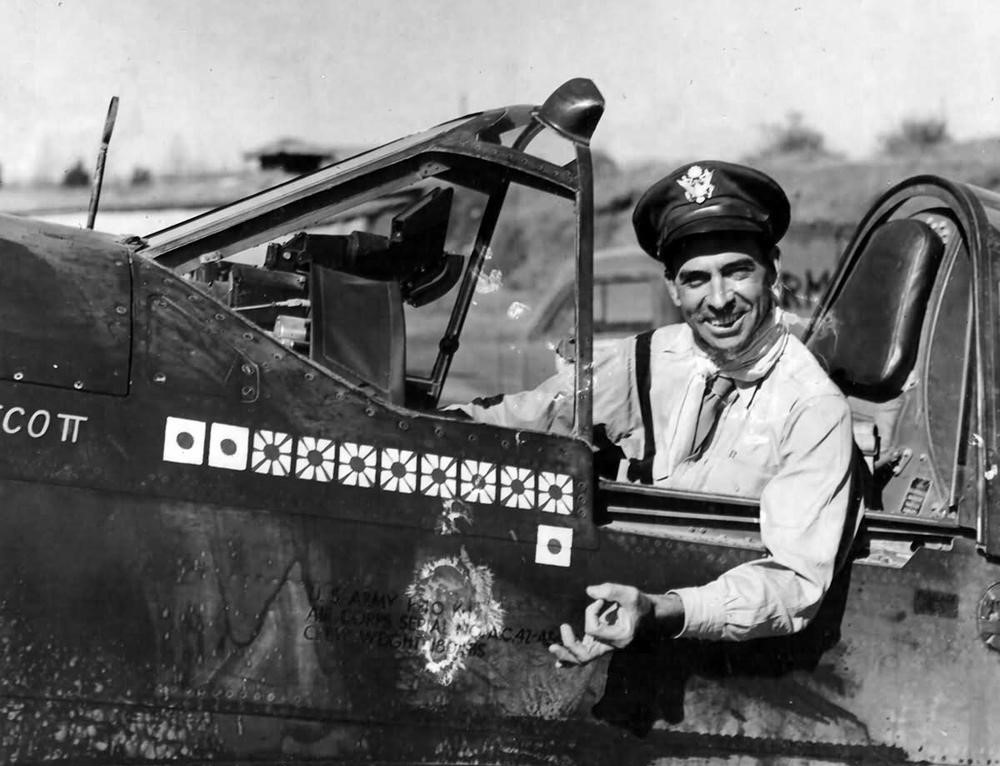
Colonel Robert Lee Scott Jr. in his P-40 Warhawk, 1943

After World War II began, Scott joined Task Force Aquila in February 1942 to fly a group of Boeing B-17 Flying Fortress bombers to the China Burma India Theater, initially as a scheme to bomb Japan. Anxious to join the mission, which was to bomb Japan from China, he professed to be an experienced B-17 pilot. He learned to fly the plane en route to Africa. Upon arrival in India, he found the mission had been cancelled, so he became stuck in India.

Wanting to be on the frontline in flying combat, within a month, he was assigned as executive and operations officer of the Assam-Burma-China (Ferry) Command. This was the forerunner of the famous Air Transport Command, which flew "The Hump" from India to China to supply the Kuomintang government. When the commanding officer left for China on 17 June, Scott was assigned command of the operation for several days.

Still anxious to get into combat and wishing to learn the Flying Tigers' tactics, he obtained the use of a Republic P-43 Lancer, assigned to the Flying Tigers by Claire Chennault. He flew at least one high–altitude mission over Mount Everest, as he described in the opening pages of his 1943 memoir God Is My Co-Pilot. Scott began flying missions with the Flying Tigers, piloting a P-40 as a single ship escort for the transports and on ground attack missions. During this period, he frequently repainted the propeller spinner in different colors to create the illusion of a much larger fighter force in the area than a single aircraft, becoming in effect a "one-man air force."

In July 1942, at the request of Generalissimo Chiang Kai-shek, Scott was named commander of the 23rd Fighter Group, newly formed by General Chennault when the Flying Tigers were incorporated into the United States Army Air Forces. Popular accounts said that Scott inherited command of the Flying Tigers, but that group had disbanded at the conclusion of the pilots' contracts on 30 June. The 23rd Fighter Group later became part of the 14th Air Force.

Colonel Scott flew 388 combat missions in 925 hours from July 1942 to October 1943, shooting down 13 Japanese aircraft, and is noted as one of America's earliest flying aces of the war.

Scott was ordered back to the U.S. in October 1943 to become deputy for operations at the Army Air Force School of Applied Tactics at Orlando Army Air Base, Florida. He had completed his memoir about his combat experience in the Far East, and his book, God Is My Co-Pilot, was published in 1943. The book was adapted as a film by the same name, released in 1945.

He returned to China in 1944 to fly fighter aircraft equipped with experimental rockets directed against Japanese supply locomotives in eastern China. He was transferred to Okinawa to direct the same type of strikes against enemy shipping as the war ended. Besides his book God Is My Co-Pilot, he also published Damned to Glory in 1944, a collection of World War II yarns. One story was that of a pilot named Corn Sherrill who, after the fall of the Philippines in 1941, escaped to the island of Mindanao where he flew a rebuilt P-40 aircraft against the Japanese until he was shot down over China by members of the Flying Tigers. This particular tale was reprinted in Reader's Digest in January 1945 as "Ghost Ship." However, Scott himself admitted he and another pilot had made up the tale as a joke; despite this, it still occasionally turns up as a true story.

== Post-war ==
Scott returned to the U.S. for staff duty in Washington, D.C. and other stations until 1947, when he was given command of the Jet Fighter School at Williams Air Force Base, Arizona. In 1951, he was reassigned to West Germany as commander of the 36th Fighter-Bomber Wing at Fürstenfeldbruck Air Base.

Scott graduated from the National War College in 1954 and was assigned as Deputy Chief of Staff for Plans at Headquarters U.S. Air Force, and then to the position of Director of Information under the Secretary of the Air Force. In October 1956, he was assigned to Luke Air Force Base, Arizona, as base commander.

== Retirement ==
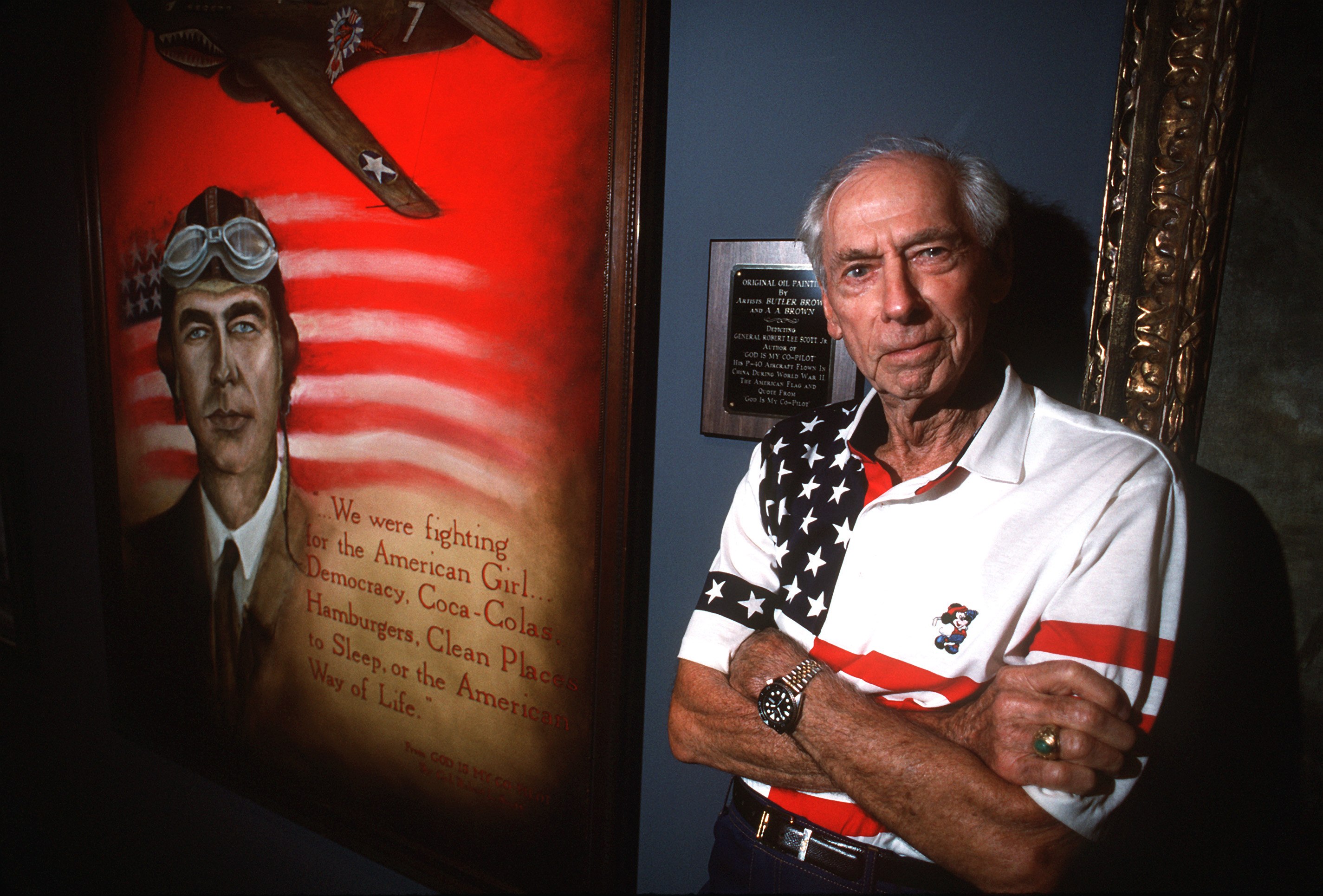
Scott with an oil painting of himself at the Museum of Aviation in Georgia (1994)

Scott retired from the United States Air Force as a brigadier general on 30 September 1957, and remained in Arizona until the 1980s. He lived in Warner Robins, Georgia, until his death in 2006. In total, General Scott wrote about a dozen books including God Is My Co-Pilot and The Day I Owned the Sky.

Scott continued to be active well into his retirement. In 1980, he gained national attention by hiking the length of the Great Wall of China. He had seen portions of the Wall during his 1944 flights near Peking. By 1980 he obtained Chinese government permission to make the 1,900-mile (3050 km) trek, which took 94 days.

In 1984, after passing a flight physical at Luke Air Force Base, Scott was taken up in a General Dynamics F-16C Fighting Falcon from the 310th TFTS. The F-16C was piloted by Col. Richard P. High (Squadron Commander of the 310th TFTS). Scott also flew a McDonnell Douglas F-15 Eagle. On his 89th birthday in 1997, Scott flew in a B-1B Lancer bomber.

Scott died on February 28, 2006, at Warner Robins, Georgia; he was buried with full military honors at Arlington National Cemetery.

== Bibliography ==
- God is my Co-Pilot. New York: Blue Ribbon Books, 1943. OCLC 2949268
- Damned to Glory. New York: Blue Ribbon Books, 1944.
- Runway to the Sun. New York: Charles Scribner's Sons, 1945. OCLC 1372996
- Between the Elephant's Eyes. New York: Dodd Mead, 1954. OCLC 1353466 Reissued Ballantine Books, 1954.
- Look of the Eagle. New York: Dodd Mead, 1955.
- Samburu the Elephant. New York: Dodd, Mead, 1957.
- Tiger in the Sky. New York: Ballantine Books, 1959. OCLC 11093976
- Boring a Hole in the Sky: Six Million Miles with a Fighter Pilot. New York: Random House, 1961. OCLC 1376425
- God is Still My Co-Pilot. Garden City, N.Y., Blue Ribbon Books, 1947. OCLC 29371504 Periodically reissued by other publishers.
- Flying Tiger: Chennault of China. Westport, Connecticut: Greenwood Press, 1973. ISBN 0-8371-6774-4 Previously issued in 1959 by Doubleday. OCLC 411081
- "To Walk the Great Wall". Reader's Digest, April 1983
- The Day I Owned the Sky. New York: Bantam Books, 1989. ISBN 0-553-27507-0

== Awards and honors ==
For his combat record in World War II, Scott received:

USAF Command Pilot badge
Silver Star w/ 1 bronze oak leaf cluster
| Distinguished Flying Cross w/ 2 bronze oak leaf clusters | Air Medal w/ 3 bronze oak leaf clusters | Army Commendation Medal |
| American Defense Service Medal | American Campaign Medal | Asiatic-Pacific Campaign Medal w/ 1 silver campaign star |
| World War II Victory Medal | Army of Occupation Medal | National Defense Service Medal |
| Air Force Longevity Service Award w/ 1 silver oak leaf cluster | Distinguished Flying Cross (United Kingdom) | Army, Navy & Air Force Medal; A1 (Republic of China) |
| Order of the Sacred Tripod; 6th Grade (Republic of China) | Order of the Cloud and Banner; 4th Grade (Republic of China) | China War Memorial Medal (Republic of China) |

During the 1996 Summer Olympics in Atlanta, Georgia, Scott carried the Olympic Flame along a section of Georgia State Route 247, which had been named in his honor. In 1989 he was in the first class of inductees to the Georgia Aviation Hall of Fame.

== Gallery ==
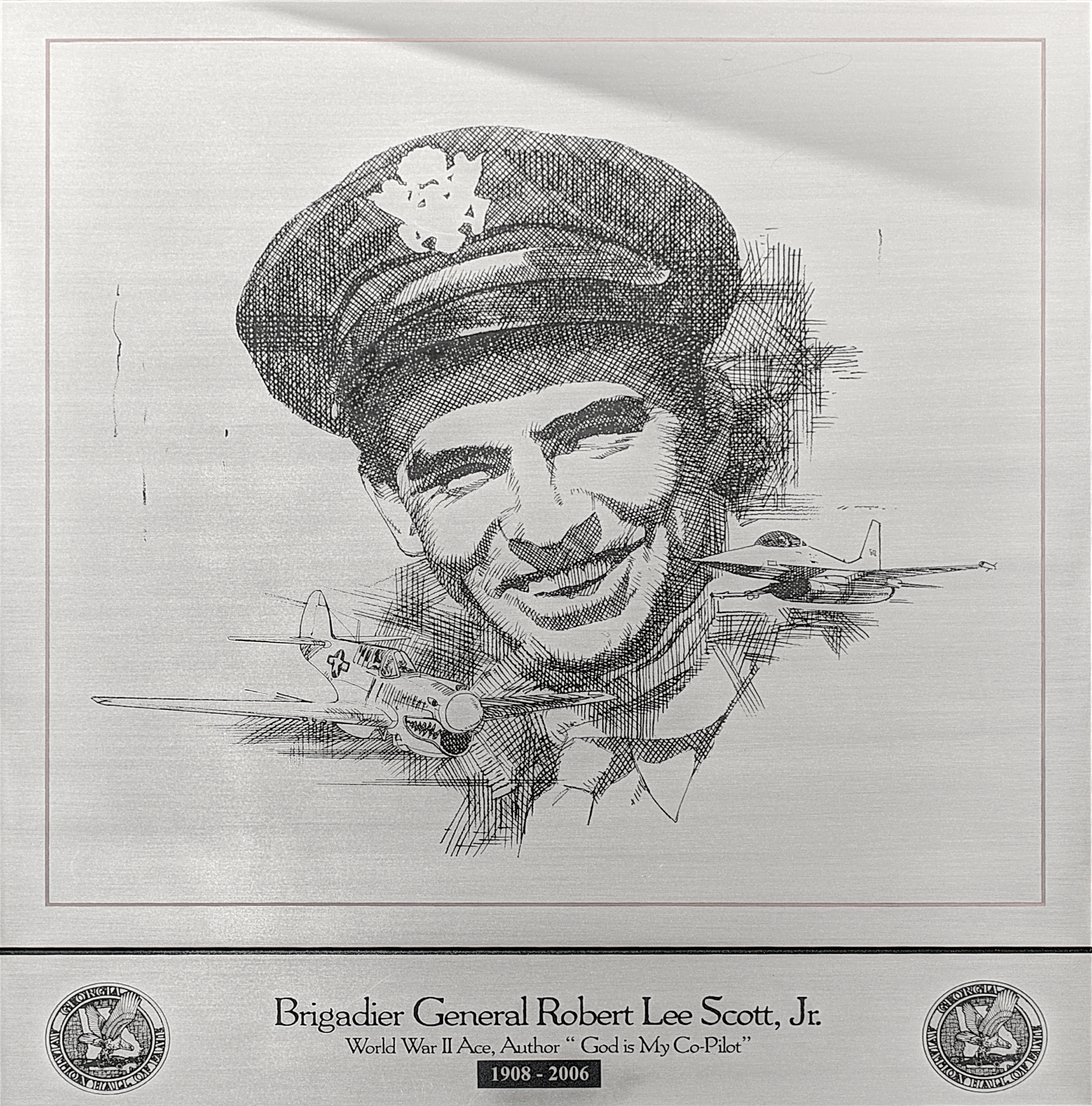
Plaque of Scott at the Georgia Aviation Hall of Fame

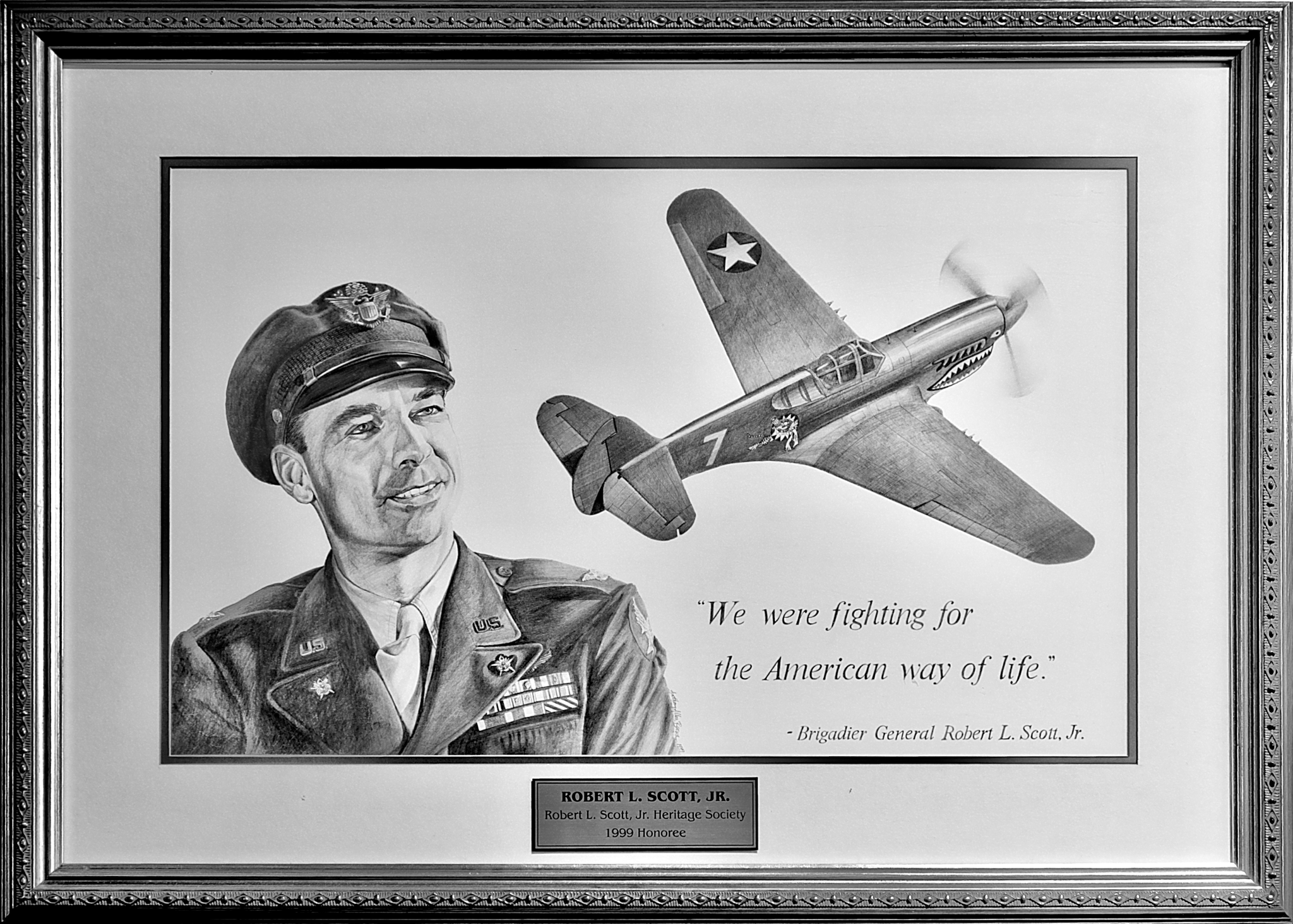
Painting of Scott at the Museum of Aviation

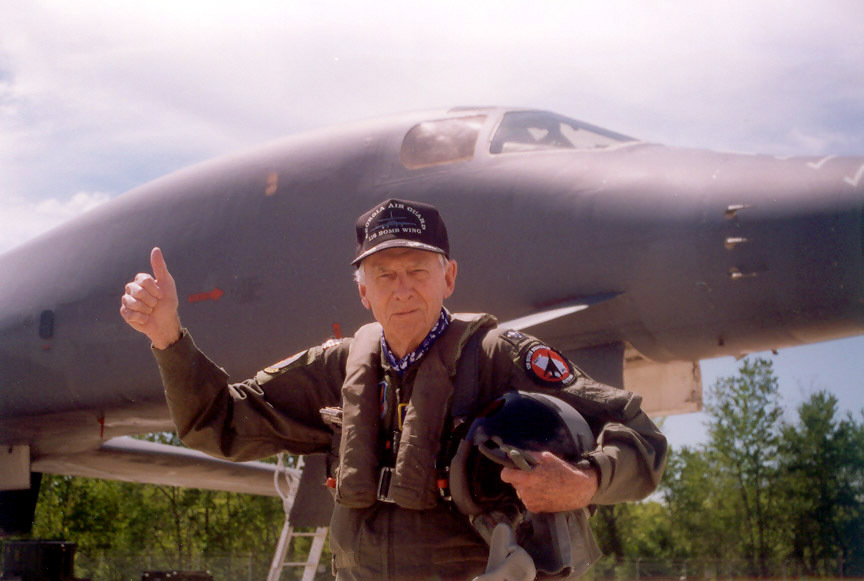
Brigadier General Scott after his B-1 flight in 1997

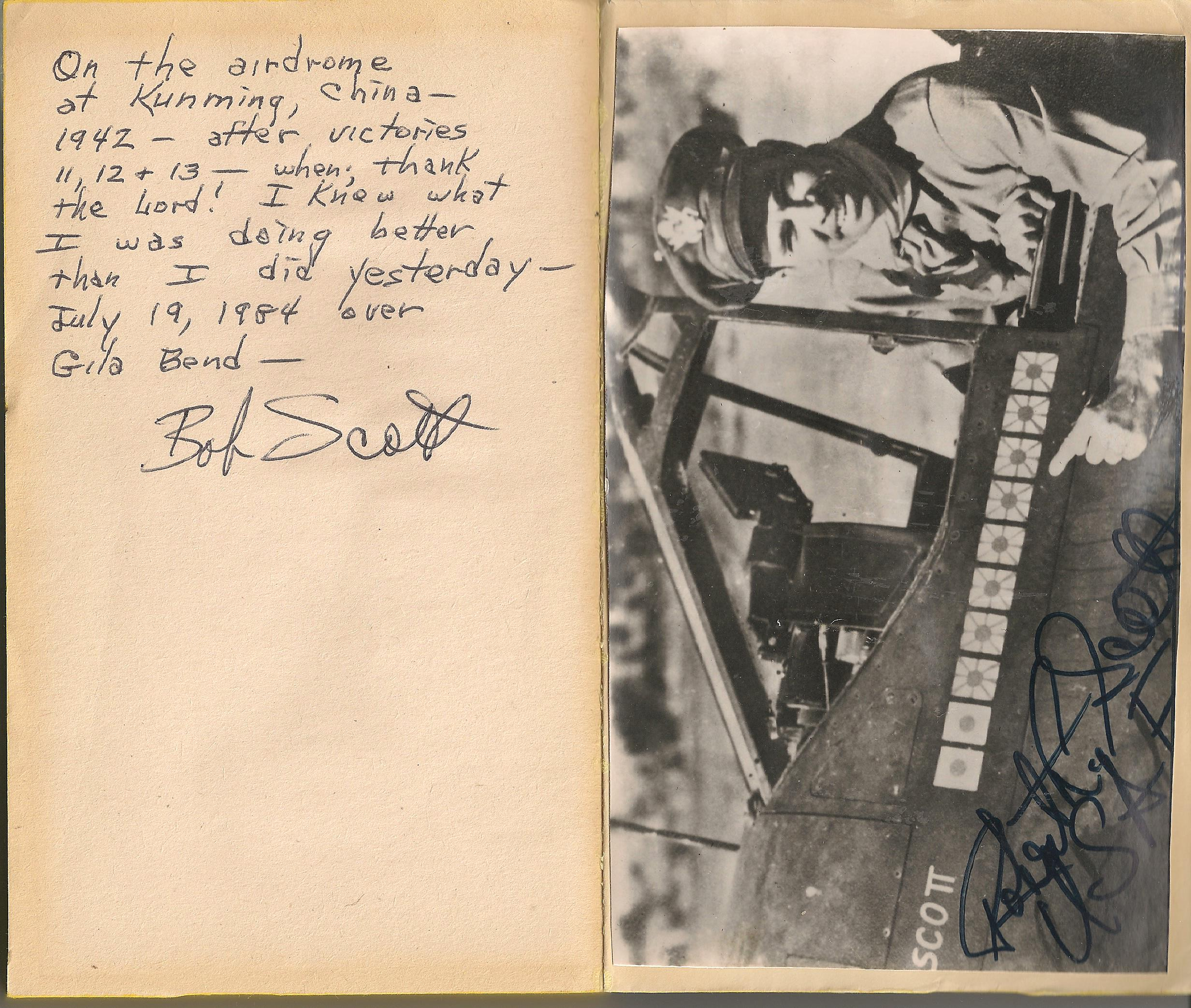
Inscription and photo on the back cover of the God is My Co-Pilot and a photo of Bob Scott in his P-40 after his 11, 12, and 13 kills.

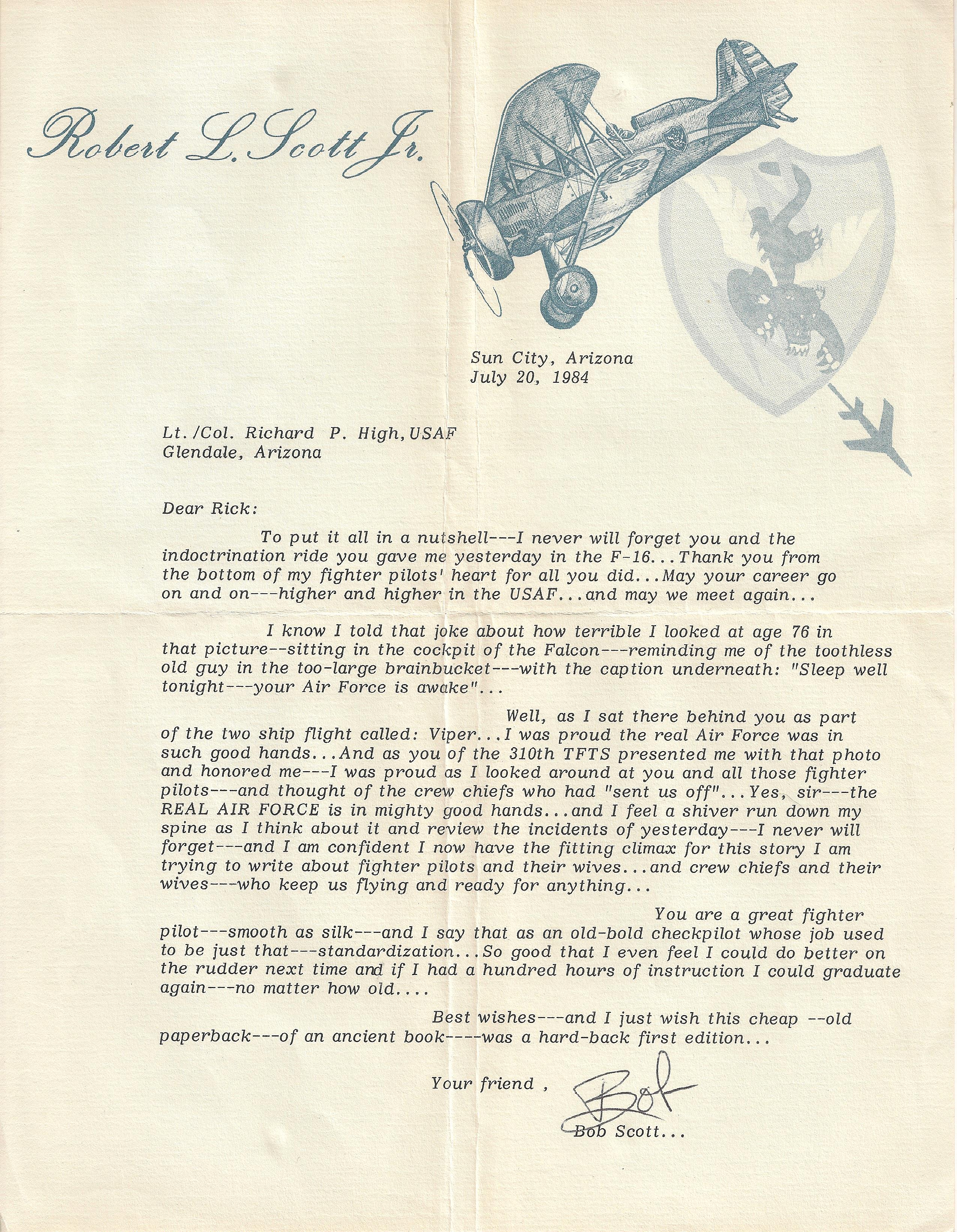
Letter of appreciation to Lt. Col. Richard High Squadron Commander of the 310th Tactical Fighter Training Squadron, after a flight in an F-16C on 19 July 1984.

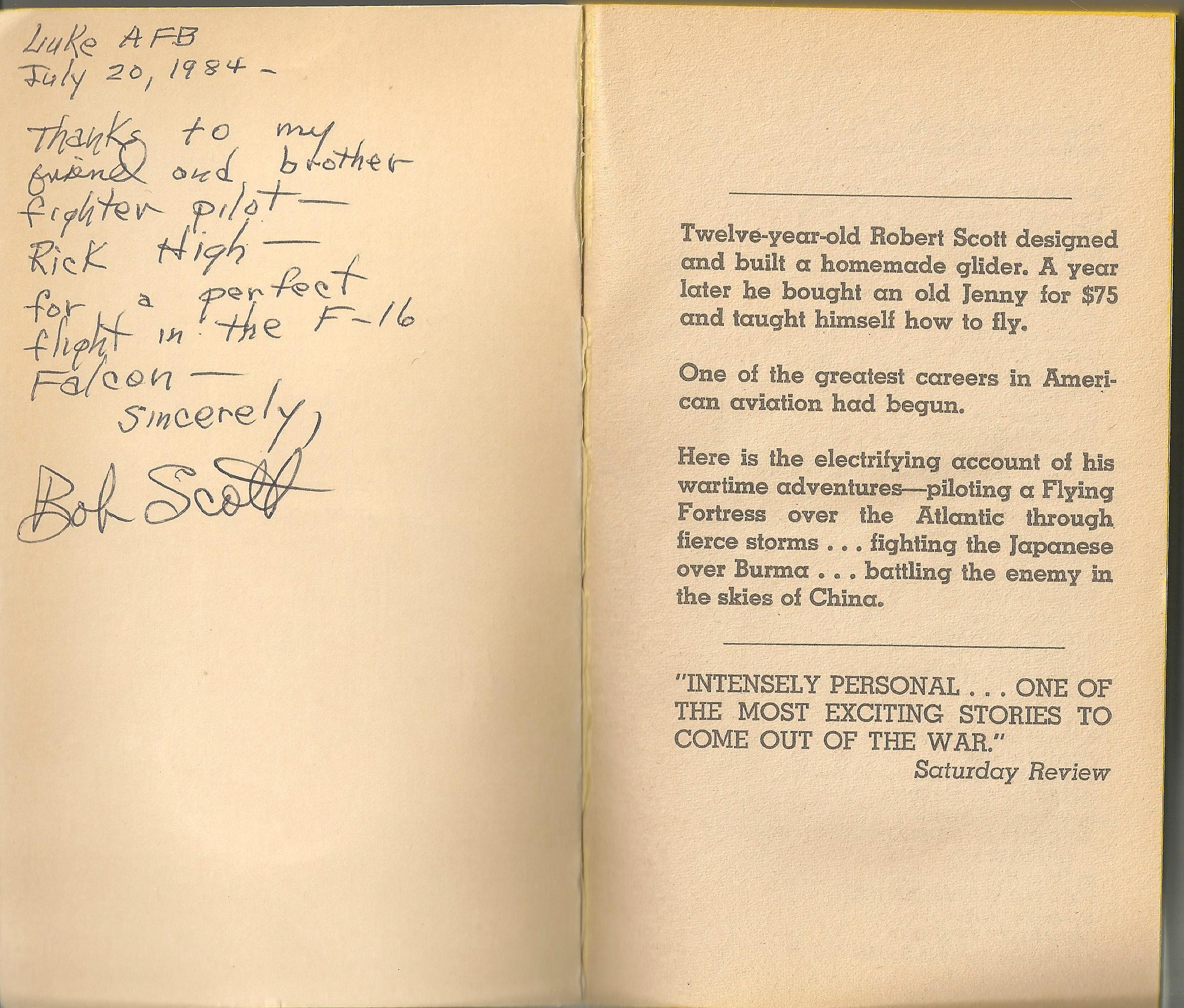
Inscription on the inside cover of God is My Co-Pilot to Lt. Col. Richard High.
