= House of Secrets (1956 film) =

1956 British film directed by Guy Green

- UK theatrical poster
- Directed by: Guy Green
- Written by: Robert Buckner; Bryan Forbes
- Based on: novel Storm Over Paris by Sterling Noel
- Produced by: Vivian Cox; Julian Wintle
- Starring: Michael Craig; Anton Diffring; Gérard Oury
- Cinematography: Harry Waxman
- Edited by: Sidney Hayers
- Music by: Hubert Clifford
- Production company: Rank Films
- Distributed by: Rank Film Distributors
- Release date: 23 October 1956 (UK)
- Running time: 85 minutes
- Country: United Kingdom
- Language: English

House of Secrets, also known as Triple Deception, is a 1956 British crime thriller film directed by Guy Green and starring Michael Craig, Anton Diffring and Gérard Oury. It was written by Robert Buckner and Bryan Forbes based on the 1955 novel Storm Over Paris by Sterling Noel.

== Plot ==
Merchant navy officer Larry Ellis bears a striking resemblance to counterfeiter Steve Chancellor and is mistakenly arrested in his place. Chancellor is killed in a car crash and Ellis goes undercover to impersonate the dead man, to lead the police to his gang who plan to inundate the UK with huge amounts of forged bank notes.

Ellis devises a plan for smuggling the counterfeit notes into England, but his impersonation is rumbled. The plane he is travelling on with the money (which has been replaced by plain paper) is rigged to explode, but he bales out in time.

== Cast ==
- Michael Craig as Larry Ellis / Steve Chancellor
- Anton Diffring as Anton Lauderbach
- Gérard Oury as Julius Pindar
- Brenda De Banzie as Madame Isabella Ballu
- Geoffrey Keen as Colonel Burleigh, CIA
- David Kossoff as Henryk van de Heide, CIA
- Barbara Bates as Judy Anderson
- Alan Tilvern as Brandelli
- Julia Arnall as Diane Gilbert
- Gordon Tanner as Curtice
- Eugene Deckers as Vidal
- Eric Pohlmann as Gratz
- Jean Driant as Gratz's assistant (uncredited)
- Carl Jaffe as Walter Dorffman

== Production ==
The movie was one of several thrillers made by Rank that year.

It was shot in Technicolor and VistaVision at Pinewood Studios near London and on location in Paris and Marseille. Filming took eight weeks, starting April 1956, half on location, half at Pinewood.

The film's sets were designed by the art director Alex Vetchinsky, and the costumes by Julie Harris.

Michael Craig had appeared in Passage Home, Yield to the Night and Eyewitness and this was his first leading role. He called his role "a huge part, with various leading ladies, love scenes and fights, and all that idiot stuff." In his memoirs, Craig called the film "a sort of forerunner to the James Bond type of movie" which "in spite of all our best efforts it ended up being fairly boring." He was paid £30 a week.

Julia Arnall had just appeared in Lost for Rank and Barbara Bates had come in from Hollywood.

== Critical reception ==
The Daily Telegraph wrote that it was "good for some thrills".

The Guardian called it "the best British thriller of the more extrovert sort for many a month."

Variety wrote; "there are plenty of thrills and mounting tension In this workmanlike adaptation... Like most stories taken from books, the plot tends to become over-involved... Exciting entertainment that nears, but never bridges the borderline of credulity."

The Monthly Film Bulletin wrote: "A somewhat juvenile spy story with attractive and well chosen Parisian backgrounds. The police, wise and mannerly, and the crooks, suave and heavily accented, give the impression of having been faithfully transcribed from the pages of The Skipper and Rover. The acting, particularly of the foreigners, is also solidly traditional; the photography and art direction, on the other hand, are often distinctly above average."

Kine Weekly wrote: "Michael Craig great as two-fisted hero, support first-class, highlights rugged and staging and photography impeccable."

In British Sound Films: The Studio Years 1928–1959 David Quinlan rated the film as "average", writing: "Thick-ear Boys' Own-style thriller with limited acting but good fight scenes and photography."

The Radio Times Guide to Films gave the film 2/5 stars, writing: "A box-office sleeper in its day, this patchy thriller will probably seem threadbare to modern audiences, but director Guy Green uses Paris locations well and keeps the story ticking along. Groomed by Rank as the successor to Dirk Bogarde, Michael Craig never quite lived up to the hype. However, as a naval officer impersonating his counterfeiting lookalike, he holds his own."
