= Black Moon (1934 film) =

1934 American horror film by Roy William Neill

- Directed by: Roy William Neill
- Screenplay by: Wells Root
- Based on: Black Moon by Clements Ripley
- Produced by: Harry Cohn
- Starring: Jack Holt; Fay Wray; Dorothy Burgess
- Cinematography: Joseph August
- Edited by: Richard Cahoon
- Production company: Columbia Pictures Corp.
- Distributed by: Columbia Pictures Corp.
- Release date: 15 June 1934
- Running time: 68 minutes
- Country: United States
- Language: English

Black Moon is a 1934 American pre-Code horror film directed by Roy William Neill and starring Jack Holt, Fay Wray, and Dorothy Burgess. It is based on a short story by Clements Ripley that first appeared in Hearst's International-Cosmopolitan. The film centers on a young woman who returns to the tropical island where her parents were murdered during a voodoo ritual with her daughter and nanny, only to become corrupted by the native's dark rituals.

== Plot ==
A young girl, Juanita, finds her parents killed in a voodoo ritual on a distant tropical island. She escapes with her life, but when she reaches adulthood, she feels compelled to return to the island, bringing her daughter and a nanny who takes care of the child. Once there, she goes to stay with her uncle who lives on the island. She soon discovers that the natives, who had been using her for voodoo rituals when she was a child, now treat her as a voodoo goddess. In this role, she begins leading their rituals.

Any attempt to fight Juanita's influence or to remove her from her position is met with violent force. One person is found dead in a lava pit, while another is found hanged. At one point, Juanita is so overcome by the voodoo curse that she offers her daughter up for sacrifice. Juanita's businessman husband, Stephen, follows her to the island and attempts to travel into the jungle to rescue her, but finds her taking part in a sacrifice of an innocent woman. Although he shoots the high priest of the tribe, Juanita completes the sacrifice herself.

Their high priest injured, the natives now plan to murder all of the white people on the island. Stephen takes his daughter and two others into the fortified section of a plantation house. The natives succeed in capturing Stephen and his secretary, Gail, but they are eventually rescued. In the end, Stephen shoots and kills Juanita just as she is about to sacrifice her own daughter.

== Cast ==
Cast adapted from the book Columbia Pictures Horror, Science Fiction and Fantasy Films.

- Jack Holt as Stephen Lane
- Fay Wray as Gail Hamilton
- Dorothy Burgess as Juanita Perez Lane
- Cora Sue Collins as Nancy Lane
- Arnold Korff as Dr. Raymond Perez
- Clarence Muse as Lunch McClaren
- Madame Sul-Te-Wan as Ruva
- Lumsden Hare as Macklin
- Laurence Criner, as high priest Kala

== Production ==
Black Moon was based on the novel by Clements Ripley which first appeared in Hearst's International-Cosmopolitan. Among the cast was Jack Holt, who was one of Columbia Pictures' most popular actors of the period and would continue to headline their pictures up until the early 1940s. The director, Roy William Neill had been directing films since 1916 and joined Columbia in 1930, where he directed the studios films The Menace, The Ninth Guest (1934) and The Black Room (1935).

The film began production on April 10, 1934, and finished on May 3, 1934.

== Release ==
Black Moon was released on June 15, 1934. It was distributed by Columbia Pictures Corp. The film was rejected by the British Board of Film Censors and remained unrated in the country until 2024, when it was passed with a 12 certificate.

A Blu-Ray of both the black and white film and a version with colour-tinted scenes (green for the jungle, orange for the evening etc.) has been released by Imprint in the US and in the Columbia Horror boxset from Powerhouse/Indicator in the UK.

== Reception ==
From contemporary reviews, A.D.S. of The New York Times commented that the film was "strictly studio-made, is admirably equipped to throw a double-barrelled scare into the innocent entertainment-hunter." while stating that "There are times when the reassuring Hollywood touch appears in the picture. For example, the native ritual which precedes the main or throat-cutting event has a precision in the dance routines and mass singing that suggests the Busby Berkeley touch." A reviewer in Variety commented that direction in Black Moon was "commendable and the acting is good, but the scenario possesses dubious elements"
