= Robert Buckner =

American film producer (1906–1989)

- Born: May 28, 1906; Crewe, Virginia, United States
- Died: August 18, 1989 (aged 83); San Miguel de Allende, Mexico
- Occupation: Writer

Robert Buckner (May 28, 1906 – August 18, 1989) was an American film screenwriter, playwright, producer and short story writer.

== Biography ==
Buckner studied at the University of Virginia and the University of Edinburgh. He began his professional writing career at age 20, as London correspondent for the New York World.

He wrote a play An Affair of the State; the novels Sigrid and Sergeant (1959), Tiger By the Tail (1960) and Starfire (1960); and the short story "The Man Who Won the War" (1936). His play The Primrose Path played on Broadway in 1939.

=== Screenwriter ===
Buckner joined Warner Bros as a writer. His first credit was Gold Is Where You Find It (1938). He did some uncredited work on Jezebel (1938) and wrote Love, Honor and Behave (1938), Comet Over Broadway (1939), The Oklahoma Kid (1939), and You Can't Get Away with Murder (1939).

Buckner had a big hit with Dodge City (1939) starring Errol Flynn, based on his original screenplay. He was credited on Angels Wash Their Faces (1939), and Espionage Agent (1939) was based on his story.

Buckner wrote a follow-up to Dodge City, Virginia City (1940) with Flynn, and worked on the script for My Love Came Back (1940).

Buckner received acclaim for a biopic, Knute Rockne All American (1940). He did a third Western for Flynn, Santa Fe Trail (1940) and was put on a war film for Flynn, Dive Bomber (1941).

Buckner had a huge success with his script for Yankee Doodle Dandy (1942) a biopic of George M Cohan. This resulted in Bucker being promoted to producer at Warners.

=== Producer ===
Buckner's first film as producer was Gentleman Jim (1942) a biopic of James J. Corbett starring Flynn. He produced Mission to Moscow (1943) a biopic of Joseph E Davies and wrote and produced The Desert Song (1943).

Buckner made another movie with Flynn, Uncertain Glory (1944). He made God Is My Co-Pilot (1945), and wrote and produced Confidential Agent (1945) with Charles Boyer.

Buckner produced a popular Western with Flynn, San Antonio (1945). He did a biopic of the Brontë family, Devotion (1946), and did a crime drama, Nobody Lives Forever (1946).

Buckner produced a Western, Cheyenne (1947), and the prestigious stage hit Life with Father (1947).

In June 1947 Buckner left Warner Bros for Universal.

=== Universal ===
Buckner's first film at Universal was Rogues' Regiment (1948), which he wrote and produced, from a story by Buckner and director Robert Florey.

He went on to wrote and produce Sword in the Desert (1948), based on an old story of Buckner's which he had turned into a novel called Night Watch. It helped make a star of Jeff Chandler.

He wrote and produced Free for All (1949), Deported (1950), shot in Italy with Chandler, and Bright Victory (1951).

=== Freelance writer ===
Buckner provided the story for When in Rome (1952) and The Man Behind the Gun (1953). He went to England to write To Paris with Love (1955), House of Secrets (1956) and two for Warwick Films, A Prize of Gold (1956) and Safari (1956).

Buckner began writing for TV, adapting Twentieth Century and A Bell for Adano for Ford Star Jubilee.

=== 20th Century Fox ===
Back in Hollywood Buckner wrote Love Me Tender (1956) at 20th Century Fox, a film best remembered as Elvis Presley's debut movie. In 1957 he wrote Sigrid and the Sergeant, his first prose in almost twenty years. The following year he wrote and produced From Hell to Texas (1958) directed by Henry Hathaway at Fox.

Also for Fox Bucker created a TV series Hong Kong (1960–61) starring Rod Taylor. It only lasted a season, Bucker produced the pilot for a follow up, Dateline: San Francisco but it did not result in a regular series.

At Disney, his 1960 novel Starfire provided the story for Moon Pilot (1962).

Buckner went on to write episodes of The Rogues, Burke's Law, The Wackiest Ship in the Army, The Name of the Game and Bonanza. He also wrote the features Return of the Gunfighter (1967).

=== Later life ===
In his later life, Buckner lived in San Miguel de Allende, Mexico. He was an artist and recognized leader in the art community there. He died and was buried in San Miguel in 1989.

== Works ==
- "The Man Who Won the War", 1936 (short story)
- Gold Is Where You Find It (1938) – writer
- Jezebel (1938) – uncredited writer
- Love, Honor and Behave (1938) – writer
- Comet Over Broadway (1938) – writer
- The Oklahoma Kid (1939) – writer
- Espionage Agent (1939) – writer
- The Angels Wash Their Faces (1939) – writer
- Dodge City (1939) – writer
- You Can't Get Away with Murder (1939) – writer
- Santa Fe Trail (1940) – writer
- Knute Rockne All American (1940) – writer
- My Love Came Back (1940) – writer
- Virginia City (1940) – writer
- Dive Bomber (1941) – writer
- Yankee Doodle Dandy (1942) – writer
- Gentleman Jim (1942) – producer
- Mission to Moscow (1943) – producer
- The Desert Song (1943) – writer, producer
- Roaring Guns (1944) (short) – writer
- Uncertain Glory (1944) – producer
- God is My Co-Pilot (1945) – producer
- San Antonio (1945) – producer
- Confidential Agent (1945) – writer, producer
- Devotion (1946) – producer
- Nobody Lives Forever (1946) – producer
- Night Watch (1947) (novel) – writer – became Sword in the Desert
- Cheyenne (1947) – producer
- Life with Father (1947) – producer
- Rogues' Regiment (1948) – writer, producer, co-story
- Portrait of a Lady (1949) (play) – writer
- Sword in the Desert (1949) – writer, producer
- Free for All (1949) – writer, producer
- Deported (1950) – writer, producer
- Bright Victory (1951) – writer, producer
- When in Rome (1952) – writer
- The Man Behind the Gun (1953) – writer
- A Prize of Gold (1955) – writer
- To Paris with Love (1955) – writer
- Ford Star Jubilee (1956) – various episodes – writer
- Safari (1956) – writer
- Love Me Tender (1956) – writer
- Triple Deception (1956) – writer
- Sigrid and the Sergeant (1957) (novel) – writer
- From Hell to Texas (1958) – writer, producer
- Hong Kong (1960–61) – creator, writer, producer
- Dateline San Francisco (1962) (TV pilot) – writer
- Moon Pilot (1962) – writer, based on his 1960 novel Starfire
- The Rogues (1965) – various episodes – writer
- Burke's Law (1965) (TV series) – various episodes – writer
- The Wackiest Ship in the Army (1966) – episode "The Lamb Who Hunted Wolves" – writer
- Return of the Gunfighter (1967) – writer
- The Name of the Game (1969) – episode "The Suntan Mob" – writer
- Bonanza (1970) – episode "The Gold Mine" - writer
