= The Ugly Duckling (1959 film) =

British science fiction comedy by Lance Comfort

- British quad poster
- Directed by: Lance Comfort
- Screenplay by: Sid Colin; Jack Davies
- Story by: story by Sid Colin
- Produced by: Michael Carreras; Tommy Lyndon-Haynes
- Starring: Bernard Bresslaw; Jon Pertwee; Reginald Beckwith; Michael Ripper
- Cinematography: Michael Reed; Len Harris
- Edited by: John Dunsford
- Music by: Douglas Gamley
- Color process: Black and white
- Production company: Hammer Film Productions
- Distributed by: Columbia Pictures
- Release date: 10 August 1959; (UK)
- Running time: 84 minutes
- Country: United Kingdom
- Language: English
- Budget: £110,000

The Ugly Duckling is a 1959 British science fiction comedy film, directed by Lance Comfort and starring Bernard Bresslaw, Jon Pertwee and Reginald Beckwith. The screenplay was by Sid Colin and Jack Davies. The film is a comic adaptation of Robert Louis Stevenson's 1886 Dr. Jekyll and Mr. Hyde storyline and the opening credits include "with ideas stolen from Robert Louis Stevenson". The film has no connection to the Hans Christian Andersen story. The tagline on posters read "He's a changed man after taking Jekyll's family remedy." Around this time, Hammer announced they were also producing a straight version of the Jekyll-Hyde theme in the near future to be called The Two Faces of Dr. Jekyll.

John Peverall, Hugh Harlow and Tom Walls were assistant directors, Bernard Robinson and Don Mingaye were the Art Directors, and Roy Ashton did Makeup. The film's working title was Mad Pashernate Love, and it was filmed from May 4 to June 10, 1959. It was trade shown on July 28, 1959, at the Columbia Theatre, and was released in the UK on Aug. 10, 1959.

== Plot ==
Joe Loss and his Orchestra are playing at a dance. Joe Loss then introduces the Henrietta Jekyll Old Time Dance Team and her brother Henry Jekyll, who is a rather incompetent last-minute stand-in. They give a display of formation ballroom dancing with their brother Victor Jekyll taking over the conducting, but Henry turns it into a disaster, much to his sister's dismay.

Henry is a bungling, awkward and socially inept man. He is working in his brother's pharmacy, which is still named after their great-great-grandfather: "Dr Henry Jekyll M.D. – Pharmacy, Estabd. 1812". Victor and Henrietta discuss their worries about Henry as he goes to bed with his golliwog.

Reginald Bannister comes to woo Henrietta but suggests that Henry should be kept out of the way if they marry. Henry is in the pharmacy lab when his elfin young female friend Snouty appears and accuses him of being a square. Luckily they are both in the rear yard when the lab explodes. The explosion reveals a small metal box containing a scroll. The scroll contains an old formula created by Dr Jekyll in the 19th century which claims to turn "a man of timid disposition into a bold, fearless dragon". He eagerly mixes the formula, takes one drink, and is transformed into the suave, dashing and self-confident Teddy Hyde, who makes a big impression at the local dance hall and with the ladies. He encounters Victor at the bar but is unrecognised, and belittles Victor by pouring a drink down the front of his trousers. This draws attention to the crooks who own the dance hall. They are initially going to throw him out but he impresses the boss, Dandy, with his bravado and he recruits him for a robbery he has planned. Teddy leaves just as the potion wears off and Henry wakes in his bed with a bad headache, and his only memory of the events of the previous night is that he thinks it was a dream.

Later, Henry accidentally drinks the formula again, and Teddy leaves to join up with Dandy for the robbery. When Snouty tells Victor that the person at the dance hall was called Hyde, he immediately understands the connection from the family history and realises something must be done. Meanwhile, Teddy breaks into a house through a rooflight and cracks a safe to steal some very valuable jewels. As he and Dandy leave, they separate to avoid a policeman, but the formula wears off and when Dandy draws up to pick him up he does not recognise him, so Henry is unwittingly left with the jewels.

Next morning, when Victor and Snouty see Henry, who again has a bad headache and cannot remember where he was last night, they question him and are shocked to find the jewels still in his pocket. Having decided to return them, Snouty gets into Dandy's office to try to find where the jewels are from, but she is caught by the gang and reveals that Henry plans to return the jewels.

With Victor's help, Henry then starts to remember being Hyde and together they try to replace the jewels before they are missed, but they barge in on a special event to show off the jewels, which Henrietta and Reginald are attending. Dandy and a sidekick are also there to make another attempt at getting the jewels. Victor and Henry struggle on the roof due to their fear of heights. Meanwhile, the police and show organisers find the jewels are missing. Victor and Henry eventually get in and find the still-open safe and return the jewels. The police then return and see the jewels and the show continues as intended. Dandy in the audience realises the jewels are back, so he and his accomplice pull guns to steal the jewels. Snouty convinces Henry that he can do anything Hyde can do and he takes on the armed Dandy. Victor has hidden behind Dandy and knocks him out before he can fire on Henry.

Later, at a special event at the dance hall in honour of Henry, he and Snouty (in a dress) dance for the first time.

== Cast ==
- Bernard Bresslaw as Henry Jekyll / Teddy Hyde
- Jon Pertwee as Victor Jekyll
- Reginald Beckwith as Reginald Bannister
- Maudie Edwards as Henrietta Jekyll
- Jean Muir as Snouty
- Richard Wattis as Inspector Barclay
- Elwyn Brook-Jones as Dandy
- Michael Ripper as Fish
- Harold Goodwin as Benny
- David Lodge as Peewee
- Keith Smith as Figures
- Michael Ward as Mark Pasco
- John Harvey as Sgt. Barnes
- Jess Conrad as Bimbo
- Norma Marla as Angel
- Jean Driant as Monsieur Blum
- Verne Morgan as the barman
- Robert Desmond as Dizzy
- Roger Avon as reporter
- Cyril Chamberlain as Police Sergeant
- Joe Loss as himself
- Ian Wilson as small man (uncredited)

== Production ==
Filming took place at Bray Studios in Berkshire. It was not a success at the box office, losing £20,000. Hammer apparently misplaced the negative on this film, as it is one of the only Hammer films from this period that is not available on home video. A brief extract from James Bernard's theme to Dracula (1958) (also made for Hammer Films) is played whenever Jekyll drinks the potion.

== Critical reception ==
The Monthly Film Bulletin wrote: "Kicking off well with some unabashed slapstick in a dance hall and containing, towards the end, another piece of nonsense with Bresslaw and Jon Pertwee negotiating a girder across a chasm, the film is otherwise only intermittently and moderately amusing. Bernard Bresslaw performs well enough within his limited range and is supported by a carefully chosen cast but, whatever the possibilities of a Jekyll and Hyde skit, the script barely starts to explore them."

In British Sound Films: The Studio Years 1928–1959 David Quinlan rated the film as "average", writing: "Comedy fails to build on its original good idea."

TV Guide gave the film two out of five stars and wrote, "This attempt at comedy never really pays off."
