= Free for All (film) =

1949 film by Charles Barton

- Directed by: Charles Barton
- Screenplay by: Robert Buckner
- Story by: Herbert Clyde Lewis
- Produced by: Robert Buckner
- Starring: Robert Cummings; Ann Blyth; Percy Kilbride
- Cinematography: George Robinson
- Edited by: Ralph Dawson
- Music by: Frank Skinner
- Production company: Universal Pictures
- Distributed by: Universal Pictures
- Release dates: November 1949 (New York City); November 25, 1949 (United States); November 29, 1949 (Los Angeles)
- Running time: 83 minutes
- Country: United States
- Language: English

Free for All is a 1949 American comedy film directed by Charles Barton and starring Robert Cummings, Ann Blyth and Percy Kilbride.

== Plot ==
A young man invents a pill that can turn water into gasoline. While staying in Washington DC to register his patent, he falls in love with his host's daughter. However, she works for a major oil company and after she lets slip to her employers about the magical new formula, they desperately try to get their hands on it.

== Cast ==
- Robert Cummings as Christopher Parker
- Ann Blyth as Alva Abbott
- Percy Kilbride as Henry J. Abbott
- Ray Collins as A.B. Blair
- Donald Woods as Roger Abernathy
- Mikhail Rasumny as Dr. Axel Torgelson
- Percy Helton as Joe Hershey
- Harry Antrim as Mr. Whiting
- Wallis Clark as Mr. Van Alstyne
- Frank Ferguson as Hap Ross
- Dooley Wilson as Aristotle
- Russell Simpson as Farmer
- Lester Matthews as Mr. Aberson
- Murray Alper as McGuinness
- Bill Walker as Herbert
- Kenneth Tobey as Pilot
- Harris Brown as Colonel
- Willard Waterman as Commander H.C. Christie

== Production ==
The film was based on a story by Herbert Clyde Lewis called Patent Applied For. In August 1947 Universal announced they had purchased the story and it would be the first film made by producer-writer Robert Buckner under Buckner's new contract with the studio.

In May 1949 the studio announced the film would be called Hot Water and would star Ann Blyth, who had recently been put on suspension by the studio; her casting meant the suspension was lifted. The project meant Buckner's proposed film Paradise Lost, 1949 was pushed back on Universal's schedule.

In May 1949 Robert Cummings was cast in the male lead and Charles Barton was appointed director. In June the title was changed to Free for All.

Filming started in Washington in June 1949. The Daughters of the American Revolution opposed filming comedy scenes at Mount Vernon. A compromise was reached where the scenes were shot at the grounds but not inside the shrine. There were twenty days filming at the studio.

== Reception ==
Filmink called it "a weak comedy, not helped by the fact that his [Cummings'] co-star was Ann Blyth – Cummings couldn’t carry a film on his own shoulders if the material was weak, he needed someone strong to bounce off."

== Bibliography ==
- Goble, Alan. The Complete Index to Literary Sources in Film. Walter de Gruyter, 1999.
