= Gold Is Where You Find It =

1938 film

- Theatrical release poster
- Directed by: Michael Curtiz
- Screenplay by: Warren Duff; Robert Buckner
- Based on: Gold Is Where You Find It; 1936 novel by Clements Ripley
- Produced by: Samuel Bischoff; Jack L. Warner; Hal B. Wallis
- Starring: George Brent; Olivia de Havilland; Claude Rains
- Cinematography: Sol Polito
- Edited by: Clarence Kolster; Owen Marks (uncredited)
- Music by: Max Steiner
- Color process: Technicolor
- Production company: Warner Bros. Pictures
- Distributed by: Warner Bros. Pictures
- Release date: February 12, 1938 (USA)
- Running time: 94 minutes
- Country: United States
- Language: English
- Budget: over $1 million

Gold is Where You Find It is a 1938 American Western Technicolor film that gives a fictionalized account of a true event. It was directed by Michael Curtiz and stars George Brent, Olivia de Havilland, and Claude Rains, with a screenplay by Warren Duff and Robert Buckner based on a story by Clements Ripley. This Technicolor feature film was released on February 12, 1938, by Warner Bros. Pictures.

The film is set in the late 1800s, some 30 years after the first California Gold Rush, when hydraulic mining sends floods of muddy sludge into the Sacramento Valley, destroying crops and homes, ruining land and water sources and killing people caught in their path.

== Plot summary ==
A new gold strike in California ten years after the American Civil War triggers a bitter feud between farmers and miners using hydraulic mining methods that devastate the wheat farms of the Sacramento Valley. The film highlights the conflict between the mining companies and the wheat farmers by adding a romance between a mining engineer (George Brent) and the daughter (Olivia de Havilland) of a prominent farmer (Claude Rains). She believes the valley should be used for farming, not mining.

The film ends with engineer Jared and farmer Serena looking out over the valley while Jared speaks eloquently of the possible future. A vivid montage shows all the different trees bearing fruit there in the 1930s, ending with the orange groves. Serena's vision, once dismissed as impossible, has been realized.

== Cast ==
- George Brent as Jared Whitney
- Olivia de Havilland as Serena Ferris
- Claude Rains as Col. Chris Ferris
- Margaret Lindsay as Rosanne McCooey Ferris
- John Litel as Ralph Ferris
- Marcia Ralston as Molly Featherstone
- Barton MacLane as Slag Minton (Credits list the character as Slag Martin)
- Tim Holt as Lance Ferris
- Sidney Toler as Harrison McCooey
- Henry O'Neill as Supreme Court Judge
- Douglas Wood as District Court Judge Clayburn
- Willie Best as Joshua
- Robert McWade as Mr. Crouch
- George 'Gabby' Hayes as Enoch (as George Hayes)
- Russell Simpson as MacKenzie
- Harry Davenport as Dr. Parsons
- Clarence Kolb as Major Walsh
- Moroni Olsen as Sen. George Hearst
- Walter Rodgers as Gen. Ulysses S. Grant

== Production notes ==
While stationed in South Carolina in 1919, Clements Ripley met and married Katherine (Kattie) Ball, the daughter of noted journalist W. W. Ball. They lived in North Carolina and grew peaches until 1927, when they moved to Charleston, South Carolina to become writers.

The real landmark lawsuit was Woodruff v. North Bloomfield Gravel Mining Company, brought in 1882 and settled in 1884.

This was the second Warner Bros. movie to be shot in the new three-strip Technicolor process. Filming and production started on August 23, 1937 and ended on mid/late-October 1937.

According to TCM's Brian Cady, "director Michael Curtiz's felicity with the Technicolor camera led Warner Bros. Pictures to put him in the director's chair in place of William Keighley for their next Technicolor extravaganza, The Adventures of Robin Hood (1938)."

The film was shot near Weaverville, California and was plagued by torrential rains.
