= Love, Honor and Behave =

1938 film

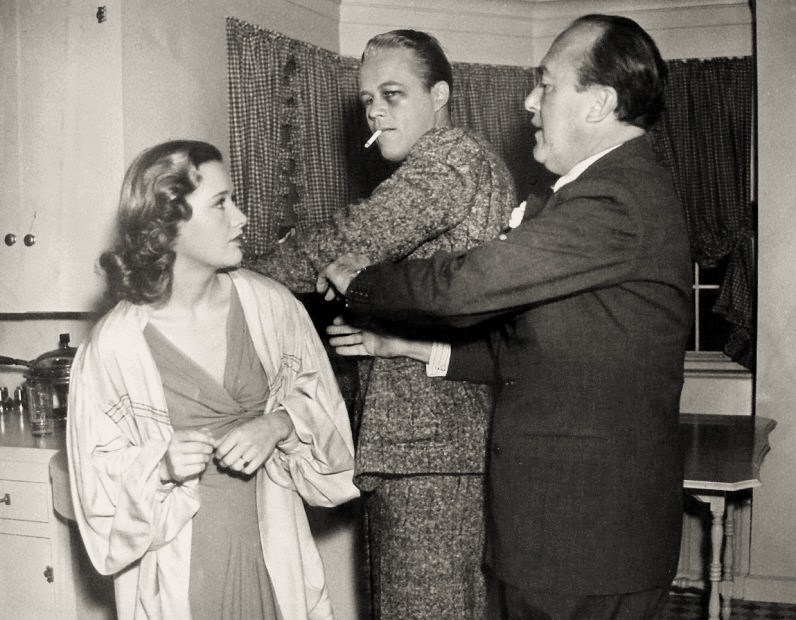
- Priscilla Lane, Wayne Morris and director Stanley Logan
- Directed by: Stanley Logan
- Screenplay by: Clements Ripley; Michael Jacoby; Robert Buckner; Lawrence Kimble
- Based on: A Saturday Evening Post Story by Stephen Vincent Benet
- Starring: Wayne Morris; Priscilla Lane
- Cinematography: George Barnes
- Edited by: Owen Marks
- Music by: Leo F. Forbstein
- Distributed by: Warner Bros. Pictures, Inc
- Release date: March 12, 1938
- Running time: 71 minutes
- Country: United States
- Language: English

Love, Honor and Behave is a 1938 American drama film directed by Stanley Logan and starring Wayne Morris and Priscilla Lane. The supporting cast includes John Litel, Thomas Mitchell, Dick Foran and Dickie Moore. "Bei Mir Bist Du Schon" serves as the motion picture's the theme song. Initially set in Meadowfield, Long Island in 1922, the picture's plot revolves around a timid husband who finally stands up for himself in the wake of being cuckolded by his ravishing wife.

== Plot ==
Dan and Sally Painter meddle in son Ted's life, quarrel and ultimately divorce after Dan's affair with Lisa Blake, whose husband Jim promptly divorces her.

Ted's belief that sportsmanship comes before winning is tested during a college tennis match, which he loses on purpose after being awarded a point that should have gone to his opponent. His dad Dan doesn't approve of this attitude and predicts Ted will be a failure in his future business life.

Barbara Blake, daughter of Lisa and Jim, becomes attracted to Ted and persuades him to elope. She soon becomes bored, though, and when ex-suitor Pete Martin begins making passes at her, Ted mistakenly believes they've had a fling. Ted's business fails but Dan rejects his son's request for a job. Ted stands up to him and to Barbara, pleasing her, even though they end up having a knockdown fight.

== Cast ==
- Wayne Morris as Ted Painter
- Priscilla Lane as Barbara Blake
- Dick Foran as Pete Martin
- Thomas Mitchell as Dan Painter
- Barbara O'Neil as Sally Painter
- John Litel as Jim Blake
- Mona Barrie as Lisa Blake
- Dickie Moore Ted Painter (as a child)
- Audrey Leonard as Barbara Blake (as a child)
- Minor Watson as Dr. MacConaghey
- Donald Briggs as Tennis Coach
- Margaret Irving as Nan
- Gregory Gaye as the Count
