= God Is My Co-Pilot (film) =

1945 film by Robert Florey

- Theatrical release poster
- Directed by: Robert Florey
- Written by: Abem Finkel; Peter Milne
- Based on: God Is My Co-Pilot; 1943 novel by Robert Lee Scott Jr.
- Produced by: Robert Buckner
- Starring: Dennis Morgan; Dane Clark
- Cinematography: Sidney Hickox; Charles A. Marshall
- Edited by: Folmar Blangsted
- Music by: Franz Waxman
- Distributed by: Warner Bros. Pictures
- Release date: February 21, 1945 (Premiere: Macon, Georgia)
- Running time: 90 minutes
- Country: United States
- Language: English
- Budget: $1,970,000
- Box office: $4,408,000

God Is My Co-Pilot is a 1945 American black-and-white biographical war film from Warner Bros. Pictures, produced by Robert Buckner, directed by Robert Florey, that stars Dennis Morgan and co-stars Dane Clark and Raymond Massey. The screenplay by Abem Finkel and Peter Milne is based on the 1943 autobiography of the same name by Robert Lee Scott Jr. (April 12, 1908 – February 27, 2006). It recounts Scott's service with the Flying Tigers and the United States Army Air Forces in China and Burma during World War II.

== Plot ==
At age 34, Army Air Force pilot Major Robert Lee Scott Jr. (Dennis Morgan) is considered too old to fly in combat, but he is recruited and volunteers to fly in a secret bombing mission from the Philippines against Tokyo, the Japanese capital. When the mission is cancelled after his arrival in India, due to the fall of the Philippines, Scott is promoted to Colonel and assigned to fly transport aircraft on dangerous, unescorted missions over The Hump from Burma to China. These flights supply aviation gasoline and other much-needed supplies to the three squadrons of the American Volunteer Group, the Flying Tigers.

Over time, Scott persuades General Claire Chennault (Raymond Massey), the commander of the Tigers, to let him fly with his experienced airmen, like "Tex" Hill (John Ridgely), who have been fighting the Japanese as mercenaries while technically being members of the Chinese Air Force. Scott gets his chance to finally fly one of their Curtiss P-40B/C Tomahawks, engaging in aerial combat missions and becoming a double-ace while flying with the AVG.

On Independence Day, the 4th of July, during a surprise bombing and fighter raid on Japanese-occupied Hong Kong, Scott once again engages in a combat duel with the infamous Japanese fighter ace nicknamed "Tokyo Joe" (Richard Loo). Although Scott's engine is hit and losing power, he suddenly drops his landing flaps, which quickly reduces his airspeed. "Joe" flies past and Scott sights him in his cross-hairs, firing nearly point blank at the Zero with his six .50 caliber machine-guns, setting "Joe"'s fighter aflame. Scott says in triumph over his radio, "There's your six-feet of China, Joe, now go fill it up". The burning Zero fighter spins out of control and crashes, as Scott's damaged P-40 continues to smoke and lose altitude. When Scott does not return to base, and no further word of him is heard after several days, he is presumed killed in combat. As Chennault begins to write a letter to Scott's widow, he hears a growing commotion outside. A nighttime, torch-lit, gong-playing Chinese procession enters the Tigers' compound, carrying the injured Scott, who is bearing "Tokyo Joe"'s Samurai sword.

After a physical examination, despite Scott's assurances that he is fine, the doctor grounds him due to his age, combat fatigue, and recurring malaria. He has to sit-out the largest air-raid against the Japanese ever planned in China. As Scott listens through an open window to the mission briefing, Chennault arrives at a personal command decision. He tells Scott that a new, larger P-40 fighter, with a more powerful engine and additional firepower, is his to fly for one final mission, a gift from "the old man". Elated, Scott goes to the plane, fires up the engine, and rapidly gets airborne. He quickly climbs skyward to join the squadrons of fighters and bombers formed-up and heading east toward certain victory.

== Cast ==
- Dennis Morgan as Robert Lee Scott Jr.
- Dane Clark as Johnny Petach
- Raymond Massey as Maj. Gen. Claire L. Chennault
- Alan Hale Sr. as "Big Mike" Harrigan, Missionary Priest
- Richard Loo as "Tokyo Joe"
- John Ridgely as "Tex" Hill
- Craig Stevens as Edward F. Rector
- Andrea King as Catherine Scott, Robert Lee Scott Jr.'s wife
- Stanley Ridges as Col. Merian Cooper
- Warren Douglas as Bob Neale
- Stephen Richard as Sgt. Baldridge
- Charles Smith as Pvt. Motley
- Minor Watson as Col. Caleb V. Haynes

== Production ==
With the cooperation of the US Army Air Forces, the principal photography took place in July–August 1944 at Luke Auxiliary One airfield in Arizona. They filmed Training Command Curtiss P-40Es and Fs, (Note: The P-40F is easily distinguished from the P-40B used by the Flying Tigers, since its Merlin engine draws intake air from the underside. The P-40Es used also had a distinctive engine and cowling profile that was different than the earlier P-40B/C.) some one dozen North American B-25Gs and various other training aircraft helped create a busy sky. But five airmen died in a midair collision. (Note: A B-25 was struck by an AT-6; three on board the bomber and the two pilots in the AT-6 all died.) With as many as 60 aircraft committed to the production, the film was the most ambitious of its kind in wartime. To portray the Japanese Mitsubishi A6M Zero fighters, the production used "Hollywood Zeros", the ubiquitous North American AT-6 trainers, repainted and carrying Japanese national insignia.

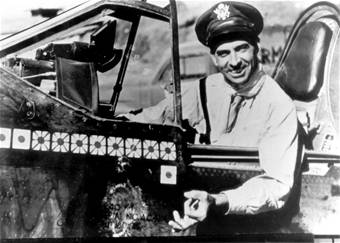
Colonel Robert L. Scott Jr. in his P-40 Warhawk in 1943 (USAF photo)

The Warner Brothers' Ranch near Los Angeles was used as the airfield seen in the film's opening sequence at the American Volunteer Group (AVG) base Kunming. There a trio of full-scale P-40 mock-ups, built several years earlier for the 1942 Republic film, Flying Tigers, are visible in the background, along with two P-40Es reclaimed from the AAF Reclamation Depot in San Diego. The film's air operations were directed by Hollywood "stunt pilots" Frank "Speed" Nolta and Major Frank Clarke. Col. Scott served as a technical adviser and flew in a number of sequences, reprising his role as a Flying Tiger.

== Reception ==
While most moviegoers may have regarded the film as typical of Hollywood, the scriptwriters were instructed to be faithful to Col. Robert Lee Scott Jr.'s original account of his exploits over China, and to provide backstory to enlarge his character. By basing the film on exploits of historical figures (only occasionally resorting to fictional characters such as "Tokyo Joe"), the film gained considerable authenticity. However, by 1945 the American film-going public were wary of what was essentially seen as another in a series of patriotic, "flag-waving" films.

Critics relegated it to an "also-ran" position, regarding the sub-plot of Scott's inspirational message as forced. The New York Times reviewer, Bosley Crowther noted that the "... pious injection of the spiritual in an otherwise noisy action film is patently ostentatious and results in a maudlin effect". Variety wrote that Florey's direction "manages authenticity and obtains excellent performances", though "undoubtedly commercial license has pointed up some incidents for better dramatic flavor". Harrison's Reports wrote that though it was "quite thrilling in spots, offers little that is new for this type of picture". Wolcott Gibbs of The New Yorker did not find the film very authentic, writing that "I remain dubious about a flier who keeps turning around to talk to passengers in the back", and sarcastically noting that the Japanese were "clearly the most incompetent aviators in the world".

Premiered in Macon, Georgia, Scott's hometown, God Is My Co-Pilot had commercial success as one of the last of the patriotic productions to be released during wartime. In a modern context, the film has received a revival in interest as it is now considered one of the "classic" aviation films, primarily due to its aerial scenes, which were always considered one of its assets. Along with Scott's role in telling the story of the Flying Tigers, God is My Co-Pilot is now considered to be more a historical record.

=== Box Office ===
According to Warner Bros records, the film had budget of $1,970,000 while earning $3,373,000 domestically and $1,035,000 in foreign countries.
