= The Man Who Won the War =

1936 short story by Robert Buckner

- Author: Robert Buckner
- Language: English
- Genre: Alternate history, adventure fiction
- Publisher: The Atlantic
- Publication date: 1936
- Publication place: United States
- Media type: Short story

The Man Who Won the War is a 1936 alternate history short story by Robert Buckner. The story details the exploits of Roger Bradman, a Royal Navy officer who "won" World War I for the Allies. Though the story is fictional, it is presented as a true story; Buckner claims that the story cannot be "legally" proven, as there are no official records of what happened.

According to the Dictionary of Literary Biography, Buckner wrote the story after spending time with Cecil Brandon, upon whose life the story is modelled.

== Plot summary ==
In 1927, while on a train from Cologne to Brussels, Buckner meets former British naval officer Roger Bradman, who is carrying a small parcel. As they discuss German rearmament, the League of Nations, and the likelihood of a second Great War, Buckner remarks that the United States cannot afford to win another war. A bemused Bradman claims that he won the war, not the Americans; when Buckner doubts him, Bradman tells his story.

Bradman's story starts in 1913, when he was a spy for Naval Intelligence. Buckner recognizes him as the centre of the "Bradman Spy Case", when Bradman was caught for attempting to steal the plans for German fortresses on Heligoland. With the outbreak of the Great War, Bradman was assigned to command the destroyer HMS Firedrake, attached to Admiral Horace Hood's naval force in the North Sea.

On the night of October 28, 1914, during the Battle of the Yser, Bradman observed a fire signal from the Belgian coast near Nieuwpoort, and him and a team of sailors set out to investigate. Finding a small unit of Belgian soldiers with two captive German sentries, Bradman learned that the Germans would likely break through Belgian lines in Flanders and take Paris, defeating the Allies; the Belgian unit was sent as a desperate last resort to signal the Royal Navy for help, in the hopes that they could bombard the Germans with naval artillery or deploy a landing force to assist. Bradman admitted that the Firedrake was only armed with light guns and had too small of a crew to make a difference, much to the Belgians' dismay.

Noticing the muddied knees of a captured German sentry reminded him of kilts, Bradman remembered the Firedrake had mistakenly received a shipment of equipment (including kilts) intended for the Cameron Highlanders, and devised a plan: he would dress the Belgians in the Cameron Highlanders' uniforms and give them Lewis guns, deceiving the Germans into thinking the British had arrived to assist the Belgians. The Belgians agreed to the plan, and after Bradman and the Firedrake departed on the morning of October 29, the Belgian unit repelled the German advance while the dikes of the Yser were opened, turning the tide of the war in the Allies' favour.

However, when the loss of the Cameron Highlanders' equipment was reported, it was alleged that Bradman had given the equipment to the Germans, and he was court-martialed for treason. With no evidence to prove or disprove the charges, Bradman was stripped of his rank and imprisoned for the rest of the war. After the war, Bradman changed his name and moved across the British Empire, as the treason charge led to former Royal Navy members recognizing him and forcing him to flee. Eventually, in 1924, Bradman returned to Nieuwpoort, where he met fellow hotel guest Gunnar Bechtel and told him his story. Bechtel revealed that he was the captured German sentry whose muddied knees inspired Bradman's plan, and admitted he felt guilty for having indirectly caused the death, destruction, and misery of the Great War to continue for four more years. Realizing "the man who won the war" and "the man who lost the war" were the only people who knew the truth, and unsure how to feel about their coincidental reunification, the two of them returned to the hotel in silence, eventually becoming pen pals.

With Bradman's story over, Buckner asks what happened to Bechtel. Bradman reveals that Bechtel died in Dortmund a week prior, and that he is on the train to Brussels to bury Bechtel at the coast of Nieuwpoort, opening his parcel to reveal Bechtel's urn.
