= Robert Shayne =

American actor (1900–1992)

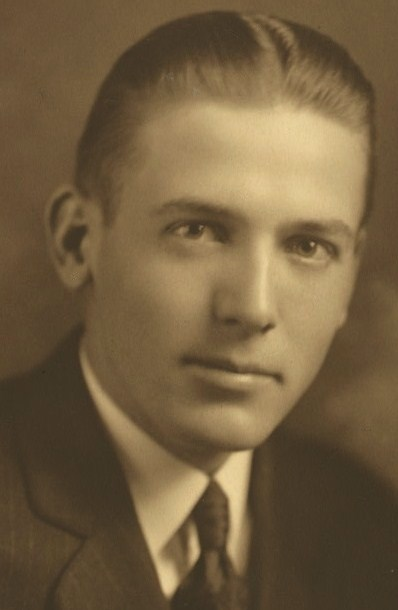
- Shayne in 1930
- Born: Robert Shaen Dawe; October 4, 1900; Yonkers, New York, U.S.
- Died: November 29, 1992 (aged 92); Woodland Hills, California, U.S.
- Resting place: Forest Lawn Memorial Park, Hollywood Hills, California
- Occupation: Actor
- Years active: 1929–1991
- Spouses: Mary Crouch (m. 1925; div. 1933) Mary Sheffield (m. 1933; div. 1943) Elizabeth (Bette) McDonald (m. 1943)
- Children: 4

Robert Shayne (born Robert Shaen Dawe, October 4, 1900 – November 29, 1992) was an American actor whose career lasted for over 60 years. He was best known for portraying Inspector Bill Henderson in the American television series Adventures of Superman.

== Early years ==
Shayne was born in Yonkers, New York. He was the son of Mr. and Mrs. Grosvenor Dawe, and he had a brother, Allen Shaen Dawe. His father was one of the founders of the United States Chamber of Commerce.

Shayne left Boston University in his senior year so that his brother could go to college. For a time, he lived in Birmingham, Alabama, writing advertising copy for a women's clothing store by day and acting in a stock theater company at night. When the store went out of business, he began acting full-time.

== Career ==
Shayne became an actor after having worked as a reporter at the Illustrated Daily Tab in Miami, Florida. His initial acting experience came with repertory companies in Alabama, including the Birmingham Players.

=== Stage ===
Shayne's first Broadway appearance came by 1931 in The Rap. His other Broadway shows include Yellow Jack (1934), The Cat and the Canary (1935), Whiteoaks (1938), with Ethel Barrymore, and Without Love (1942), with Katharine Hepburn.

=== Film ===
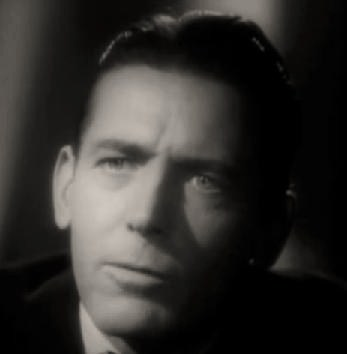
Shayne in Smash-Up: The Story of a Woman (1947)

Shayne began his film career in 1934, appearing in two features. In 1942, he became a contract actor with Warner Bros. He played many character roles in movies and television, including a film series of Warner Bros. featurettes called the Santa Fe Trail series such as Wagon Wheels West, and as a mad scientist in the 1953 horror film The Neanderthal Man.

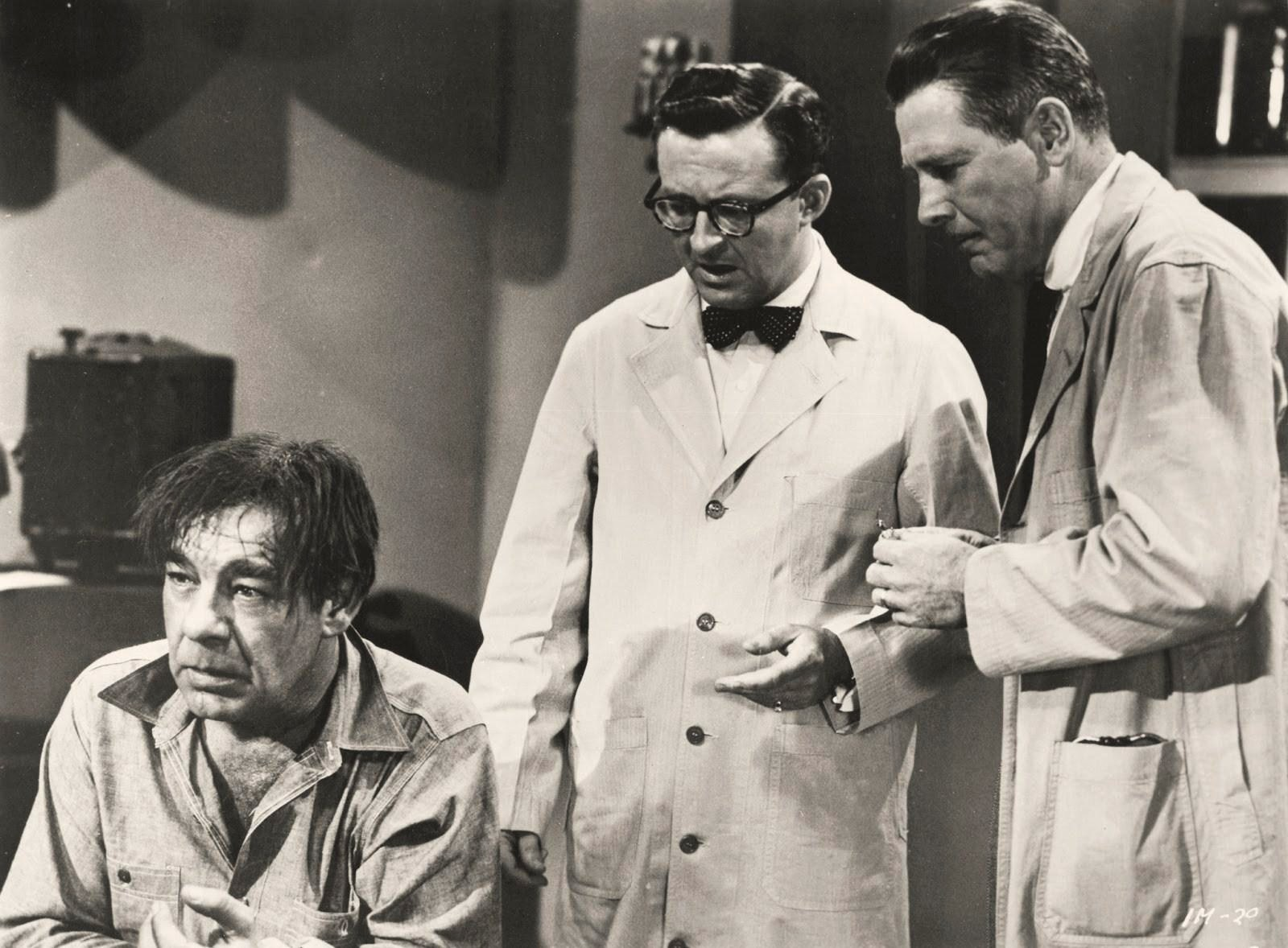
From Indestructible Man (1956), L-R: Lon Chaney Jr., Joe Flynn, and Robert Shayne

He appears briefly in Alfred Hitchcock's North by Northwest, seated at a booth in a hotel bar, where his character meets Cary Grant's character, just as the latter is about to be kidnapped. He also had a small but pivotal role in the 1953 sci-fi classic Invaders From Mars as a scientist. Shayne enjoyed a brief rebirth in his career when he was cast as the blind newspaper vendor in The Flash television show.

=== Television ===
Shayne portrayed Police Inspector William "Bill" Henderson on the 1950s TV series Adventures of Superman. He appeared sporadically in the early episodes of the series, in part because he was accused by his second wife Mary Sheffield, and came under HUAC scrutiny and was briefly blacklisted on unproven and unspecific charges of association with Communism. As the program evolved, especially in the color episodes, he was brought into more and more of them, to the point where he was a regular on the series.

== Personal life ==
Shayne married Mary Crouch in 1925. They had one daughter, but divorced in 1933.

In 1933, he married Mary Sheffield. They also had one daughter, and divorced in 1943.

In 1943, he married Elizabeth McDonald, with whom he had 2 more children. They remained married until his death in 1992.

== Death ==
Shayne died in 1992 of lung cancer at the Motion Picture Hospital in Woodland Hills, California. He was 92 years old. Shayne was buried in Forest Lawn Memorial Park, Hollywood Hills, California.

== Selected filmography ==
- Keep 'Em Rolling (1934) - Major James Parker
- Wednesday's Child (1934) - Howard Benson
- The People's Enemy (1935) - First Department of Justice Representative (uncredited)
- Mission to Moscow (1943) - Engineer (uncredited)
- Shine On Harvest Moon (1944) - Dan Costello
- Mr. Skeffington (1944) - MacMahon
- I Won't Play (1944 short) - Chaplain aka 'Padre'
- Make Your Own Bed (1944) - Lester Knight
- Roaring Guns (1944) - Jared Whitney
- Hollywood Canteen (1944) - Busboy (uncredited)
- Escape in the Desert (1945) - Radio Newscaster (voice, uncredited)
- Rhapsody in Blue (1945) - Christine's Escort (uncredited)
- Christmas in Connecticut (1945) - Dudley Beecham
- San Antonio (1945) - Captain Morgan
- The Face of Marble (1946) - Dr. David Cochran
- Three Strangers (1946) - Bertram Fallon
- I Ring Doorbells (1946) - Dick Meadows
- Behind the Mask (1946) - Brad Thomas
- Nobody Lives Forever (1946) - Chet King
- Wife Wanted (1946) - Bill Tyler
- I Cover Big Town (1947) - Chief Tom Blake
- Smash-Up: The Story of a Woman (1947) - Mr. Gordon
- Backlash (1947) - James O'Neil
- Welcome Stranger (1947) - Roy Chesley
- The Spirit of West Point (1947) - Col. Earl 'Red' Blaik
- The Swordsman (1948) - Ronald MacArden
- The Inside Story (1948) - T.W. 'Tom' O'Connor
- Best Man Wins (1948) - Judge Leonidas K. Carter
- Shaggy (1948) - Bob Calvin
- The Strange Mrs. Crane (1948) - Floyd Durant
- Let's Live a Little (1948) - Dr. Richard Field
- Loaded Pistols (1948) - Don Mason
- Law of the Barbary Coast (1949) - Michael Lodge
- Forgotten Women (1949) - Richard Marshall
- The Threat (1949) - Police Insp. Murphy
- Dynamite Pass (1950) - Jay Wingate
- Customs Agent (1950) - West Coast Chief Agent J.G. Goff
- Rider from Tucson (1950) - John Avery
- State Penitentiary (1950) - Stanley Brown
- Federal Man (1950) - Chief Agent Charles Stuart
- When You're Smiling (1950) - Jack Lacey
- Big Timber (1950) - Dixon
- Experiment Alcatraz (1950) - Barry Morgan
- Missing Women (1951) - Cincotta
- The Dakota Kid (1951) - Ace Crandall
- Criminal Lawyer (1951) - Clark P. Sommers
- Indian Uprising (1952) - Maj. Nathan Stark
- Without Warning! (1952) - Dr. Werner, Police Psychiatrist
- And Now Tomorrow (1952)
- The Ring (1952) - Jimmy - Aragon's Manager
- Mr. Walkie Talkie (1952) - Capt. Burke
- Marshal of Cedar Rock (1953) - Paul Jackson / Fake John Harper
- Lone Ranger (1953) - S3/E31 "Black Gold" - Spinner
- Prince of Pirates (1953) - Prime Minister Treeg
- The Blue Gardenia (1953) - Doctor (uncredited)
- The Lady Wants Mink (1953) - Cecil
- Invaders from Mars (1953) - Dr. Bill Wilson (uncredited)
- The Neanderthal Man (1953) - Prof. Clifford Groves
- Sea of Lost Ships (1953) - Executive Officer (uncredited)
- Flight Nurse (1953) - Surgeon (uncredited)
- Trader Tom of the China Seas (1954) - Maj. Conroy
- The Desperado (1954) - Prosecutor (uncredited)
- Tobor the Great (1954) - General #1 (uncredited)
- Murder Is My Beat (1955) - Police Captain Bert Rawley
- The Eternal Sea (1955) - Cmdr. Dean (uncredited)
- Double Jeopardy (1955) - Mr. Ross (uncredited)
- King of the Carnival (1955) - Jess Carter
- Indestructible Man (1956) - Prof. Bradshaw
- Rumble on the Docks (1956) - Judge (uncredited)
- Accused of Murder (1956) - Doctor (uncredited)
- Dance with Me, Henry (1956) - Proctor
- Hot Shots (1956) - Pierre M. Morley
- Kronos (1957) -Air Force General
- Footsteps in the Night (1957) - Fred Horner
- The Giant Claw (1957) - Gen. Van Buskirk
- Spook Chasers (1957) - Police Lt. Harris
- Death in Small Doses (1957) - FDA Chief Insp. Frank Ainsley (uncredited)
- Adventures of Superman (1952-1958, TV Series) - Inspector Launay / Police Inspector Bill Henderson
- War of the Satellites (1958) - Cole Hotchkiss
- Teenage Cave Man (1958) - The Fire Maker
- How to Make a Monster (1958) - Gary Droz
- The Lost Missile (1958) - Air Force General (uncredited)
- Revolt in the Big House (1958) - Mickey (uncredited)
- I Mobster (1958) - Senator
- The Rebel Set (1959) - Lt. Cassidy
- North by Northwest (1959) - Larry Wade (uncredited)
- Battle Flame (1959) - Lt. Norris
- Toby Tyler (1960) - Husband in Audience (uncredited)
- Valley of the Redwoods (1960) - Capt. Sid Walker
- Why Must I Die? (1960) - Charlie Munro
- Cage of Evil (1960) - Victor Delmar
- From the Terrace (1960) - Partner (uncredited)
- 20,000 Eyes (1961) - Police Lieutenant
- Son of Flubber (1963) - Defense Secretary's Assistant (uncredited)
- A Tiger Walks (1964) - Governor's Adviser (uncredited)
- Runaway Girl (1965) - Walter Quillen
- Winning (1969) - Well-Wisher at Indy Victory (uncredited)
- The Arrangement (1969) - Board Member (uncredited)
- Tora! Tora! Tora! (1970) - Cmdr. William H. Buracker - Halsey's Operations Officer (uncredited)
- The Yin and the Yang of Mr. Go (1970) - U.S. Senator (uncredited)
- The Barefoot Executive (1971) - Sponsor
- The Million Dollar Duck (1971) - Refinery Executive (uncredited)
- Cool Breeze (1972) - Dr. Fields, Gynocologist (uncredited)
- The Specialist (1975) - Chairman Hopkins
- The Four Deuces (1975) - Vince
