= Nobody Lives Forever (film) =

1946 film by Jean Negulesco

- Theatrical release poster
- Directed by: Jean Negulesco
- Screenplay by: W. R. Burnett
- Based on: Nobody Lives Forever; 1943 novel by W. R. Burnett
- Produced by: Robert Buckner
- Starring: John Garfield; Geraldine Fitzgerald
- Cinematography: Arthur Edeson
- Edited by: Rudi Fehr
- Music by: Adolph Deutsch
- Production company: Warner Bros. Pictures
- Distributed by: Warner Bros. Pictures
- Release date: October 12, 1946
- Running time: 100 minutes
- Country: United States
- Language: English

Nobody Lives Forever is a 1946 American crime film noir directed by Jean Negulesco and based on the novel of the same name by W. R. Burnett. It stars John Garfield and Geraldine Fitzgerald and features Walter Brennan, Faye Emerson, George Coulouris and George Tobias.

== Plot ==
Former free-wheeling con artist Nick Blake (John Garfield) is discharged from a U.S. Army hospital in New York City after recuperating from injuries sustained during World War II. He's welcomed back by old crony Al Doyle, and immediately seeks to hook up with girlfriend Toni (Faye Emerson). Ostensibly, she was holding money for him while he was in the army. But she claims she lost it investing in a nightclub where she is now employed as a singer. After getting his money back from the club's new owner, Nick and his best friend Al (George Tobias) travel to Los Angeles to visit an old friend Pop (Walter Brennan). There, they become involved in a new scam when another con man, Doc Ganson (George Coulouris) spots a rich sucker.

The plan is to have Nick, a ladies' man, romance millionaire widow Gladys Halvorsen (Geraldine Fitzgerald) and persuade her to invest in a phony tugboat business. Nick agrees on condition he get two-thirds of the proceeds. This angers Doc, who bitterly resents the younger, more successful Nick. However, Nick unexpectedly falls in love with the intended victim and decides to back out of the con. At the same time, he admits the truth to Gladys anyway. She is hopelessly in love and refuses to let him go.

Nick prepares to pay the others the $30,000 he promised them, using his own money. Toni shows up from New York, though, and learns of the aborted scheme. When she tells Doc she is sure Nick intends to marry Gladys and her millions, the gang kidnaps the widow for a larger share of her money. But Pop, in league with Nick and Al, trails them to a hideout on Beach Road. In the ensuing gunfight, Nick rescues Gladys, but both Doc and Pop are killed.

== Cast ==
- John Garfield as Nick Blake
- Geraldine Fitzgerald as Gladys Halvorsen
- Walter Brennan as Pop Gruber
- Faye Emerson as Toni Blackburn
- George Coulouris as Doc Ganson
- George Tobias as Al Doyle, Nick's friend
- Robert Shayne as Chet King
- Richard Gaines as Charles Manning
- Richard Erdman as Bellboy
- James Flavin as Shake Thomas, one of Doc's men
- Ralph Peters as Windy Mather, Doc's other associate
- Grady Sutton as Horace, the Counterman at Joe's Diner (uncredited)

== Production ==
Nobody Lives Forever originated when Warner Bros. Pictures commissioned W. R. Burnett to write an original story for a film intended to star Humphrey Bogart, but Burnett's contracts carried a clause giving a time limit for the film to be made; after that time, the rights reverted to Burnett. This occurred with Nobody Lives Forever, and Burnett then sold the story to Collier's Magazine in 1943 for serialization, and then to Alfred A. Knopf in 1945 for publication in book form. Warners then purchased the rights once more, and also paid Burnett to write the screenplay for the film. By that time, Bogart was not available, as he was tied up making The Big Sleep, and was replaced with John Garfield, hot off of The Postman Always Rings Twice.

When the film was initially conceived, Ann Sheridan was to co-star with Bogart.

== Critical response ==
New York Times film critic Bosley Crowther, while writing that the production team "managed a craftsmanlike job", nonetheless said that viewers will find the film's "repetition just a bit wearisome and even dull. They are likely to find the dialogue — although flavored with such racy words as 'pitch' and 'plant' and 'sucker' — rather heavily loaded with cliches. And they will certainly find nothing original in the easy solution of the plot."

New York newspaper PM was disapproving: "Almost every member of the cast...is a good actor...has served a respectful apprenticeship in the craft, and has proved by his past performance his dedication have not been in vain. Each...has gone on to conquer the heights where lies that rarest prize—the boon of audience sympathy. So it is sad indeed to watch them all, in 'Nobody Lives Forever,' again hard at work achieving that boon, but for the wrong reason. They don't want it, nor does the audience prefer to give it to them, because the story that engulfs them is unworthy. There is little pleasure, for the audience, at least, in watching talent battered against a blown-up stereotype. For no matter how proficient and interesting its performance, no matter also how brooding its treatment, nor skillfully its physical production—'Nobody Lives Forever' is an inflated cliché and, the more everybody connected with it pretends it isn't, the more stubbornly it is."

== Adaptation ==
The film was adapted for radio on the Lux Radio Theatre. The production featured Jane Wyman and Ronald Reagan and was aired on November 17, 1947.
