= To Paris with Love =

- Directed by: Robert Hamer
- Screenplay by: Robert Buckner
- Story by: Sterling Noel
- Produced by: Antony Darnborough
- Starring: Alec Guinness
- Cinematography: Reginald H. Wyer
- Edited by: Anne V. Coates
- Music by: Edwin Astley
- Production company: Two Cities Films
- Distributed by: General Film Distributors (UK)
- Release date: 11 January 1955 (UK)
- Running time: 78 min.
- Country: United Kingdom
- Language: English

To Paris with Love is a 1955 British comedy film directed by Robert Hamer and starring Alec Guinness, Odile Versois and Vernon Gray.

== Premise ==
A father and son play matchmaker for each other during a trip to Paris.

== Cast ==
- Alec Guinness as Col. Sir Edgar Fraser
- Odile Versois as Lizette Marconne
- Vernon Gray as John Fraser
- Elina Labourdette as Sylvia Gilbert
- Jacques François as Victor de Colville
- Austin Trevor as Leon de Colville
- Jacques Brunius as Aristide Marconnet
- Claude Romain as Georges Duprez
- Maureen Davis as Suzanne de Colville
- Mollie Hartley Milburn as Madame Alvarez
- Michael Anthony as Pierre
- Pamela Stirling as Madame Marconnet
- Claude Collier as solo drummer, cabaret act
- George Lafaye Company as cabaret act

== Production ==
Though the release prints received the credit 'Color by Technicolor', the production was filmed on location in Eastmancolor and at Pinewood Studios in 3-strip Technicolor. This was at a time when the photographing of British films in colour was moving from 3-strip Technicolor to Eastmancolor. Such films are considered hybrids, another being The Purple Plain, made by the same production company the previous year.

Guinness was one of the leading comedy stars in England at the time.

== Reception ==
=== Critical ===
In a contemporary review, The New York Times wrote, "the screen play by Robert Buckner about a Scottish gentleman and his son who visit Paris and have mild infatuations, the son with an older woman and the father with a girl, is an obvious and strained stab at humor, almost empty of wit or irony. And the performance of Mr. Guinness in it is perhaps the most pallid and listless he has ever turned in. These are hard words to utter about Mr. Guinness and one of his films, but the lack of his customary vigor is so evident that the words cannot be withheld. Except for occasional moments, when Mr. Guinness takes sudden spurts at farce—such as getting his suspenders caught in a hotel-room door or finding himself entangled in a badminton net—he walks through his slight romantic pretense as though he were either ill or bored. His director, Robert Hamer, must share the responsibility, too, for the pace and invention in creation are conspicuously slow and undefined".

More recently, the Radio Times applauded the film as "An amiable, light-hearted exercise in postwar "naughtiness"...enlivened by Guinness's engaging performance, reunited as he is with his Kind Hearts and Coronets director Robert Hamer, and a screenplay of sweet charm from Warner Bros veteran Robert Buckner. Both the leading lady, lovely Odile Versois, and Paris itself are delightful in mid-1950s Technicolor, and this movie, though slight, is often shamefully underrated."

=== Box office ===
Walter Reade paid Rank a guarantee of $400,000 for the film which was considered high.

The film earned $700,000 in the US, a strong figure for a British movie at the time.
