= Jean Driant =

French-born character actor (1922–1989)

Jean-Charles Driant (1922–1989) was a French-born character actor remembered for numerous supporting roles in British film and TV.

== Life ==
He was born in Paris, France on 12 July 1922.

He came to England in or before 1947. In the 1970s he was teaching French at Latymer Upper School.

He died in Kensington in 1989.

== Family ==
In 1947 he married Joan Fulton in Kensington.

== Film ==
- The Colditz Story (1955) as French orderly
- House of Secrets a.k.a. Triple Deception (1956) as Gratz's assistant
- The Whole Truth (1958) as servant
- The Ugly Duckling (1959) as Monsieur Blum
- Return from the Ashes (1965) as train conductor
- Soft Beds, Hard Battles (1974) as Jean
- Aces High (1976) as corporal at dressing station

== TV ==
- Douglas Fairbanks Presents a.k.a. Rheingold Theatre several appearances from 1953 to 1957
- Glencannon (1959) as photographer
- No Hiding Place (1960) as French clerk
- International Detective (1960) as bartender
- Zero One (1962) as Pierre
- Drama 61-67 (1964) as a waiter
- A Man of Our Times (1968) as hotel proprietor
- The Troubleshooters 1970 as a gendarme
- The Persuaders! several episodes 1971
- Doctor in Charge several appearances 1972/73 as Dr Lascelles
- Mission: Monte Carlo (1974)
- Wings (1978) as a mechanic
- Return of the Saint several appearances 1978/79
