= Virginia City (film) =

1940 film directed by Michael Curtiz

- Theatrical release poster
- Directed by: Michael Curtiz
- Screenplay by: Robert Buckner
- Produced by: Robert Fellows
- Starring: Errol Flynn; Miriam Hopkins; Randolph Scott; Humphrey Bogart
- Cinematography: Sol Polito
- Edited by: George Amy
- Music by: Max Steiner
- Production company: Warner Bros. Pictures
- Distributed by: Warner Bros. Pictures
- Release dates: March 16, 1940 (US); 1947 (France)
- Running time: 121 minutes
- Country: United States
- Language: English
- Budget: $1,179,000
- Box office: $2,120,000; 2,372,567 admissions (France, 1947)

Virginia City is a 1940 American Western film directed by Michael Curtiz and starring Errol Flynn, Miriam Hopkins, Randolph Scott, and a mustachioed Humphrey Bogart in the role of the real-life outlaw John Murrell. Based on a screenplay by Robert Buckner, the film is about a Union officer who escapes from a Confederate prison and is sent to Virginia City, from where his former prison commander is planning to send five million dollars in gold to Virginia to save the Confederacy. The film premiered in its namesake, Virginia City, Nevada. The film was shot in black and white (sepiatone).

== Plot ==
Union officer Kerry Bradford stages an escape from Confederate Libby Prison run by the commandant, Vance Irby. Bradford reports to Union headquarters and is sent to Virginia City, a Nevada mining town, to find out where $5,000,000 in gold that Southern sympathizers plan to ship to the tottering Confederacy is being kept. On the westbound stagecoach, he meets and falls in love with Julia Hayne who, unbeknown to him, is in fact a dance-hall entertainer and a rebel spy, sent by Jefferson Davis to assist in the transfer of the gold by wagon train. Also on the stagecoach is John Murrell, leader of a gang of "banditos", travelling as a gun salesman. Before he and his gang can rob the stage, Bradford gets the drop on Murrell, who is forced to send his men away.

When the stage reaches Virginia City, Julia gives Bradford the slip and heads off to warn Captain Irby, who is now managing the gold-smuggling operation, that Bradford is in town. Bradford follows Irby to the rebels' hideout behind a false wall in a blacksmith's shop, but the gold is moved before he arrives. The Union garrison is called out to patrol the roads to prevent any wagons from leaving town.

While Irby is meeting with the sympathetic town doctor, Murrell shows up looking for someone to set his broken arm. Irby offers Murrell $10,000 to have his banditos attack the garrison, which will force the Union soldiers guarding the roads to come to its defense. While the soldiers are busy, Irby's rebels will smuggle the gold out in the false bottoms of their wagons. First Irby needs to take care of Bradford. He uses Julia to arrange a meeting between the two men, and then takes Bradford prisoner, intending to return him to prison.

The rebels' caravan is stopped at a Union outpost. At first, they are allowed to proceed, but after watching the bullion-laden wagons have difficulty moving through the soft dirt, the soldiers become suspicious and attempt to inspect the wagons. The Southerners start a firefight, killing the soldiers. In the confusion, Bradford escapes. Pursued by Irby and his men, he rides his horse down a steep incline and ends up somersaulting down the hill. The rebels, believing him dead, continue toward Texas. Bradford returns to the outpost and sends a telegraph to the garrison. Major Drewery, the garrison commander, arrives with a contingent of cavalry. Drewery, scornful of Bradford as a soldier, does not take his advice and ends up following a false trail, causing the pursuit to fall further behind the rebels, who are themselves fighting thirst, privation, and the unforgiving terrain. Bradford persuades Drewery to allow him to take a small detachment to follow his hunch.

Bradford and his men catch up with the caravan which is trapped in a canyon and being attacked by Murrell's banditos who are attempting to take the gold. Irby is wounded in the gunfight, but Bradford's military skills and the rebels' long guns eventually drive off the banditos. Before dying, Irby delegates command of the caravan and its gold to Bradford. During the night, knowing that in the morning both Murrell's men and Drewery's command will arrive, Bradford takes the gold from the wagons and buries it in the canyon to prevent its capture.

Drewery and his men arrive in the morning in time to crush the outlaws' renewed attack, and Murrell is killed. Bradford refuses to disclose the gold's location and is brought up on charges in a court-martial. He defends his action in that, "as a soldier", he knew the gold might have been used to win the war for the South and prevented that, but "as a man" he knows it belongs to the South and would prefer that it be used to rebuild the South's shattered economy and wounded pride after the war. The court finds him guilty of high treason and sentences him to death on April 9, 1865.

The day before the scheduled execution, Julia meets with Abraham Lincoln and pleads for Bradford's life. Lincoln reveals that at that very moment, Generals Lee and Grant are meeting at Appomattox Courthouse to end the war. As the war is over, and in a symbol of the reconciliation between North and South, Lincoln pardons Bradford.

== Main Cast ==
- Errol Flynn as Captain Kerry Bradford
- Miriam Hopkins as Julia Hayne
- Randolph Scott as Captain Vance Irby
- Humphrey Bogart as John Murrell
- Frank McHugh as Mr. Upjohn
- Alan Hale as Olaf "Moose" Swenson
- Guinn "Big Boy" Williams as "Marblehead"
- John Litel as Thomas Marshall
- Douglass Dumbrille as Major Drewery
- Moroni Olsen as Dr. Robert Cameron
- Russell Hicks as John Armistead
- Dickie Jones as Cobby Gill
- Frank Wilcox as Union Outpost Soldier
- Russell Simpson as Frank Gaylord
- Victor Kilian as Abraham Lincoln
- Charles Middleton as Jefferson Davis

== Uncredited Cast ==
- Ward Bond as Confederate Sergeant
- Roy Gordon as Maj. Gen. Taylor
- Thurston Hall as Gen. George Meade
- Howard C. Hickman as Confederate Gen. Page
- Jack Mower as Outpost Officer
- Charles Trowbridge as James Seddon
- Sam McDaniel as Sam Moore, Kentucky wagon driver
- William Hopper as Lieutenant reporting Merrill’s attack

== Production ==
The film was a follow-up to Dodge City although it has entirely new characters and was not a sequel, predating it by eight years in historical time. It was originally called Nevada and was to star basically the same director and cast as Dodge City: Flynn, Olivia de Havilland, Ann Sheridan, Donald Crisp, Guinn Williams, and Alan Hale. The title was eventually changed to Virginia City, which had been owned by RKO, but they agreed to give it to Warners.

De Havilland dropped out and was replaced by Brenda Marshall. However, within a few weeks, Miriam Hopkins replaced her. Randolph Scott was hired to play Flynn's antagonist. Victor Jory was going to play the main villain but had a scheduling conflict due to his appearance in The Light of Western Stars. He was replaced by Humphrey Bogart, requiring It All Came True to be pushed back.

There was six weeks' filming based in Flagstaff, Arizona.

== Release and reception ==
The film was given a gala premiere in Reno and Virginia City in Nevada on March 16, 1940 and was released March 23.

=== Critical reception ===
Frank Nugent of The New York Times, despite criticizing the acting talents of Flynn and Hopkins, wrote that "there is enough concentrated action in [Virginia City], enough of the old-time Western sweep, to make it lively entertainment".

Variety wrote: "As a shoot 'em up, the picture is first class; as a bit of cinematic history telling, it is far short of the possibilities indicated by the title and cast."

FilmInk magazine called it "a big, expensive, noisy movie which aims for size and spectacle over, say, suspense and thrills – I don't think director Michael Curtiz was any more excited by Westerns than Flynn, but both do professional jobs, as does Scott."

In 2025, The Hollywood Reporter listed Virginia City as having the best stunts of 1940.

=== Box office ===
According to Warner Bros records, the film earned $1,518,000 domestically and $602,000 foreign.

When the film was released in France in 1947, it became one of the most popular movies of the year.

== See also ==
- List of films and television shows about the American Civil War
