= Clements Ripley =

American screenwriter

- Born: August 26, 1892; Tacoma, Washington, U.S.
- Died: July 22, 1954 (aged 61); Charleston, South Carolina, U.S.
- Resting place: Magnolia Cemetery, Charleston, South Carolina, U.S.
- Education: Taft School; Yale University
- Occupation: Screenwriter
- Spouse: Katherine Ball (m. 1919)
- Children: 1
- Relatives: William Y. W. Ripley (grandfather)
- Writing career
- Genre: Fiction

Clements Ripley (August 26, 1892 – July 22, 1954) was an American fiction writer and screenwriter.

== Early life ==
Ripley was born on August 26, 1892, in Tacoma, Washington. He was the son of Thomas E. Ripley, and the grandson of American Civil War officer William Y. W. Ripley, who received the Medal of Honor for heroism at the Battle of Malvern Hill. Clements Ripley attended the Taft School and graduated from Yale University in 1916. At Yale, he was an editor of the campus humor magazine The Yale Record with James Ashmore Creelman, writer of King Kong and The Most Dangerous Game.

== Military service ==
Ripley joined the United States Army during World War I. He was commissioned as a second lieutenant in the 14th Field Artillery Regiment. He served until 1920, rising to the rank of captain.

== Writing career ==
While stationed in South Carolina in 1919, Ripley met and married Katherine (Kattie) Ball, the daughter of noted journalist W. W. Ball. They lived in North Carolina and grew peaches until 1927, when they moved to Charleston, South Carolina to become writers. (Katherine Ball later wrote about this experience in 1931's Sand in My Shoes.)

Clements Ripley wrote seven novels, three of which were made into movies, as well as several screenplays. He also wrote numerous short stories and serials, some of which were published in popular magazines, including Cosmopolitan and the Saturday Evening Post.

== Death and burial ==
He died in Charleston July 22, 1954. He was memorialized in his family's plot at Evergreen Cemetery in Rutland, Vermont, and was buried at Magnolia Cemetery in Charleston.

== Family ==
Clements Ripley and Katherine Ball were the parents of William Y. W. Ripley (1921–2013), a notable South Carolina journalist and historian.

== Works ==
=== Novels ===
- Dust and Sun (1929), which was made into the 1930 film A Devil with Women, starring Humphrey Bogart
- Devil Drums (1930)
- Black Moon (1933), which was made into a 1934 film of the same name, starring Fay Wray
- Murder Walks Alone (1935)
- Gold Is Where You Find It (1936), which was made into a 1938 film of the same name, starring Olivia de Havilland and Claude Rains
- Clear for Action (1940)
- Mississippi Belle (1942)

=== Screenplays ===
- Love, Honor and Behave (1938), co-writer
- Jezebel (1938), co-writer, for which Bette Davis received the Academy Award for Best Actress and Fay Bainter for Best Supporting Actress. It was also made into an episode of the same name of the TV series Lux Video Theatre in 1956, for which he wrote the screenplay.
- Pioneer Woman (1940)
- Buffalo Bill (1944) with Joel McCrea, Maureen O'Hara and Anthony Quinn
- Old Los Angeles (1948) (screenplay and story)

=== Short stories ===
- "For Ways That Are Dark", Argosy All-Story Weekly, Apr 2 1921
- "Mr. Hartman Finesses a Queen", Breezy Stories, Jan 1923
- "Ain't That Our Luck", Adventure, Dec 20 1923
- "The Unkeyed Letter", Top-Notch, Jul 1 1925
- "Gun Cargo", The Frontier, Sep 1926
- "Bucko", Frontier Stories, Nov 1927
- "Cities of Fear", Everybody's Magazine, Jan 1928
- "The Man for the Job", Everybody's Magazine, Dec 1928
- "Hard Old Man", The American Magazine, Jun 1931
- "Good-Will Tour", Cosmopolitan, Oct 1932
- "The Socking of Cicero", Cosmopolitan, Oct 1933
- "Bank Holdup", Cosmopolitan, Jan 1934
- "A Lady Comes to Town", Cosmopolitan, Jun 1934
- "Patriot", Cosmopolitan, Jul 1935
- "Tenth Commandment", Cosmopolitan, Nov 1935
- "The Cute Little Trick", Redbook, Dec 1937
- "The Knife Look", Cosmopolitan, May 1939
- "Once an Artilleryman—", The Saturday Evening Post, Aug 24 1940
- "Each in His Turn", The Saturday Evening Post, Jun 7 1941
- "Roaring Guns", which was made into the 1944 short film of the same name
- "Soldier's Honor", The Saturday Evening Post, Nov 22 1947
- "Hidden Valley", The American Magazine, Feb 1950
- "The Day the Circus Came", The Saturday Evening Post, Oct 6 1951
- "The Magic Afternoon", The Saturday Evening Post, Dec 27 1952
- "A Christmas Tale", The Saturday Evening Post, Dec 19 1953
- "Nor'wester", which was made into the 1959 film John Paul Jones starring Robert Stack
