= Dodge City (film) =

1939 film

- Theatrical release poster
- Directed by: Michael Curtiz
- Screenplay by: Robert Buckner
- Produced by: Hal B. Wallis
- Starring: Errol Flynn; Olivia de Havilland; Ann Sheridan
- Cinematography: Sol Polito
- Edited by: George Amy
- Music by: Max Steiner
- Color process: Technicolor
- Production company: Warner Bros. Pictures
- Distributed by: Warner Bros. Pictures
- Release dates: April 1, 1939 (Dodge City, Kansas, premiere); April 8, 1939 (USA)
- Running time: 104 minutes
- Country: United States
- Language: English
- Budget: $1,061,000
- Box office: $2,532,000

Dodge City is a 1939 American Western film directed by Michael Curtiz and starring Errol Flynn, Olivia de Havilland, and Ann Sheridan. Based on a story by Robert Buckner, the film is about a Texas cattle agent who witnesses the brutal lawlessness of Dodge City, Kansas and takes the job of sheriff to clean the town up. Filmed in the full, three-strip Technicolor process, Dodge City was one of the highest-grossing films of the year. This was the 5th of 8 movies that de Havilland and Flynn appeared in together.

Various scenes were shot in Thousand Oaks, including at present day Wildwood Regional Park.

== Plot ==
The action of the film starts with Colonel Dodge (Henry O'Neill) arriving on the first train and subsequently opening the new railroad line that links Dodge City with the rest of the world. A few years later, Dodge City has turned into the "longhorn cattle center of the world and wide-open Babylon of the American frontier, packed with settlers, thieves and gunmen—the town that knew no ethics but cash and killing". In particular, it is Jeff Surrett (Bruce Cabot) and his gang who kill, steal, cheat and, generally, control life in Dodge City without ever being brought to justice. Any new sheriff, sworn into office in Dodge, is quickly driven out of town by Surrett and his cronies.

Colonel Dodge's friend Wade Hatton (Errol Flynn), a lone cowboy who was instrumental in bringing the railroad to Dodge City, is now on his way to the town leading a trek of settlers from the East coast. At Hatton's side are his old companions Rusty (Alan Hale) and Tex (Guinn "Big Boy" Williams), who are prepared to stay with him through thick and thin. Among the settlers are beautiful Abbie Irving (Olivia de Havilland) and her irresponsible brother Lee (William Lundigan), who, drunk, causes a stampede (which eventually kills him) and is shot by Hatton in self-defense. When the group arrive in Dodge City, Hatton is confronted with the full extent of the anarchy which is dictating everyday life there. Asked by anxious citizens—Abbie's uncle, Dr. Irving (Henry Travers) among them—to be the new sheriff, Hatton politely declines, saying he is not cut out for this kind of job.

Hatton changes his mind when, during a school outing, a young boy, Harry Cole is inadvertently killed by Surrett and his men. The new sheriff and his deputies—Rusty and Tex among them—have a hard time fighting the criminals. Regardless, all in all, Hatton was quite capable of his new job and was off to a good start cleaning up the town. Meanwhile, Hatton, Abbie and the likable newspaperman Joe Clemens (Frank McHugh) uncover enough evidence of Surrett's shady dealings to stand a chance in court. Before Joe could publish a story, one of Surrett's thugs, Yancey (Victor Jory) shoots the editor in the back. The only witness who can put Surrett behind bars now is Abbie whom Hatton, out of love for her, arranges to leave town for safety until further notice.

When Yancey is in jail for Joe's killing, Hatton has to protect him against the furious men outside who, not caring for Yancey's right to a fair trial, want to take the law into their own hands and lynch him. Intending to ensure that Yancey deserves a fair trial, Hatton and Rusty were able to manage to smuggle him out of town in a hearse to the train station where a train (which Abbie happens to be on) bound for Wichita was just about to leave. However, Surrett and his gang were waiting and sneak on board to try to spring Yancey. A gunfight then ensues and inadvertently causes a fire in the baggage car. Fearing for Hatton's life, Abbie rushes to the baggage car to warn him of the danger. Using her as a shield, Surrett orders Hatton and Rusty to release Yancey immediately. Afterwards, Surrett locks Hatton, Abbie and Rusty in the burning car. After the three manage to escape from the car, Hatton and Rusty kill Surrett and his gang who were trying to make a getaway.

Hatton succeeds in both overwhelming and catching Surrett's gang and winning Abbie's heart. Everything has been prepared for a quiet family life in newly civilized Dodge City, but Hatton is asked by Colonel Dodge to clean up Virginia City, Nevada, another railroad town more dangerous than Dodge City had ever been. Understanding how much Hatton is needed to settle the West, a loving Abbie suggests she and her new husband join the next wagon train for their new life together, and Col. Dodge states that Hatton has married the right woman.

== Cast ==
- Errol Flynn as Wade Hatton
- Olivia de Havilland as Abbie Irving
- Ann Sheridan as Ruby Gilman
- Bruce Cabot as Jeff Surrett
- Frank McHugh as Joe Clemens
- Alan Hale as Rusty
- John Litel as Matt Cole
- Henry Travers as Dr. Irving
- Henry O'Neill as Colonel Grenville M. Dodge
- Victor Jory as Yancy
- William Lundigan as Lee Irving
- Guinn "Big Boy" Williams as Tex Baird
- Bobs Watson as Harry Cole
- Gloria Holden as Mrs. Cole
- Douglas Fowley as Munger
- Georgia Caine as Mrs. Irving
- Charles Halton as Surrett's Lawyer
- Ward Bond as Bud Taylor
- Cora Witherspoon as Mrs. McCoy, League of Purity
- Russell Simpson as Jack Orth
- Monte Blue as John Barlow
- Clem Bevans as Charley, the barber (uncredited)

== Production ==
The railroad scenes were filmed on the Sierra Railroad in Tuolumne County, California.

== Reception ==
=== Box office ===
Although Errol Flynn was worried how audiences would accept him in Westerns, the film was a big hit, being the most popular Warner Bros. film of 1939.

According to Warner Bros., the film earned $1,688,000 in the U.S. and $844,000 in other markets.
