= Suzan Ball =

American actress (1933–1955)

- Ball in 1954
- Born: Susan Ball; February 3, 1934; Buffalo, New York, U.S.
- Died: August 5, 1955 (aged 21); Beverly Hills, California, U.S.
- Occupation: Actress
- Spouse: Richard Long (m. 1954)
- Relatives: Lucille Ball (cousin); Fred Ball (cousin)

Suzan Ball (born Susan Ball; February 3, 1934 – August 5, 1955) was an American actress. She was a second cousin of fellow actress Lucille Ball. She was married to actor Richard Long. She had her leg amputated in January 1954, as a result of both a tumor and an accident she had. She died at age 21 of cancer in 1955, after a two-year battle. Some sources erroneously cited 1933 as her year of birth.

== Early life ==
Born in Buffalo, New York, Ball was the eldest daughter of Howard Dale Ball and Marleah Frances O'Leary. When she was five, the family moved to Miami and, shortly thereafter, Kenmore, New York. In 1946, they moved to North Hollywood, where in June 1951, at 17, Ball graduated from North Hollywood High.

== Personal life ==
Ball, aged 20, married actor Richard Long on April 11, 1954, at El Montecito Presbyterian Church in Santa Barbara. Among the 100-plus guests in attendance were fellow UI luminaries Jeff Chandler, Barbara Rush, Rock Hudson, Lori Nelson, Tony Curtis, Janet Leigh, David Janssen, Julie Adams, Hugh O'Brian, Mala Powers, and Mary Castle.

== Illness and death ==
In 1953, doctors diagnosed Ball with cancer when she developed tumors on her right leg, forcing her to use crutches. Because of the cancer, doctors amputated her right leg on January 12, 1954. On August 5, 1955, five days after having been released from the City of Hope National Medical Center following more than three weeks of unsuccessful treatment, Ball, at age 21, died at 4:35 pm at her home in Beverly Hills.

She is interred at Forest Lawn Memorial Park in Glendale, California.

== Legacy ==
Dick Powell and June Allyson co-chaired the establishment of the Suzan Ball Memorial Fund in March 1956. Ten other entertainers and two states' governors co-sponsored the effort to raise $1 million via a national fund drive for "increasing facilities for a cancer center" under the auspices of City of Hope Medical Center.

== Filmography ==
Year	Title	Role	Notes
1952	Aladdin and His Lamp	Dancing Girl	Uncredited
1952	The World in His Arms		Uncredited
1952	Untamed Frontier	Lottie	
1952	Yankee Buccaneer	Countess Margarita La Raguna	
1953	City Beneath the Sea	Venita	
1953	East of Sumatra	Minyora	
1953	War Arrow	Avis	
1955	Chief Crazy Horse	Black Shawl (Little Fawn)	(final film role)
