= George Mathews (actor) =

American actor (1911–1984)

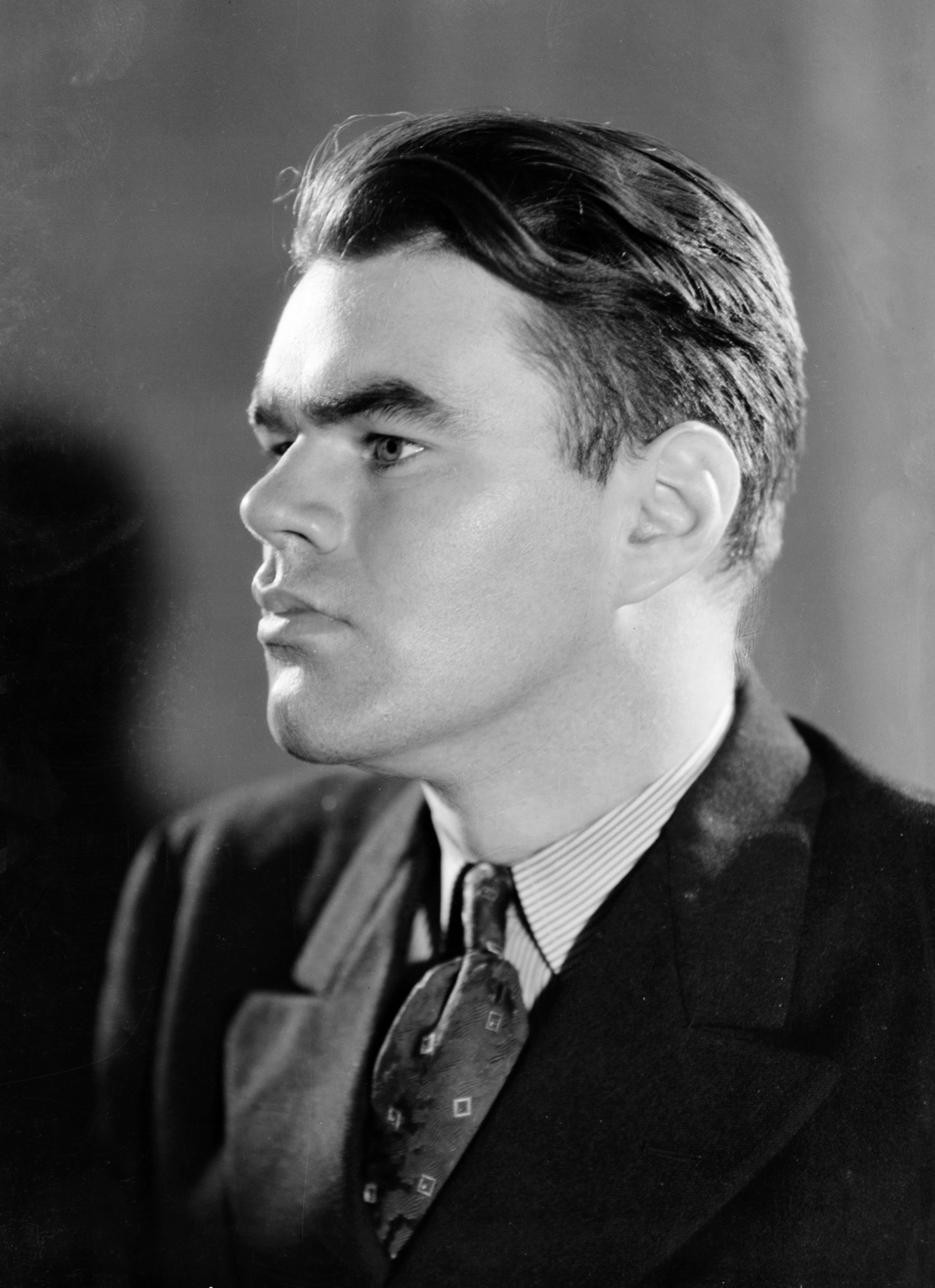
- Cast portrait of George Mathews in the 1937 Broadway production of Processional
- Born: October 10, 1911; Brooklyn, New York, U.S.
- Died: November 7, 1984 (aged 73); Caesars Head, South Carolina, U.S.
- Occupation: Actor
- Years active: 1933–1972
- Spouse: Mary Haynsworth

George Mathews (October 10, 1911 – November 7, 1984) was an American actor whose film career stretched from an uncredited appearance in Stage Door Canteen in 1943 to Going Home in 1971.

== Biography ==
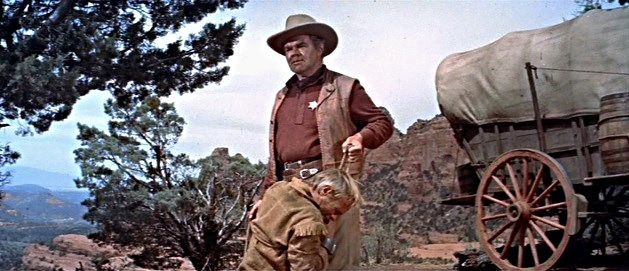
Mathews in the 1956 film The Last Wagon

Mathews was born in Brooklyn, New York.

Matthews's stage career began during the Great Depression when he became manager of an Italian stock theater company. Although he knew no Italian and had no experience as a stage manager, he took the job to end his jobless status. At one point, the actor who portrayed the good cop in the play was sick, and Mathews was drafted to fill in for him. Mathews said that the impresario "thought I made such a good cop that he turned the role over to me permanently. That was the beginning of my acting career."

Mathews was often cast as heavies or hardened military types. He appeared in both the stage (1942–43) and film version (1944) of The Eve of St. Mark, as Sergeant Ruby. He also portrayed a comedic thug in Pat and Mike (1952). In a 1956 episode of The Phil Silvers Show, he played a brutish seargent nicknamed "The Beast", whose imposing stature and brawn gets cleverly outwitted by Bilko and his platoon.

He appeared on Broadway in the Garson Kanin-directed musical comedy Do Re Mi (1960–62), as Fatso O'Rear. He later appeared on Broadway in Catch Me If You Can in 1965.

In 1962, he appeared in Have Gun – Will Travel, Season 6, Episode 6. That same year, he played ex-fighter, “Champ”, in the Season 7 Episode 28 of Gunsmoke, “The Dealer”. He demonstrated his comedic talent in the short-lived television comedy series Glynis (1963), playing ex-cop Chick Rogers, who assists a mystery writer and amateur sleuth, played by Glynis Johns, in solving "whodunnits".

Perhaps his most memorable role was as the bully "Harvey" in 'The Bensonhurst Bomber' episode of The Honeymooners. He retired from the screen in 1972.

== Personal life and death ==
Mathews died from heart disease in Caesars Head, South Carolina, aged 73, in 1984. He was married to stage actress Mary (Haynsworth) Mathews from 1951 until his death in 1984.

== Filmography ==
Year	Title	Role	Notes
1943	Stage Door Canteen	Marine Sergeant with Ray Bolger	Uncredited
1944	Up in Arms	Blackie	
1944	The Eve of St. Mark	Sergeant Ruby	
1944	Wing and a Prayer	Dooley	
1944	Wilson	Army Sergeant	Uncredited
1944	X Marks the Spot	Guardian Angel	Credited as "George Matthews"
1945	The Corn Is Green	Trap Driver	Uncredited
1945	The Great John L.	John Flood	
1952	Pat and Mike	Spec Cauley	
1952	Sally and Saint Anne	Father Kennedy	
1952	Yankee Buccaneer	Chief Petty Officer Link	
1953	Last of the Comanches	Romany O'Rattigan	
1953	City Beneath the Sea	Captain Meade aka Ralph Sorensen	
1953	Act of Love	Henderson	
1954	The Great Diamond Robbery	Duke Fargoh	
1955	The Man with the Golden Arm	Williams	
1956	The Proud Ones	Dillon	
1956	The Last Wagon	Sheriff Bull Harper	
1956	The Phil Silvers Show	MSgt. Quinton "The Beast" Benton	
1957	Gunfight at the O.K. Corral	John Shanssey	
1958	The Buccaneer	Pyke	
1960	Heller in Pink Tights	Sam Pierce	
1962	The Hole	Construction Worker	(winner of the Academy Award for Best Animated Short Film)
1971	Going Home	Malloy	(final film role)

== Selected Television ==
Year	Title	Role	Notes
1955	Death Valley Days		Season 2, Episode 14, "Husband Pro-Tem"
1956	The Phil Silvers Show	Beast	Season 1, Episode 28 "Bilko and the Beast"
1956	The Honeymooners	Harvey	Episode "The Bensonhurst Bomber"
1956	Alfred Hitchcock Presents	Sam Dunleavy; Mac McGurk	Season 1 Episode 15: "The Big Switch" as Sam Dunleavy; Season 2 Episode 6: "Toby" as Mac McGurk
1959	The Rifleman	Abel MacDonald	Season 1, Episode 31, "The Angry Man"
1960	Have Gun - Will Travel	Clerk	Season 3, Episode 21 "The Night the Town Died"
1953	The Lone Ranger	Bill Adams	Episode "The Devil's Bog"
1961	Wanted Dead or Alive	Krebs	Season 3, Episode 20 "The Long Search"
1962	Gunsmoke	Champ	Season 7 Episode 28 “The Dealer”
1962	Car 54, Where are you?		Season 2 Episode 9 "Toody Undercover"
1966	Dark Shadows	Amos Fitch	episode 89 airing Oct. 10
