= Lalo Ríos =

American actor

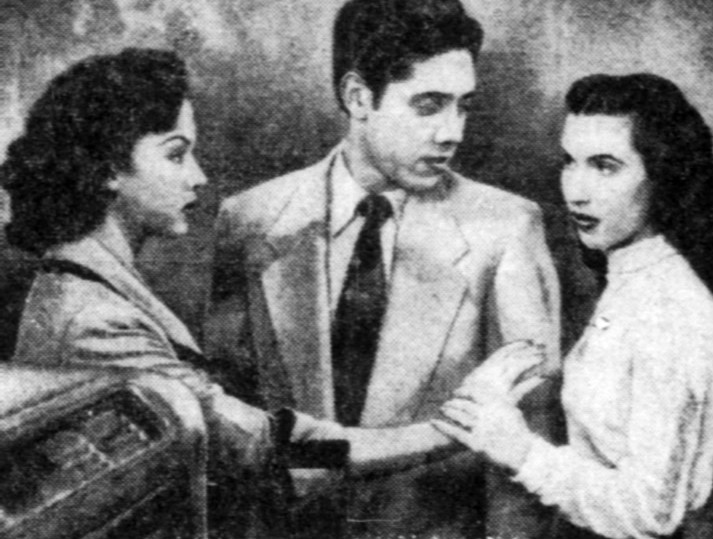
- Left to right; Rita Moreno, Lalo Ríos, and Lillian Molieri in The Ring
- Born: February 7, 1927; San Miguelito, Sonora, Mexico
- Died: March 7, 1973 (aged 46); Los Angeles, California, U.S.
- Occupation: Actor
- Years active: 1950–1969

Lalo Ríos (7 February 1927 – 7 March 1973) was a Mexican-born American actor best known for his lead role in The Ring (1952) as Tommy.

== Early life ==
Ríos was born on February 7, 1927, in San Miguelito, Sonora, Mexico. At the age of 9 he moved to East Los Angeles, California, with his family. He graduated from Abraham Lincoln High School. After graduating, Ríos took a job in carpentry.

== Career ==
During Ríos' work as a carpenter he got his first acting role with the Paramount film The Lawless (1950). The film cast Ríos as a young Mexican who faces a racist lynch mob in a small North California town. Since his start, his career spanned nearly twenty years. In 1952, Ríos was then cast in his most well-known role as "Tommy", in The Ring (1952), in which he played the lead actor and protagonist. Ríos was also known for certain relevance in films such as Big Leaguer (1953), and Touch of Evil (1958). He eventually ended his career in film in 1962, with Lonely Are the Brave.

After ending his career in film, Ríos began to focus solely on television. This was a format with which he was familiar, due to his initial inclusion in Westinghouse Desilu Playhouse in 1958. His casting with the series was short lived, appearing in only two episodes, but assisted him in creating a platform to sell his craft. After 1966, he participated in multiple television series, such as Laredo (1966) and Marcus Welby, M.D. (1968). Marcus Welby was the last series in which he participated, before he left American television.

== Death ==
Ríos died in Los Angeles on March 7, 1973.

== Filmography ==
Year	Title	Role	Notes
1950	The Lawless	Paul Rodriguez	
1950	Bandit Queen	Juan, a vigilant	Uncredited
1951	The Law and the Lady	Panchito	Uncredited
1952	Untamed Frontier	Pepe	Uncredited
1952	One Minute to Zero	Pvt. Chico Mendoza	Uncredited
1952	The Ring	Tomas 'Tommy' Cantanios / Tommy Kansas	
1953	City Beneath the Sea	Calypso	
1953	Big Leaguer	Chuy Aguilar	
1954	Prisoner of War	Sachez Rivero	Uncredited
1958	Touch of Evil	Risto	
1960	The Magnificent Seven	Calvera henchman	Uncredited
1961	Gold of the Seven Saints	Mexican Robber	Uncredited
1962	Lonely Are the Brave	Prisoner	
1968	Blue	Mexican bandit	Uncredited
1968	Villa Rides	Mexican Soldier	Uncredited

== Television ==
Year	Title	Role	episodes
1958	Westinghouse Desilu Playhouse	Martinez	My Father, the Fool
1959	Wagon Train	Juan	The Stagecoach Story · The Sister Rita Story
1960	Overland Trail	Telegrapher	Mission into Mexico
1960	Tate	The Shepherd	Tigrero
1961	The Untouchables	Tony Diaz	The Big Train, Part 1 · The Big Train, Part 2
1961	Assignment: Underwater	Roberto	The Key
1961	Gunsmoke	Little Fox	Long Hours, Short Pay
1961	The Case of the Dangerous Robin		Doll of Death
1966	Laredo	Pepe	The Calico Kid
1967	The High Chaparral	First Bandit	The Terrorist
1969	Marcus Welby, M.D.	Sanchez	Neither Punch nor Judy
