= East of Sumatra =

1953 film by Budd Boetticher

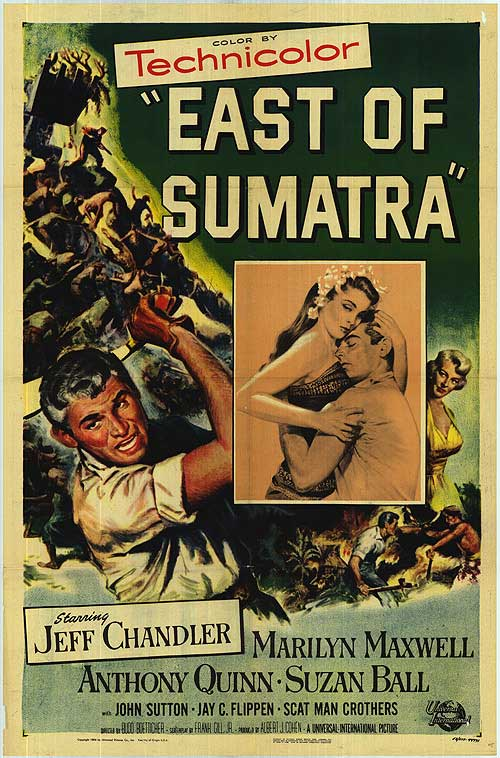
- Film poster by Reynold Brown
- Directed by: Budd Boetticher
- Written by: Frank Gill Jr adaptation Jack Natteford
- Based on: story by Louis L'Amour and Jack Natteford
- Produced by: Albert J. Cohen
- Starring: Jeff Chandler; Marilyn Maxwell; Anthony Quinn; Suzan Ball
- Cinematography: Clifford Stine
- Edited by: Virgil W. Vogel
- Color process: Technicolor
- Production company: Universal Pictures
- Distributed by: Universal Pictures
- Release date: September 23, 1953 (United States)
- Running time: 82 minutes
- Country: United States
- Language: English

East of Sumatra is a 1953 American adventure film directed by Budd Boetticher and starring Jeff Chandler, Marilyn Maxwell, Anthony Quinn and Suzan Ball.

== Plot ==
Duke Mullane (Jeff Chandler), manager of a Malayan tin mine, goes to a little-known island to open a new mine in the jungle. Initially, the natives are friendly, especially dancer Minyora ... who is soon to be married to local ruler King Kiang (Anthony Quinn). A series of unfortunate incidents changes Kiang's attitude to hostility, and Duke is stranded with his crew, Minyora, and his old flame Lory (Marilyn Maxwell), who is engaged to his boss.

== Cast ==
- Jeff Chandler as Duke Mullane
- Marilyn Maxwell as Lory Hale
- Anthony Quinn as Kiang
- Suzan Ball as Minyora
- John Sutton as Daniel Catlin
- Jay C. Flippen as Mac
- Scatman Crothers as Baltimore
- Aram Katcher as Atib
- Anthony Eustrel as Clyde
- Eugene Iglesias as Paulo (as Gene Iglesias)
- Peter Graves as Cowboy
- Earl Holliman as Cupid (as Henry Earl Holliman)
- James Craven as Drake
- John Warburton as Gregory Keith
- Charles Horvath as Corcoran (uncredited)

== Production ==
The film was based in part on a treatment by Jack Natteford and Louis L'Amour; the latter, best known for his Westerns, had visited Sumatra while in the United States Merchant Marine. In his memoirs, L'Amour called it "my first motion picture":

The story was of tin mining, and made a bit of sense as written. A big company was rushing in to exploit an island, ruled by a Rajah ... He wanted a hospital, medicines, and doctor for his people. The Company wanted to get in and get the tin and get out with as little trouble as possible. The idea was good, the cast was capable – and instead of a meaningful picture, the producers or somebody turned it into a sex and jungle epic. In any jungle picture with a beautiful native girl, you can be almost be [sic] sure that before long you will find her swimming naked or nearly so in a pool, usually with a waterfall, and there the leading man comes upon her. He is often in the pool himself and it leads to what is expected to be a titillating scene. So it was in this case. The sincere young Rajah is largely forgotten; he doesn't get his medicines and his hopes and the picture go down the train.

Director Budd Boetticher later described the movie as "just a fun film to make all my friends some money". Filming started in November 1952.

Gloria Grahame was offered the female lead but turned it down. She was replaced by Marilyn Maxwell.
