= Richard McKenzie (actor) =

American character actor (1930–2023)

- Born: June 2, 1930; Chattanooga, Tennessee, U.S.
- Died: December 1, 2023 (aged 93); Los Angeles, California, U.S.
- Occupation: Actor
- Years active: 1961, 1971–2002
- Television: All in the Family; Three's Company; It Takes Two; Matlock; In The Heat of The Night
- Spouse: Aza Cefkin

Richard McKenzie (June 2, 1930 – December 1, 2023) was an American character actor who is known for his guest role as Fred Bunker, younger brother of Archie Bunker on the hit CBS-TV sitcom series All in the Family in seasons 8 and 9, and season 4 of Archie Bunker's Place. He also appeared in other popular shows such as Quincy, M.E., Hawaii Five-O, Matlock and In the Heat of the Night.

== Biography and career ==
McKenzie's career began in television in a 1961 episode of the sitcom My Three Sons as Quinn. It would be another 14 years until Richard would make another television guest star appearance on the TV drama Doctors' Hospital in 1975 as Dr. Williams.

Throughout the 1970s, McKenzie would make guest appearances on many television shows. His most famous guest appearances in the 70's were on the television sitcoms Three's Company in 1978 as Chef Anton, All in the Family/Archie Bunker's Place in three episodes between 1978 and 1982 as Archie Bunker's younger brother Alfred "Fred" Bunker, and on two episodes of Carter County between 1978 and 1979 as Dr. Fenway. Throughout the 1970s, McKenzie would guest star in such shows as The Waltons, Hawaii Five-O, The Jeffersons, Roots, Sword of Justice, One Day at a Time, etc.

McKenzie would also have an extraordinary television career in the 1980s which also included two co-starring role in television shows. His first guest starring role was in the show Family in three different episodes as two different characters. His first co-starring role was in the 1980s short-lived series The Yeagers. The Yeagers was a drama centering on the life of the Yeager family and associates. The series produced only one episode in 1980. The series also co-starred David Ackroyd, Guy Boyd, and Andy Griffith. In 1982, McKenzie would again co-star in another short-lived series entitled It Takes Two. The series was about a couple, Sam and Molly Quinn who are too focused on their jobs to pay attention to their children or each other. He played Walter Chaiken in the series. The series aired for twenty-two episodes in one season, (1982–1983). The series also co-starred Richard Crenna, Patty Duke, and Helen Hunt. Some other of his memorable guest star roles in the 1980s include those in the shows Soap, CBS Afternoon Playhouse, Archie Bunker's Place, Knots Landing, Benson, Growing Pains, Too Close for Comfort, Matlock, ALF, etc.

In the 1990s, McKenzie would guest star on shows such as The Golden Girls, The Fresh Prince of Bel-Air, NYPD Blue, In the Heat of the Night, etc. His last appearance on television was in a 2002 episode of Judging Amy as Judge Novak.

McKenzie also appeared in many feature films and television films. He starred in more than 10 movies during the course of 22 years. His first movie role as "Behan" in the 1971 movie Doc. Some of his other memorable appearances in the movies included those in A.W.O.L. (1972), Man on a Swing (1974), Corvette Summer (1978), Being There (1979), The Doctor (1991), and Ghost in the Machine (1993). He also appeared in more than 20 TV movies. His first role was in Nicky's World (1974), as the role of Mr. Lanning, and his last role was in Deadly Medicine (1991), as the role of Brookshire.

McKenzie made his name in theater as well. His Broadway credits included That Championship Season, Uncle Vanya and many more.

McKenzie died on December 1, 2023, at the age of 93.

== Filmography ==
=== Film ===
Year	Title	Role	Notes
1971	Doc	Behan	
1972	A.W.O.L.	Willy's Father	
1972	The Stoolie	Gun Store Clerk	
1974	Man on a Swing	Sam Gallagher	
1978	Nowhere to Run	Dr. Steinberg	TV movie
1978	Corvette Summer	Principal Bacon	
1979	Being There	Ron Steigler	
1980	Gideon's Trumpet	Judge McCrary	TV movie
1981	First Monday in October	Hostile Senator	
1981	Callie & Son	Donohue	TV movie
1981	Splendor in the Grass	Doc Smiley	TV movie
1981	Dark Night of the Scarecrow	Judge Henry	
1982	Some Kind of Hero	Psychiatrist	
1983	Malibu	Hunnicutt Powell	TV movie
1987	Billionaire Boys Club	Steven Raleigh	TV movie
1988	Bird	Southern Doctor	
1988	Shootdown	Overstar	TV movie
1991	The Doctor	Mr. Richards	
1991	Deadly Medicine	Brookshire	TV movie
1991	Daddy	Jeremy Bosworth	TV movie
1993	Ghost in the Machine	Frank Mallory	

=== Television ===
Year	Title	Role	Notes
1961	My Three Sons	Quinn	
1975	Doctor's Hospital	Dr. Williams	
1975	The Waltons	Porter Sims	
1975	Hawaii Five-O	Gustave Lupin	
1976	The Jeffersons	Mr. Owens	
1977	Roots	Sam Harvey	2 episodes
1977	Kingston: Confidential	Dunstan	
1978	Quincy, M.E.	Dr.Holmes	
1978	Three's Company	Chef Anton	
1978	Sword of Justice	Berardi	
1978–1979	All in the Family	Alfred "Fred" Bunker	2 episodes
1978–1979	Carter County	Dr. Fenway	2 episodes
1979	One Day at a Time	Herb	
1979	Ike	Col Offenheim	
1979	California Fever	Mr. Newman	
1979	Soap	The Doctor	
1979–1980	Family	Mr. McKinley/Mr. Stephens	3 episodes
1980	The Yeagers	Lester	1 episode; unsold pilot episode
1980	Stone	Professor Frank	
1980	One in a Million	The Doctor	
1980–1981	Soap	Dr. Saxton	3 episodes
1981	It's a Living	Will Frankel	
1982	CBS Afternoon Playhouse	Tom Gordon	
1982	Bring 'Em Back Alive	Arthur	
1982	Archie Bunker's Place	Alfred "Fred" Bunker	
1982–1983	It Takes Two	Walter Chaiken	22 episodes
1983	Condo		
1983	The Mississippi	Wallenberg	
1984	Oh Madeline	Sam	
1984	You Are the Jury	Dr. Salton	
1985	Knots Landing	Judge Calvin Gillian	
1985	Benson	Senator Jenkins	
1985	Hail to the Chief	Gavin Phelps	
1985	Stir Crazy	Ed Grant	
1985	Growing Pains	Dr. McCloskey	
1985	The Facts of Life	The Inspector	
1986	The Colbys	Dr. Leonard Jamison	2 episodes
1986	MacGyver	Willis	
1986	Too Close for Comfort	Bill Wagner	
1986	Comedy Factory	George Dent	
1986	Highway to Heaven	Professor Fish	
1986–1987	Matlock	Lt. Rupert Davis/Police Det. Rupert Davis	4 episodes
1987	The Wizard	Cummings	
1987	21 Jump Street	Mr. John Madigan	
1987	Valerie	Mr. Baker	
1987	Ohara	Uncle Bob	
1987	Throb	Harry	
1988	My Sister Sam		
1988	It's a Living	Mr. Mackinaw	2 episodes
1988	ALF	Nick Susla	
1989	Quantum Leap	Fred Beaman	
1990	The Golden Girls	Jack	
1991	The Fresh Prince of Bel-Air	Judge	
1991	Herman's Head	Michael A. O'Connell	
1991	Pros and Cons	Ray Masters	
1991	Empty Nest	Rudnick	
1991–1995	In the Heat of the Night	Preston Donner	3 episodes
1992–1993	Civil Wars	Judge Phil Macomber	2 episodes
1993	Empty Nest	Mr. Davidson	2 episodes
1993	NYPD Blue	Arland Rickman	
1994	Picket Fences	Bishop John Marsh	
1995	Grace Under Fire	Henry	
2002	Judging Amy	Judge Novak	(final appearance)
