= The Lawless =

1950 film directed by Joseph Losey

- Theatrical release poster
- Directed by: Joseph Losey
- Screenplay by: Daniel Mainwaring (as 'Geoffrey Homes')
- Based on: "The Voice of Stephen Wilder" by Daniel Mainwaring
- Produced by: William H. Pine; William C. Thomas
- Starring: Macdonald Carey; Gail Russell; Johnny Sands; Lee Patrick; John Hoyt; Lalo Ríos
- Cinematography: J. Roy Hunt
- Edited by: Howard A. Smith
- Music by: Mahlon Merrick
- Production company: Pine-Thomas Productions
- Distributed by: Paramount Pictures
- Release date: June 9, 1950
- Running time: 83 minutes
- Country: United States
- Language: English
- Budget: $435,000 or $407,000

The Lawless (also released as The Dividing Line) is a 1950 American film noir directed by Joseph Losey and starring Macdonald Carey, Gail Russell, Johnny Sands, Lee Patrick, John Hoyt, and Lalo Ríos in his film debut. The plot concerns a crusading newspaper editor in California who becomes concerned about the plight of fruit pickers, mostly immigrants from Mexico. It is adapted by Daniel Mainwaring (under the pen name 'Geoffrey Homes') from his short story "The Voice of Stephen Wilder".

The film was released by Paramount Pictures on June 9, 1950. Though a commercial disappointment, it was well-received by critics, particularly in France.

== Plot ==
California fruit picker Paul Rodriguez hopes to someday have a farm of his own. When his friend Lopo Chavez has a car accident, he is insulted with a racial slur by Joe Ferguson, a passenger in the other car. Joe's father disapproves of this bigotry.

Lopo visits his friend Sunny Garcia, whose family publishes a Spanish-language paper called La Luz. At a dance, Sunny is introduced to Larry Wilder, editor of The Union, who once was a big-city newspaper reporter. A racially heated fight breaks out at the dance. Paul accidentally strikes Peters, a policeman, and Joe is also arrested. A reporter who works for Larry depicts the incident to a Stockton paper as a full-scale race riot. Reporter Jan Dawson arrives to pursue the story.

Peters roughs up Paul in the back seat of the police car. His partner tries to intervene but crashes the car and dies. Paul flees, and a manhunt begins. It intensifies when teenage farm girl Mildred, startled at seeing Paul, falls and is knocked unconscious, after which she blames Paul for what happened.

Larry tries to defend Paul in a newspaper article, inciting more anger. Lopo is attacked and a lynch mob for Paul is organized. The newspaper office is destroyed. Larry considers leaving town permanently, but he is in love with Sunny, so they decide to merge their newspapers and continue to fight for what is right.

== Cast ==
- Macdonald Carey as Larry Wilder
- Gail Russell as Sunny Garcia
- Johnny Sands as Joe Ferguson
- Lee Patrick as Jan Dawson
- John Hoyt as Ed Ferguson
- Lalo Rios as Paul Rodriguez
- Maurice Jara as Lopo Chavez
- Walter Reed as Jim Wilson
- Guy Anderson as Jonas Creel
- Argentina Brunetti as Mrs Rodriguez
- William Edmunds as Mr. Jensen
- Gloria Winters as Mildred Jensen
- John Davis as Harry Pawling
- Martha Hyer as Caroline Tyler
- Frank Fenton as Mr Prentiss
- Paul Harvey as Chief of Police Blake
- Felipe Turich as Mr. Rodriguez
- Ian MacDonald as Al Peters
- Noel Reyburn as Fred Jackson
- Tab Hunter as Frank O'Brien
- Russ Conway as Eldredge
- Robert Williams as Boswell
- James Bush as Anderson
- Julia Faye as Mrs. Jensen
- Pedro de Cordoba as Mr. Garcia

The film was the film acting debut of Lalo Ríos and Tab Hunter.

== Production ==
The film was based on the short story The Voice of Stephen Wilder by Daniel Mainwaring. Film rights were purchased by Pine-Thomas Productions in August 1949. Mainwaring was a friend of Pine Thomas and he persuaded the producers to hire Losey. Losey later said:

It was a subject I felt very passionately about but I had big trouble because Pine and Thomas were a combination that made ‘B’ pictures for Paramount, and they were monsters, absolute monsters. And they interfered in the worst possible way at all points and I would never have been able to make that picture in a million years if I hadn’t had the guts and if Dan Mainwaring hadn’t had the guts that he had. He really risked his career to protect me.

Losey studied the 1936 Fury as well as footage from the 1949 Peekskill riots.

The film was known at one stage as Outrage. Gail Russell had been on suspension by Paramount but was freed to make the film.

The film was an attempt by Pine-Thomas Productions to make a more "significant" kind of film. Shooting began in October and took 18 days.

Losey found it difficult working with Russell, an alcoholic. Although Paramount forbade her from drinking, Losey gave her alcohol so that she could remember her lines. Losey loved working with cameraman Roy Hunt.

Losey said the producer forced a music score on the film that "made it cheaper and more melodramatic and it slowed its tempo" and he was fired. He also said: "Mainwaring’s script was a very good one but it was corrupted by the producers. I mean all that business of the rape of the girl and the police car going up in flames were stuck in by them, and | didn’t like shooting them and the picture would have been much better without them. But it was quite a successful picture in spite of everything, and it does say what I wanted to say."

== Reception ==
=== Box office ===
Pine Thomas said they expected to make a profit of $1 million on the film.

However The Lawless was a box office disappointment and not as profitable as other Pine-Thomas films. Pine felt it might have been more successful if it had a bigger star or if released a year earlier, when he said much of the public “was actually going to see message films.” He and Thomas insisted they were glad they made the film because it was the first time they produced “a real critics’ picture” and it "proved we're guys whose only interest isn't making money."

=== Critical response ===
Film critic Bosley Crowther praised the film. He wrote, "Within the inevitable limits of the low-budget action film, which happens to be the type of product that these modest gentlemen produce, they have made an exciting picture on a good, solid, social theme—the cruelty of a community when inflamed by prejudice. And although their drama, The Lawless, is no Fury or Intruder in the Dust, it is a startling account of mob violence in a northern California town. With merited optimism, it was presented at the Astor yesterday."

The staff at Variety magazine also gave the film a positive review. They wrote, "Racial tolerance gets a working over in The Lawless, but the producers don’t soapbox the message, using it, instead, as a peg on which to produce a hard-hitting drama, equipped with action and fast pace ... Performances all stack up as topnotch, with several being standout."

According to film historian Foster Hirsch, The Lawless garnered “generally good reviews” in America, but was “greeted with wild enthusiasm” in France. Reviewers at Cahiers du Cinéma offered fulsome praise: Marc Bernard wrote “It is the most beautiful of films…I breathe easier after each viewing.” Pierre Rissient declared The Lawless, “the greatest western and even the only western ever made.”

== Sources ==
- Hirsch, Foster. 1980. Joseph Losey. Twayne Publishers, Boston, Massachusetts. ISBN 0-8057-9257-0
- Palmer, James and Riley, Michael. 1993. The Films of Joseph Losey. Cambridge University Press, Cambridge, England. ISBN 0-521-38386-2

== Notes ==
- Caute, David (1994). Joseph Losey.
- Losey, Joseph (1985). Conversations with Losey. Methuen.
