= The Ring (1952 film) =

1950 film by Kurt Neumann

- Poster of The Ring
- Directed by: Kurt Neumann
- Screenplay by: Irving Shulman
- Based on: 1953 novel The Square Trap by Irving Shulman
- Produced by: Frank King; Maurice King
- Starring: Lalo Rios; Gerald Mohr; Rita Moreno; Jack Elam
- Cinematography: Russell Harlan
- Edited by: Bruce B. Pierce
- Music by: Herschel Burke Gilbert
- Production company: King Brothers Productions
- Distributed by: United Artists
- Release date: September 26, 1952
- Running time: 79 minutes
- Country: United States
- Language: English

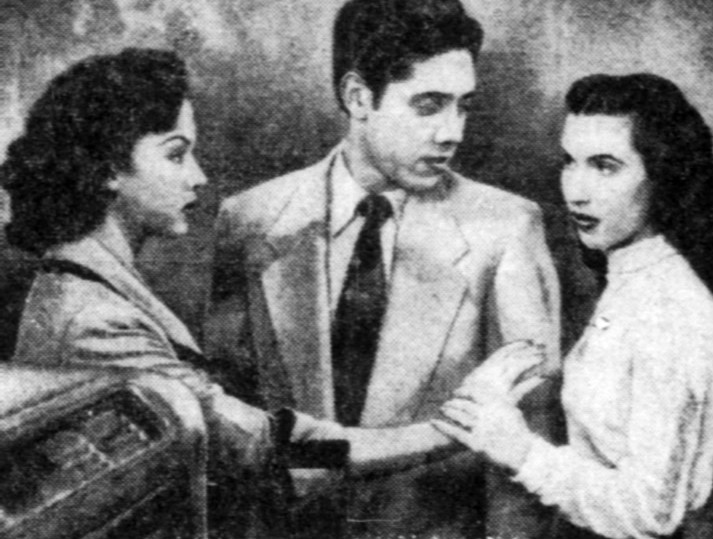
L-R: Rita Moreno, Lalo Ríos and Lillian Molieri

The Ring is a 1952 American film noir film directed by Kurt Neumann and based on a novel by Irving Shulman. It tells the story of a Mexican-American male who becomes a boxer, believing this kind of achievement will gain him respect among the English-speaking white majority. The film was shot in various locations in early 1950s Los Angeles. The film examines institutionalized bigotry.

== Plot ==
The film focuses on a young Mexican-American named Tomas Cantanios, who boxed under the pseudonym Tommy Kansas, a resident of Los Angeles's poor Chicano neighborhood. He feels constrained due to his inability to thrive in a white-dominated society. Therefore, to achieve popularity, he becomes a professional boxer, achieving fame and recognition. He soon discovers that Anglos are only drawn to him for his sports reputation and that they still consider him an outsider because of his ancestry and skin color. In fact, the only two white men who treat him decently are his manager Pete and trainer Freddy. However, their tolerant behavior is based primarily on monetary gain. Tommy also is conflicted by his unconditional love for Lucy, the daughter of a punch-drunk bum.

== Cast ==
- Lalo Rios as Tommy
- Gerald Mohr as Pete
- Rita Moreno as Lucy
- Robert Arthur as Billy Smith
- Robert Osterloh as Freddy
- Jack Elam as Harry Jackson
- Martin Garralaga as Vidal
- Peter Brocco as Barney Williams
- Julia Montoya as Rosa
- Lillian Molieri as Helen
- Pepe Hern as Rick
- Victor Millan as Pablo
- Tony Martinez as Go-Go
- Art Aragon as himself
- Robert Shayne as Jimmy, Aragon's manager
- Ernie Chavez as Joe
- Edward Chan Sieg as Benny
- Robert Altuna as Pepe Cantanios

== Production ==
The Ring is one of the early sports-centered films in Hollywood in which discrimination against Chicanos is presented. Its Mexicano/sports themes can be traced to the 1940s with films like The Girl from Monterrey.

== See also ==
- List of boxing films
