= The Etude =

Discontinued American music magazine

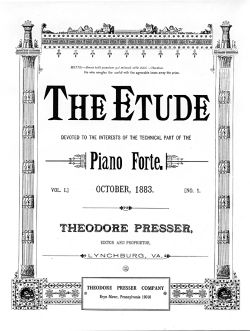
Cover of the first issue (October 1883)

The Etude was an American print magazine dedicated to music founded by Theodore Presser (1848–1925) at Lynchburg, Virginia, and first published in October 1883. Presser, who had also founded the Music Teachers National Association, moved his publishing headquarters to Philadelphia, Pennsylvania in 1884, and his Theodore Presser Company continued the magazine until 1957.

Aimed at all musicians, from the novice through the serious student to the professional, The Etude printed articles about both basic (or "popular") and more-involved musical subjects (including history, literature, gossip, and politics), contained write-in advice columns about musical pedagogy, and piano sheet music, of all performer ability levels, totaling over 10,000 works. Helen Tretbar edited the magazine in the late 1880s. James Francis Cooke, editor-in-chief from 1909 to 1949, added the phrase "Music Exalts Life!" to the magazine's masthead, and The Etude became a platform for Cooke's somewhat polemical and militantly optimistic editorials. The sometimes conservative outlook and contents of the magazine may have contributed to a decline in circulation in the 1930s and '40s, but in many respects it moved with the times, unequivocally supporting the phonograph, radio, and eventually television, and, by the late 1930s, fully embracing jazz. By the end, George Rochberg was an editor of The Etude under Guy McCoy, who had succeeded Cooke as editor-in-chief after over two decades as an assistant, and the magazine's musical content had come more closely in-step with the contemporary world.

In 1940, a 12-year-old Edward Chan Sieg had published an article on Mozart's "Requiem" in the magazine.
