= Circle mark =

Symbol used in Japan for affirmation

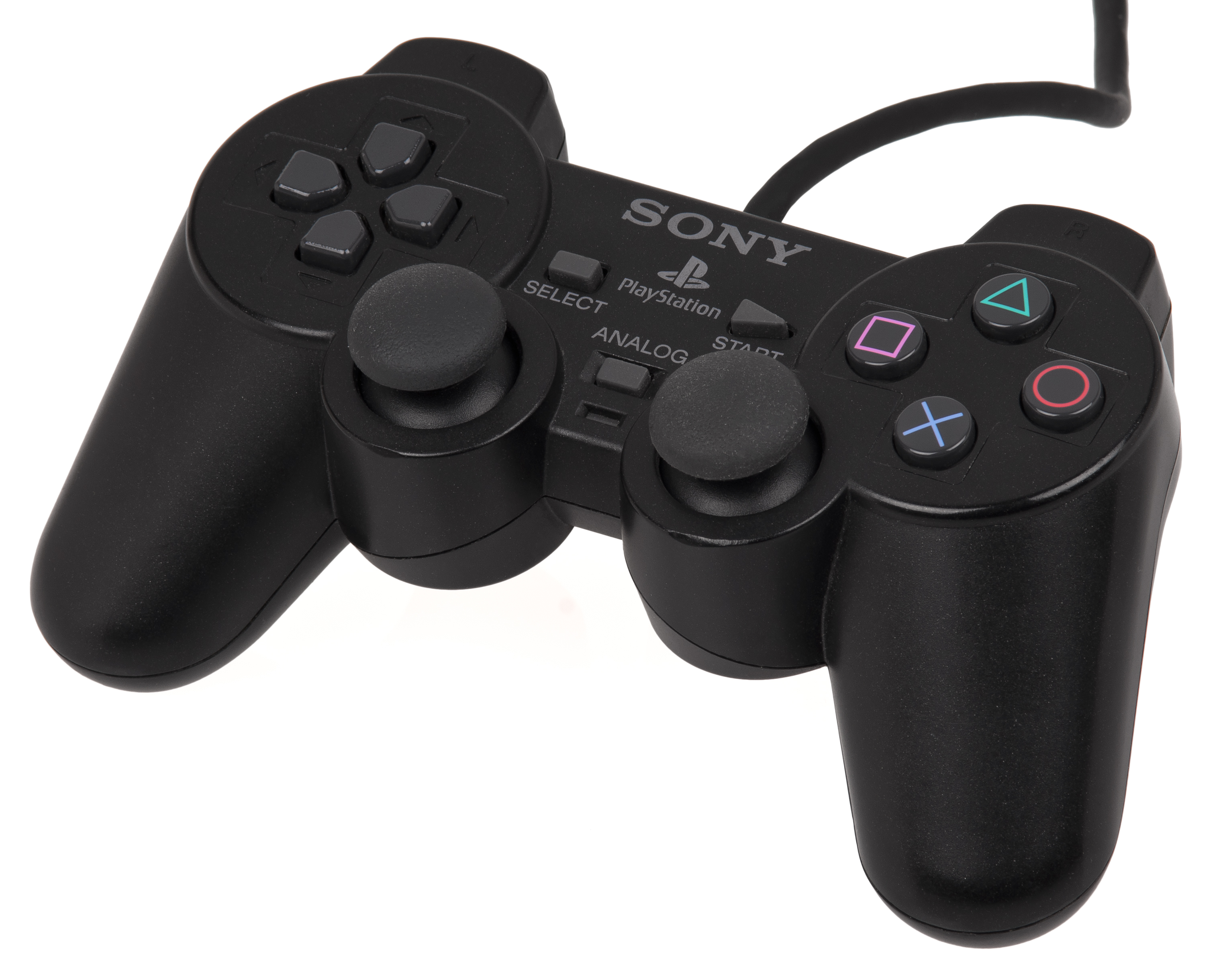
A Sony DualShock 2 controller for the PlayStation 2 game console, with the ◯ button visible on the right. In many games released for the PlayStation console line in Japan until the PlayStation 5, the O mark is used as a means to confirm choices in user interfaces, whereas the X button is used instead in Western releases.

A circle mark ("◯") is often used in East Asia to express affirmation. Its use is similar to that of the checkmark ("✓") in the Western world. Its opposite is the X mark ("✗" or "×").

The symbol's names and meanings vary across cultures. In Japanese it is called marujirushi (丸印) or maru (丸) and expresses affirmation. In Korean it is called gongpyo (공표; 空標; lit. 'zero mark') and expresses affirmation.

== Usage in Japan ==
Japan interprets the symbol as an affirmation.

Japan employs a number of related symbols (◎ ○ △ ×) in a system that expresses degrees of affirmation. A bullseye "◎" (nijūmaru; 二重丸) is often used for "excellent", the circle is a plain affirmation, the triangle "△" (sankaku; 三角) means "so-so" or "partially applicable", and the "×" expresses disagreement. This system is widely known in Japan, and thus often used without explanation. Ad-hoc adjustments are usually explained.

The hanamaru (花丸, 'flower O mark') is a variant of the O mark. It is typically drawn as a spiral surrounded by rounded flower petals, suggesting a flower. It is frequently used in praising or complimenting children, and the motif often appears in children's characters and logos. The hanamaru is frequently written on tests if a student has achieved full marks or an otherwise outstanding result. It is sometimes used in place of an O mark in grading written response problems if a student's answer is especially good. Some teachers add rotations to the spiral for exceptional answers.

Two circles ◯◯ (marumaru) are often used as a placeholder - either because a variety of words, names or numbers could be used in that position, or because of censorship.

== Unicode ==
Unicode provides various related symbols, including:

Symbol	Unicode code point (hex)	Name
○	U+25CB	WHITE CIRCLE
◎	U+25CE	BULLSEYE
●	U+25CF	BLACK CIRCLE
◯	U+25EF	LARGE CIRCLE
⭕︎	U+2B55	HEAVY LARGE CIRCLE
⭕️	U+2B55	HEAVY LARGE CIRCLE
🙆️	U+1F646	FACE WITH OK GESTURE

U+2B55 ⭕ HEAVY LARGE CIRCLE has both text and emoji presentations, as shown in the table. It defaults to emoji presentation.

The emoji U+1F4AE 💮 WHITE FLOWER looks similar to hanamaru, although it represents a rubber stamp commonly used to grade students' written answers and is not usually recognized as hanamaru.

== See also ==
- ○× quiz – true/false quizzes in Japan that use the O mark and X mark
- Check mark
- Circle
- Geometric Shapes (Unicode block) – Block of Unicode symbols
- PlayStation controller – Game controller for the PlayStation
- Tic-tac-toe
- List of Japanese typographic symbols
