= Chief Crazy Horse (film) =

1955 film by George Sherman

- Theatrical release poster
- Directed by: George Sherman
- Screenplay by: Franklin Coen; Gerald Drayson Adams
- Story by: Gerald Drayson Adams
- Produced by: William Alland
- Starring: Victor Mature; Suzan Ball; John Lund
- Cinematography: Harold Lipstein
- Edited by: Al Clark
- Music by: Frank Skinner
- Color process: Technicolor
- Production company: Universal International Pictures
- Distributed by: Universal Pictures
- Release date: April 1955
- Running time: 86 minutes
- Country: United States
- Language: English
- Box office: $1.75 million (US/Canada rentals)

Chief Crazy Horse is a 1955 American CinemaScope Western film directed by George Sherman and starring Victor Mature, Suzan Ball, and John Lund. The film is a largely fictionalized biography of the Lakota Sioux Chief Crazy Horse. It was also known as Valley of Fury.

== Plot ==
Some of the scenes in the film include a voiceover narrative told by a white trader who knew the Lakota Sioux Chief Crazy Horse.

When young Crazy Horse (Victor Mature) wins his bride, rival Little Big Man (Ray Danton) goes to villainous traders with evidence of gold in the sacred Lakota burial ground. A new gold rush starts, and old treaties are torn up. Crazy Horse becomes chief of his people, leading them to war at the Battle of the Little Bighorn.

== Cast ==
- Victor Mature as Crazy Horse
- Suzan Ball as Black Shawl
- John Lund as Major Twist
- Ray Danton as Little Big Man
- Keith Larsen as Flying Hawk
- Paul Guilfoyle as Worm
- David Janssen as Lt. Colin Cartwright
- Robert Warwick as Spotted Tail
- James Millican as General Crook
- Morris Ankrum as Red Cloud
- Donald Randolph as Aaron Cartwright
- Robert F. Simon as Jeff Mantz
- James Westerfield as Caleb Mantz
- Stuart Randall as Old Man Afraid
- Pat Hogan as Dull Knife
- Dennis Weaver as Maj. Carlisle
- John Peters as Sgt. Guthrie
- Henry Wills as He Dog

== Production ==
Jeff Chandler was originally announced to play the lead. Instead, the part was given to Victor Mature. Filming began in June 1954 on location in Montana and Wyoming. This was the final film of Suzan Ball, who died of cancer four months after the film was released.

== Reception ==
Bosley Crowther wrote that the film was "just a series of hit-and-holler clashes between the Indians and the United States Cavalry" and "[s]o monotonous, indeed, are these forays that when they finally get around to the famous slaughter of Custer's troop at the Little Big Horn, it is just another routine episode--even though it is later mentioned as the great victory that the old chief prophesied".

== See also ==
- List of American films of 1955
