= Yankee Buccaneer =

1952 American film by Frederick de Cordova

- Directed by: Frederick de Cordova
- Screenplay by: Charles K. Peck Jr.
- Story by: Charles K. Peck Jr
- Produced by: Howard Christie
- Starring: Jeff Chandler; Scott Brady; Suzan Ball
- Cinematography: Russell Metty
- Edited by: Frank Gross
- Music by: Joseph Gershenson
- Production company: Universal Pictures
- Distributed by: Universal International
- Release date: September 16, 1952 (Los Angeles)
- Running time: 86 minutes
- Country: United States
- Language: English

Yankee Buccaneer is a 1952 American technicolor adventure film directed by Frederick de Cordova and starring Jeff Chandler as a US Navy officer fighting pirates, and Scott Brady and Suzan Ball. Distributed by Universal-International and produced by Howard Christie, it was shot in Technicolor and was released on September 16. The story is set in the early 19th century and tells of Commander David Porter and his men going undercover as pirates to fight piracy.

== Plot ==
In 1823, brash naval officer David Farragut (Scott Brady) boards the Essex and informs its commander, David Porter (Jeff Chandler), that the Navy is commandeering the ship for a top-secret mission. Although the crew is overdue for shore leave, Porter, a cold, efficient leader, lies to them in order to coerce them to volunteer for the dangerous assignment. Farragut soon reunites with his old shipmate, Chief Petty Officer Link (George Mathews), who tries to convince him that Porter, who years earlier trained Farragut harshly in an attempt to teach him patience and discipline, is not as heartless as he appears. This starts to show itself when Porter later reconciles with Farragut about their past and agree to be civil with one another.

Once the ship is at sea, Porter and Farragut open their orders and are dismayed to discover their mission: to disguise themselves as pirates, with no ties to or protection from the United States, in order to track down pirates raiding the West Indies. One night soon after, Farragut is in charge of the ship when a storm hits. Link becomes trapped beneath a keg of rum from which he has tried to sneak a drink and Farragut is forced to break the ship's rudder to rescue him. Porter discovers the damage, but even when he threatens to court-martial Farragut, the officer refuses to inform on Link.

Within days, the supplies begin to run out, one of the crew contracts scurvy, and Porter steers the rudderless Essex to the West Indies for repairs and supplies. Farragut grows frustrated with the slow drift and, although Porter forbids anyone to enter the shark-infested waters, he tries to repair the rudder himself. When a shark attacks and Farragut's rope catches on a barnacle, he is barely rescued in time, and Porter chastises him again. Six days later, the men finally reach land and Porter orders Farragut and Link to gather supplies.

Link is drunk and reported missing from his duty, and when Farragut searches the island's jungle for him, he is captured by natives. They bring Farragut to Portuguese countess Margarita La Raguna (Suzan Ball), who is in hiding. She insists at gunpoint that he take her back to the ship, but once there, she hides the pistol, causing Porter to scoff at Farragut's claim that he was forced to bring her. Margarita reveals that she and her countrymen now live in Rio de Janeiro and wish to use their gold to establish a trade route between Brazil and England. However, the newly reinstated Portuguese king has demanded that his subjects and their riches return to Portugal and abducted her ship while it was en route to England. Her father was killed and the sailing instructions for the Brazilian fleet were stolen, and she needs passage to Brazil to warn the fleet. Porter, as captivated by Margarita's beauty as is Farragut, agrees to take her on board, and as the days pass, the two men vie for her attention.

One day, a Portuguese ship appears. Porter waits until the last possible moment to fly the pirate flag but is shocked when the Portuguese captain, Poulini, responds in a friendly manner. However, Margarita is furious to learn they are pirates because the Caribbean pirates, led by Scarjack, are working together with the Portuguese and the corrupt island governor, Count Domingo Del Prado, to steal her people's gold. Porter decides to return Margarita to the islands for her protection, and when she begs Farragut to try to change the captain's mind, Farragut agrees and gives her his medallion as a good luck piece.

As they near the island, Margarita overhears Porter and Farragut discussing their camouflage strategy and, assuming they are in league with Del Prado, jumps off the ship and swims ashore. She is immediately captured, as is Farragut when he takes a crew to the island for more supplies. Brought before Del Prado, Margarita denounces Farragut as a pirate and throws down his medallion. Immediately recognizing it as American, Del Prado imprisons them all and tortures Farragut to reveal the ship's plans.

Back on the ship, Link urges Porter to rescue Farragut, and although he risks being court-martialed for defying his orders, Porter finally agrees. The whole crew infiltrates the island and, disguised as Del Prado's soldiers, attack the dungeon. After freeing Farragut and Margarita, Porter overpowers Del Prado in a sword fight and brings him back to the ship. They make him walk the plank until he returns the Brazilian sailing instructions to Margarita. Porter then sets course for America and agrees with Link that Farragut, who is wrapped in an embrace with Margarita, has finally become a man.

== Cast ==
- Jeff Chandler as Commander David Porter
- Scott Brady as Lieutenant David Farragut
- Suzan Ball as Countess Margarita La Raguna
- Joseph Calleia as Count Domingo Del Prado
- George Mathews as Link
- Rodolfo Acosta as Poulini
- David Janssen as Beckett
- Joseph Vitale as Scarjack
- Michael Ansara as Lieutenant Romero
- James Parnell as Redell
- Jay Silverheels as Lead warrior

== Production ==
Filming took first place in February 1952.

Left over sets from this film were used for Against All Flags, which was released later in the year in December 1952.

== Home media ==
Universal first released the film on DVD on May 8, 2007, as part of the Pirates of the Golden Age Movie Collection, a 2-disc set featuring three other films (Against All Flags, Buccaneer's Girl, and Double Crossbones). This film was re-released on August 28, 2014, as a stand-alone DVD as part of the Universal Studios.
