= City Beneath the Sea (1953 film) =

1953 film by Budd Boetticher

- Directed by: Budd Boetticher
- Written by: Jack Harvey; Ramon Romero
- Based on: Port Royal: The Ghost; City Beneath the Sea by Harry E. Rieseberg
- Produced by: Albert J. Cohen
- Starring: Robert Ryan; Mala Powers; Anthony Quinn; Suzan Ball
- Cinematography: Charles P. Boyle
- Edited by: Edward Curtiss
- Production company: Universal Pictures
- Distributed by: Universal Pictures
- Release date: April 21, 1953
- Running time: 87 minutes
- Country: United States
- Language: English
- Box office: $1.25 million (US)

City Beneath the Sea is a 1953 American technicolor adventure film directed by Budd Boetticher and starring Robert Ryan, Mala Powers, Anthony Quinn and Suzan Ball. The film is based on the book Port Royal: The Ghost City Beneath the Sea by Harry E. Rieseberg.

== Plot ==
In Jamaica, salvage divers Brad and Tony are hired by Dwight Trevor to find The Lady Luck, a ship that supposedly sank with all hands and $1,000,000 in gold bullion. There is no trace of the sunken ship, but there is a sunken city, the city of Port Royal that was destroyed in an earthquake in 1692. The gold bullion was actually lost in a modern-day quake and is part of an insurance fraud perpetrated by Trevor. He does not want the divers to find the gold and will stop at nothing to ensure the success of his plan.

== Cast ==
- Robert Ryan as Brad Carlton
- Mala Powers as Terry McBride
- Anthony Quinn as Tony Nartlett
- Suzan Ball as Venita aka Mary Lou Beetle
- George Mathews as Capt. Meade aka Ralph Sorensen
- Karel Štěpánek as Dwight Trevor
- Hilo Hattie as Mama Mary
- Lalo Ríos as Calypso
- Woody Strode as Djion
- John Warburton as Captain Clive
- Peter Mamakos as Captain Pedro Mendoza
- Barbara Morrison as Madame Cecile
- LeRoi Antoine as Calypso singer
- Leon Lontoc as Kip
- Marya Marco as Half caste woman

== See also ==
- List of American films of 1953
