= It Takes Two (American TV series) =

1982 American TV series

- Created by: Susan Harris
- Starring: Richard Crenna; Patty Duke Astin; Helen Hunt; Anthony Edwards; Billie Bird; Richard McKenzie; Randy Dreyfuss; Della Reese
- Theme music composer: George Aliceson Tipton
- Composer: George Aliceson Tipton
- Country of origin: United States
- No. of seasons: 1
- No. of episodes: 22

Production
- Executive producers: Paul Junger Witt; Tony Thomas; Susan Harris
- Running time: 24–25 minutes
- Production company: Witt-Thomas-Harris Productions

Original release
- Network: ABC
- Release: October 14, 1982 – April 28, 1983

Related
- Soap Benson

It Takes Two is an American sitcom which ran on ABC from October 14, 1982, until April 28, 1983. It was created by Susan Harris, who had previously created the sitcom Soap and its spin-off Benson, both for ABC, the latter of which was in the midst of its run when this series premiered. The series starred Richard Crenna and Patty Duke Astin as a modern, dual-career couple whose personal lives were largely affected by their professions. Harris, her husband Paul Junger Witt and Tony Thomas executive-produced the series, under the group's Witt/Thomas/Harris Productions company.

== Synopsis ==
Dr. Sam Quinn (Crenna) was a surgeon in Chicago, who for many years had the comfort of coming home to his devoted wife Molly (Astin) after long hours at the hospital. However, Sam had a rude awakening when Molly, bored with being a housewife and yearning to make even more out of her life, enrolled in law school. As the series began, Molly was an assistant D.A., and before either of them knew it, the passion in their marriage, and quality time for each other, had quickly started to slip from their grasp. Sam missed being able to come home to warm dinners and clean laundry, and sex opportunities were few and far between—not to mention fruitless (Molly's long hours caused her to fall asleep right away when the two retired for the night). Fortunately, Sam and Molly were master communicators, and the two tried their best to compromise, in order to bring that spark back into their marriage. When they came to each other for support over highly emotional career-related matters, it was clear that there was still plenty of love to be shared.

The one aspect of their marriage that did change upon Molly's entrance into the legal system was political points of view. Molly had always seemed to agree with Sam's liberal leanings, which he continued to maintain. Eventually, Molly's time in the D.A.'s office had made her more hard-line and conservative, which became the cause of many debates in their household. In the end, it was Sam's knack for witty, no-holds-barred but warm reasoning that kept sensitive Molly from wanting to chuck her career when her cases became too much to bear.

Sam and Molly had two teenaged children, beautiful, carefree and sometimes smart-alecky daughter Lisa (Helen Hunt), who was in high school, and the hip Andy (Anthony Edwards), an aspiring rock musician who, at 18, was moving into his own apartment. However, like many young adults in TV series who were attempting to break away from their parents, Andy would still find a reason to visit so that Sam and Molly would help with his responsibilities.

Completing the household in the Quinn's luxurious high-rise apartment was Molly's salty mother (Billie Bird), only known as "Mama", whose blunt and often spontaneous comments added to the comic relief. Also featured were Sam's jovial colleague at the hospital, Dr. Walter Chaiken (Richard McKenzie), and Judge Caroline Phillips (Della Reese), who presided over many of the cases that Molly was hired for.

The original proposed title for the series was For Better or Worse.

== Episodes ==
No.	Title	Directed by	Written by	Original release date
1	"Sam and Molly"	Unknown	Unknown	October 14, 1982
2	"Turnabout"	Unknown	Unknown	October 21, 1982
3	"Death Penalty"	Unknown	Unknown	October 28, 1982
4	"Promises in the Dark"	Unknown	Unknown	November 4, 1982
5	"Heartbreak"	Unknown	Unknown	November 11, 1982
6	"Hello, I Must Be Going"	Unknown	Unknown	November 18, 1982
7	"Andy and the Older Woman"	Unknown	Unknown	November 25, 1982
8	"A Healthy Romance"	Jay Sandrich	Stephen Neigher	December 8, 1982
9	"An Affair to Remember"	Unknown	Unknown	December 16, 1982
10	"Mister Molly Quinn"	Unknown	Unknown	January 6, 1983
11	"Anniversary"	Unknown	Unknown	January 13, 1983
12	"The Choice"	Unknown	Unknown	January 20, 1983
13	"Looks Bad, Feels Good"	Unknown	Unknown	January 27, 1983
14	"Lying Down on the Job"	Unknown	Unknown	February 3, 1983
15	"Rhythm Blues"	Unknown	Unknown	February 17, 1983
16	"Swan Song"	Unknown	Unknown	February 24, 1983
17	"Inside Lisa Quinn"	Unknown	Unknown	March 3, 1983
18	"Only When You Laugh"	Unknown	Unknown	March 10, 1983
19	"Molly's Best Friend"	Unknown	Unknown	March 24, 1983
20	"Mother and Child Reunion"	Unknown	Unknown	March 31, 1983
21	"The Suit"	Unknown	Unknown	April 14, 1983
22	"Instinct"	Unknown	Unknown	April 28, 1983

== U.S. television ratings ==
Season	Episodes	Start date	End date	Nielsen rank	Nielsen rating
1982-83	22	October 24, 1982	April 28, 1983	46	N/A

== Guest stars ==
An early episode was notable for featuring a guest appearance by Kim Stanley, upon the veteran actress's return to on-screen work at the time. Stanley appeared in the episode "Death Penalty" (October 28, 1982) as the distraught mother of Molly's opposing litigant, a 26-year-old man who was being convicted of murdering six women. Molly, who was representing the victims' families, was adamant from the start over wanting the man to receive the death penalty. Her feelings on the matter in itself caused a rift at home between her and Sam, who, as a surgeon, took the stance of being sensitive to preserving life. Soon after, Molly was visited by the criminal's mother, who pleaded with Molly not to push for the death penalty, since she was convinced that her son's actions were due to mental illness. Stanley and Astin playing opposite each other in this episode brought their careers full circle, since both had made their cinematic debut in the 1958 Columbia Pictures film The Goddess. The same episode also featured a guest appearance by Scatman Crothers as a humorous 72-year-old patient of Sam's who faces an eighth consecutive surgery.

== Theme song ==
The series' theme song was "Where Love Spends the Night", arranged and composed by George Aliceson Tipton (the regular theme and score composer for Witt/Thomas/Harris shows) and performed in a duet by Paul Williams and Crystal Gayle. The title track was a soft, lullaby-type tune accentuated with acoustic guitar and backed by a softer version of the orchestral sound Tipton composed for other Witt/Thomas/Harris series.

Two different cuts of the opening vocal theme were used during It Takes Two's single-season run; the second version had certain lines that were sung by Crystal Gayle instead of Paul Williams.

== After cancellation ==
After the series was cancelled, Golden West Television, the company that provided production facilities for the shows produced by Witt/Thomas (and Harris), distributed syndicated reruns of It Takes Two (along with its sister series, It's a Living) to local stations during the 1983-84 season. This was the rare instance of a series that was only produced for one season being picked up for off-network, local station reruns.

Patty Duke Astin resumed work with Witt, Thomas and Harris on a new series, Hail to the Chief, which ultimately had a brief run on ABC in the spring of 1985. Astin's lead role on Hail to the Chief was the first occurrence of there being a female American president depicted on television. The series was just as topical as It Takes Two, but tended to be more off-the-wall in its tone, lending comparisons more so to that of Soap and to a degree, Benson.

Billie Bird subsequently joined the cast of sister series Benson, playing Mrs. Rose Cassidy in the show's final two seasons (1984–1986).

The Quinn family's kitchen set on It Takes Two was preserved by the producers after the series' cancellation, and was brought back unchanged in 1985 as the kitchen set for their then-new NBC sitcom The Golden Girls. This kitchen would remain on The Golden Girls for its entire seven-year run, with only a minor cosmetic change occurring toward the end of its first season: the wallpaper was changed from the yellow-with-white polka dot pattern held over from It Takes Two, in favor of a more Floridian palm leaf print on beige backing; shelves were built into the wall adjacent to the living room doorway, and decorative plates and baking molds were displayed to give a feminine touch. The exterior backdrop seen through the kitchen window was also changed from the view of neighboring Chicago high-rise buildings in It Takes Two to that of palm trees and bushes for the Miami suburb residence of The Golden Girls.
