= Nowhere to Run (1978 film) =

- Genre: Drama
- Based on: The Blackjack Hijack by Charles Einstein
- Written by: Jim Byrnes
- Directed by: Richard Lang
- Starring: David Janssen
- Music by: Jerrold Immel
- Country of origin: United States
- Original language: English

Production
- Producer: Jim Byrnes
- Production locations: Las Vegas; Reno, Nevada; San Francisco
- Cinematography: Chuck Arnold
- Editor: Gary Griffin
- Running time: 100 minutes
- Production company: MTM Enterprises

Original release
- Network: NBC
- Release: January 16, 1978

Nowhere to Run is a 1978 American drama television film directed by Richard Lang, based on the 1976 novel The Blackjack Hijack by Charles Einstein.

== Plot ==
Unlucky private eye Herbie Stolz (Allen Garfield) narrates the story about an exceptional person he once met, engineer Harry Adams (David Janssen).

Trapped in a marriage which has long since turned loveless (especially as his wife Marion (Stefanie Powers) is having an affair with insurance executive Joe Anasto (Anthony Eisley)) and with the background of President Kennedy's assassination, Harry has decided to totally replace his unhappy life with a more successful one, using a system he has devised for winning money at blackjack. He grows a beard, creates an identity which he can adopt without harming anyone, and slowly builds up his escape plan under the false identity of "Harold Reiss", which will include staging a fake suicide, ridding him of his real identity and leaving no one in pursuit of him, with all his potential adversaries (including his wife) receiving ample compensation and no hard feelings against him.

Harry discovers Herbie has been hired by Marion to spy on him, but instead turns the tables by convincing Herbie to help him by stalling Marion's suspicions. Herbie, confronted by his own unlucky life, bad divorce and bad job, which he seems to be stuck in, agrees to help Harry by feeding Marion false information

With everything in place, Harry shaves off his beard, changing his appearance, and goes through with his pretended "suicide", which convinces everyone ( even though a body is never recovered) and effectively disappears, becoming "Harold Reiss".

While executing his blackjack plan in Las Vegas, Harry meets and falls in love with Amy Kessler (Linda Evans), a recent divorcee. Herbie, who is also in Las Vegas and like everyone else had believed Harry to be dead, spots Harry playing blackjack in a casino and recognizes Harry's system and by extension Harry. Herbie convinces Harry to teach him the system, but somehow he never wins, and he is stuck with his continued "bad luck".

As the story nears its conclusion and as he is completing his plan, Harry decides to change his flight destination to Israel to coincide with Amy's. The money from the blackjack winnings ($500,000) is in his suitcase, taken aboard the plane as personal luggage. A woman with an identical suitcase also boards the plane.

At a stop in Greece, terrorists who have robbed a bank board the plane. A ransom is demanded and paid, and after the plane lands, all of the passengers, including Harry and Amy, are checked while the authorities try to find the missing ransom money. Realizing what will happen if his winnings are found in his suitcase, Harry exchanges his suitcase with the lady's, and she is arrested but then released. The terrorists then open their suitcase and discover the lady's underwear inside.

At the hotel room in Israel, after seeing a news broadcast about the missing ransom money ($1,000,000), Harry and Amy open the suitcase and discover that they now have even more money than he had originally accumulated from his blackjack winnings.

== Cast ==
- Lucky man - Harry Adams: David Janssen
- Wife - Marian Adams: Stefanie Powers
- Private eye - Herbie Stoltz: Allen Garfield
- Second love - Amy Kessler: Linda Evans
- Wife's friend - Charleen: Ahna Capri
- Wife's mother: Neva Patterson
- Wife's father: John Randolph
- Joe Anasto: Anthony Eisley
- McEnerney: James Keach
- Kaufman: Lance LeGault
- Christos: Lionel Decker
- Spense: Charles Siebert
- Dr. Steinberg: Richard McKenzie
- Mohr: Kenneth Tobey
- O'Neil: John Finnegan
- Neft: Antony Alda
- Mrs. Schneider: Ivy Bethune
- Maid (tells Harry about Kennedy): Marilyn Coleman
- Oliver: Paul Tulley
- Room service waiter: Kopi Sotiropulos
