= X mark =

Symbol with multiple meanings

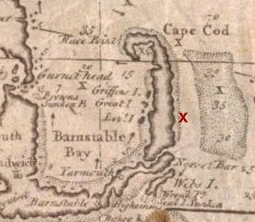
An X mark marking the spot of the wrecked Whydah Gally on Cape Cod

An X mark (also known as an ex mark or a cross mark or simply an X or ex or a cross) is either used to indicate the concept of negation (for example "no, this has not been verified", "no, that is not the correct answer" or "no, I do not agree"), or indicate affirmation (for example, in election ballot papers, legal documents, or maps as an x-marks-the-spot). When used to mean "no," its opposite is often considered to be the O mark used in Japan and Korea or the check mark (✓) used in the West. When used to mean "yes," it is often completely interchangeable with a check mark. In Japanese, the X mark (❌) is called "batsu" (ばつ) and can be expressed by someone by crossing their arms.

It is also used as a replacement for a signature for a person who is blind or illiterate and thus cannot write their name. Typically, the writing of an X used for this purpose must be witnessed to be valid.

As a verb, to X (or ex) off/out or to cross off/out means to add such a mark. It is quite common, especially on printed forms and document, for there to be squares in which to place x marks, or interchangeably checks.

It is traditionally used on maps to indicate locations, most famously on treasure maps. It is also used as a set of three to mark jugs of moonshine for having completed all distillation steps, while additionally signifying its potency (as high as 150 proof) relative to legal spirits, which rarely exceed 80 proof (40% ABV).

Among Native Americans in the 18th and 19th centuries, the X mark was used as a signature to denote presence or approval, particularly regarding agreements and treaties.

In the 21st century, the X mark started to be used to indicate collaborations between fashion brands.

== Unicode ==
Unicode provides various related symbols, including:

| Symbol | Unicode Code point (hex) | Name |
|---|---|---|
| ☐ | U+2610 | BALLOT BOX (checkbox) |
| ☒ | U+2612 | BALLOT BOX WITH X (square with cross) |
| ✗ | U+2717 | BALLOT X (cross) |
| ✘ | U+2718 | HEAVY BALLOT X (bold cross) |

The mark is generally rendered with a less symmetrical form than the following cross-shaped symbols:

| Symbol | Unicode Code point (hex) | Name |
|---|---|---|
| X | U+0058 | LATIN CAPITAL LETTER X |
| x | U+0078 | LATIN SMALL LETTER X |
| × | U+00D7 | MULTIPLICATION SIGN, Hybrid (biology) (esp. botany) |
| Χ | U+03A7 | GREEK CAPITAL LETTER CHI |
| χ | U+03C7 | GREEK SMALL LETTER CHI |
| Х | U+0425 | CYRILLIC CAPITAL LETTER HA |
| х | U+0445 | CYRILLIC SMALL LETTER HA |
| ⌧ | U+2327 | X IN A RECTANGLE BOX |
| ╳ | U+2573 | BOX DRAWINGS LIGHT DIAGONAL CROSS |
| ☓ | U+2613 | SALTIRE (St Andrew's Cross) |
| ✕ | U+2715 | MULTIPLICATION X |
| ✖ | U+2716 | HEAVY MULTIPLICATION X |
| ❌ | U+274C | CROSS MARK |
| ❎ | U+274E | NEGATIVE SQUARED CROSS MARK |
| ⨉ | U+2A09 | N-ARY TIMES OPERATOR |
| ⨯ | U+2A2F | VECTOR OR CROSS PRODUCT |
| 𝑥 | U+1D465 | MATHEMATICAL ITALIC SMALL X |
| 𝓍 | U+1D4CD | MATHEMATICAL SCRIPT SMALL X |
| 🗙 | U+1F5D9 | CANCELLATION X |
| 🗴 | U+1F5F4 | BALLOT SCRIPT X |
| 🞨 | U+1F7A8 | THIN SALTIRE |
| 🞩 | U+1F7A9 | LIGHT SALTIRE |
| 🞪 | U+1F7AA | MEDIUM SALTIRE |
| 🞫 | U+1F7AB | BOLD SALTIRE |
| 🞬 | U+1F7AC | HEAVY SALTIRE |
| 🞭 | U+1F7AD | VERY HEAVY SALTIRE |
| 🞮 | U+1F7AE | EXTREMELY HEAVY SALTIRE |

The batsu gesture may be represented with this emoji:

| Symbol | Unicode Code point (hex) | Name |
|---|---|---|
| 🙅 | U+1F645 | FACE WITH NO GOOD GESTURE |

== See also ==
- Check mark
- Dagger (typography) † ‡
- List of international common standards
- No symbol ⃠
- Saltire
- Single-letter second-level domain
- Tally marks

Mathematics

- Multiplication sign
  - Cartesian product
  - Cross product

Subcultures

- Straight edge
