= Untamed Frontier =

1952 film by Hugo Fregonese

- Film poster
- Directed by: Hugo Fregonese
- Screenplay by: Gerald Drayson Adams; John Bagni; Gwen Bagni
- Story by: Houston Branch; Eugenia Night
- Produced by: Leonard Goldstein
- Starring: Joseph Cotten; Shelley Winters; Scott Brady
- Cinematography: Charles P. Boyle
- Edited by: Virgil W. Vogel
- Music by: Hans J. Salter
- Color process: Technicolor
- Production company: Universal-International Pictures
- Distributed by: Universal-International Pictures
- Release date: July 23, 1952
- Running time: 78 minutes
- Country: United States
- Language: English
- Box office: $1.5 million (US rentals)

Untamed Frontier is a 1952 American technicolor Western film directed by Hugo Fregonese and starring Joseph Cotten, Shelley Winters and Scott Brady. It was produced and distributed by Universal Pictures. The film, featuring the working title of The Untamed featured the feature film debuts of Suzan Ball and Fess Parker.

== Plot ==
To the irritation of the US Government, the Denbow family freeze out homesteaders by denying access across their land, using the government land for grazing their cattle herds.

Meanwhile, to evade a murder charge, Glenn Denbow marries the only witness, Jane, who's conveniently in love with him, but favors the settlers. When Glenn goes back to his blackmailing old flame Lottie, a warm regard develops between Jane and cousin Kirk Denbow. Things come to a head when an impending range war coincides with a rustling foray.

== Cast ==
- Joseph Cotten as Kirk Denbow
- Shelley Winters as Jane Stevens
- Scott Brady as Glenn Denbow
- Suzan Ball as Lottie
- Minor Watson as Matt Denbow
- Katherine Emery as Camilla Denbow
- José Torvay as Bandera (as Jose Torvay)
- Douglas Spencer as Clayton Vance
- John Alexander as Max Wickersham
- Lee Van Cleef as Dave Chittun
- Richard Garland as Charlie Fentress
- Robert Anderson as Ezra McCloud
- Fess Parker as Clem McCloud
- Ray Bennett as Sheriff Brogan
- David Janssen as Lottie's Dance Partner
- Lalo Ríos as Pepe (uncredited)
