= Edward Chan Sieg =

American director, writer, poet and photographer

- Born: November 8, 1928
- Died: March 7, 2007 (aged 78)

Edward Chan Sieg (November 8, 1928 – March 7, 2007) was an American director, writer, poet and photographer.

== Early life ==
Sieg was born in 1928 to Edward Augustus Sieg and Gladys Geraldine Chan Sieg. "Gerald" was a member of one of the oldest Chinese families in Savannah, Georgia.

At the age of 12, Sieg published an article on Mozart's "Requiem" in The Etude magazine.

He graduated from Savannah High School, then from Savannah's Armstrong Junior College and the University of Georgia in Athens, Georgia. He earned a Master of Fine Arts and a doctoral degree at the latter institution.

Sieg fought in the Korean War.

== Career ==
In 1952, a year after moving to Hollywood, Sieg played Benny in a boxing movie titled The Ring.

He returned to Athens, Georgia, in the 1960s after being appointed the resident director at the Town and Gown Theatre. While in Athens, he wrote the original play An Existentialist in the House of Death.

His photograph of Mark Spitz at the 1972 Summer Olympics, shortly after winning the gold medal, also won Sieg a gold medal at the International Photographic Competition.

In the 1970s, Sieg worked at the Oatland Island Wildlife Center.

In 1984, Sieg published The Squares: An Introduction to Savannah. He followed it up the next year with Eden on the Marsh: An Illustrated History of Savannah. The proceeds from The Squares go toward benefiting Chatham Academy, a Savannah school for children with learning disabilities.

== Personal life ==
Sieg married Elizabeth, with whom he had a son and a daughter. His father died in 1969, aged 61; his mother died in 2005, aged 95. They are both interred in Savannah's Bonaventure Cemetery.

== Death ==
Sieg died in 2007, aged 78. He was survived by his wife and children.
