= Lillian Molieri =

Nicaraguan actress and dancer

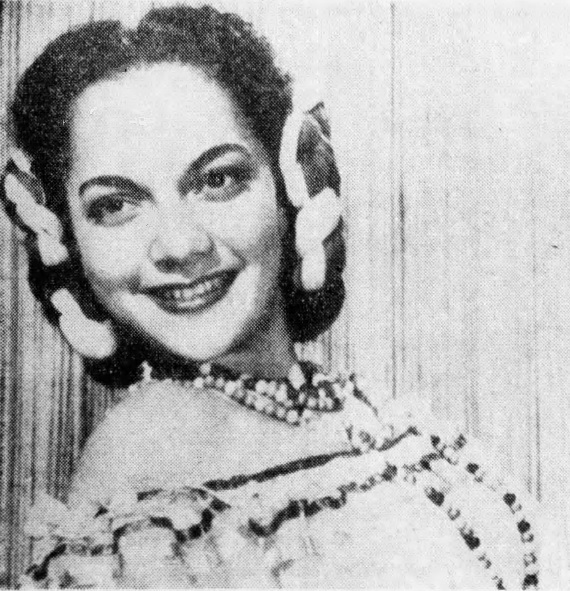
- Molieri in 1946
- Born: Lillian Molieri Bermúdez; 18 January 1925; Managua, Nicaragua
- Died: 13 September 1980 (aged 55); Managua, Nicaragua
- Occupation: Actress · Dancer
- Years active: 1944–1957

Lillian Molieri Bermúdez (18 January 1925 – 13 September 1980) was a Nicaraguan actress and dancer. She was noted for her minor roles in Hollywood films and TV series between 1944 and 1957, though most of them went uncredited. She later became a dancer and dance instructor and was honored with the Monje de Oro in 1966 for her radio show.

== Early life ==
Lillian Molieri Bermúdez was born in Managua to Mélida Bermúdez and L. Arturo Molieri. Her father was the president of the Nicaraguan National Bank. Her family was of Italian descent, but had lived in Nicaragua for three generations prior to Molieri's birth. The oldest daughter in the family, she attended school at the Convento Notre Dame de Cion • and then furthered her education at the Colegio de la Asuncion in Nicaragua. Completing her high school education, Molieri traveled in Europe learning French and Italian. After winning several beauty contests in Nicaragua in the early 1940s, she came to Los Angeles, where her brother Ronald was serving as Nicaragua’s Vice Consul, to improve her English and enrolled in university to study banking. She was discovered by Paramount while at university and offered her first movie role in 1944.

== Career ==
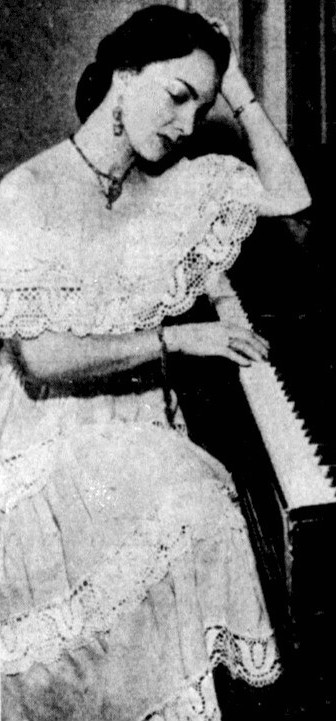
Molieri in 1953

Her first appearance was in The Princess and the Pirate (1944). In 1945, Molieri starred in Lambert Hillyer's western South of the Rio Grande for Monogram Pictures. She sang two songs in the film, appearing opposite Duncan Renaldo as the Cisco Kid. In John Cromwell's Anna and the King of Siam the following year she portrayed one of the wives of the King (Rex Harrison). She had a featured role in Paramount's People Are Funny. In May, 1949, Molieri was married to Adolph Hartman, Jr., a descendant of one of the founders of Anaheim, California.

Because of typecasting, Molieri was often limited to roles where she played stereotypical parts as an exotic, foreign woman. She was often assigned bit parts, like in Valentino, with Anthony Dexter. Dexter became her dancing partner and he and Molieri performed routines which toured from the Midwest to Miami. The duo mainly performed Spanish or South American dances, but also included tap and ballroom dancing in their repertoire. She also performed in several television roles, most noted was her appearance as "Carlota Romero", Ricky Ricardo's long-lost Cuban girlfriend in an episode of I Love Lucy.

In 1955, Molieri appeared in "The Great McGinty" episode of Lux Video Theatre, appearing opposite Nancy Gates and William Schallert. Her last film was The Three Runaways (1956) and then she left the United States to tour with her parents in Europe for the next three years, while her father served as a diplomat. In 1959, the family returned to Managua and Molieri instituted divorce proceedings to dissolve her marriage with the Catholic Church. She opened a dance studio and performed and taught in Nicaragua from the 1960s. She also hosted a weekly radio show, Aquí con Lillian Molieri (Here with Lillian Molieri), beginning in 1965. The show was an hour-long broadcast on National Radio, which was honored in 1966 with the Monje de Oro, "the Nicaraguan equivalent of an Oscar".

== Death and legacy ==
Molieri died at her home in Managua at age 55 in 1980. She is remembered as one of the first Nicaraguan actors to perform in Hollywood.

== Filmography ==
- The Princess and the Pirate (1944) as Goldwyn Girl (uncredited)
- South of the Rio Grande (1945) as Dolores Gonzalez
- Tarzan and the Leopard Woman (1946) as Zambesi Maiden (uncredited)
- People Are Funny (1946) as Singer – 'Hey Jose' (uncredited)
- Anna and the King of Siam (1946) as Wife of King (uncredited)
- The Stranger (1946) (uncredited)
- Forever Amber (1947) as Queen Catherine (uncredited)
- The Lost Moment (1947) as girl (uncredited)
- Hellfire (1949) as Mexican saloon girl (uncredited)
- Neptune's Daughter (1949) as cigarette girl (uncredited)
- Holiday in Havana (1949) as Felicia (uncredited)
- A Lady Without Passport (1950) as girl (uncredited)
- South of Caliente (1950) as gypsy dancer
- Anne of the Indies (1951) as slave girl (uncredited)
- My Favorite Spy (1951) as girl (uncredited)
- Dangerous Assignment: The Burma Temple Story (1952) (TV Series) as Linya
- My Man and I (1952) as Bride (uncredited)
- Hopalong Cassidy: The Knife of Carlos Valero (1952) (TV Series) as Trini
- The Ring (1952) as Helen Cantanios
- Horizons West (1952) as Teresa (uncredited)
- The Adventures of Kit Carson (1951–52) as Conchita/Rosita Salvadore/Maria
- Adventures of the Falcon: Tangiers Finale (1954) (TV Series) as Carmencita
- Big Town: The Consulate (1954) (TV Series) as Francesca
- Stories of the Century: Tiburcio Vasquez (1954) (TV Series) as Dolores Vasquez
- Green Fire (1954) as Mexican girl (uncredited)
- Strange Lady in Town (1955) as Sister Delphine (uncredited)
- Lux Video Theatre: The Great McGinty (1955) (TV Series) as girl at bar
- Hell's Island (1955) as girl at Juke Box
- The Cisco Kid: He Couldn't Quit (1956) (TV Series) as gypsy
- The Man Called X: Embassy (1956) (TV Series)
- Serenade (1956) as Tosca in 'Tosca' (uncredited)
- The Creature Walks Among Us (1956) as Mrs. Morteno
- The Three Outlaws (1956) as Rita Aguilar
- I Love Lucy (1953, 1956) (TV Series)
- Crossroads: Jhonakehunkga Called Jim (1957) (TV Series) as Katira
