= David Janssen =

American actor (1931–1980)

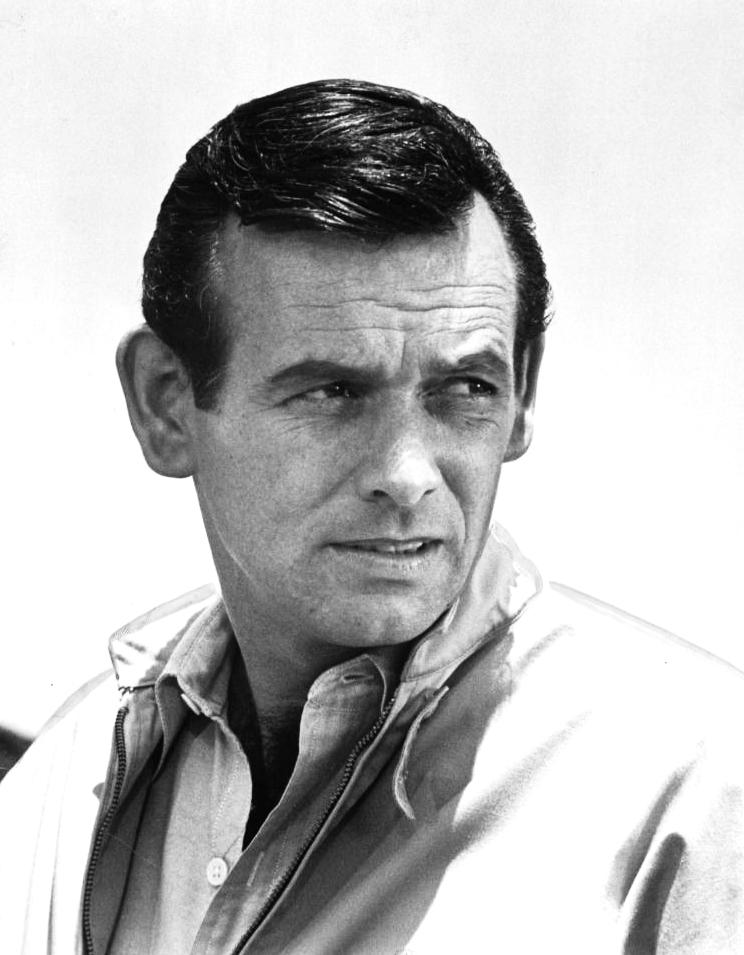
- Janssen in The Fugitive (1963)
- Born: David Harold Meyer; March 27, 1931; Naponee, Nebraska, U.S.
- Died: February 13, 1980 (aged 48); Malibu, California, U.S.
- Resting place: Hillside Memorial Park Cemetery
- Occupation: Actor
- Years active: 1945–1980
- Spouses: Ellie Graham (m. 1958; div. 1968) Dani Crayne (m. 1975)

David Janssen (born David Harold Meyer; March 27, 1931 – February 13, 1980) was an American film and television actor who is best known for his starring role as Richard Kimble in the television series The Fugitive (1963–1967). Janssen also had the title roles in three other television series: Richard Diamond, Private Detective; O'Hara, U.S. Treasury; and Harry O.

In 1996, TV Guide ranked him number 36 on its 50 Greatest TV Stars of All Time list.

== Early life ==
David Janssen was born on March 27, 1931, in Naponee, Nebraska, as David Harold Meyer. His father was Harold Edward Meyer, a banker, and his mother, Berniece Graf, was formerly Miss Nebraska and a Ziegfeld girl. Following his parents' divorce in 1935, his mother moved with David to Los Angeles and married Eugene Janssen in 1940. David identified with his Jewish stepfather and adopted his surname after entering show business as a child.

Janssen attended Fairfax High School, where he excelled on the basketball court, setting a school scoring record that lasted over 20 years. His first film part was at the age of thirteen, and by the age of twenty-five, he had appeared in twenty films and served two years as an enlisted man in the United States Army. During his Army days, Janssen became a friend of fellow enlistees Martin Milner and Clint Eastwood while posted at Fort Ord, California.

== Acting career ==
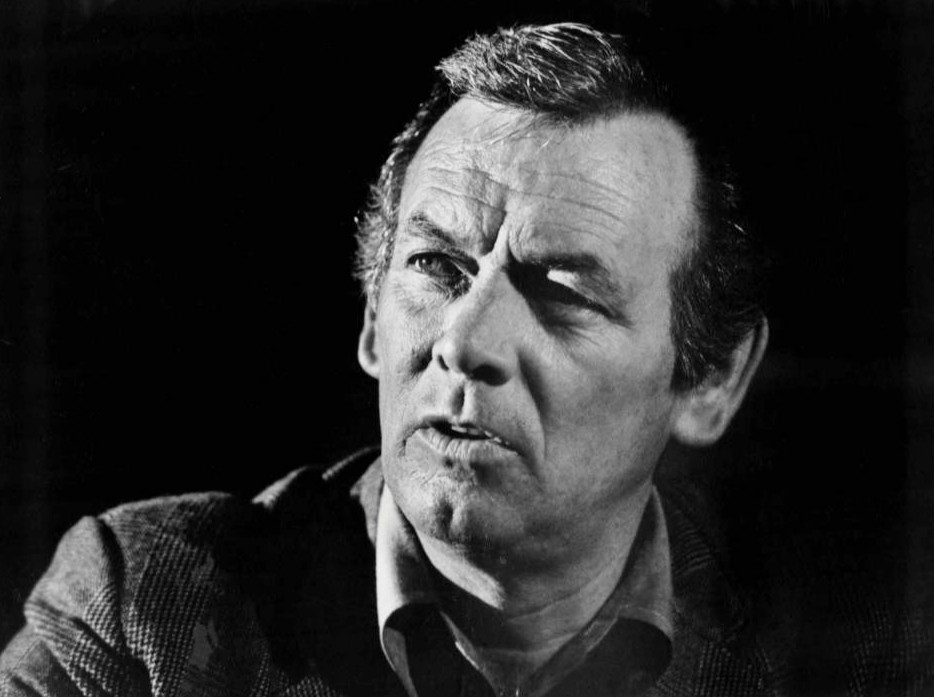
Janssen in Harry O (1975)

Janssen starred in four television series of his own:

- Richard Diamond, Private Detective (1957–1960)
- The Fugitive (1963–1967)
- O'Hara, U.S. Treasury (1971–1972)
- Harry O (1974–1976)

At the time of its airing in August 1967, the final episode of The Fugitive held the record for the greatest number of American homes to watch a series finale – 72 percent. In 1996 TV Guide ranked The Fugitive number 36 on its 50 Greatest Shows of All Time list.

His films include: To Hell and Back, the biography of Audie Murphy, who was the most decorated American soldier of World War II; Hell to Eternity, a 1960 American World War II biopic starring Jeffrey Hunter as a Hispanic boy who fought in the Battle of Saipan and who was raised by Japanese-American foster parents; John Wayne's Vietnam war film The Green Berets; opposite Gregory Peck, in the space story Marooned, in which Janssen played an astronaut sent to rescue three stranded men in space; and The Shoes of the Fisherman, as a television journalist in Rome reporting on the election of a new Pope (Anthony Quinn).

He also played pilot Harry Walker in the 1973 action movie Birds of Prey. He starred as a Los Angeles police detective trying to clear himself in the killing of an apparently innocent doctor in the 1967 film Warning Shot, which was shot during a break in the spring and summer of 1966 between the third and fourth seasons of The Fugitive.

Janssen played an alcoholic in the 1977 TV movie A Sensitive, Passionate Man, which co-starred Angie Dickinson, and played an engineer who devises an unbeatable system for blackjack in the 1978 made-for-TV movie Nowhere to Run, co-starring Stefanie Powers and Linda Evans. Janssen's impressively husky voice was used to good effect as the narrator for the TV mini-series Centennial (1978–79); he also appeared in the final episode. And in 1979 he starred in the made-for-TV mini series S.O.S. Titanic as John Jacob Astor, playing opposite Beverly Ross as his wife, Madeleine.

Though Janssen's scenes were cut from the final release, he also appeared as a journalist in the film Inchon, which he accepted to work with Laurence Olivier, who played General Douglas MacArthur. At the time of his death, Janssen had just begun filming a television movie playing the part of Father Damien, the priest who dedicated himself to the leper colony on the island of Molokai, Hawaii. The part was eventually reassigned to actor Ken Howard of the CBS series The White Shadow.

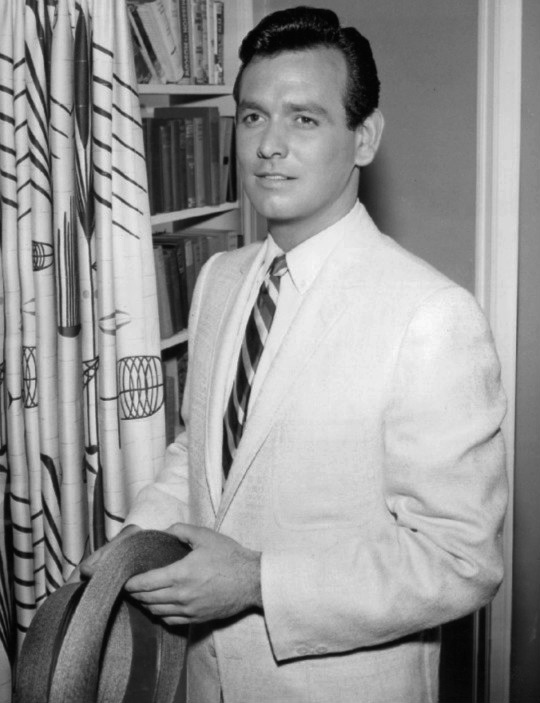
David Janssen in 1957

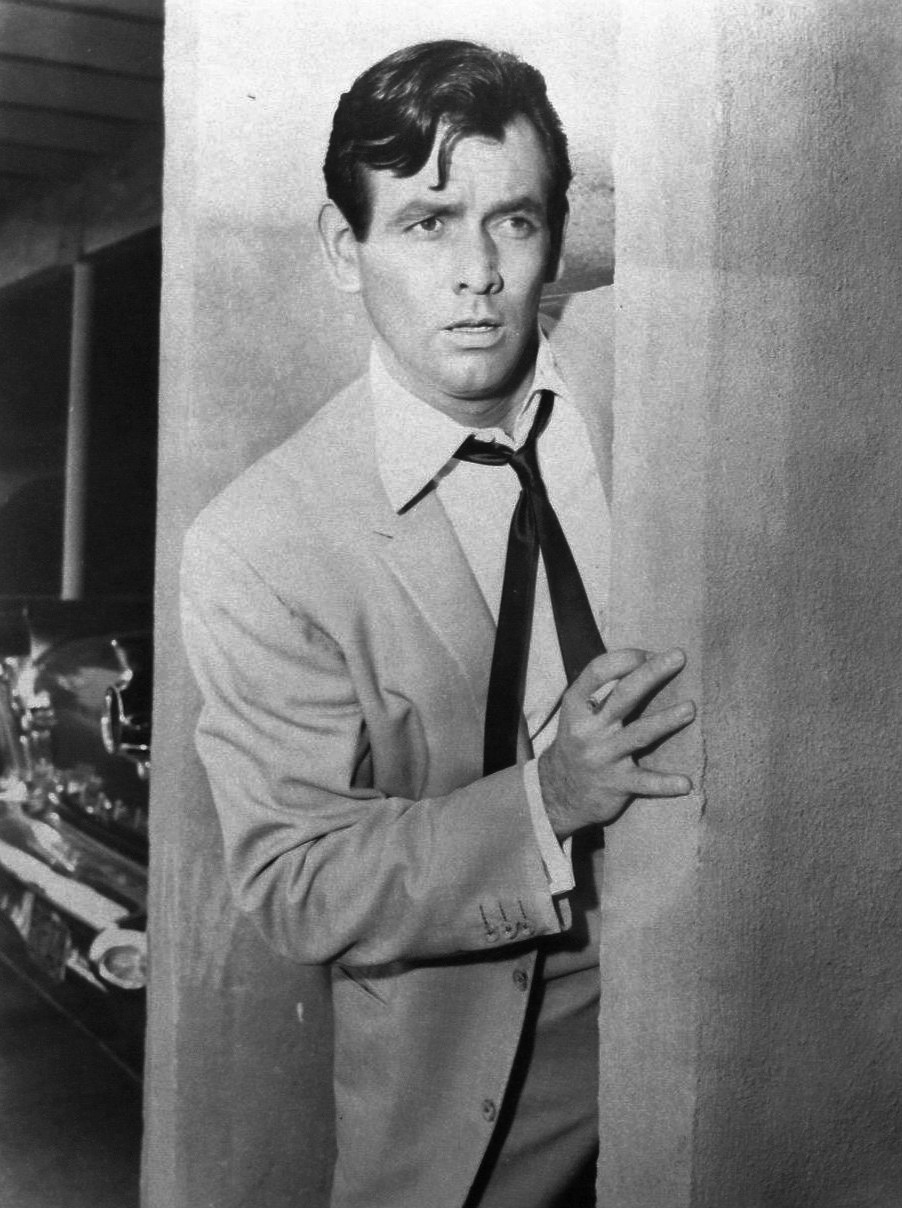
Janssen as Richard Diamond (1959)

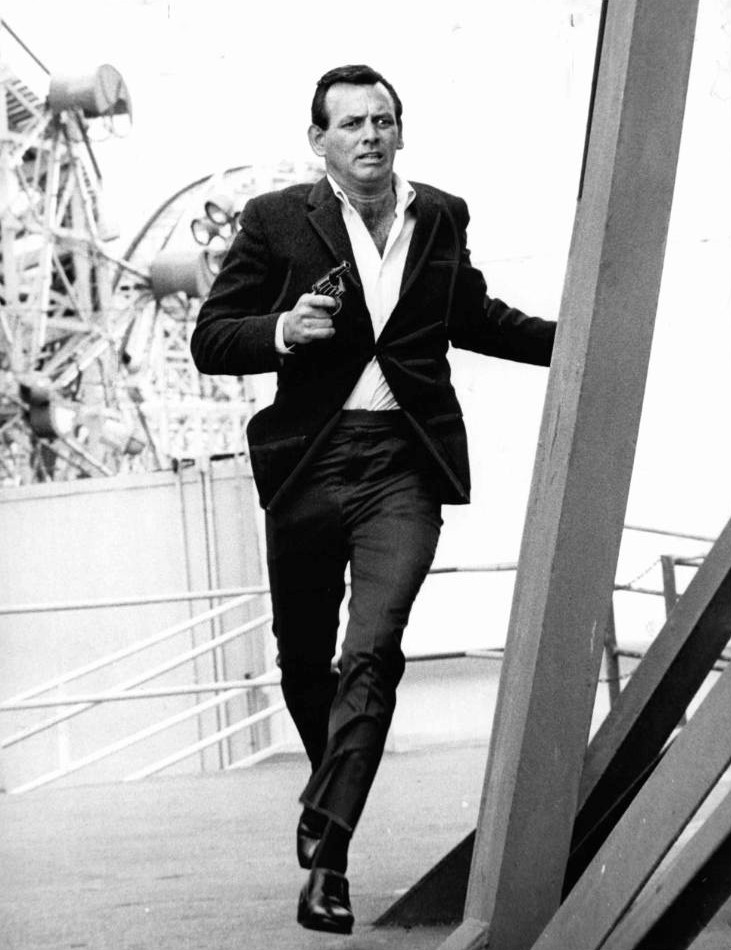
David Janssen as Dr. Richard Kimble in the TV series The Fugitive, 1967 (final episode)

== Personal life ==
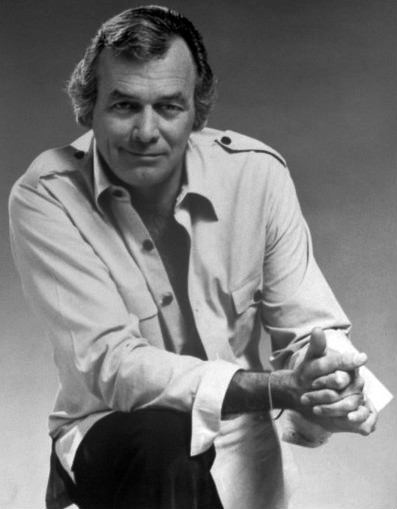
in 1974

Janssen was married twice, first to interior decorator Ellie Graham from 1958 until their divorce in 1968. In 1964, amid marital problems with Ellie, Janssen had a three-month affair with Suzanne Pleshette. In 1975, he married actress-turned-socialite Dani Crayne, and they remained married until Janssen's death in 1980.

== Death ==
A heavy drinker, as well as a chain smoker, Janssen smoked up to four packs of cigarettes a day. He died from a sudden heart attack in the early morning of February 13, 1980, at his beachfront home in Malibu, California, at the age of 48. At the time of his death, Janssen was filming the television movie Father Damien. Janssen was buried at the Hillside Memorial Park Cemetery in Culver City, California.

A non-denominational funeral was held at the Jewish chapel of the cemetery on February 17. Suzanne Pleshette delivered the eulogy at the request of Janssen's widow. Milton Berle, Johnny Carson, Richard Harris, Carl Weathers, Stan Herman, Rod Stewart, Gregory Peck and Tommy Gallagher were among Janssen's pallbearers. Honorary pallbearers included Jack Lemmon, George Peppard, James Stewart, and Danny Thomas.

For his contribution to the television industry, David Janssen has a star on the Hollywood Walk of Fame located on the 7700 block of Hollywood Boulevard.

== Selected filmography ==
- It's a Pleasure (1945) as Davey / Boy Referee (uncredited)
- Swamp Fire (1946) as Emile's Eldest Son (uncredited)
- No Room for the Groom (1952) as Soldier (scenes deleted)
- Francis Goes to West Point (1952) as Corporal Thomas
- Untamed Frontier (1952) as Lottie's Dance Partner (uncredited)
- Bonzo Goes to College (1952) as Jack (uncredited)
- Yankee Buccaneer (1952) as Beckett
- Back at the Front (1952) as Soldier (uncredited)
- Leave It to Harry (1954) as Quiz Show Host (short subject)
- Chief Crazy Horse (1955) as Lieutenant Colin Cartwright
- Cult of the Cobra (1955) as Rico Nardi
- Francis in the Navy (1955) as Lieutenant Anders
- The Private War of Major Benson (1955) as Young Lieutenant
- To Hell and Back (1955) as Lieutenant Lee
- All That Heaven Allows (1955) as Freddie Norton (uncredited)
- The Square Jungle (1955) as Jack Lindsay
- Never Say Goodbye (1956) as Dave Heller
- The Toy Tiger (1956) as Larry Tripps
- Francis in the Haunted House (1956) as Police Lieutenant Hopkins
- Away All Boats (1956) as Talker (uncredited)
- Mr. Black Magic (1956) as Master of Ceremonies (short subject)
- Showdown at Abilene (1956) as Verne Ward
- The Girl He Left Behind (1956) as Captain Genaro
- Lafayette Escadrille (1958) as Duke Sinclair
- Hell to Eternity (1960) as Sergeant Bill Hazen
- Dondi (1961) as Dealey
- King of the Roaring 20s – The Story of Arnold Rothstein (1961) as Arnold Rothstein
- Ring of Fire (1961) as Sergeant Steve Walsh
- Twenty Plus Two (1961) as Tom Alder
- Man-Trap (1961) as Vince Biskay
- My Six Loves (1963) as Marty Bliss
- Warning Shot (1967) as Sergeant Tom Valens
- The Green Berets (1968) as George Beckworth
- The Shoes of the Fisherman (1968) as George Faber
- Where It's At (1969) as A.C.
- Marooned (1969) as Ted Dougherty
- Generation (1969) as Jim Bolton
- Macho Callahan (1970) as Diego Callahan
- Once Is Not Enough (1975) as Tom Colt
- The Swiss Conspiracy (1976) as David Christopher
- Two-Minute Warning (1976) as Steve
- Warhead (1977) as Tony Stevens
- Golden Rendezvous (1977) as Charles Conway
- Covert Action (1978) as Lester Horton
- Inchon (1981) as David Feld (scenes deleted after premiere; final film role; filmed in 1979; released posthumously)

=== Television films ===
- Belle Sommers (1962) as Danny Castle
- Night Chase (1970) as Adrian Vico
- The Longest Night (1972) as Alan Chambers
- Moon of the Wolf (1972) as Sheriff Aaron Whitaker
- Hijack (1973) as Jake Wilkenson
- Birds of Prey (1973) as Harry Walker
- Harry O – Such Dust As Dreams Are Made On (1973) as Harry Orwell
- Pioneer Woman (1973) as Robert Douglas
- Harry O – Smile Jenny, You're Dead (1974) as Harry Orwell
- Don't Call the Police (1974) as Harry Orwell
- Fer-de-Lance (1974) as Russ Bogan
- Stalk the Wild Child (1976) as Dr. James Hazard
- Mayday at 40,000 Feet! (1976) as Captain Pete Douglass
- A Sensitive, Passionate Man (1977) as Michael Delaney
- Superdome (1978) as Mike Shelley
- Nowhere to Run (1978) as Harry Adams
- S.O.S. Titanic (1979) as John Jacob Astor
- The Golden Gate Murders (1979) as Detective Sergeant Paul Silver
- High Ice (1980) as Glencoe MacDonald
- City in Fear (1980) as Vince Perrino (released posthumously)
- Father Damien: The Leper Priest (1980) (Incomplete – Replaced by Ken Howard)

=== Television series ===
- Boston Blackie (1951) (Season 1 Episode 2: "Cop Killer") as Armored Car Driver (uncredited)
- Lux Video Theatre (1955–1956) (3 episodes)
  - (Season 5 Episode 30: "It Grows on Trees") (1955) as Ralph
  - (Season 5 Episode 51: "Perilous Deception") (1955) as Joe Davies
  - (Season 6 Episode 27: "It Started With Eve") (1956) as Johnny Reynolds Jr.
- Matinee Theatre (1956) (Episode 193: "Belong to Me") as Paul Merrick
- Conflict (1957) (Season 1 Episode 12: "The Money") as Sid Lukes
- You Are There (1957) (Season 5 Episode 8: "The End of the Dalton Gang (October 5, 1892)" as Grat Dalton
- U.S. Marshal (1 episode)
- Alcoa Theatre (1957–1958) (2 episodes)
  - (Season 1 Episode 6: "Cupid Wore a Badge") (1957) as Mike Harper
  - (Season 1 Episode 20: "Decoy Duck") (1958) as Jim McCandless
- The Millionaire (1957–1958) (2 episodes)
  - (Season 4 Episode 14: "The Regina Wainwright Story") (1957) as Peter Miller
  - (Season 5 Episode 5: "The David Barrett Story") (1958) as David Barrett
- Dick Powell's Zane Grey Theatre (1957–1959) (4 episodes)
  - (Season 1 Episode 23: "There Were Four") (1957) as Danny Ensign
  - (Season 2 Episode 14: "Trial by Fear") (1958) as Tod Owen
  - (Season 3 Episode 1: "Trail to Nowhere") (1958) as Seth Larker
  - (Season 3 Episode 15: "Hang the Heart High") (1959) as Dix Porter
- Richard Diamond, Private Detective (1957–1960) (77 episodes) as Richard Diamond / Chuck Garrett
- Sheriff of Cochise (1958) (Season 3 Episode 9: "The Turkey Farmers") as Arnie Hix
- Westinghouse Desilu Playhouse (1959) (Season 1 Episode 25: "Two Counts of Murder") as Ross Ingraham
- Death Valley Days (1961) (Season 9 Episode 18: "Deadline at Austin") as Dr. Bill Breckenridge
- Adventures in Paradise (1961) (Season 3 Episode 6: "Show Me a Hero") as Scotty Bell
- Naked City (1961–1963) (2 episodes)
  - (Season 3 Episode 5: "A Wednesday Night Story") (1961) as Blair Cameron
  - (Season 4 Episode 26: "On the Battle Front: Every Minute is Important") (1963) as Carl Ashland
- Thriller (1962)
- Target: The Corruptors (1962) (Season 1 Episode 19: "The Middle Man") as Robbie Wilson
- General Electric Theater (1962) (Season 10 Episode 20: "Shadow of a Hero") as Pat Howard
- Follow the Sun (1962) (Season 1 Episode 24: "A Choice of Weapons") as Johnny Sadowsky
- Checkmate (1962) (Season 2 Episode 25: "Ride a Wild Horse") as Len Kobalsky
- Cain's Hundred (1962) (Season 1 Episode 26: "Inside Track") as Dan Mullin
- Kraft Mystery Theatre (1962)
- Route 66 (1962) (Season 3 Episode 1: "One Tiger to a Hill") as Karno Starling
- The Eleventh Hour (1962) (Season 1 Episode 3: "Make Me a Place") as Hal Kincaid
- The Dick Powell Show (1963) (Season 2 Episode 23: "Thunder in a Forgotten Town") as Kenneth 'Ken' Morgan
- The Fugitive (1963–1967) (120 episodes) as Dr. Richard Kimble / varied aliases
- The Hollywood Palace (1965)
- O'Hara, U.S. Treasury (1971–1972) (23 episodes) as James O'Hara / Jim O'Hara
- Cannon (1973) (Season 3 Episode 1: "He Who Digs a Grave") as Ian Kirk
- Harry O (1973–1976) (45 episodes) as Harry Orwell
- Police Story (1977) (Season 5 Episode 1: "Trigger Point") as Sergeant Joe Wilson
- The Word (1978) (miniseries) (all 4 episodes) as Steve Randall
- Centennial (1978–1979) (Narrator for all 12 episodes) (10 episodes as Paul Garrett)
- Biography (1979) as Host

== Bibliography ==
- Aldous, Steve; Gillies, Gary (2025). The Harry O Viewing Companion: History and Episodes of the Classic Detective Series. Jefferson, NC: McFarland. ISBN 9781476694290. OCLC 1443716997.
- Janssen, Ellie; Phelps, J.D. Michael (1994). David Janssen – My Fugitive. Hollywood, Fla.: Lifetime Books. ISBN 978-0811907972. OCLC 31134272.
- David Janssen – Our Conversations: The Early Years (1965–1972): Volume 1 Michael Phelps ISBN 978-0988777828
- David Janssen: Our Conversations: The Final Years: (1973–1980): Volume 2 Michael Phelps ISBN 978-0988777811
