= X Marks the Spot =

X Marks the Spot may refer to:

== Film and television ==
- X Marks the Spot (1931 film), a crime drama directed by Erle C. Kenton
- X Marks the Spot (1942 film), a film noir crime drama directed by George Sherman
- X Marks the Spot, a 1944 social guidance film, spoofed in season 2 of Mystery Science Theater 3000
- "X Marks the Spot" (Battle for Dream Island), a 2020 web series episode
- "X Marks the Spot", an episode of the television series Never the Twain
- "Ex Marks the Spot" (Time Squad), a 2003 TV episode

== Music ==
- X Marks the Spot (album), 1991, by Ex Girlfriend
- "X Marks the Spot", a song by Coldplay on their 2015 album A Head Full of Dreams
- "X Marks the Spot", a song by Jim Noir on his 2012 album Jimmy's Show
- "X Marks the Spot", a song by Sonata Arctica on their 2014 album Pariah's Child
- "Planet X Marks The Spot", a song by Doctor Steel

== See also ==
- X mark
- X (disambiguation)
- "X Spots the Mark", a 2007 episode of The Richies
- Pirates in popular culture
