= John Carradine filmography =

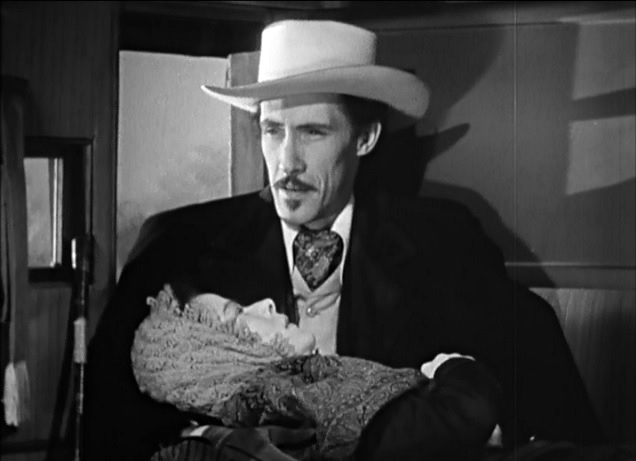
Carradine in Stagecoach (1939)

This is a list of John Carradine's hundreds of theatrical films. Television appearances and television movies are not included.

== 1930s ==
1. Bright Lights (1930) as Telegraph Newspaper Photographer (uncredited)
2. Tol'able David (1930) as Buzzard Hatburn (as Peter Richmond)
3. Heaven on Earth (1931) as Chicken Sam (as Peter Richmond)
4. Forgotten Commandments (1932) as First Orator (uncredited)
5. The Sign of the Cross (1932) as Christian Martyr / Gladiator Leader / Voice in Coliseum Mob / Voice of Roman (uncredited)
6. Murders in the Rue Morgue (1932) (uncredited)
7. The Story of Temple Drake (1933) as Courtroom Spectator (uncredited)
8. Morning Glory (1933) as Dream Apparition (uncredited)
9. This Day and Age (1933) as Assistant Principal Abernathy
10. To the Last Man (1933) as Pete Garon (uncredited)
11. The Invisible Man (1933) as Informer Suggesting Ink (uncredited)
12. The Meanest Gal in Town (1934) as Stranded Actor (uncredited)
13. The Black Cat (1934) as Cult Organist (uncredited)
14. Cleopatra (1934) as Roman Citizen / Party Guest / Soldier (voice, uncredited)
15. Clive of India (1935) as Drunken-Faced Clerk (uncredited)
16. Transient Lady (1935) as Ren Baxter (uncredited)
17. Captain Blood (1935) as Spanish Pirate (uncredited)
18. Les Misérables (1935) as Enjolras
19. Cardinal Richelieu (1935) as Agitator
20. Bride of Frankenstein (1935) as Hunter at Hermit's Cottage (uncredited)
21. Alias Mary Dow (1935) as Griffe - Nightclub Drunk (uncredited)
22. She Gets Her Man (1935) as Lunchroom customer (uncredited)
23. The Crusades (1935) as Leopold - Duke of Austria / A French King / A Wise Man (uncredited)
24. Bad Boy (1935) as Angry Saxophone Player - Tenant (uncredited)
25. The Man Who Broke the Bank at Monte Carlo (1935) as Despondent Casino Gambler (uncredited)
26. Dublin in Brass (1935) (uncredited)
27. Anything Goes (1936) as Bearded Ballet Master (uncredited)
28. The Prisoner of Shark Island (1936) as Sgt. Rankin
29. A Message to Garcia (1936) as President William McKinley (voice, uncredited)
30. Under Two Flags (1936) as Cafard
31. Half Angel (1936) as Sanatorium Inmate (voice, uncredited)
32. White Fang (1936) as Beauty Smith
33. Mary of Scotland (1936) as David Rizzio
34. Ramona (1936) as Jim Farrar
35. Dimples (1936) as Richards
36. The Garden of Allah (1936) as Sand Diviner
37. Daniel Boone (1936) as Simon Girty
38. Winterset (1936) as Bartolomio Romagna
39. Laughing at Trouble (1936) as Deputy Sheriff Alec Brady
40. Nancy Steele Is Missing! (1937) as Harry Wilkins
41. Captains Courageous (1937) as 'Long Jack'
42. This Is My Affair (1937) as Ed
43. Love Under Fire (1937) as Capt. Delmar
44. Danger - Love at Work (1937) as Herbert Pemberton
45. Ali Baba Goes to Town (1937) as Ishak / Broderick
46. The Hurricane (1937) as Warden
47. The Last Gangster (1937) as Casper
48. Thank You, Mr. Moto (1937) as Pereira
49. International Settlement (1938) as Murdock
50. Of Human Hearts (1938) as President Lincoln
51. Four Men and a Prayer (1938) as General Adolfo Arturios Gregario Sebastian
52. Kentucky Moonshine (1938) as Reef Hatfield
53. Alexander's Ragtime Band (1938) as Taxi Driver
54. Kidnapped (1938) as Gordon
55. I'll Give a Million (1938) as Kopelpeck
56. Gateway (1938) as Leader of Refugees
57. Submarine Patrol (1938) as McAllison
58. Jesse James (1939) as Bob Ford
59. Mr. Moto's Last Warning (1939) as Danforth / Richard Burke
60. Stagecoach (1939) as Hatfield
61. The Three Musketeers (1939) as Naveau
62. The Hound of the Baskervilles (1939) as Barryman
63. Captain Fury (1939) as Coughy / Roger Bradford
64. Five Came Back (1939) as Crimp
65. Frontier Marshal (1939) as Ben Carter
66. Drums Along the Mohawk (1939) as Caldwell

== 1940s ==
1. The Grapes of Wrath (1940) as Jim Casy
2. The Return of Frank James (1940) as Bob Ford
3. Brigham Young (1940) as Porter Rockwell
4. Chad Hanna (1940) as B.D. Bisbee
5. Western Union (1941) as Doc Murdoch
6. Blood and Sand (1941) as El Nacional
7. Man Hunt (1941) as Mr. Jones
8. Swamp Water (1941) as Jesse Wick
9. Son of Fury: The Story of Benjamin Blake (1942) as Caleb Green
10. Whispering Ghosts (1942) as Norbert (Long Jack)
11. Northwest Rangers (1942) as Martin Caswell
12. Reunion in France (1942) as Ulrich Windler
13. I Escaped from the Gestapo (1943) as Martin - Gestapo Agent
14. Captive Wild Woman (1943) as Dr. Sigmund Walters
15. Hitler's Madman (1943) as Reinhardt Heydrich
16. Silver Spurs (1943) as Lucky Miller
17. Isle of Forgotten Sins (1943) (a.k.a. Monsoon) as Mike Clancy
18. Revenge of the Zombies (1943) as Dr. Max Heinrich Von Altermann
19. Gangway for Tomorrow (1943) as Mr. Wellington
20. Voodoo Man (1944) as Toby
21. The Adventures of Mark Twain (1944) as Bret Harte
22. The Black Parachute (1944) as General von Bodenbach
23. The Invisible Man's Revenge (1944) as Doctor Peter Drury
24. Waterfront (1944) as Victor Marlow
25. The Mummy's Ghost (1944) as Yousef Bey
26. Return of the Ape Man (1944) as Prof. John Gilmore
27. Barbary Coast Gent (1944) as Duke Cleat
28. Bluebeard (1944) as Gaston Morel
29. Alaska (1944) as John Reagan
30. House of Frankenstein (1944) as Count Dracula / Baron Latos
31. It's in the Bag! (1945) as Jefferson T. Pike
32. Fallen Angel (1945) as Professor Madley
33. Captain Kidd (1945) as Orange Povy
34. House of Dracula (1945) as Count Dracula / Baron Latos
35. The Face of Marble (1946) as Dr. Charles Randolph
36. Down Missouri Way (1946) as Thorndyke 'Thorny' P. Dunning
37. The Private Affairs of Bel Ami (1947) as Charles Forestier
38. C-Man (1949) as Doc Spencer

== 1950s ==
1. Casanova's Big Night (1954) as Minister Foressi
2. Johnny Guitar (1954) as Old Tom
3. The Egyptian (1954) as Grave Robber
4. Thunder Pass (1954) as Bergstrom
5. Female Jungle (1955) as Claude Almstead
6. Stranger on Horseback (1955) as Col. Buck Streeter
7. The Kentuckian (1955) as Ziby Fletcher
8. Desert Sands (1955) as Jala the Wine Merchant
9. The Court Jester (1956) as Giacomo
10. Dark Venture (1956) as Gideon
11. Hidden Guns (1956) as Snipe Harding
12. The Black Sleep (1956) as Borg a.k.a. Bohemond
13. The Ten Commandments (1956) as Aaron
14. Around the World in 80 Days (1956) as Col. Stamp Proctor - San Francisco Politico
15. The True Story of Jesse James (1957) as Rev. Jethro Bailey
16. The Unearthly (1957) as Dr. Charles Conway
17. The Story of Mankind (1957) as Khufu
18. Hell Ship Mutiny (1957) as Malone
19. The Incredible Petrified World (1957) as Prof. Millard Wyman
20. Showdown at Boot Hill (1958) as Doc Weber
21. The Proud Rebel (1958) as Traveling Salesman
22. The Last Hurrah (1958) as Amos Force
23. Half Human: The Story of the Abominable Snowman (1958) as Dr. John Rayburn - Narrator (English version only)
24. The Cosmic Man (1959) as Cosmic Man
25. Invisible Invaders (1959) as Dr. Karol Noymann
26. Invasion of the Animal People (1959) as Voice of Narrator (English version only)
27. The Oregon Trail (1959) as Zachariah Garrison

== 1960s ==
1. The Adventures of Huckleberry Finn (1960) as Slave Catcher
2. Tarzan the Magnificent (1960) as Abel Banton
3. Sex Kittens Go to College (1960) as Prof. Watts
4. The Man Who Shot Liberty Valance (1962) as Maj. Cassius Starbuckle
5. The Patsy (1964) as Bruce Alden
6. Cheyenne Autumn (1964) as Jeff Blair
7. Genesis (1964) as Narrator
8. Curse of the Stone Hand (1964) as The Old Drunk
9. The Wizard of Mars (1965) as The Wizard of Mars
10. Psycho A-Go-Go (1965) as Dr. Vanard
11. House of the Black Death (1965) as Andre Desard
12. Broken Sabre (1965-1966) as General Joshua McCord
13. The Emperor's New Clothes (1966) as King Luvimself
14. Billy the Kid Versus Dracula (1966) as a nameless vampire, posing as James Underhill
15. Munster, Go Home! (1966) as Cruikshank
16. Red Zone Cuba (1966) as Mr. Wilson
17. The Fiend with the Electronic Brain (1966) as Dr. Howard Vanard
18. The Green Hornet (1966-1967) as James Rancourt / The Scarf
19. Dr. Terror's Gallery of Horrors (1967) as Narrator / Tristram Halbin
20. Hillbillys in a Haunted House (1967) as Dr. Himmil
21. The Hostage (1967) as Otis Lovelace
22. Antologia del miedo (1968) (short)
23. The Helicopter Spies (1968) as Third-Way Priest
24. They Ran for Their Lives (1968) as Laslo
25. The Astro-Zombies (1968) as Dr. DeMarco
26. Autopsia de un fantasma (1968) (a.k.a. Autopsy of a Ghost) as Satán
27. Pacto diabólico (1969) (a.k.a. Diabolical Pact) as Dr. Halback
28. The Trouble with Girls (1969) as Mr. Drewcolt
29. Blood of Dracula's Castle (1969) as George - the butler
30. Las Vampiras (1969) (a.k.a. The Vampires) as Count Branos Alucard
31. The Good Guys and the Bad Guys (1969) as Ticker
32. Five Bloody Graves (1969) as Boone Hawkins
33. Enigma de muerte (1969) as Mad Doctor / Nazi Leader
34. La señora Muerte (1969) (a.k.a. Madame Death) as Dr. Favel
35. The Mummy and the Curse of the Jackals (1969) as Prof. Cummings

== 1970s ==
1. Hell's Bloody Devils (1970) (a.k.a. The Fakers (TV title)) as Pet Shop Owner
2. Cain's Cutthroats (1970) as Preacher Simms
3. Horror of the Blood Monsters (1970) (a.k.a. Creatures of the Prehistoric Planet, Creatures of the Red Planet, Space Mission to the Lost Planet, Vampire Men of the Lost Planet) as Dr. Rynning
4. Blood of the Iron Maiden (1970) (a.k.a. Trip to Terror (reissue title)) as Dr. Goolie
5. Myra Breckinridge (1970) as Surgeon
6. Shinbone Alley (1970) as Tyrone T. Tattersall (voice)
7. The McMasters (1970) as Preacher
8. Bigfoot (1970) as Jasper B. Hawks
9. Honey Britches (1971) as The Judge of Hell (uncredited)
10. Blood Legacy (1971) (a.k.a. Legacy of Blood) as Christopher Dean
11. Beast of the Yellow Night (1971)
12. The Gatling Gun (1971) as Rev. Harper
13. The Seven Minutes (1971) as Sean O'Flanagan
14. Boxcar Bertha (1972) as H. Buckram Sartoris
15. Portnoy's Complaint (1972) as Judge (voice, uncredited)
16. Richard (1972) as Plastic Surgeon
17. Everything You Always Wanted to Know About Sex* (*But Were Afraid to Ask) (1972) as Doctor Bernardo
18. Silent Night, Bloody Night (1972) as Charlie Towman
19. Blood of Ghastly Horror (1972) as Dr. Howard Vanard...19 # Kung fu 1972/1975 as serenity
20. Terror in the Wax Museum (1973) as Claude Dupree
21. Bad Charleston Charlie (1973) as Fritz Frugal - Reporter
22. Superchick (1973) as Igor Smith
23. The Cat Creature (1973) as Hotel Clerk
24. Shadow House (1973) as Uncle (short)
25. The House of Seven Corpses (1974) as Edgar Price
26. Moonchild (1974) as Mr. Walker
27. Mary, Mary, Bloody Mary (1975) as The Man
28. Won Ton Ton, the Dog Who Saved Hollywood (1976) as Drunk
29. The Shootist (1976) as Beckum
30. The Killer Inside Me (1976) as Dr. Jason Smith
31. The Last Tycoon (1976) as Tour Guide
32. Crash! (1977) as Dr. Welsey Edwards
33. The Sentinel (1977) as Father Halliran
34. Tail Gunner Joe (1977) as Wisconsin Farmer
35. Satan's Cheerleaders (1977) as The Bum
36. The White Buffalo (1977) as Amos Briggs (Undertaker)
37. The Mouse and His Child (1977) as The Tramp (voice)
38. Shock Waves (1977) as Captain Ben Morris
39. Golden Rendezvous (1977) (a.k.a. Nuclear Terror) as Fairweather
40. Christmas Miracle in Caufield, U.S.A. (1977) as Grampa Sullivan
41. The Lady and the Lynchings (1977)
42. Doctor Dracula (1978) (a.k.a. Svengali) as Hadley Radcliff
43. Sunset Cove (1978/I) as Judge Harley Winslow
44. Vampire Hookers (1978) as Richmond Reed
45. The Bees (1978) as Dr. Sigmund Hummel
46. The Seekers (1979) as Avery Mills
47. Missile X: The Neutron Bomb Incident (1978) (a.k.a. Teheran Incident and Cruise Missile) as Professor Nikolaeff
48. Nocturna: Granddaughter of Dracula (1979) as Count Dracula

== 1980s ==
1. Monster (1980) (a.k.a. Monstroid and The Toxic Horror) as The Priest
2. The Boogeyman (1980) as Dr. Warren
3. The Howling (1981) as Erle Kenton
4. The Monster Club (1981) as Ronald Chetwynd-Hayes
5. The Nesting (1981) (a.k.a. Massacre Mansion) as Col. LeBrun
6. Goliath Awaits (1981) as Ronald Bentley
7. Frankenstein Island (1981) as Dr. Frankenstein
8. Aladdin and the Magic Lamp (1982) as The Wizard (voice)
9. The Scarecrow (1982) as Hubert Salter
10. Satan's Mistress (1982) as Father Stratten
11. The Secret of NIMH (1982) as the Great Owl (voice)
12. The Vals (1983) (a.k.a. Valley Girls) as Mr. Stanton - Head of the Orphanage
13. House of the Long Shadows (1983) as Lord Elijah Grisbane
14. A Rose for Emily (1983) as Col. Sartoris (short)
15. The Ice Pirates (1984) as Supreme Commander
16. Evils of the Night (1985) as Dr. Kozmar
17. Prison Ship (1986) (a.k.a. Star Slammer) as The Justice
18. Revenge (1986) (direct to video) (a.k.a. Revenge: Blood Cult 2) as Sen. Martin Bradford
19. The Tomb (1986) as Mr. Andoheb
20. Monster in the Closet (1986) as Old Joe Shempter
21. Peggy Sue Got Married (1986) as Leo
22. Evil Spawn (1987) as Dr. Emil Zeitman

== 1990s (Posthumous) ==
1. Buried Alive (filmed in 1988; released in 1990) as Jacob Julian
2. Jack-O (filmed in 1988; released in 1995) as Walter Machen (final film role)
