= Man Beast (film) =

1956 film directed by Jerry Warren

- Theatrical release poster
- Directed by: Jerry Warren
- Screenplay by: B. Arthur Cassidy
- Produced by: Jerry Warren
- Starring: Rock Madison; Asa Maynor; George Skaff; Tom Maruzzi
- Cinematography: Victor Fisher
- Edited by: James R. Sweeney
- Music by: Josef Zimanich
- Production companies: Jerry Warren Productions, Inc.; Associated Producers, Inc.
- Release date: April 1956
- Running time: 67 minutes
- Country: United States
- Language: English

Man Beast is a 1956 American horror film directed and produced by Jerry Warren. It was Warren's first directorial effort and the first film distributed by his Associated Producers, Inc. The film is about a young woman who persuades some mountain climbers to trek up to the Himalayas to attempt to find her missing brother, who hasn't been heard from since he went there on an earlier expedition to find the Abominable Snowman. A mysterious guide befriends them, but winds up actually in league with the Yetis who inhabit the mountains, and he secretly works against the explorers behind their backs, killing them off one by one.

Film historian Bill Warren said a lot of the mountain climbing footage was taken from an unfinished foreign film, "probably of Mexican origin". The film was shown as early as April 1956, and opened in Los Angeles on December 5, 1956. The film was distributed in the United States as a double feature with Prehistoric Women.

== Plot ==
Connie Hayward (Virginia Maynor) and Trevor Hudson (Lloyd Nelson) travel to the Himalayas with a guide named Steve (Tom Maruzzi) to locate Connie's missing brother, who disappeared in that region while on an earlier expedition looking for the Abominable Snowman. Together with the help of a Dr. Erickson (George Wells Lewis), they manage to locate her brother's camp, but it is abandoned, except for a mysterious native guide named Varga (George Skaff) who attempts to befriend them.

The group is attacked by the snowmen, with the treacherous Varga secretly working against the members of the expedition. Hudson falls off a cliff while being chased by a yeti, and Dr. Erickson is lured into a cave by Varga, who then shoots him dead. When most of the party is dead, Varga reveals to Connie that he is actually a fifth-generation descendant of Yeti, who for decades have been kidnapping human women and forcing them to breed with the male snowmen in an attempt to eventually wipe out the yeti strain from their DNA. He plots to kidnap Connie and mate with her, so that their progeny will be another step closer to being human.

Steve comes to Connie's rescue, and manages to knock Varga unconscious. Steve and Connie attempt to escape down the mountain, but Varga follows them down a rope to insure they do not make it. The rope slips loose from its mooring, Varga falls to his death, and Connie and Steve (now in love) make their way back to civilization.

== Cast ==
- Tom Maruzzi as Steve Cameron
- Virginia Maynor (aka Asa Maynor) as Connie Hayward
- George Skaff as Varga
- George Wells as Dr. Erickson
- Lloyd Nelson (aka Lloyd Cameron) as Trevor Hudson
- Jack Haffner
- Brianne Murphy as the Yeti
- Wong Sing

Listed among the cast was a "Rock Madison", which was a fictitious name made up by Jerry Warren to make the cast appear to be larger than it was.

== Production ==
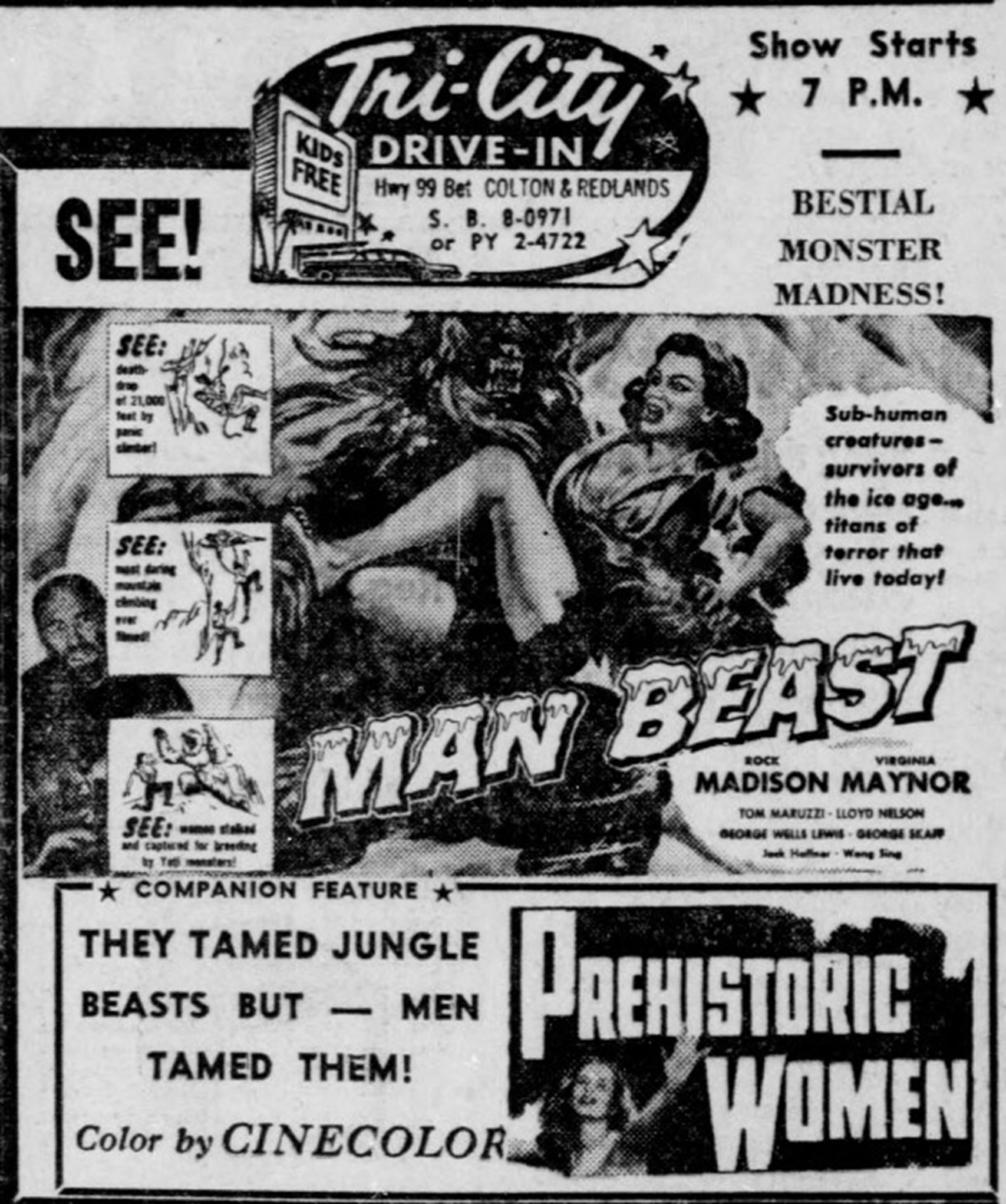
Drive-in advertisement from 1956 for Man Beast and co-feature, Prehistoric Women.

Warren grew up wanting to get into the film business in Los Angeles. He appeared in small parts in a few 1940s films such as Ghost Catchers, Anchors Aweigh and Unconquered. After meeting with producers, he took on his first film as a director and producer with Man Beast. Discussing his choice of topic, Warren later explained that the Abominable Snowman was receiving a lot of publicity at the time, and thought it seemed like "a natural for my first picture".

He rented the small Keywest Studio off Santa Monica Boulevard in Hollywood, and cast the film with actors from the Pasadena Playhouse and other small theater groups. He also used Hollywood's famous Bronson Cavern as a background for some of the exterior scenes, and spliced in stock footage from an old 1940s Monogram picture and some old Allied Artists Studios pictures. Lloyd Nelson (billed as Lloyd Cameron in the credits) stated the script for the film was created around footage they had bought from an unnamed Mexican film that was never finished, stating "they wrote a script around what they had".

To film certain scenes representing Tibet, Warren had his actors climb over a fence into a major studio lot and shoot the scenes on their Mongolian sets. Warren reworked the old gorilla costume from the PRC film White Pongo into his Man-Beast. When asked about the budget for the film, Warren described it as "about one-half of what the normal low-budget picture cost in those days. This was very, very low-budget."

Although a "Rock Madison" was given top billing in the credits for playing the part of "Lon Raynon," there is no such character anywhere in the film. Modern sources state that "Rock Madison" was just a fake name made up by Jerry Warren to make his cast seem larger. Older sources used to state that Rock Madison may have been the man in the Yeti costume, but Warren's ex-wife Brianne Murphy said years later in an interview that she played the man-beast herself. She said Warren met her in Hollywood around this time and offered her a $50-a-week job handling props, makeup, hair, wardrobe, script and stills on "Man Beast." She said she wore the furry Snowman costume in a couple of scenes, but she was too short for the suffocating rubber suit.

Brianne Murphy also stated she had no idea who the credited screenwriter "B. Arthur Cassidy" was either, saying it may have been Jerry Warren himself under an alias. Warren wrote some of his films' screenplays under the pen name "Jacques Lecoutier" (which he sometimes misspelled in the credits).

Murphy and Warren were wed right after finishing Man Beast in 1956, and went on a honeymoon in Las Vegas, where Warren wrote the screenplay for Teenage Zombies in less than a week.

== Release ==
Man Beast was shown as early as April 1956, and opened in Los Angeles on December 5, 1956. The film was distributed in California by Favorite Films of California and by states rights release elsewhere. Warren tried to get it distributed as a single feature so he wouldn't have to share the box office receipts, but his film was relegated to a second-billed feature on a flat fee that generated little capital for him. In the future, he tried to put out two films at once on double bills, so he could take the entire box office share for himself.

=== Home media ===
The film was released for the first time on DVD by Rhino Home Video on July 30, 2002. It was later released on DVD by VCI Video on December 10, 2013 as a part of its "Jerry Warren Collection", along with deleted scenes and a Katherine Victor audio interview as extras.

== Reception ==
In contemporary reviews, Variety referred to the film as "exploitable, but just fair entertainment wise." Motion Picture Exhibitor declared it "hardly more than filler for the lower half" In Leonard Maltin's Movie Guide, it was rated BOMB, his lowest rating.

Fred Olen Ray wrote, "Man-Beast leaves quite a bit to be desired. It is slow, plodding and incredibly boring. Even the sight of the dreaded Man Beast himself does not pull this one out."
