= The Wild World of Batwoman =

- Theatrical release poster
- Directed by: Jerry Warren
- Written by: Jerry Warren
- Produced by: Jerry Warren
- Starring: Katherine Victor; George Andre; Steve Brodie; Lloyd Nelson; Richard Banks
- Cinematography: William G. Troiano
- Edited by: Jerry Warren
- Distributed by: ADP Productions
- Release date: 1966
- Running time: 66 min.
- Country: United States
- Language: English

The Wild World of Batwoman is a 1966 American science fiction comedy superhero film produced, written, directed, and edited by Jerry Warren. The film stars Katherine Victor as Batwoman, George Andre as Professor G. Octavius Neon, and Steve Brodie as Jim Flanagan. Several women portray Batwoman's group of sidekicks, the Batgirls. The film is considered to be one of the worst movies ever made.

With the popularity of the Batman television series, director Jerry Warren decided to make his own superhero bat-film. After being sued for copyright infringement, Warren re-released the film under the title She Was a Hippy Vampire.

Despite its reputation, the film also stands as the first English-language motion picture to feature a female superhero and (notwithstanding made-for-television films) the last of its kind until the release of Supergirl some 18 years later.

== Plot ==
Batwoman enjoys the services of several young female agents known as Batgirls in her pursuit of justice. Her archenemy is a masked villain named Rat Fink. Added to the mix is the president and vice president of the Ayjax Development Corporation.

The company, using plutonium as its fuel source, has created a powerful listening device called the Atomic Hearing Aid, which allows for limitless eavesdropping. The company tried to sell the device to the U. S. government, but they were not interested due to its unstable power supply. Instead, they ordered the company to destroy the device. The president of Ayjax refused to destroy it, and Rat Fink is pressuring the company to give him the device.

The vice president of Ayjax recruits Batwoman to protect the device, but Rat Fink's minions use drugged bowls of soup to incapacitate Batwoman and her Batgirls and steal the device. The superheroines storm Rat Fink's lair and retrieve it, unmasking Rat Fink and converting one of his minions, Tiger, to the side of justice after he falls in love with one of the Batgirls.

== Cast ==
- Katherine Victor as Batwoman
- George Andre as Professor G. Octavius Neon
- Steve Brodie as Jim Flanagan, vice president of Ayjax
- Richard Banks as Rat Fink / president of Ayjax
- Steve Conte as Bruno
- Mel Oshins as Tiger
- Bruno VeSota as Seltzer
- Bob Arbogast as Spirits in Séance (voice)
- Lloyd Nelson as Heathcliff

== Production ==
The original idea for the film began with Jerry Warren realizing there was large popularity with the comic book superhero Batman; Warren decided to make his own Batman-like superhero character into a film. Warren offered the leading role to Katherine Victor. Having worked on Warren's previous productions such as Teenage Zombies and Curse of the Stone Hand, Victor was originally not very excited about working with Warren again. To convince her, Warren promised Victor large production values, color photography and her own Bat Boat in the film. None of these promises ever came to fruition. On receiving the script for the role of Seltzer, Bruno VeSota recalled that "...once again I was in for it. It would be like memorizing a telephone book with pages picked at random." Katherine Victor claimed that on set if an actor rubbed Warren the wrong way, their lines would be cut out or given to other actors. Victor claimed "the pretty brunette who was kidnapped in the beginning of the picture was supposed to be the lead girl, but for some reason Jerry thought she was getting too big for her britches and gave all her lines to the girl in the leopard tights".

For the monsters in the film, Warren used footage from the Universal Pictures film The Mole People. Several other scenes throughout the film are also taken from different films, one of which seems to have been from the 1959 Swedish film No Time to Kill, judging by a background sign reading "Livsmedel", a Swedish word used for grocery stores.

== Release ==
Because of the similar title, the production company Associated Distributors Productions was promptly sued by DC Comics for copyright infringement. Warren won this lawsuit. After the lawsuit and as the popularity of the television series Batman died down, Warren re-released the film under the title She Was a Hippy Vampire.

== Reception and legacy ==
Modern reception of the film has been very negative. Fred Beldin of the film database AllMovie gave the film one and a half stars out of five, noting the film as "a rip-off hack job no matter how you slice it, though its innocent veneer, period charm, and forced wackiness might endear the film to fans of similar goofs like Rat Pfink a Boo Boo or The Nasty Rabbit". Film director Fred Olen Ray noted the film has "all the earmarks of Warren's worst work, but rises above the level of something as tedious as Petrified World. It is funny in an unintentional way and sometimes is not hard to look at."

=== Mystery Science Theater 3000 ===
In 1993 The Wild World of Batwoman was featured in episode #515 of Mystery Science Theater 3000 along with the short Cheating. This episode was released later on DVD by Rhino Entertainment and Shout Factory.

== See also ==
- Batman: The Movie, official film adaptation of the hit TV show starring Adam West
