= Steve Conte (actor) =

American actor (1920–1997)

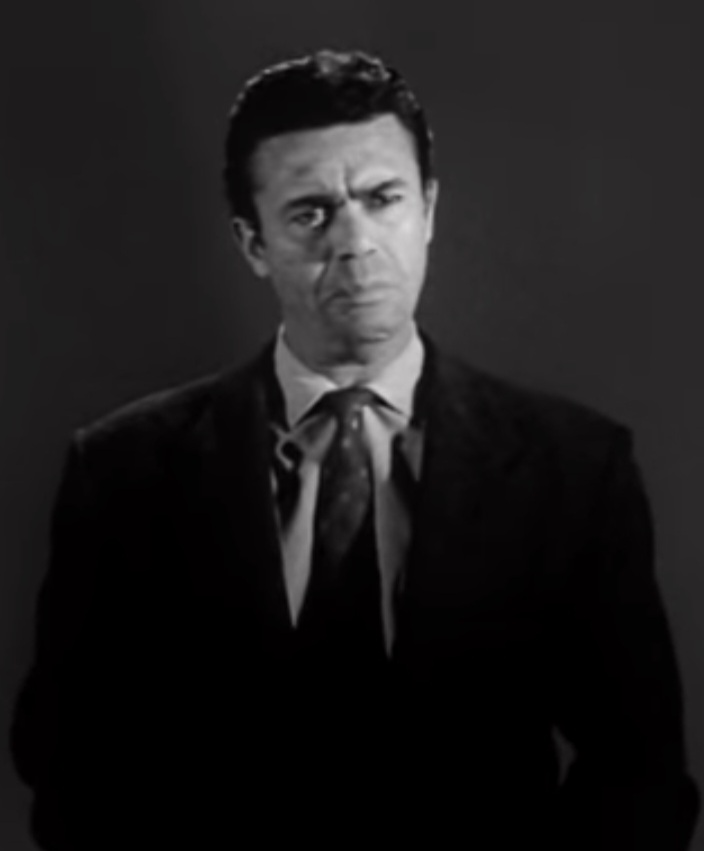
- Conte in Teenage Zombies (1960)
- Born: January 16, 1920; Gagliato, Calabria, Italy
- Died: April 28, 1997 (aged 77); Las Vegas, Nevada, U.S.
- Resting place: Southern Nevada Veterans Memorial Cemetery
- Other name: Steve Conti
- Occupation: Actor
- Years active: 1950–1987
- Spouse(s): Shirley Conte (m. 1945; div. 1950s)
- Children: 2

Steve Conte (January 16, 1920 – April 28, 1997) was an Italian-born American actor who immigrated with his family to the United States in the early 1920s. He often played henchmen, thugs, and criminal types, besides playing ethnicities. His career lasted nearly thirty-seven years in both film and television. He appeared in approximately fifty different television series and more than thirty films. He worked at least a half dozen times with B Grade director Jerry Warren.

== Background ==
Conte was born in Gagliato, Italy. He came with his family via boat to New York. His adolescent years were spent in New York as well. During World War II, he was based in Europe as part of the United States Army Air Corps, the forerunner of the United States Air Force. After the war, he married his wife Shirley, by whom he had two children. Their marriage lasted until their divorce in the 1950s. In 1992, he was reunited with his son Steve, who was born in 1960 and placed for adoption. He died of Alzheimer's disease on April 28, 1997, at the age of 77. He was buried at Southern Nevada Veterans Memorial Cemetery.

As a character actor, he was able to have a good run of work for some time. Many of the roles that he played were of the rugged type.

== Career ==
=== 1950s ===
One of Conte's earliest roles was in 1950 as the road agent in "Shotgun Messenger", the first episode of The Marshal of Gunsight Pass. Also the same year he played Matt Riley in the Western film Gunfire. The following year he played the Apache kid in the "Ten Thousand Reward" episode of The Range Rider. Also that year he played Henchman Mac in Cattle Queen. In 1959, he played Whorf in Teenage Zombies.

In 1952, Conte was cast as a villain, Jerry, in the episode, "Self Made Man," of Death Valley Days.

=== 1960s ===
In 1960, Conte guest starred in the M Squad episode, "The Man Who Lost His Brain". He appeared that same year in the Overland Trail episode "All the O'Mara Horses." He played the role of Doyle Black in The Rifleman S2 E27 "Lariat" in 1960. In 1962, he played Cabot in Terror of the Bloodhunters. In 1966, he appeared in The Wild World of Batwoman (1966).

=== 1970s to 1980s ===
The early 1970s, Conte appeared in such films as The Gatling Gun in the role of Private Mitchell, and in the Sci-Fi The Resurrection of Zachary Wheeler as a radio operator. In the late 1970s, he played a prison guard in the Harold Becker-directed The Onion Field.

One of his last appearances is credited as an orderly in the Jeffrey Obrow/Stephen Carpenter-directed horror film, The Kindred, in 1987.

== Role types ==
=== Thugs and criminals ===
Throughout Conte's career, he played some twenty-three roles as henchman, thug, and criminal types.

He played the part of Henchman Mac in the 1951 film, Cattle Queen of Montana, starring Barbara Stanwyck and Ronald Reagan, and Henchman Lait in the television series, Hopalong Cassidy.

In 1954, Conte played a bandit in the Wild Luke's Boy episode of General Electric Theater. In 1955, he played a henchman in the Dick Ross directed film, Wiretapper, and Cyclops, "One-Eyed Henchman" in the Guns Below the Border episode of The Gene Autry Show. He had also played a henchman in two previous episodes of the show. He played henchmen in three episodes of Batman which were, Penguin Is a Girl's Best Friend, Penguin Sets a Trend, and Penguin's Disastrous End.

== Filmography (selective) ==
=== Television ===
Title	Episode #	Role	Director	Aired	Year	Notes #
The Marshal of Gunsight Pass	Shotgun Messenger	The Road Agent			1950	
The Range Rider	Ten Thousand Reward	Apache Kid	David R. Lederman		1951	
The Gene Autry Show	Trouble at Silver Creek	Henchman Buzz	George Archainbaud	March 9	1952	
The Gene Autry Show	The Trail of the Witch	'Breed' – Lead Henchman	George Archainbaud		1952	
Death Valley Days	Self-Made Man	Barfly	Stuart E. McGowan	December 12	1952	As Steve Conti
Death Valley Days	Cynthy's Dream Dress	First Robber	Stuart E. McGowan	March 3	1953	As Steve Conti
Ramar of the Jungle	Mark of Shaitan	Luku – Head Porter	Paul Landres	June 27	1953	
The Gene Autry Show	Outlaw Stage	Jim, 3rd Robber	Wallace Fox	July 21	1953	
The Gene Autry Show	Border Justice	Ralph, Cleanshaven Henchman	Wallace Fox	August 18	1953	
Hopalong Cassidy	The Jinx Wagon	Henchman Lait	George Archainbaud	November 12	1953	
Mayor of the Town	Happy Birthday	Benson	John Rawlins		1954	
General Electric Theater	Wild Luke's Boy	Bandit	Alfred E. Green	16 May	1954	
The Adventures of Rin-Tin-Tin	The Blushing Brides	Tawshonie	Don McDougall	March 18	1955	
The Adventures of Rin-Tin-Tin	The Ghost Town	Stannard	Robert G. Walker	April 29	1955	
Damon Runyon Theater	Tobias the Terrible		Leslie H. Martinson	21 May	1955	
Death Valley Days	I Am Joaquin	Henchman Garcia	Stuart E. McGowan	June 7	1955	
The Gene Autry Show	Stage to San Dimas	Bert Nixon	George Archainbaud	October 8	1955	
Cheyenne	The Argonauts	Acuna	Richard L. Bare	November 1	1955	
The Gene Autry Show	Guns Below the Border	Cyclops – One-Eyed Henchman	George Archainbaud	November 5	1955	
My Friend Flicka	Wind from Heaven	Robert Gordon	Tim Connell	February 3	1956	
The 20th Century-Fox Hour	Crack-Up	Announcer	Ted Post	February 8	1956	
Death Valley Days	Nevada's Plymouth Rock	Plug Bailey	Stuart E. McGowan	February 13	1956	
The Adventures of Champion	The Real Unfriendly Ghost	Fred Hackett	John English		1956	
The Adventures of Champion	Calhoun Rides Again	Rapp	John English	March 3	1956	
Star Stage	The Sainted General		Herschel Daugherty	April 6	1956	
Adventures of Superman	Jimmy the Kid	Thug No. 2	Philip Ford	April 28	1956	
Buffalo Bill, Jr.	Secret of the Silverado		George Archainbaud	21 May	1956	
Buffalo Bill, Jr.	Angelo Goes West		George Archainbaud	29 May	1956	
Dragnet	The Big Steal			January 17	1957	
Schlitz Playhouse of Stars	Dual Control	Snake	Paul Henreid	November 1	1957	
Batman	Penguin is a Girl's Best Friend/ Penguin Sets a Trend/ Penguin's Disastrous End	Second henchman	Stanford Sherman	January 26, February 1, February 2	1967	

=== Film ===
Title	Year	Role	Director	Notes #
Gunfire	1950	Matt Riley	William Berke	(as Steve Conti)
Cattle Queen	1951	Henchman Mac	Robert Emmett Tansey	
Hiawatha	1952	Minor Role	Kurt Neumann	Uncredited
Goldtown Ghost Riders	1953	Blackwell	George Archainbaud	
Appointment in Honduras	1953	Stranger	Jacques Tourneur	Uncredited
Trader Tom of the China Seas	1954	First Rebel on Horseback	Franklin Adreon	Uncredited
Wiretapper	1955	Henchman	Dick Ross	
A Day of Fury	1956	Mugg	Harmon Jones	Uncredited
I Was a Teenage Werewolf	1957		Gene Fowler Jr.	Uncredited
Gun Battle at Monterey	1957	Posseman	Sidney Franklin; Carl K. Hittleman	Uncredited
The Book of Acts Series	1957	Agrippa II	Eddie Dew	
Vertigo	1958	Burglar	Alfred Hitchcock	Uncredited
The Black Orchid	1958	Hood	Martin Ritt	Uncredited
Teenage Zombies	1960	Whorf	Jerry Warren	
Terror of the Bloodhunters	1962	Cabot	Jerry Warren	
Dangerous Charter	1962	Goon	Robert Gottschalk	Shot in 1958
The Violent and the Damned	1962	Convict	Carl Christensen; Jerry Warren	
Face of the Screaming Werewolf	1964	The Hired Thief	Gilberto Martínez Solares; Rafael López Portillo; Jerry Warren	
Attack of the Mayan Mummy	1964	The Hired Thief	Rafael Portillo; Jerry Warren	TV movie
The Wild World of Batwoman	1966	Bruno	Jerry Warren	
Flareup	1969	Lt. Franklin	James Neilson	
Change of Habit	1969	Man in Scene 166	William Graham	Uncredited
The Gatling Gun	1971	Pvt. Mitchell	Robert Gordon	
The Resurrection of Zachary Wheeler	1971	Radio Opr.#2	Bob Wynn	
The Other Side of the Mountain Part 2	1978	Wrangler	Larry Peerce	
Fast Break	1979	Man on Bus	Jack Smight	
The Onion Field	1979	Prison Guard No. 1	Harold Becker	
Hamburger: The Motion Picture	1986	Security Guard No. 3	Mike Marvin	
The Kindred	1987	Orderly	Jeffrey Obrow; Stephen Carpenter	(final film role)
