= White Pongo =

1945 film by Sam Newfield

- Directed by: Sam Newfield
- Written by: Raymond L. Schrock (story)
- Produced by: Sigmund Neufeld
- Starring: See below
- Cinematography: Jack Greenhalgh
- Edited by: Holbrook N. Todd
- Distributed by: Producers Releasing Corporation
- Release date: 10 October 1945
- Running time: 71 minutes; 10 minutes (US short version)
- Country: United States
- Language: English

White Pongo, also known as Adventure Unlimited in the United Kingdom, is a 1945 American film directed by Sam Newfield released by Producers Releasing Corporation.

== Plot summary ==
In the jungles of the Belgian Congo, a group of natives are dancing around a great fire with a human sacrifice named Gunderson, They are attacked by an albino gorilla called the White Pongo. During the attack, an elderly scientist who lives with the tribe frees Gunderson and gives him his deceased colleague's diary that contains his findings on the white gorilla.

Gunderson makes it through the jungle and arrives in a nearby settlement in a feverish state. The diary has seemed to prove that the white gorilla of myth exists and that local anthropologists believe it is the evolutionary missing link. A safari is formed with a group of individuals, several of whom have their own nefarious reasons for going, but one is an undercover Rhodesian Secret Serviceman. The group battle the jungle and one another. In the climax, the White Pongo, who has been stalking the group, kidnaps one of the safari members (the sole female) and duels with a normal-colored gorilla. The rest of the safari hear the battle and rescue their comrade. The White Pongo comes out victorious over his rival, but is wounded by the safari and taken with them to the boat back to London.

== Cast ==
- Richard Fraser as Geoffrey Bishop
- Maris Wrixon as Pamela Bragdon
- Lionel Royce as Peter Van Dorn
- Al Eben as Hans Kroegert
- Gordon Richards as Sir Harry Bragdon
- Michael Dyne as Clive Carswell
- George Lloyd as Baxter
- Larry Steers as Doctor Kent
- Milton Kibbee as Gunderson
- Egon Brecher as Dr. Gerig
- Joel Fluellen as Mumbo Jumbo

Uncredited: Ray "Crash" Corrigan as the White Pongo.

== Production ==
Ray Corrigan, a Western actor, was an experienced "gorilla man," and played a similar role earlier that year in The White Gorilla, where he starred both as a jungle explorer and as the gorilla. The White Pongo costume was years later brought out of storage to be used as the monster suit in Jerry Warren's 1956 Abominable Snowman movie, Man Beast.

== Soundtrack ==
Leo Erdody was the musical director.
