= Jerry Warren =

American actor and film producer (1925–1988)

- Born: March 10, 1925
- Died: August 21, 1988 (aged 63); Escondido, California, U.S.
- Occupations: Film director, producer, editor, screenwriter, cinematographer, actor
- Years active: 1944–1981
- Spouse(s): Brianne Murphy (m. 1956; divorced, 1959)

Jerry Warren (March 10, 1925 – August 21, 1988) was an American film director, producer, editor, screenwriter, cinematographer, and actor. Warren grew up wanting to get into the film business in Los Angeles, California. He appeared in small parts in a few 1940s films such as Ghost Catchers, Anchors Aweigh, and Unconquered.

After meeting with producers, Warren took on his first film as a director and producer with Man Beast in 1956. He initially created his own films, although relying heavily on stock footage. Later, he would just buy foreign films that already existed and re-edit them, dubbing some scenes in English and inserting new footage which he shot with American actors such as John Carradine and Katherine Victor. Warren even wrote some screenplays for his films under the pen name "Jacques Lecoutier", which he sometimes misspelled in the credits.

== Career ==
Warren is known for producing and directing a number of cult films such as Teenage Zombies, The Incredible Petrified World, Terror of the Bloodhunters, and the aforementioned Man Beast. After creating and distributing these first four of his own films, Warren decided that producing original features from scratch required entirely too much money and effort, so he began buying and distributing foreign-made films through his own distribution company, Associated Distributors Pictures Inc., or ADP. His first such involved purchasing the Swedish science fiction film Space Invasion of Lapland, and editing it into his own version re-titled Invasion of the Animal People. This 1958 Swedish feature was originally filmed in Lapland by Virgil Vogel in the English language. Warren released his version in the United States on May 3, 1962 as a double feature with his film Terror of the Bloodhunters starring Robert Clarke.

Warren released three other re-edited foreign films in 1963, Bullet for Billy the Kid, The Violent and the Damned, and No Time to Kill. Filmed in color, Billy the Kid features added scenes with Steve Brodie and Lloyd Nelson, spliced into the original Mexican film's storyline about an outlaw (Gaston Santos) who wants to hang up his guns. The Violent and the Damned is a 1954 Brazilian action feature originally titled "Mãos Sangrentas" that hit theaters in 1962 with additional scenes added, featuring Warren regular Bruno Ve Sota, about a convicted wife-killer who escapes from prison via a perilous jungle route. No Time to Kill is a Swedish film, again made in English, starring John Ireland, shot in 1958 that Warren purchased, about a man who spends eight years in prison after being falsely convicted of arson. No new scenes were added, but about 10 minutes was edited out of the original film. It was released on a double bill with The Violent and the Damned.

From 1963 to 1965, Warren re-edited several other foreign horror films, re-titling them all and adding newly filmed sequences to them. La Momia Azteca, a Mexican horror film, was heavily re-edited into his U.S. version Attack of the Mayan Mummy, which was syndicated directly to TV, and footage from the same mummy film (both original Mexican footage and Warren-made footage) later was recycled into Warren's Face of the Screaming Werewolf, which also included principal footage from the Mexican comedy-horror film La Casa del Terror which had starred Lon Chaney Jr., plus additional added footage by Warren.

In 1963–1964, the Mexican film La Marca del Muerto was edited into Warren's Creature of the Walking Dead, followed by his Curse of the Stone Hand which he edited from two 1940's Chilean films that he had purchased, La casa está vacía and La dama de la muerte. Added footage on Curse of the Stone Hand, which was released on a double-bill with Face of the Screaming Werewolf, featured John Carradine.

Warren was hired to film some extra footage in 1965 to pad out the running time of another American producer's film titled Blood of the Man-Devil which starred Lon Chaney Jr. and John Carradine. The film was later released to television as House of the Black Death.

Warren produced an all-original film called The Wild World of Batwoman in 1966 which stars Katherine Victor and Bruno Ve Sota. He did not produce another film after that until he released his final motion picture, Frankenstein Island in 1981, starring his biggest name cast of Katherine Victor, John Carradine, Cameron Mitchell, Steve Brodie and Robert Clarke.

== Style ==
Warren often cut out all of a foreign film's dialogue and would shoot new scenes in which the American actors would try to explain the plot, sometimes using extensive voice-over narration, or adding scenes in which his actors would simply sit in front of the camera and just talk to each other.

Warren said in a 1988 interview with Tom Weaver, "I'd shoot one day on this stuff and throw it together...I was in the business to make money. I never, ever tried in any way to compete, or to make something worthwhile. I only did enough to get by, so they would buy it, so it would play, and so I'd get a few dollars. It's not very fair to the public, I guess, but that was my attitude...You didn't have to go all out and make a really good picture."

== Personal life ==
Warren was married to cinematographer Brianne Murphy. Warren and Murphy met in 1956 while Warren was preparing to film Man Beast and they married in Las Vegas, Nevada, after he finished the film. During the honeymoon, Warren wrote the script for Teenage Zombies in less than a week.

Murphy worked with Warren as a production/wardrobe manager and dialogue director on two of his pictures, Teenage Zombies and The Incredible Petrified World. She also played "Pam" in Teenage Zombies and the Yeti creature in Man Beast. They divorced in 1959.

On August 21, 1988, Warren died of lung cancer in Escondido, California. Brianne Murphy died in 2003 from metastatic brain cancer after first fighting lung cancer.

== Legacy ==
Warren's films, specifically Wild World of Batwoman, Invasion of the Animal People and Frankenstein Island, have been spoofed by the cult television series Mystery Science Theater 3000 and its successful spin-off, RiffTrax.

== Filmography ==
| Year | Title | Role | Notes |
|---|---|---|---|
| 1944 | Ghost Catchers | Jitterbug | Uncredited actor |
| 1945 | Where Do We Go from Here? | | Uncredited actor |
| 1945 | Anchors Aweigh | | Uncredited actor |
| 1947 | Unconquered | | Uncredited actor |
| 1956 | Man Beast | —N/a | Director and producer |
| 1959 | The Incredible Petrified World | Plane Passenger | Director, producer (and cameo) |
| 1959 | Teenage Zombies | —N/a | Writer, director, producer, editor |
| 1962 | Invasion of the Animal People | —N/a | Editor, distributor |
| 1962 | Terror of the Bloodhunters | —N/a | Writer, director, producer, editor |
| 1962 | The Violent and the Damned | —N/a | Editor, distributor |
| 1963 | Bullet for Billy the Kid | —N/a | Editor, distributor |
| 1963 | No Time To Kill | —N/a | Editor, distributor |
| 1963 | Attack of the Mayan Mummy | —N/a | Director, producer, cinematographer |
| 1965 | Curse of the Stone Hand | —N/a | Director, producer, editor |
| 1965 | Face of the Screaming Werewolf | —N/a | Writer, director, producer, editor |
| 1965 | Creature of the Walking Dead | —N/a | Writer, director, producer, cinematographer |
| 1965 | House of the Black Death | —N/a | Hired to film additional scenes |
| 1966 | The Wild World of Batwoman | —N/a | Writer, director, producer, editor |
| 1981 | Frankenstein Island | —N/a | Writer, director, producer, music |

== Discography ==
Singles
| Act | Title | Catalogue | Year | Notes # |
|---|---|---|---|---|
| Jerry Warren with The Pets | "Monkey Walk" / "Street Of Love" | Arwin M-118 | 1959 | |
