= Frankenstein Island =

- Film poster
- Directed by: Jerry Warren
- Written by: Jacques Lecoutier
- Produced by: Jerry Warren; Robert Christopher
- Starring: John Carradine; Cameron Mitchell; Andrew Duggan; Steve Brodie; Robert Clarke; Katherine Victor
- Cinematography: Murray De Ately
- Edited by: Jerry Warren (uncredited)
- Music by: Jerry Warren
- Production companies: Cerito Films; Chriswar
- Distributed by: Intercontinental
- Release date: November 27, 1981
- Running time: 97 minutes
- Country: United States
- Language: English

Frankenstein Island is a 1981 science fiction horror film produced, written, composed, edited and directed by Jerry Warren and starring John Carradine and Cameron Mitchell. The plot concerns a group of balloonists stranded on an island where they are captured by Dr. Frankenstein's female descendant, Sheila Frankenstein, who has been kidnapping shipwrecked sailors for years and turning them into zombies.

== Plot ==
When a hot air balloon crashes on a remote and uncharted island, the four balloonists and their dog Melvin are captured by a pair of drunken old pirates who take them to the hilltop laboratory home of Dr. Frankenstein's modern-day descendant Sheila Frankenstein who is carrying on the family tradition by turning shipwrecked sailors into pre-programmed bloodless, black-garbed zombies who must wear sunglasses to protect their weird white eyes from light.

Discovering that one of the new arrivals is a doctor, the buxom, white-haired Sheila quickly brainwashes him into helping her try to save her bedridden 200-year-old husband Dr. Van Helsing using the blood of a Poe-quoting prisoner and the nubile bodies of a local tribe of primitive bikini-clad Amazon jungle girls descended from highly advanced aliens who once used the rocky, desolate island as their secret Earth landing site.

Meanwhile, the mystic spirit of her ancestor hovers ever near, channeling from the Great Beyond all of the arcane energies that charge her experiments as he rants about "The Power! The Power!!", while his immortal creation, the original Frankenstein Monster, lies trapped underwater at the bottom of a pool hidden in a cave, biding its time as it waits for its chance to escape.

== Cast ==
- John Carradine as Dr. Frankenstein
- Cameron Mitchell as Clay Jayson
- Katherine Victor as Sheila Frankenstein-Von Helsing
- Robert Clarke as Dr. Hadley
- Andrew Duggan as The Colonel
- Steve Brodie as Jocko
- Spanky Goodman as Plynth

== Production ==
In an interview with Tom Weaver, Jerry Warren stated that between making The Wild World of Batwoman in 1966 and making Frankenstein Island in 1981, he was living on his ranch for fifteen years, as he no longer had any interest in the film business. On meeting with Katherine Victor in 1981, Warren learned that low-budget horror films were profitable again and decided to make a new film even though he recalled he had not even seen any films in the past 15 years.

Warren wrote the screenplay and score himself under the alias of Jaques LaCatier and Erich Bromberg respectively. Frankenstein was generally the same story of his earlier film Teenage Zombies, with a connection to the titular legend added.

Warren cast a number of actors who had appeared in his previous work, including Robert Clarke, Katherine Victor and Steve Brodie. Clarke said he initially had high hopes for the film as he felt Warren "has a lot of enthusiasm and he can get a lot on the screen for the kind of money he spends. But it soon became pretty apparent that this wasn't going to get much beyond what any of his others had achieved, and it wouldn't reach Planet X or Time Barrier or even Sun Demon as far as quality."

== Release ==
An article on actor Jim Webb in the Los Angeles Times stated that Frankenstein Island would be released in the summer of 1981. The film was ultimately released that November.

Warren later felt he did not make Frankenstein Island modern enough to compete with contemporary films. He made a television version of the film which featured newer material that included scenes with explosions and special effects and cut out portions of the film. Clarke recalled that Warren "cut and cut it, but it's still very ponderous."

== Reception and legacy ==
From contemporary reviews, Jack Zink stated that Frankenstein Island was "abominable" stating that both John Carradine and Andrew Duggan "show their age dramatically enough to indicate the film stock isn't as must as the images imprinted on it" and that Warren was "a hack" and "among the '50s-era cheapie filmmakers, hasn't changed his tactics a bit." Zink concluded that "cultists may get a kick out of investigation to determine whether Frankenstein Island is terrible enough to rank among the worst films of all time. For the rest, this boring nonsense is an excruciating peek at just how low once-respectable marquee names can sink."

From retrospective reviews, academic Peter Dendle wrote in The Zombie Movie Encyclopedia, called it "a ludicrous mishmash of random elements, lovingly stirred into a burgoo of cinematic insanity".

In 1985, Warren discussed a sequel, which he described as "more up-to-date, not so campy and old-time." He suggested that co-writer Robert Christopher would co-direct. Warren died in 1988.

In 2012, former Mystery Science Theater 3000 writers Michael J. Nelson, Kevin Murphy and Bill Corbett recorded a comedic commentary via their RiffTrax subsidiary.
