= House of Terror (1960 film) =

La Casa del Terror
- Original Mexican theatrical release poster
- Directed by: Gilberto Martínez Solares
- Written by: Fernando de Fuentes; Juan García; Gilberto Martínez Solares
- Produced by: Fernando de Fuentes hijo
- Starring: Germán Valdés; Yolanda Varela
- Cinematography: Raúl Martínez Solares
- Edited by: Carlos Savage
- Music by: Luis Demetrio
- Release date: 1960
- Country: Mexico

La Casa del Terror (lit. 'House of Terror') is a 1960 Mexican horror comedy film written and directed by Gilberto Martínez Solares, and starring Germán Valdés "Tin-Tan", Yolanda Varela and Lon Chaney Jr..

The film revolves around Casimiro (Valdés), a night watchman in a wax museum, whose boss, Professor Sebastian (Yerye Beirute), has been secretly draining his blood to use in his experiments in resurrection. A mummy (Lon Chaney Jr.) who is stolen from an Egyptian sarcophagus is revived to life, and becomes a werewolf when moonlight hits him.

The film was made in Mexico in 1959, with Chaney traveling there to perform his role in the film. Segments of La Casa del Terror were years later combined with footage from a 1957 Mexican film, La Momia Azteca, to create a hybrid film called Face of the Screaming Werewolf by producer Jerry Warren.

== Plot ==
Casimiro, the night watchman at a wax museum of horrors, has been napping more frequently on the job because his boss, Professor Sebastian, is secretly draining blood from him while he sleeps to use in his experiments in resurrection, experiments conducted in his hidden laboratory behind the wax museum.

The mad doctor's attempts haven't worked so far, and the bodies of his failures have been covered in wax and placed in the museum to cover his crimes.

The professor learns that the mummified body of a man has been found preserved in an Egyptian sarcophagus. The professor and his two henchmen steal the body of the mummy and take it back to his lab - but after the mummy is unwrapped, they fail to revive him.

After the doctor and his men leave the lab that night, a bolt of lightning reactivates the equipment and provides the surge needed to revive the dead man. As he struggles to awareness, the clouds outside part, the full moon shines on his face through a window, and the resurrected corpse transforms into a werewolf.

Casimiro sees the creature wandering around the museum, but no one will believe him, not even his girlfriend, Paquita. When the professor and his men return, the werewolf kills one of his henchmen, and the Wolf Man is imprisoned in a cage inside the lab. He later escapes and lopes off to the nearest park, where he strangles and bites a few innocent people.

The werewolf winds up at Paquita's apartment, and Casimiro arrives there just in time to see his girlfriend being abducted. He bravely follows them back to the wax museum and after witnessing the werewolf brutally slay Professor Sebastian, Casimiro gets the jump on the werewolf and beats him to death with a burning torch. The museum and lab catch fire, and the werewolf's body is immolated in the flames.

== Cast ==
- Germán Valdés "Tin-Tan" as Casimiro
- Yolanda Varela as Paquita
- Lon Chaney Jr. as The Mummy/ Werewolf
- Yerye Beirute as the professor
- Raymond Gaylord
- Consuelo Guerrero de Luna
- Rafael Estrada
- Mario Sevilla
- Alfredo Wally Baron
- Dacia Gonzalez
- Jose Silva
- Jose Luis Aguirre

== Production ==
The film was shot in Mexico in 1959. It was directed by Gilberto Martínez Solares (who also plotted the story). Juan García and Fernando de Fuentes co-wrote the finished screenplay with Solares.

Lon Chaney Jr. traveled to Mexico in 1959 to star in this Tin-Tan horror comedy. Jerry Warren commented (in an interview with Tom Weaver) "He (Chaney) didn't like doing this kind of film. He didn't like being classified as a werewolf at all. ....He wanted to be Lon Chaney, not the sort of character whose face changed.....but in Hollywood, people do the things they have to do."

The werewolf transformation effects in the film were very similar to those in the Universal Wolf Man movies, with Chaney having to hold his face still while the slow dissolves turn him into a monster. The special effects were handled by Jorge Benavides.

Producer Jerry Warren bought the film and combined footage from La Casa del Terror with footage from another 1950s Mexican film, La Momia Azteca, in order to create a hybrid film which he released in 1965 as Face of the Screaming Werewolf. He edited out almost all of the Tin-Tan comedy footage from the picture, leaving mostly just the Lon Chaney-related horror footage, then combined that with sequences taken from La Momia Azteca, together with some new footage he filmed himself, the result being almost unwatchable.

== Home media ==
La Casa del Terror was released on DVD in 2007 by Laguna Films.
