= Michael Dyne =

American screenwriter

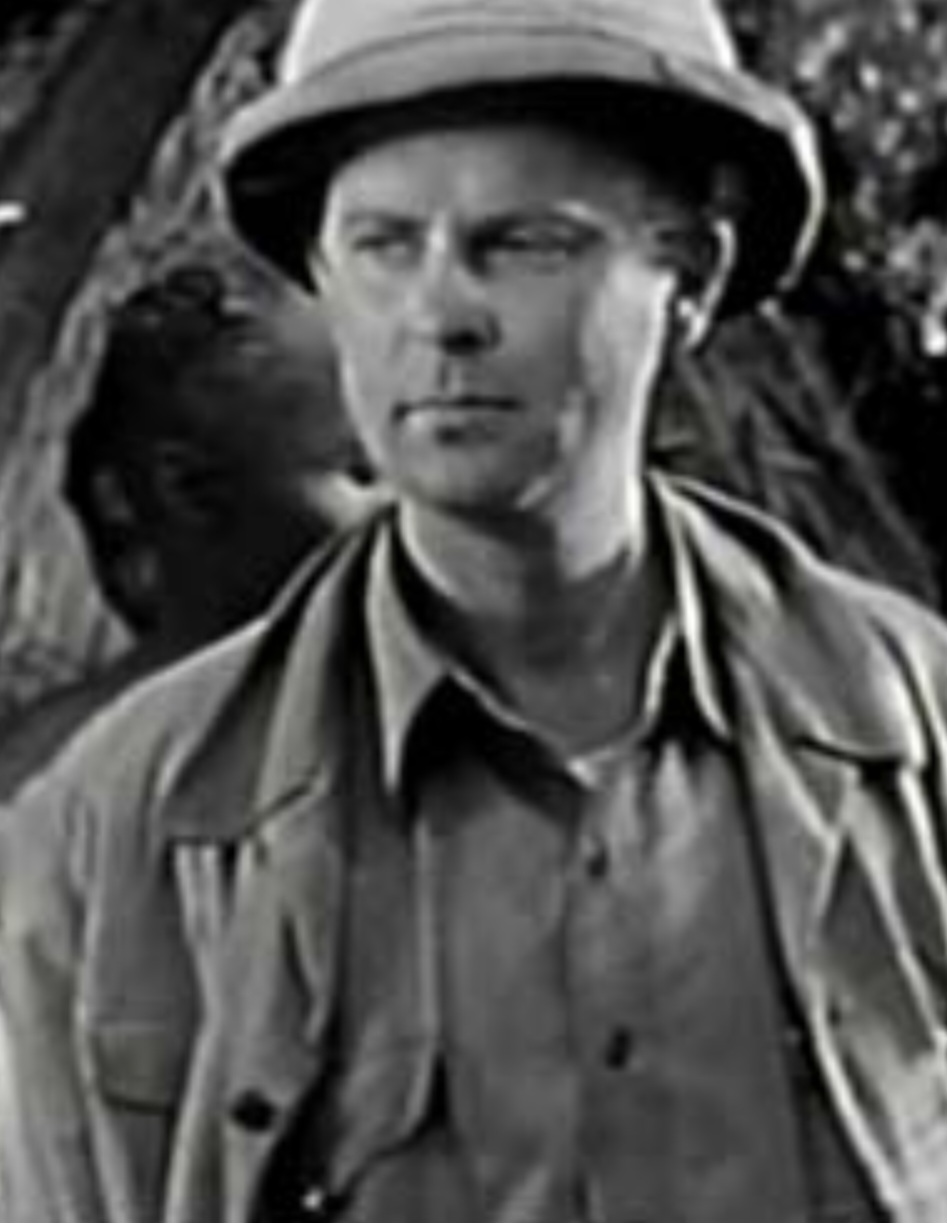
- Michael Dyne as Clive Carswell in the 1945 jungle potboiler White Pongo
- Born: Michael Bradley Dyne; September 19, 1918; London
- Died: May 17, 1989 (aged 70); Linlithgo, New York, U.S.
- Occupations: Screenwriter, actor
- Years active: 1943–1970

Michael Bradley Dyne (August 19, 1918 – May 17, 1989) was a British-American television and film screenwriter. He was also an actor, and wrote one stage play.

Dyne was the son of sculptor Musgrave Bradley Dyne. He was born in London, educated in France and Switzerland. He became a writer and actor in Canada, then emigrated to the United States in 1938.

Dyne played small parts in some Paramount and 20th Century-Fox films (such as the Prince of Wales in Kitty (1945)). He tried out for the title role in The Picture of Dorian Gray (1945) but lost out to Hurd Hatfield.

Starting in 1949, Dyne became a pioneering television writer, turning out 25 plays for Studio One and also writing scripts for The Alcoa Hour, Kraft Television Theatre, Playhouse 90, and other television shows. From 1952 to 1970, Dyne wrote more than 150 dramas for television, including adaptations of Henry James, Pirandello, and Thomas Hardy.

Dyne also wrote movie scripts for Walt Disney Studios, including The Moon-Spinners (1964). He wrote the 1964 play The Right Honourable Gentleman which ran for three years in the West End and was also produced on Broadway.

He died in 1989 in Linlithgo, New York.

== Filmography ==
Year	Title	Role	Notes
1943	The Purple V	Young British Officer	Uncredited
1943	Sahara	British Soldier	Uncredited
1945	Hangover Square	Mickey	Uncredited
1945	White Pongo	Clive Carswell	
1945	Kitty	Prince of Wales	
1946	Cluny Brown	John Frewen	Uncredited
1947	The Homestretch	Julian Scott	Uncredited
1947	The Imperfect Lady	Malcolm Gadby	
1947	Moss Rose	Asst. Hotel Manager	Uncredited, (final film role)
