= Creature of the Walking Dead =

- Directed by: Jerry Warren
- Written by: José María Fernández Unsáin (plot); Alfredo Varela Jr. (screenplay)
- Produced by: Alfredo Ripstein hijo Jerry Warren
- Starring: Rock Madison; Ann Wells; George Todd; Willard Gross; Bruno VeSota; Lloyd Nelson; Katherine Victor
- Cinematography: Enrique Wallace
- Edited by: Jorge Busto; Jerry Warren
- Music by: Gustavo César Carrión
- Production company: Jerry Warren Productions Inc.
- Distributed by: A.D.P. Pictures Inc.
- Release date: June 15, 1965
- Running time: 74 minutes
- Country: United States
- Language: English

Creature of the Walking Dead is a 1965 horror film re-edited by Jerry Warren from a 1961 Mexican horror film La Marca del Muerto, which translates as Mark of the Dead Man. The original Mexican film was directed by Fernando Cortés, written by Alfredo Varela Jr., and released in Mexico on October 12, 1961. The special effects was handled by Nicholas Reye.

== Plot ==
Dr. Malthus (Fernando Casanova), a 19th-century mad scientist, discovers the secret of eternal youth by means of transfusing the blood of young women into his subjects. He is hung for his crimes, but decades later, his grandson (who looks just like him) inherits his home and revives him from the dead. Malthus then resumes his rejuvenation activities using himself as the subject and enabled by his grandson, who procures healthy young victims they can bleed. Fernando Casanova played both the mad scientist Dr. Malthus and his grandson in a dual role.

== Cast ==
- Ann Wells
- George Todd
- Willard Gross
- Bruno VeSota as Police Inspector
- Lloyd Nelson
- Katherine Victor

plus cast members of the original Mexican film:

- Fernando Casanova as Dr. Malthus and his grandson (dual role)
- Aurora Alvarado
- Rosa María Gallardo
- Hortensia Santonena
- Pedro d'Aguillón
- Edmundo Espino
- Sonia Furio

== Production ==
Warren's contribution to the U.S. version of the film consisted of extensive editing, some dubbing of the Mexican players in select scenes, voice-over narration over most of the Mexican footage, and the inclusion of several brief scenes filmed by Warren in the United States with American actors. The Americanized version was released on June 15, 1965.

Warren wrote actor Bruno Ve Sota into the film as a police inspector receiving a shoulder massage in the added American footage, and added some scenes starring Katherine Victor as a fortune teller conducting a seance. Although a "Rock Madison" was given top billing in the credits, modern sources state that "Rock Madison" was just a fake name made up by Jerry Warren to make his casts seem larger.

== Reception ==
On his website Fantastic Movie Musings and Ramblings, Dave Sindelar gave the film a negative review, criticizing the film's dialogue, and poor editing which Sindelar felt ruined any build-up of drama and tension.

Fred Olen Ray said "Whenever the original Spanish cast members are called upon to speak, we are treated to a constant stream of voice-over narration, supplied by the grandson, who conveniently explains what they are saying....Bruno Ve Sota, receiving one of cinema's longest arm massages, rattles on incessantly....It is maddening."

== See also ==
- List of American films of 1965
