= Bob Curtis (actor) =

American actor

- Born: 23 September 1932; Washington, D.C., U.S.
- Died: 16 September 2004 (aged 71)
- Resting place: Holy Cross Cemetery
- Occupation(s): priest, actor
- Known for: Falcon Crest, Fatso

Bob Curtis (September 23, 1932 – November 16, 2004) was an American Catholic priest notable for working as an actor. Playing priests, he appeared in the comedy Fatso (1980) and the soap opera Falcon Crest (1982–1990).
