= Face of the Screaming Werewolf =

1965 film by Jerry Warren

- Directed by: Gilberto Martínez Solares; Rafael Portillo; Jerry Warren
- Written by: Fernando de Fuentes; Gilberto Martínez Solares; Alfredo Salazar; Jerry Warren
- Produced by: Jerry Warren
- Starring: Lon Chaney Jr. Yerye Beirute; George Mitchell; Fred Hoffman; Rosita Arenas; Ramón Gay
- Cinematography: Raúl Martínez Solares; Enrique Wallace
- Edited by: Jerry Warren
- Music by: Luis Hernández Bretón
- Distributed by: A.D.P. Pictures Inc. Something Weird Video
- Release date: March 3, 1965
- Running time: 60 minutes
- Countries: Mexico; United States
- Language: English (Dubbed)

Face of the Screaming Werewolf is a 1965 horror film directed by a low budget film maker Jerry Warren. The film was created by combining parts of two unrelated Mexican horror films, La Casa del Terror (1960), and La Momia Azteca (1957), with the addition of original footage shot by Warren. It was released on March 3, 1965, on a double-bill with another of Warren's films, Curse of the Stone Hand.

== The Re-edited Version ==
Warren had earlier released his own re-edited version of La Momia Azteca in 1963, which he had retitled Attack of the Mayan Mummy. He removed large sections of the original Mexican film and replaced them with newly filmed footage featuring American actors. He later used extensive footage from this same Mexican mummy film to incorporate into his Face of the Screaming Werewolf. Ed Wood is rumored to have filmed a few scenes of Lon Chaney Jr. in a werewolf costume in Hollywood in 1964, which Jerry Warren supposedly incorporated into Face of the Screaming Werewolf, but this story has never been verified.

== Plot ==
A psychic woman named Ann Taylor (Rosita Arenas), regressed to a former life via hypnosis, leads archaeologists into an Aztec pyramid where they discover a tomb containing two mummies, one of which turns out to be a mummified Caucasian werewolf (Lon Chaney Jr.), the other a mummified ancient Aztec warrior (Angel di Stefani). A mad doctor (Yerye Beirute) kidnaps the werewolf-mummy to his lab and manages to revive him, the unwrapped creature transforming into a snarling werewolf when the full moon rises.

Meanwhile, the second mummy (the Aztec warrior) escapes from captivity later that night. The mummy tries to kidnap Ann Taylor, the psychic, from her apartment. They are both anticlimactically hit by a car and killed (off-screen) as he tries to carry her off. A hastily inserted newspaper headline alerts the public that the mummy has been killed, bringing that plot to an abrupt end.

The werewolf kills the mad scientist, escapes from the lab and goes on a killing spree in a nearby city. Near the film's finale, the werewolf kidnaps a young woman (Yolanda Varela) from her apartment and Mexican comedian Tin-Tan (German Valdés) battles the monster on a high ledge. However, since almost all of his scenes had been edited out of the original Mexican film by Jerry Warren for this Americanized edition, his appearance at the climax makes no sense. The werewolf escapes back to the lab with the woman, but the lab catches on fire and the nameless hero (Tin-Tan) beats him to death with a burning torch. As the werewolf reverts to his human form in death, a pair of American actors playing policemen dismiss the idea that there was ever a werewolf at all.

== Cast ==
- Lon Chaney Jr. as The Mummified Werewolf
- Angel Di Stefani as The Aztec Mummy
- Rosita Arenas as Ann Taylor (the psychic)
- Yerye Beirute as Dr. Janning
- George Mitchell as Dr. Frederick Munson
- Fred Hoffman as Detective Hammond
- Ramón Gay (billed as Raymond Gaylord) as Dr. Edmund Redding
- Alfredo W. Barron (billed as Donald Barron) as Janning's heavyset henchman
- Yolanda Varela (billed as Landa Varle) as the girl carried off by the werewolf
- German Valdés (aka Tin-Tan) as Hero who rescues the girl from the werewolf
- Chuck Niles as newscaster Douglas Banks
- Steve Conte as The Hired Thief
- Crox Alvarado as Redding's bespectacled aide

== Reception ==
Michael Weldon of Psychotronic Video stated that the film did not make sense since so much of the original dialogue scenes had been removed. Cavett Binion of AllMovie referred to it as a "messy film" that contained poor dubbing and editing.
