= Gunfire (film) =

1950 film

- Directed by: William Berke
- Screenplay by: Victor West; William Berke
- Produced by: William Berke; Jack Leewood
- Starring: Don Barry; Robert Lowery; Pamela Blake
- Cinematography: Ernest Miller
- Edited by: Carl Pierson
- Music by: Albert Glasser
- Production company: Donald Barry Productions
- Distributed by: Lippert Pictures; Exclusive Films (UK)
- Release date: August 11, 1950
- Running time: 59 minutes
- Country: United States
- Language: English

Gunfire (also known as Frank James Rides Again) is a 1950 American Western film directed by William Berke and starring Don Barry, Robert Lowery and Pamela Blake.

== Plot ==
Frank James' plans for a quiet life are threatened by the arrival of a lookalike.

== Cast ==
- Don Barry as Frank James
- Robert Lowery as Sheriff John Kelly
- Wally Vernon as Clem
- Pamela Blake as Cynthy
- Claude Stroud as Joe Mundy
- Leonard Penn as Dan Simons
- Steve Pendleton as Charlie Ford
- Tommy Farrell as Lerner
- Dean Riesner as Outlaw Mack
- Paul Jordan as Johnny James
- Steve Conte as Matt Riley
- Roger Anderson as Bob Ford
- Gilbert Fallman as Bank President
- Kathleen Magginetti as Amy James
- William Bailey as Second Sheriff
- Jan Sterling as Flo - Saloon Girl
- Barbara Wooddell as Emily James
