= Code of the West (1947 film) =

1947 film by William A. Berke

- Theatrical release poster
- Directed by: William Berke
- Screenplay by: Norman Houston
- Based on: Code of the West by Zane Grey
- Produced by: Herman Schlom
- Starring: James Warren; Debra Alden; John Laurenz
- Cinematography: Jack MacKenzie
- Edited by: Ernie Leadlay
- Music by: Paul Sawtell
- Production company: RKO Radio Pictures
- Distributed by: RKO Radio Pictures
- Release date: February 20, 1947 (USA)
- Running time: 57 minutes
- Country: United States
- Language: English

Code of the West is a 1947 American Western film directed by William Berke and starring James Warren, Debra Alden, Steve Brodie and Robert Clarke. Written by Norman Houston, it is based on the 1934 novel of the same name by Zane Grey.

== Plot ==
Two cowboys come to the aid of a rancher whose land is being threatened by an unscrupulous businessman.

== Cast ==
- James Warren as Bob Wade
- Debra Alden as Ruth Stockton
- John Laurenz as Chito Rafferty
- Steve Brodie as Henchman Steve Saunders
- Rita Lynn as Pepita
- Robert Clarke as Harry Stockton
- Harry Woods as Marshal Nate Hatfield
- Carol Forman as Milly Saunders
- Raymond Burr as Boyd Carter
- Harry Harvey as Banker Henry Stockton
- Phil Warren as Henchman Wes
- Emmet Lynn as Doc Quinn
