= Fatso (1980 film) =

1980 film by Anne Bancroft

- Theatrical release poster
- Directed by: Anne Bancroft
- Written by: Anne Bancroft
- Produced by: Stuart Cornfeld
- Starring: Candice Azzara; Anne Bancroft; Ron Carey; Dom DeLuise
- Cinematography: Brianne Murphy
- Edited by: Glenn Farr
- Music by: Joe Renzetti
- Production company: Brooksfilms
- Distributed by: 20th Century Fox
- Release date: February 1, 1980
- Running time: 93 minutes
- Country: United States
- Language: English
- Box office: $8.7 million

Fatso is a 1980 American comedy-drama film written and directed by Anne Bancroft, her only such credit, and starring Dom DeLuise, Ron Carey and Candice Azzara. The film examines the subject matter of obesity, addiction, family, self-acceptance, and singlehood. It is also noteworthy for Brianne Murphy becoming the first woman to be credited as a cinematographer on a studio film.

Fatso was released on February 2, 1980, and it received mixed reviews by the critics.

== Plot ==
As the DiNapoli siblings – Antoinette, Dominic, and Frank Jr. – are growing up, whenever young Dom was unhappy, the one thing his mother did to comfort him and make him feel cared for was to feed him something scrumptious. For example, Dom's mom would soothe her older son by giving him a piece of buttered Italian bread when infant brother Frank Junior urinates on the boy during a diaper change. Because of this, Dom grew up with a love of food, a trait shared by his equally obese cousin, Sal. After Sal regularly shares his snacks with Dom, he associates food with human interaction.

When Sal suddenly dies at age 39, the family grieves. This prompts Antoinette to urge Dom to visit a diet doctor to avoid his cousin's unhealthy eating habits and not drive himself into an early grave as well. Dom agrees to do so once he recognizes signs that obesity is ruining his health. He is deeply disheartened when given his new diet plan, seeing the long list of foods that he now must avoid. When the diet fails, Dom's eating habits drive his sister crazy, so she enrolls him in the "Chubby Checkers" support group.

Meanwhile, Dom meets Lydia, a thin diabetic who owns the neighborhood antiques shop, and finds they have a lot in common outside of food. But being self-conscious about his body contours, he fears rejection and can't bring himself to ask her for a date despite her obvious interest in him.

Dom had Frankie padlock the fridge and larder, but that proves to be little help because in the middle of the night, Dom, crazed by cravings, demands the keys from his brother, even threatening him with violence.

Now further depressed, Dom seeks comfort from his support group Chubby Checkers – calling Sonny and Oscar – who turn out to be no help, as their reminiscing about favorite desserts and delicacies causes the intervention to deteriorate into a pig-out party.

To help their brother, Antoinette and Frankie bring together Dom and Lydia. While dating, Dom doesn't realize that he has been eating less and is shocked to discover how loosely his clothes fit in a matter of weeks.

Dom decides to propose to his sweetheart. When he drops by Lydia's apartment, she is gone. It worries him so much, he ends up eating all of the Chinese takeout food he was supposed to pick up for a family party. Antoinette finds out and attacks Dom with a doll mounted on a stick and comments how he's hurting the family. Dom admits his acknowledgement of this and blames his mother for comforting him with food all his life. Antoinette learns this for the first time and comforts him after a mental breakdown while he curses his mother. Dom promises to keep trying. However, he also realizes that he must love himself the way he is and makes his siblings promise to do the same, after which Antoinette and Frank learn to accept Dom for who he is. Dom then receives a phone call from Lydia, who is at a hospital in Boston visiting her younger brother, who accidentally chopped off a finger. Dom flies in and when the two take a walk through the hospital, watching the newborn babies in the nursery, Dom whispers his marriage proposal into Lydia's ear, and she accepts.

The film's end credits show a photo montage of the now-married Dom and Lydia with their children, each photo showing Lydia holding a new baby, while the previous child grows up. Dom's obesity fluctuates over the years with him looking the most miserable at his heaviest but it clearly exacts no toll upon the family's happiness.

== Cast ==
- Candice Azzara as Lydia Bollowenski
- Anne Bancroft as Antoinette Sosonna (née DiNapoli)
- Ron Carey as Frank "Frankie" DiNapoli, Jr.
- David Comfort as Anthony Sosonna
- Father Bob Curtis as Father Monohan
- Dom DeLuise as Dominic Anthony "Dom" DiNapoli
- Richard Karron as Sonny "Big Guy" Loffolotto
- Michael Lombard as Charlie Sosonna
- Ralph Manza as Danny
- Peggy Mondo as Tessie
- Estelle Reiner as Mrs. Goodman
- Natasha Ryan as Ann Marie Sosonna
- Sal Viscuso as Vito (Dom's cousin)
- Paul Zegler as Oscar "Jew" Lapidus

== Production ==
The film was announced in February 1979, with Anne Bancroft set to make her directorial debut (making her just one of ten working women directors at the time). The film is also noteworthy for Brianne Murphy becoming the first female cinematographer of a theatrically-released studio film. It was also the first film produced by Brooksfilms, the production company run by Bancroft's husband, Mel Brooks.

Filming took place for seven weeks in Los Angeles, beginning that April, before moving to New York City and completing photography on May 29.

== Critical reception ==
The film has a rating of 29% on Rotten Tomatoes based on seven reviews.

Many critics were very surprised by the effectively dramatic performances from actors who had mostly been limited to satiric or sophomoric comedy films in the past. Critic Peter Wu described the film as "A very humorous and yet serious movie about obesity," going on to write: "Maybe being overweight isn't the best thing for a person's health, but being one's self and being happy is all that really matters in life ... With a delightful blend of New York Italian culture and the human problem of overeating, Fatso makes for an entertaining movie experience. Loaded with some of the funniest comedy gags I have ever seen, Fatso is a very humorous and yet serious movie about a very touchy subject, Dom DeLuise!"

Other critics, such as Gene Siskel and Roger Ebert, were not as kind. Siskel called it "[an] emaciated script idea", "a major disappointment for Bancroft, who is making her directorial debut [and] an even bigger disappointment for this critic, who has been arguing for years that DeLuise is a gifted actor capable of playing leading roles." Ebert remarked that "two basic dramatic approaches to fatness are to regard it as comic, or tragic. Anne Bancroft has somehow avoided both approaches in 'Fatso,' a movie with the unique distinction of creating in its audiences an almost constant suspense about how they're supposed to be reacting. The movie itself just doesn't know: 'Fatso' has a director, a screenplay and a cast who are all uncertain about how they really feel about overweight." Another critical point of view said succinctly, "the biggest weight problem in the movie was the heavy hand of director Bancroft."

== Impact ==
This film was also reviewed in the psychiatric monograph The Eating Disorders, which concluded that the film "... veers between comedy and pathos as a man discovers ... fat is the ... only sin in America." They approvingly note that, "The motivation for overeating and binge dieting are lampooned ... [and] medical consequences ... are elaborated in ... comedic fashion."

The film marked a turning point in the lives of actors Richard Karron and Paul Zegler who played DeLuise's obese "Chubby Checker" support group members. Both actors lost large amounts of weight in the years subsequent to the making of the film.
