= Invasion of the Animal People =

1959 science fiction film directed by Virgil W. Vogel

- Swedish theatrical poster
- Directed by: Virgil W. Vogel
- Written by: Arthur C. Pierce (screenplay and story)
- Produced by: Bertil Jernberg; Gustaf Unger
- Starring: Barbara Wilson; Stan Gester; Robert Burton; John Carradine
- Cinematography: Hilding Bladh
- Edited by: Shirley Citron; Tom Rolf
- Music by: Harry Arnold; Allan Johansson
- Release dates: 19 August 1959 (Sweden); 3 May 1962 (U.S.)
- Running time: 73 minutes
- Countries: United States; Sweden
- Languages: English; Swedish

Invasion of the Animal People (Swedish: Rymdinvasion i Lappland, lit. 'Space invasion in Lapland') is a 1959 Swedish-American black-and-white science fiction-monster film released to Swedish cinemas on August 19, 1959. The film was produced by Bertil Jernberg and Gustaf Unger, directed by American Virgil W. Vogel, and stars Barbara Wilson, Robert Burton, and Stan Gester. Written by Arthur C. Pierce, the film had most of its dialogue in English.

The film was re-edited by American producer Jerry Warren and had newly filmed sequences added. The film had its U.S. release in 1962 under the title Invasion of the Animal People

== Plot ==
While traveling in Sweden, Olympic skater Diane Wilson meets up with her uncle, famous geologist Dr. Vance Wilson (Robert Burton), who has come there to help investigate the recent landing of what appears to be a large meteorite. Diane is courted by her uncle's associate, Dr. Erik Engstrom (Sten Gester), though she aggressively plays hard-to-get while they are skiing, at one point grabbing his skis and leaving him to walk back all the way to the hotel. A romance slowly begins, and eventually they are interrupted by the news of a large herd of mutilated reindeer in Lapland. Both scientists immediately fly there, far north in the Arctic mountains of Lapland, near the site of the meteorite crash. To the irritation of both scientists, they discover Diane has stowed away aboard their aircraft. When they arrive, the meteorite is actually determined to be a round alien spaceship, and she suddenly realizes just how dangerous a decision she has made.

An enormously tall, hairy biped creature, with powerful jaws, tusks, and large round feet, under the control of three humanoid aliens in the spaceship, comes out of nowhere and begins menacing the scientists and the native Laplanders. The tall beast destroys the scientists' aircraft, killing the soldier guarding it, and begins tearing apart Laplander houses with its bare hands. As Dr. Engstrom and Diane are trying to ski away to safety, the hairy monster attacks again and is able to capture Diane. She screams and faints.

Meanwhile, a search party has been formed, now carrying torches as night begins to fall. They hear Diane's screams and go toward the sound. Dr. Engstrom arrives and watches as the hairy monster carries her off. He hurries toward the torch-carrying Laplanders and tries to alert Dr. Wilson, who is with them, that the creature now has Diane. Carrying her to the snow-buried alien spaceship, the extraterrestrial monster suddenly begins displaying tenderness toward his captive, a result of mind control exerted over the creature by the humanoid aliens. She runs into an adjoining ice cave and screams and faints again when the aliens come near. The aliens leave the cave and see the mass of lighted torches coming their way. The hairy monster picks up Diane and heads away from the buried spaceship.

The Laplanders give chase and are finally able to confront the huge creature, who is now standing with its back to the edge of a deep snow cliff. Angry villagers begin throwing their fire torches, and the tall monster carefully places Diane on the ground, where she is able to roll several feet away. More torches are thrown and the hairy creature catches on fire, falling backward fully engulfed over the cliff to a fiery death down below. The aliens take off in their spaceship, returning the very way they came. Diane and Erik walk off into the midnight sun together.

== Cast ==
- Barbara Wilson as Diane Wilson
- Sten Gester as Erik Engström
- Robert Burton as Dr. Frederick Wilson
- Bengt Blomgren as Col. Robert Bottiger
- Åke Grönberg as Dr. Henrik
- Gösta Prüzelius as Dr. Walter Ullman
- Doreen Denning as Anna, Dr. Ullmans secretary
- Ittla Frodi as girl in the sports car
- Brita Borg as the singer
- Lars Åhrén as the monster
- John Carradine as the narrator (US version only)

== U.S. release ==
According to Swedish producer Bertil Jernberg, his partner co-producer Gustaf Unger was entrusted to act as their American agent. After telling Jernberg that "Paramount is going to buy it", Unger promptly sold the film to American producer Jerry Warren and kept all of the money he received from the transaction for himself.

For its U.S. theatrical release on May 3, 1962, the 73 minute Swedish cut of the film was shortened by distributor Jerry Warren to 55 minutes. Warren gave the film an entirely new beginning, adding an on-screen narrator (John Carradine), who opens and closes the film, bookending its revised storyline. New footage, set in the United States, was also shot with star Barbara Wilson for her "Diane Wilson" character that involved an earlier, traumatic UFO incident that was not in the original Swedish version. Another new scene, set in Sweden, has Wilson's character receiving a lengthy phone call. Additional scenes were also added of two ham radio operators in a wilderness Lapp cabin trying to communicate by shortwave radio with the outside world. Both characters never turn up again in the story. After other Swedish plot details were re-edited or cut entirely from the original (including a nude shower scene featuring Barbara Wilson), this new version was distributed in United States under Jerry Warren's title Invasion of the Animal People. It appeared as a 1962 double feature with Warren's original feature Terror of the Bloodhunters.

When Invasion of the Animal People went into U.S. television syndication, some extra footage was added, increasing the film's running time to 80 minutes (Warren's theatrical release cut was apparently too short for television syndication). The extra footage involved a group of doctors sitting in an office discussing the Diane Wilson character's various psychiatric problems. It was released to American television in 1959 as Terror in the Midnight Sun.)

=== Added prologue ===
The U.S. cut of the film opens with narration by John Carradine, informing the audience why scientific knowledge is necessary and a good thing. The scene switches to two doctors discussing the strange case of a patient named Diane Wilson (Barbara Wilson). A third doctor comes into the office holding a skull and proceeds to lecture the other two on how the human ear functions.

A flashback sequence begins by showing the audience Diane Wilson's earlier UFO incident: While asleep in her bed, the young woman experiences an extraterrestrial visit, awakening to a horrible, ear-splitting sound that only she can hear. Overcome by confusion, panic, and pain, she runs outside in her nightgown and sees a weird round light in the sky. By the time paramedics arrive and take her to the hospital, she is in a catatonic state and no longer able to explain what she has experienced. Local newspaper headlines wonder if what happened has something to do with a reported UFO sighting in the same area that night. Before this can be determined, she recovers completely, leaves the hospital, and flies to Sweden. At this point, the storyline of the original film begins, but with expository narration by Carradine added over various scenes throughout the rest of the film.

== Soundtrack ==
The Swedish film's original ballad, "Midnight Sun Lament", is based on the old Swedish folk melody popularized as "Värmlandsvisan" and had music and Swedish lyrics written by Gustaf Unger, and English lyrics by Frederick Herbert.

== Critical response ==
Film critic Glenn Erickson wrote in DVD Savant that the film was a "dismal, abysmal turkey," that "it doesn't provide much in the way of entertainment," that "neither of the leads quite cut it, although they are likeable enough," and that "the story heads exactly nowhere." Writing in AllMovie, critic Fred Beltin described the film as "thick with ponderous double talk that never advances the story and usually confuses it," but noted that "while the original Swedish film isn't terribly remarkable beyond its unique geographic setting, when compared to the muddled jumble that [American Producer Jerry] Warren concocted, it shines far brighter than it would on its own."

== Home media ==
A Special Edition DVD of the original 1959 Swedish theatrical release, under the film's international title Terror in the Midnight Sun, was released by Something Weird Video on July 10, 2001. The DVD also includes Jerry Warren's heavily re-edited 1962 US release, Invasion of the Animal People, and a selection of short Swedish films and Swedish movie trailers from the same period, rounding out the package.

== Controversy ==
After the filming concluded, the director asked Barbara Wilson's stand-in to do a nude shower scene that would later be added to the reel. This wasn't in the script and Barbara wasn't notified about it until after returning to the United States. Hertz-Lion Pictures refused to remove the footage, so she sued them for $150,000. She later dropped the lawsuit.

== Bibliography ==
- Warren, Bill. Keep Watching the Skies! American Science Fiction Movies of the Fifties, (films released through 1962), 21st Century Edition. A large expanded single volume with new material added, Jefferson, North Carolina, McFarland & Company, 2009 (first published by McFarland as two volumes, 1982 and 1986). ISBN 0-89950-032-3.
