= Teenage Zombies =

1959 film by Jerry Warren

- Promotional poster
- Directed by: Jerry Warren
- Written by: Jacques Lecoutier
- Produced by: Jerry Warren
- Starring: Katherine Victor; Don Sullivan; Chuck Niles; Brianne Murphy
- Cinematography: Allen Chandler
- Edited by: Jerry Warren
- Distributed by: Governor Films Inc.
- Release date: November 1959
- Running time: 73 minutes
- Country: United States
- Language: English

Teenage Zombies is a 1959 American science fiction horror film written, produced, edited and directed by Jerry Warren, and starring Katherine Victor, Don Sullivan, Chuck Niles and Warren's then-wife and production manager Brianne Murphy. Warren wrote the screenplay under his pen name Jacques Lecoutier (which he frequently misspelled in the credits). Film historian Bill Warren wrote "This dreadful, leaden and depressingly cheap film does have one unusual aspect... it was actually made by Jerry Warren in its entirety."

The plot follows a group of teenagers who are marooned on an island inhabited by a female mad scientist, her pet gorilla and a zombie slave named Ivan. She traps the youths in a cage down in her laboratory, plotting to use them as subjects for her zombie-making experimentation, so she can test out a drug she is working on for an unnamed foreign nation.

Although the credits include a 1957 copyright statement for G.B.M. Productions, the film was never registered for copyright, rendering it in the public domain. It was only released theatrically on November 22, 1959, on a double bill with The Incredible Petrified World.

== Plot ==
While taking their boat out for some water-skiing, a quartet of teens named Reg, Skip, Julie, and Pam accidentally discover an island run by a mad scientist named Doctor Myra who, backed by foreign agents from "the East", intends to turn everyone in the United States into mindlessly obedient zombies.

The teenagers are captured by the hulking, bearded zombie Ivan and imprisoned in cages down in Myra's basement, but the boys manage to escape, planning to find a way off the island and then come back to rescue the girls. When a couple of their young friends arrive with the local sheriff to save them, he turns out to be in league with Myra and has been supplying her with victims for her experiments.

A complicated fight scene serves as the climax, in which a previously zombified gorilla arrives just in time to attack Myra's henchmen and allow the teens to escape. They find Myra attempting to steal their boat and manage to capture her for the police. After they are safely back on the mainland and the proper authorities informed, it is implied that the teens will receive a reward for discovering the island and will have an audience with the President of the United States.

== Cast ==
- Don Sullivan as Reg
- Katherine Victor as Dr. Myra
- Steve Conte as Whorf
- Brianne Murphy (Bri in the credits) as Pam
- Mitch Evans (aka Evan Hayworth) as the gorilla
- Chuck Niles as Ivan the zombie
- Paul Pepper as Skip
- J.L.D. Morrison as Brandt
- Mitzie Albertson as Julie
- Jay Hawk as Morrie
- Mike Concannon as Sheriff
- Nan Green as Dotty
- Don Neeley as Major Coleman

== Production ==
Actress Katharine Victor said Jerry Warren "discovered" her when they met by chance as he was preparing Teenage Zombies in mid-1957. She was surprised that he gave her almost no directorial help while they were making the film. Evan Hayworth (listed in the cast as Mitch Evans) said he played the gorilla wearing a cheap rental costume.

L.A. disc jockey Chuck Niles later said "I was just walking around like Frankenstein, that's all, no lines, just 'gluergugluergu,' and I'm pretty good at that ... the movie was just terrible". Lead actor Don Sullivan also appeared in two other 1950's cult films, The Giant Gila Monster and The Monster of Piedras Blancas.

The film's poster promised "Young Pawns Thrust into Pulsating Cages of Horror in a Sadistic Experiment", but Bill Warren wrote "It's doubtful anyone expected much more than the dreck they got ... .it's not just bad, it's terrible".

== Release ==
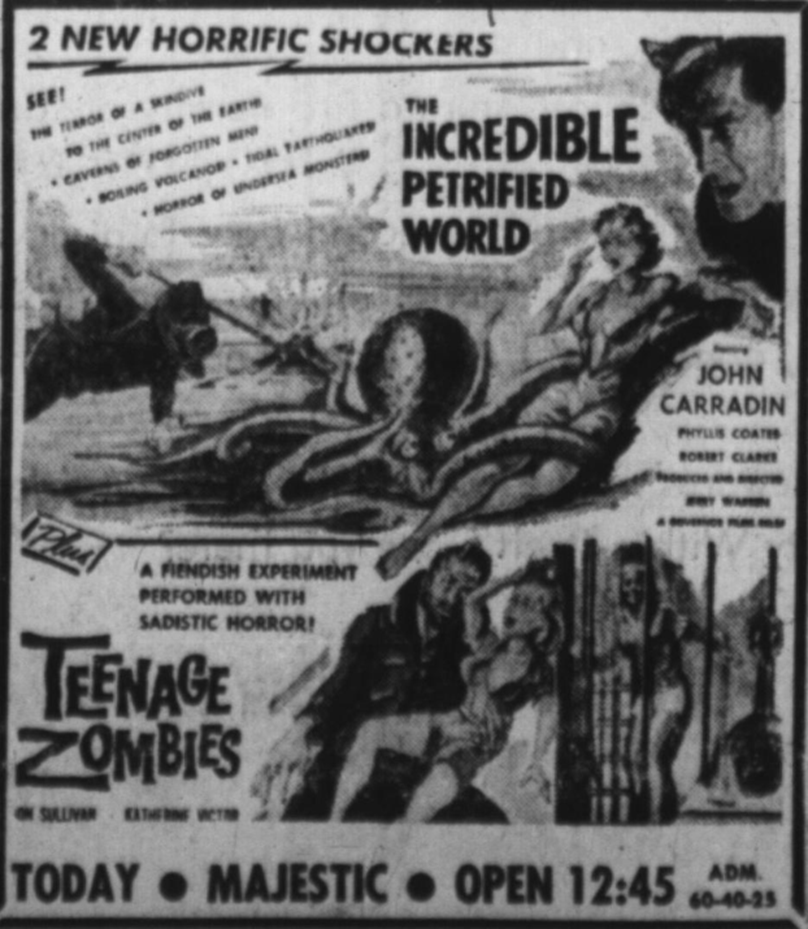
Advertisement from November 22, 1959 for Teenage Zombies and co-feature, The Incredible Petrified World

An ad from the Majestic Theatre in Abilene, Tx. states Teenage Zombies was released on a double feature with The Incredible Petrified World on November 22, 1959. A South Carolina theatre ad also confirms that date.

Bill Warren in his book Keep Watching the Skies states that the films were first released as a double feature in April 1960 in Los Angeles, which is obviously incorrect. The American Film Institute also states that the films were first released in April 1960 (also obviously incorrect).

== Critical response ==
The Monthly Film Bulletin wrote: "Juvenile in every sense, this is a crude horror comic, amusing only in the closing scenes, which are reminiscent in style of pre-war serials."

Picturegoer wrote: "The young players work hard on an extravagant script, but, inevitably, fail to achieve the impossible and make sense from nonsense."

Critic George Reis wrote that it "is often considered one of the worst horror films ever made," that the "claustrophobic sets [...] all look like they were shot in someone's house" and "the acting is appalling," but noted that "bad movie lovers will find something fascinating enough to induce repeated viewings; all others will just deem it junk."

Critic Nathaniel Thompson wrote that "the junky charms of this film are plentiful as it reels out pages and pages of ridiculous 'gee, whiz!' dialogue, a clunky soundtrack cobbled together with stock music from other '50s sci-fi films, and some juicy overacting" and that the film features "'minimalist' sets that would get thrown out of most high school plays," nevertheless concluding that "this one's a keeper."
