= Steve Brodie (actor) =

American actor (1919–1992)

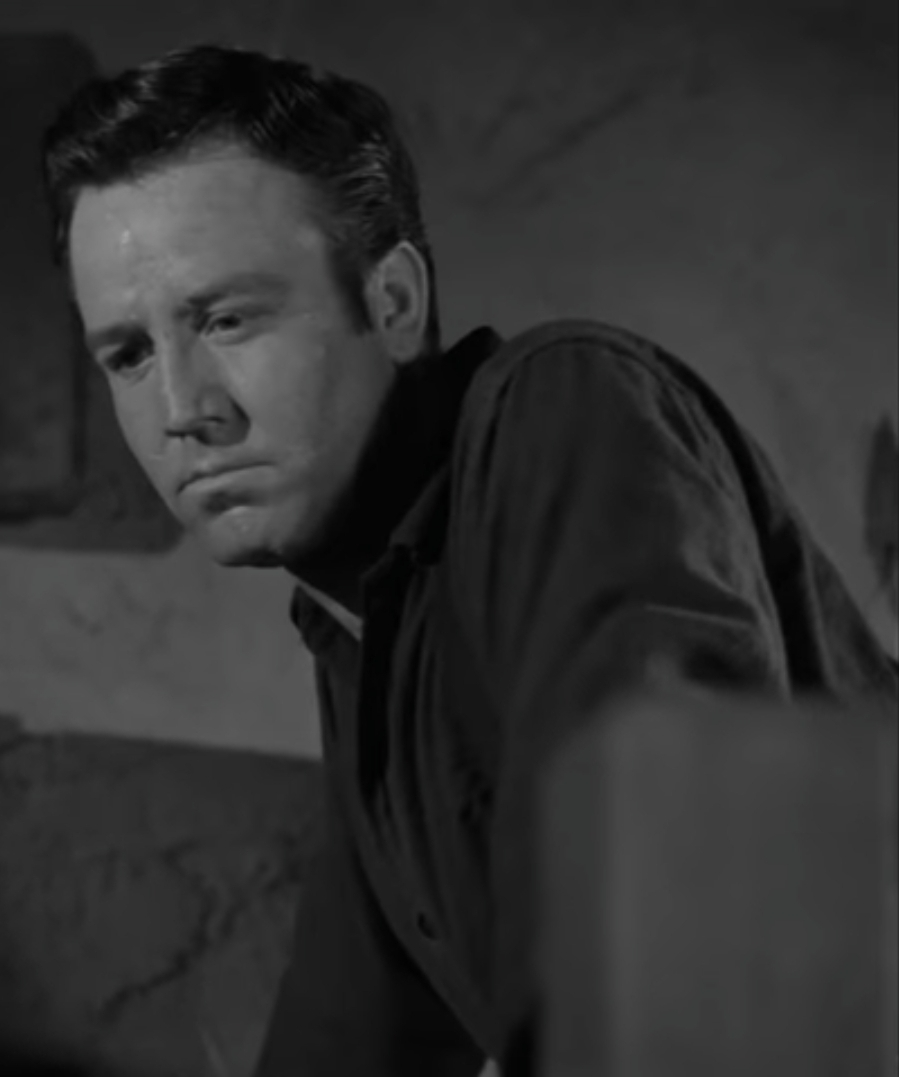
- Brodie in Only the Valiant (1951)
- Born: John Daugherty Stephens; November 21, 1919; El Dorado, Kansas, U.S.
- Died: January 9, 1992 (aged 72); Los Angeles, California, U.S.
- Occupation: Actor
- Years active: 1944–1989
- Spouses: Lois Andrews (m. 1946; div. 1948) Barbara Ann Savitt (m. 1950)
- Children: Kevin Brodie; Sean Brodie

Steve Brodie (born John Daugherty Stephens; November 21, 1919 – January 9, 1992) was an American stage, film, and television actor from El Dorado in Butler County in south central Kansas. He reportedly adopted his screen name in memory of Steve Brodie, a daredevil who claimed to have jumped from the Brooklyn Bridge in 1886 and survived.

== Career ==
Brodie appeared in 79 feature films during his career (1944-1988), plus a profusion of appearances on episodic TV. He worked at various studios, including MGM, RKO and Republic Pictures, appearing mostly in Westerns and B-movies. He played supporting roles in the majority of his films, including the 1947 film noir classic Out of the Past and 1950's Armored Car Robbery. An exception was 1947's Desperate, where he had a starring role. Later appearances included roles in two Elvis Presley films: 1961's Blue Hawaii and 1964's Roustabout.

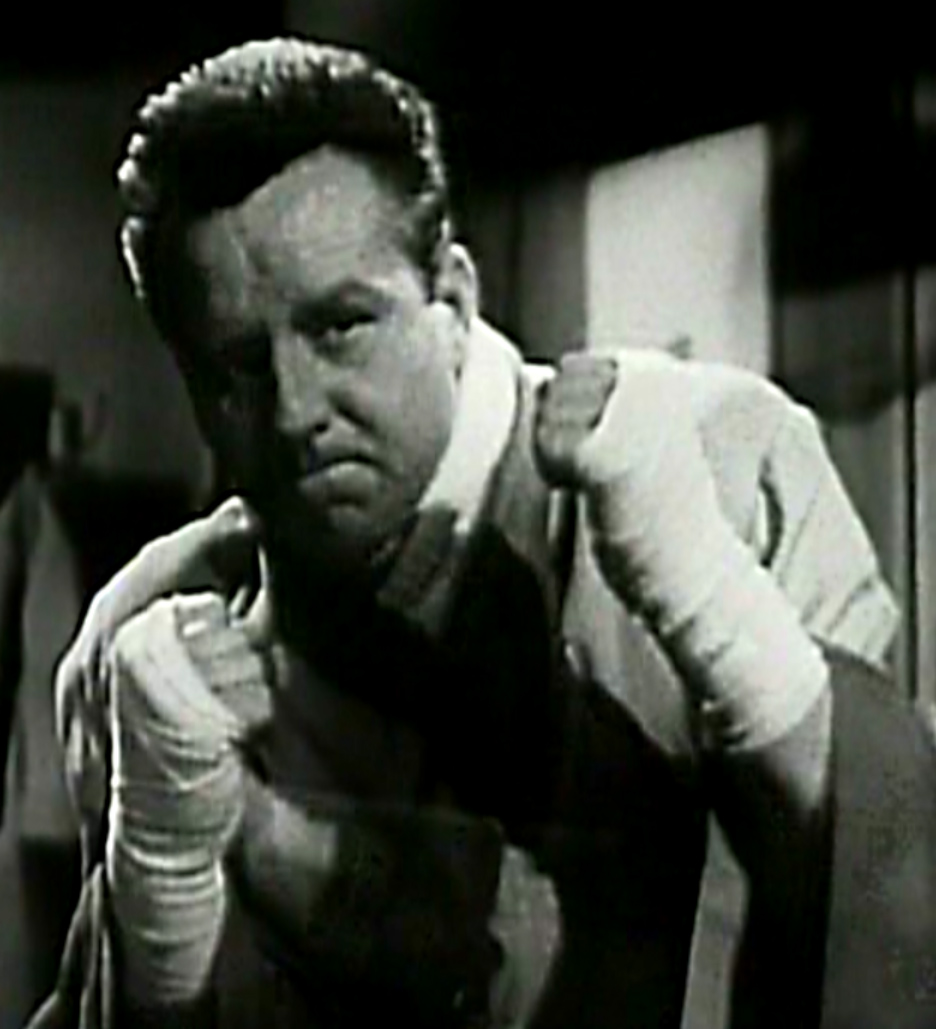
Brodie portraying boxer Mike O'Halloran in the comedy film The Admiral Was a Lady (1950)

Beginning in the mid 1950s, he appeared mostly on television, with guest-starring roles in such series as Stories of the Century (as the outlaw Harry Tracy), Crossroads, Sugarfoot, Colt .45, Cheyenne, Stagecoach West, Richard Diamond, Private Detective, Public Defender, Alfred Hitchcock Presents, The Alaskans, Pony Express, The Brothers Brannagan, Going My Way, The Asphalt Jungle, Wanted: Dead or Alive, and The Dakotas. Brodie made three guest appearances on Perry Mason. He portrayed Ben Wallace in the 1959 episode 'The Case of the Garrulous Gambler', Eddie Lewis in the 1962 episode 'The Case of the Angry Astronaut' and Quinn Torrey in the 1964 episode 'The Case of the Witless Witness'.

Brodie and Lash La Rue appeared nine and five times, respectively, as Sheriff Johnny Behan of Cochise County, Arizona, an historical person, in the ABC Western series, The Life and Legend of Wyatt Earp, starring Hugh O'Brian as Wyatt Earp.

Brodie appeared on stage in the 1950s as Maryk in a national company production of The Caine Mutiny Court-Martial, co-starring with Paul Douglas as Queeg and Wendell Corey as Greenwald.

== Personal life ==
Brodie was married to actress Lois Andrews from 1946 to 1948. He married Barbara Ann Savitt in 1950. Their son, Kevin Brodie, was a child actor who later became a film producer, director, and screenwriter.

== Death ==
Steve Brodie in 1992, at age 72, died of cancer in Canoga Park, Los Angeles. In his obituary in The Los Angeles Times, the newspaper erroneously states that Brodie had been nominated for an Academy Award as Best Supporting Actor for 1949's Home of the Brave. Actually, the actor was not among the five nominees in that category that year.

== Partial filmography ==
=== 1940s ===
- Ladies Courageous (1944) as Tower Man (uncredited)
- Follow the Boys (1944) as Australian Pilot (uncredited)
- Thirty Seconds Over Tokyo (1944) as Military Police Corporal (uncredited)
- This Man's Navy (1945) as Timothy Joseph Aloysius 'Tim' Shannon
- The Clock (1945) as Sergeant (uncredited)
- It's in the Bag! (1945) as Usher (uncredited)
- Anchors Aweigh (1945) as Soldier (uncredited)
- The Crimson Canary (1945) as Hillary
- A Walk in the Sun (1945) as Private Judson
- Young Widow (1946) as Willie Murphy
- Badman's Territory (1946) as Bob Dalton
- Sunset Pass (1946) as Cashier Slagle
- Criminal Court (1946) as Frankie Wright - Vic's Brother
- The Falcon's Adventure (1946) as Benny
- Trail Street (1947) as Logan Maury
- Code of the West (1947) as Henchman Matt Saunders
- Thunder Mountain (1947) as Chick Jorth
- Desperate (1947) as Steve Randall
- Crossfire (1947) as Floyd
- Out of the Past (1947) as Fisher
- The Arizona Ranger (1948) as Quirt Butler
- Guns of Hate (1948) as Anse Morgan
- Return of the Bad Men (1948) as Cole Younger
- Station West (1948) as Stellman
- Bodyguard (1948) as Fenton
- Rose of the Yukon (1949) as Major Geoffrey Barnett
- Brothers in the Saddle (1949) as Steve Taylor
- Rustlers (1949) as Mort Wheeler
- I Cheated the Law (1949) as Frank Bricolle
- Home of the Brave (1949) as T.J. Everett
- Massacre River (1949) as Burke Kimber
- Treasure of Monte Cristo (1949) as Earl Jackson
- The Big Wheel (1949) as Happy Lee
- Tough Assignment (1949) as Boss Morgan

=== 1950s ===
- The Great Plane Robbery (1950) as Murray
- Winchester '73 (1950) as Wesley
- Armored Car Robbery (1950) as Al Mapes
- It's a Small World (1950) as Charlie
- The Admiral Was a Lady (1950) as Mike O'Halloran - Boxer
- Kiss Tomorrow Goodbye (1950) as Joe 'Jinx' Raynor
- The Steel Helmet (1951) as Lieutenant Driscoll
- M (1951) as Police Lieutenant Becker
- The Sword of Monte Cristo (1951) as Sergeant
- Only the Valiant (1951) as Trooper Onstot
- Fighting Coast Guard (1951) as 'Red' Toon
- Two-Dollar Bettor (1951) as Rick Bowers - aka Rick Slate
- Joe Palooka in Triple Cross (1951) as Dutch
- Bal Tabarin (1952) as Joe Goheen
- Three for Bedroom "C" (1952) as Conde Marlowe
- Lady in the Iron Mask (1952) as Athos
- The Story of Will Rogers (1952) as Dave Marshall
- Army Bound (1952) as Matt Hall
- White Lightning (1953) as Jack Monohan
- The Beast from 20,000 Fathoms (1953) as Sergeant Loomis
- The Charge at Feather River (1953) as Private Ryan
- Donovan's Brain (1953) as Herbie Yocum
- Sea of Lost Ships (1953) as Lieutenant Rogers
- The Caine Mutiny (1954) as Chief Budge
- The Far Country (1954) as Ives
- Alfred Hitchcock Presents (1956) (Season 1 Episode 38: "The Creeper") as Steve Grant
- The Cruel Tower (1956) as Casey
- Gun Duel in Durango (1957) as Dunsten
- Alfred Hitchcock Presents (1957) (Season 2 Episode 28: "One More Mile to Go") as Motorcycle Cop
- Alfred Hitchcock Presents (1957) (Season 3 Episode 7: "Enough Rope for Two") as Maxie
- Under Fire (1957) as Captain Linn
- The Crooked Circle (1957) as Ken Cooper
- Alfred Hitchcock Presents (1958) (Season 3 Episode 30: "Death Sentence") as Al Revnel
- Spy in the Sky! (1958) as Vic Cabot
- Sierra Baron (1958) as Rufus Bynum
- Wanted: Dead or Alive (1958) Episode: "Miracle at Pot Hole" as Chester Miller aka Penfold Crane
- Wanted: Dead or Alive (1959) Episode: "Call Your Shot" as Jed Miller
- Arson for Hire (1959) as Arson Squad Inspector John 'Johnny' Broderick
- Here Come the Jets (1959) as Logan
- Rawhide (1959) (Season 2 Episode 15: "Incident of the Wanted Painter") as Marshal Coogan

=== 1960s ===
- Three Came to Kill (1960) as Dave Harris
- Blue Hawaii (1961) as Tucker Garvey
- Cheyenne (1961) Episode: "Winchester Quarantine" as Steve Maclay
- Gunsmoke (TV Series) (1961) "Old Yellow Boots" ... Welch
- A Girl Named Tamiko (1962) as James Hatten
- Cheyenne (1962) Episode: "Man Alone" as Buck Brown
- The Virginian (1963 episode "Run Away Home") as Sheriff Martin
- Of Love and Desire (1963) as Bill Maxton
- A Bullet for Billy the Kid (1963)
- Roustabout (1964) as Fred
- The Wild World of Batwoman (1966) as Jim Flanagan
- The Cycle Savages (1969) as Police Detective (uncredited)

=== 1970s ===
- Gunsmoke (TV Series) (1972) "No Tomorrow" ... Garth Brantley
- The Giant Spider Invasion (1975) as Dr. Vance

=== 1980s ===
- Frankenstein Island (1981) as Jocko
- Delta Pi (1984) as Jack Enoff
- The Wizard of Speed and Time (1988) as Lucky Straeker (final film role)
