= Curse of the Stone Hand =

- Directed by: Jerry Warren; Carlos Hugo Christensen; Carlos Schlieper
- Screenplay by: Marie Laurent; F. Amos Powell
- Produced by: Andrew Edwards; Carlos Gallart; Jerry Warren
- Starring: John Carradine; Chela Bon; Carlos Cores; Katherine Victor
- Cinematography: Ricardo Younis; Alfredo Traverso
- Edited by: Jerry Warren
- Music by: George Andreani
- Production companies: A.D.P. Pictures; Chile Films S.A.
- Distributed by: A.D.P. Pictures Inc.
- Release date: 3 March 1965 (Phoenix, Arizona)
- Running time: 72 minutes
- Countries: Chile; United States (framing story)
- Language: English

Curse of the Stone Hand is a 1965 horror film created by movie producer Jerry Warren by editing together two 1940s Chilean films, La casa está vacía (The House is Empty), a 1945 film directed by Carlos Schlieper, and La dama de la muerte (The Lady of Death), a 1946 film directed by Carlos Hugo Christensen (based on Robert Louis Stevenson's The Suicide Club).

Warren combined sections of each film, and padded out the running time with newly filmed footage he shot with actors John Carradine, Bruno VeSota (as narrator) and Katherine Victor.

It was released theatrically in 1965 on a double-bill alongside Warren's similarly constructed Face of the Screaming Werewolf.

== Plot ==
The film is a two-story anthology, sandwiched by a framing story that attempts to place the events of the two shorter stories as having all happened in the same house. An avid gambler moves into a cursed house in which he discovers a set of sculpted stone hands in a wall niche in the basement. The hands somehow put a curse on the occupant of the house, and the gambler comes to a bad end financially. The gambler joins what he thinks is a gambling club, only to learn it is actually a suicide club.

The house passes down to a different family in time, and the new owner's son becomes obsessed with the stone hands in the basement. He begins acting sadistically and develops hypnotic abilities, which he uses to control his brother's fiancee. She manages to free herself from the spell, and the hypnotist is killed.

== Cast ==
- John Carradine as The Old Drunk
- Chela Bon as Beth
- Carlos Cores as Robert Braun
- Katherine Victor as Connie's Sister
- Bruno Ve Sota (narrator)
- Ernesto Vilchesas as Uncle Huey
- Judith Sulian as Mrs. Braun
- Alejandro Flores as Charles
- Horacio Peterson as Jamie

== Reception ==
Critical reception for the film has been mostly negative. Author and film critic Leonard Maltin awarded the film a BOMB, his lowest rating, calling it "incoherent". On his website Fantastic Movie Musings and Ramblings, Dave Sindelar panned the film, criticizing the film's direction, writing and cutting; the latter he criticized as making the film incomprehensible. TV Guide noted that the film was worth seeing "if only to get a look at a Chilean horror film".
