= House of the Black Death =

1965 film by Harold Daniels, Reginald LeBorg & Jerry Warren

- Theatrical release poster under alternate title Blood of the Man Devil
- Directed by: Harold Daniels; Reginald LeBorg; Jerry Warren
- Written by: Lora Crozetti (novel The Widderburn Horror); Richard Mahoney
- Produced by: Richard Shotwell; William White
- Starring: John Carradine; Lon Chaney Jr.; Katherine Victor
- Cinematography: Murray De Atley
- Edited by: Jerry Warren
- Release date: 1965
- Running time: 89 minutes
- Country: United States
- Language: English

House of the Black Death (also known as Blood of the Man Devil) is a 1965 American horror film directed by Harold Daniels, Reginald LeBorg and Jerry Warren, and starring Lon Chaney Jr. and John Carradine – although the two actors shared no scenes in the film. It was written by Richard Mahoney based on the novel The Widderburn Horror by Lora Crozetti.

== Plot summary ==
Two elderly brothers who are warlocks, Belial and Andre, have been feuding with each other for years over the family estate. Belial, who sports small goat's horns on his forehead and runs a coven of witches, has been using his black magic to bewitch members of the family, while Andre spends the entire film bedridden. Andre keeps warning people that his brother Belial is evil and up to no good. Belial turns Andre's son into a werewolf by way of a magical spell and bewitches Andre's daughter (Serena) into dancing and gyrating sensuously. Much of the plot involves scenes of the sexy witches belly-dancing in front of their satanic altar.

== Cast ==
- Lon Chaney Jr. as Belial Desard
- John Carradine as Andre Desard
- Andrea King as Dr. Katherine Mallory
- Tom Drake as Paul Dessard
- Dolores Faith as Valerie Dessard
- Sabrina as belly-dancer
- Jerome Thor as Dr. Eric Campion
- Sherwood Keith
- Catherine Petty
- George Mitchell
- Katherine Victor as Lila
- Margaret Shinn

== Production ==
The film was originally to be titled Night of the Beast or The Widderburn Horror, but it was theatrically released as Blood of the Man Devil. When it was later released to television, the title was again changed to House of the Black Death. Although the film was made in 1965, when most new films were being made in color, it was shot in black-and-white for $70,000.

Harold Daniels initially shot the film in 1965 with actors Chaney and Carradine, and Reginald LeBorg co-directed in an uncredited capacity. Reginald LeBorg claimed that he did very little actual directing. He said his work "consisted of little more than some shots of actors wandering around amongst the trees in the forest scenes."

Afterwards, the producers felt the film needed something more, so Jerry Warren was hired to add some extra footage to pad out the running time and edit the film. Warren brought Katherine Victor into the project, casting her as the leader of a coven of witches. Interviewed by Tom Weaver, Warren said "They had a terrible mishmash of a movie. It wasn't a movie, it was a bunch of film. It came out bad but it came out playable, and it did pull out some money for the people who made it".

== Critical reception ==
Fred Olen Ray claims to have seen the film under the title Blood of the Man Devil in the drive-in in the early 1970s on a quintuple "Blood" bill with Blood Mania and three other films. The fact that the film was made in black and white might have had something to do with its distribution difficulties.

James O'Neill wrote "Cardboard monstrosity culled from footage contributed by three different directors ... Most of the veteran cast look sick or drunk, or both".

Stephen Jones called it "an incomprehensible mess ... with plenty of gratuitous belly-dancing".

Film historian Wheeler Winston Dixon remarked that on The House of the Black Death, "the less said the better".

== See also ==
- List of American films of 1965
