= Robert Clarke =

American actor (1920–2005)

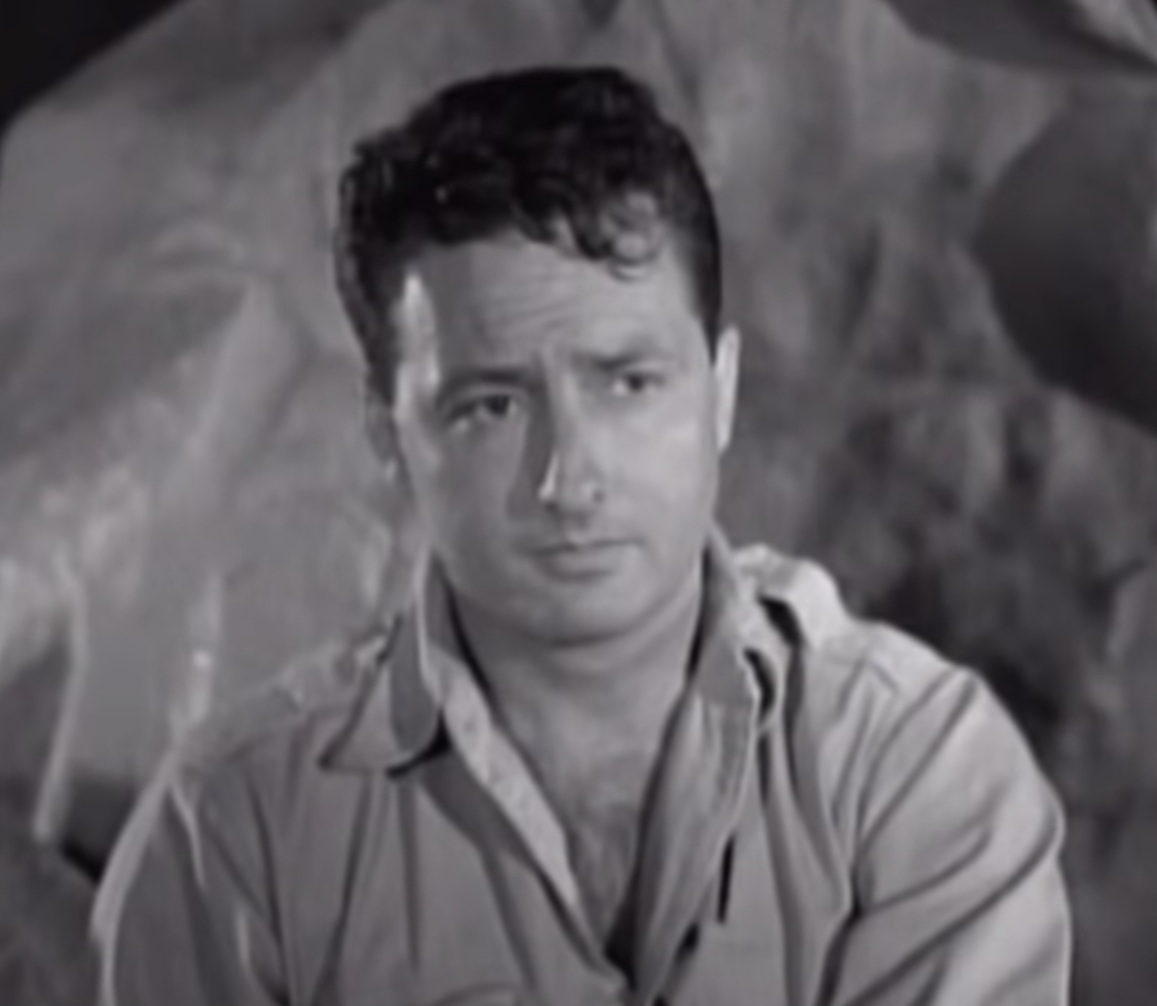
- Clarke in The Incredible Petrified World (1959)
- Born: Robert Irby Clarke; June 1, 1920; Oklahoma City, Oklahoma, U.S.
- Died: June 11, 2005 (aged 85); Valley Village, Los Angeles, California, U.S.
- Resting place: Forest Lawn Memorial Park, Hollywood Hills, California
- Occupations: Actor; director; producer; writer
- Years active: 1944–2005
- Spouse: Alyce King (m. 1956; died 1996)
- Children: Cam Clarke

Robert Irby Clarke (June 1, 1920 – June 11, 2005) was an American actor best known for his cult classic science fiction films of the 1950s. In succeeding decades he appeared in more conventional television, and in The King Family Show, a variety show based on the family of which his wife Alyce King Clarke was a member.

== Early life ==
Clarke was born and raised in Oklahoma City, Oklahoma. He attended Kemper Military School where he planned a military career, but asthma prevented his service in World War II. He enrolled in the University of Oklahoma and then the University of Wisconsin, where he began acting.

== Career ==
After screen tests at 20th Century-Fox and Columbia Pictures, Clarke landed a berth as a contract player at RKO Radio Pictures. His first credited role was The Falcon in Hollywood (1944), then went on to play small roles in The Body Snatcher (1945), Bedlam (1946), and Dick Tracy Meets Gruesome (1947). When RKO dropped his option three years later, he began freelancing.

In the 1950s, in addition to acting in genre films of all types, he is known for having appeared in several classic science fiction films, including The Man from Planet X (1951), The Incredible Petrified World (1957), The Astounding She-Monster (1957), From the Earth to the Moon (1958, narrator), Beyond the Time Barrier (1960), and The Hideous Sun Demon (1958), which Clarke wrote, directed and produced. He also appeared in the cult film Captain John Smith and Pocahontas (1953) as John Rolfe,

Clarke revealed in his 1996 autobiography To 'B' or Not to 'B' (co-written by Tom Weaver) that he made The Hideous Sun Demon for less than $50,000, including $500 for the rubberized lizard suit he wore. He shot the movie over 12 weekends to get two days' use of rental camera equipment for one day's fee. The Hideous Sun Demon was featured in the 1982 movie It Came from Hollywood, and with Clarke's permission, was re-dubbed into the 1983 comedy What's Up, Hideous Sun Demon (aka Revenge of the Sun Demon) featuring the voices of Jay Leno and Cam Clarke reprising his father's role. He later appeared in Alienator in 1990, Midnight Movie Massacre in 1988 and Frankenstein Island in 1981.

From the 1950s through the 1980s, he regularly appeared on television series, including appearing on The King Family Show (1965), and he sang on their tie-in albums. He made two guest appearances on Perry Mason, including the role of circus co-owner and murderer Jerry Franklin in the 1960 episode, "The Case of the Clumsy Clown" and as Jack Harper in the 1957 episode "The Case of the Crooked Candle". Other television appearances included The Lone Ranger, The Cisco Kid, Men Into Space, The Man and the Challenge, Hawaiian Eye, 77 Sunset Strip, Wendy and Me, General Hospital, Marcus Welby, M.D., Dragnet, Adam-12, Sea Hunt, Ripcord, Sky King, Checkmate, M Squad, Daktari, Baa Baa Black Sheep, Hawaii Five-O, Tabitha, Trapper John, M.D., Fantasy Island, Dallas, Simon & Simon, Knight Rider, Murder She Wrote, Matt Houston, Hotel, Dynasty, Falcon Crest, and dozens of others. The 1997 biographical documentary Lugosi: Hollywood's Dracula featured narration which he provided. Clarke's last appearance was in the movie The Naked Monster, a send-up of the classic science fiction films of the 1950s, in 2005.

In the mid-1960s, he served as spokesperson for a furniture and appliance store chain called Gold's Giant Stores. His autobiography, To "B" or Not to "B": A Film Actor's Odyssey, was published in 1996. In the late it's Clarke co-wrote "The Hideous She Demon" with Michael Goodell, published in Graphic Novella format for EMGEE Comics, and completed as a Screenplay/Shooting Script for EMGEE Studios and Krashenburn Films.

== Personal life ==
Clarke married Alyce King in 1956. They remained wed until her death in 1996. He was the father of actor and voice artist Cam Clarke.

== Death ==
Clarke died June 11, 2005, at his home in Valley Village, California from complications of diabetes. He was 85.

== Selected filmography ==
- The Falcon in Hollywood (1944) - Perc Saunders - Assistant Director
- What a Blonde (1945) - Man (scenes deleted)
- The Enchanted Cottage (1945) - Marine Corporal
- The Body Snatcher (1945) - Richardson - Medical Student (uncredited)
- Zombies on Broadway (1945) - Wimp (uncredited)
- Those Endearing Young Charms (1945) - Pilot (uncredited)
- Back to Bataan (1945) - Soldier (uncredited)
- Wanderer of the Wasteland (1945) - Jay Collinshaw
- Radio Stars on Parade (1945) - Danny
- First Yank Into Tokyo (1945) - Narrator / Prisoner Rosenbaum (uncredited)
- Sing Your Way Home (1945) - Reporter at New York Dock (uncredited)
- Man Alive (1945) - Cabby (uncredited)
- A Game of Death (1945) - Helmsman
- Ding Dong Williams (1946) - Club Creon Orchestra Leader (uncredited)
- Bedlam (1946) - Dan the Dog (uncredited)
- Sunset Pass (1946) - Ash Preston
- The Bamboo Blonde (1946) - Jonesy, Bamboo Blonde Crewman (uncredited)
- Step by Step (1946) - The Doctor (uncredited)
- Genius at Work (1946) - Ralph - Radio Announcer (uncredited)
- Lady Luck (1946) - Carstairs, the Confederate Officer / Messenger (uncredited)
- Criminal Court (1946) - Charlie - Club Circle Dance Director
- San Quentin (1946) - Tommy North
- Code of the West (1947) - Harry Stockton
- The Farmer's Daughter (1947) - Assistant Announcer (uncredited)
- Desperate (1947) - Bus Driver (uncredited)
- Thunder Mountain (1947) - Lee Jorth
- Under the Tonto Rim (1947) - Hooker
- Dick Tracy Meets Gruesome (1947) - Fred - Police Analyst (uncredited)
- The Judge Steps Out (1948) - Reporter (uncredited)
- If You Knew Susie (1948) - Bob - Orchestra Leader (uncredited)
- Fighting Father Dunne (1948) - Priest (uncredited)
- Return of the Bad Men (1948) - Dave
- Beyond Glory (1948) - Bit part (uncredited)
- Ladies of the Chorus (1948) - Peter Winthrop (uncredited)
- Riders of the Range (1950) - Harry Willis
- Champagne for Caesar (1950) - Actor in Movie at Drive-In (uncredited)
- A Modern Marriage (1950) - Bill Burke
- Outrage (1950) - Jim Owens
- Sword of D'Artagnan (1951) - D'Artagnan
- The Man from Planet X (1951) - John Lawrence
- Tales of Robin Hood (1951) - Robin Hood
- Hard, Fast and Beautiful (1951) - Gordon McKay
- Manana (1951) - Larry Sawyer
- Pistol Harvest (1951) - Jack Green
- Drums in the Deep South (1951) - Union Officer (uncredited)
- Street Bandits (1951) - Fred Palmer
- The Valparaiso Story (1951)
- The Fabulous Senorita (1952) - Jerry Taylor
- Captive Women (1952) - Robert
- Sword of Venus (1953) - Robert Dantes
- Oiltown, U.S.A. (1953) - Bob Johnson
- The Body Beautiful (1953) - Adam Roberts
- Captain John Smith and Pocahontas (1953) - Rolfe
- New Faces of 1954 (1954) - Himself
- Her Twelve Men (1954) - Dream Crown Prince / Junior Senator (uncredited)
- The Black Pirates (1954) - Manuel Azaga
- King of the Carnival (1955) - Jim Hayes
- The Benny Goodman Story (1956) - Roger Gillespie - Alice's Escort (uncredited)
- Outlaw Queen (1957) - John Andrews
- Band of Angels (1957) - Auction Participant (uncredited)
- The Helen Morgan Story (1957) - Party Guest (uncredited)
- My Man Godfrey (1957) - George
- The Astounding She-Monster (1957) - Dick Cutler
- The Deep Six (1958) - Ens. David Clough (uncredited)
- The Hideous Sun Demon (1958, also wrote, directed and produced) - Dr. Gilbert McKenna
- Girl with an Itch (1958) - Orrie Cooper
- From the Earth to the Moon (1958) - Narrator (voice, uncredited)
- Date with Death (1959) - Joe Emmanuel
- The FBI Story (1959) - Bartender (uncredited)
- The Incredible Petrified World (1959) - Craig Randall
- Timbuktu (1959) - Captain Girard
- Cash McCall (1960) - Reporter (uncredited)
- Beyond the Time Barrier (1960) - Maj. William Allison
- The Last Time I Saw Archie (1961) - Officer (uncredited)
- Sea Hunt (1961, Episode: "Top Secret") - Carl Sexton
- Terror of the Bloodhunters (1962) - Steve Duval
- Secret File: Hollywood (1962) - Maxwell Carter
- The Lively Set (1964) - Physician (uncredited)
- Zebra in the Kitchen (1965) - Sheriff
- The Restless Ones (1965)
- Dragnet (1967) S1-E12 Clayton Fillmore — hit and run driver
- Dragnet (1968) S2-E17, "The Big Search" - Bert Stanley
- Adam-12 Episode 69 "Log:66 The Vandals" (1970)
- Where's Willie? (1978)
- Born Again (1978) - Computer Controller
- Frankenstein Island (1981) - Dr. Paul Hadley
- First Strike (1985)
- Midnight Movie Massacre (1988) - Col Carlyle
- Alienator (1990) - Lund
- The Naked Monster (2005) - Major Allison (final film role)
