= Terror of the Bloodhunters =

- Theatrical release half-sheet display poster
- Directed by: Jerry Warren
- Written by: Jerry Warren
- Produced by: Jerry Warren (producer)
- Starring: Robert Clarke; Steve Conte; Dorothy Haney
- Cinematography: Bill William
- Edited by: Jerry Warren
- Distributed by: ADP
- Release date: May 3, 1962
- Country: United States
- Language: English

Terror of the Bloodhunters is a 1962 independently made American black-and-white low budget survival horror film, produced, directed, written, and edited by Jerry Warren, that stars Robert Clarke, Dorothy Haney, and Steve Conte.

The film was released in the U.S. May 3, 1962 as a double feature with Warren's Invasion of the Animal People.

== Plot ==
The daughter of the Devil's Island commandant takes off with two escaped French prisoners through the treacherous jungles of French Guiana. They must survive not only dangerous wild animals and disease, but the prison guards who are searching for them, as well as a ferocious South American tribe of headhunters.

== Cast ==
- Robert Clarke as Steve Duval
- Dorothy Haney as Marlene
- Robert Christopher as Whorf
- William White as Dione
- Steve Conte as Cabot
- Niles Andrus as Commandant
- Herbert Clarke as Muller
- Darrold Westbrooke as Jacobe
- Mike Concannon as Lt. Vaardo
- Charles Niles Sr. as Estes
- Alberto Soria as Officer

== Production ==
Terror of the Bloodhunters was shot in Griffith Park in Los Angeles, with a lot of stock footage added from other films.
