= Virgil W. Vogel =

American film director

- Born: Virgil William Vogel; November 29, 1919; Peoria, Illinois, U.S.
- Died: January 1, 1996 (aged 76); Tarzana, Los Angeles, U.S.
- Occupation: Television director
- Years active: 1950–1995

Virgil William Vogel (November 29, 1919 – January 1, 1996) was an American television and film director. His career spanned nearly sixty years, directing episodes of Wagon Train, Bonanza, The Big Valley, and Mission: Impossible, among other series. Earlier in his career he was also a film editor.

== Career ==
Vogel was born in Peoria, Illinois.

He received the Air Medal for 50 missions commanding the B-29 over the skies of Japan.

Vogel began his career working for Universal Pictures, editing a number of films namely Mystery Submarine (1950), Abbott and Costello Meet the Invisible Man (1951), The Man from the Alamo (1953) and Touch of Evil (1958) directed by Orson Welles.

In 1956 Vogel made his directorial debut with the science fiction film The Mole People. He also directed the regional comedy film The Kettles on Old MacDonald's Farm and the science fiction adventure film The Land Unknown, both released in 1957. In 1959 he directed the Swedish-American science fiction-horror film Rymdinvasion i Lappland (Space Invasion of Lapland) that was shortened and then reedited with new footage when released in the U.S. as Invasion of the Animal People.

For the remainder of his career, he focused primarily on television, directing episodes of Wagon Train, Bonanza, The Big Valley, M Squad, Mission: Impossible, The Six Million Dollar Man, The F.B.I., The Streets of San Francisco, Most Wanted, Police Story, The White Shadow, Centennial, Knight Rider, Airwolf, Magnum, P.I., Miami Vice, Spenser For Hire, among other series.

Vogel also directed the pilot episodes of Street Hawk and Walker, Texas Ranger.

He and Rex Smith (star of the former series), both being pilots, enjoyed flying together in the same plane. Rex relates, “We worked till late on Friday’s but always were up a six, to play tennis, then fly our military style ‘missions’, followed by dinner and drinks. He had the energy of a man half his age, and it was a challenge to keep up him!” I miss and admire and am proud to have been accepted as a co pilot and friend, I miss the man and adventures shared.”

== Personal life and death ==
Vogel was the nephew of cinematographer Lee Garmes.

On January 1, 1996, he died of unspecified causes in Tarzana, Los Angeles, at the age of 76.
