= The Incredible Petrified World =

1957 film by Jerry Warren

- Promotional poster
- Directed by: Jerry Warren
- Written by: John W. Steiner
- Produced by: Jerry Warren
- Starring: John Carradine; Robert Clarke; Phyllis Coates; Allen Windsor; Sheila Noonan
- Cinematography: Victor Fisher
- Edited by: Harold V. McKenzie; James Sweeney
- Music by: Josef Zimanich
- Distributed by: Governor Films Inc.
- Release dates: November 12, 1959; April 16, 1960; (Los Angeles re-release)
- Running time: 67 minutes
- Country: United States
- Language: English

The Incredible Petrified World is a 1959 horror adventure film produced and directed by Jerry Warren, and starring John Carradine, Phyllis Coates and Robert Clarke. The film follows four explorers who travel down into the depths of the sea and get stranded in an underwater cavern.

The film was completed by Warren in 1958, but remained unreleased until November 22, 1959 when it played on a double feature with another Warren film Teenage Zombies (1959), at least in South Carolina and Texas.

The film was released later in Los Angeles on April 16, 1960, again on a double bill with Teenage Zombies (1959).

== Plot ==
Professor Millard Wyman sends a crew of two men, Paul Whitmore and Craig Randall, and two women, Lauri Talbott and Dale Marshall, down to ocean depths never before explored. A technical problem during the launch causes the diving bell to break free of the cable connecting them to the surface and it loses contact. The mission is believed lost.

The crew survive, don their scuba gear and leave the bell. Instead of reaching the surface, they surface in a cavern. They explore the cave and find a skeleton, then a disheveled old sailor named Matheny who tells them that he and another sailor suffered a shipwreck fourteen years prior and that he has been living in these caves ever since. He claims there is no way out and a volcano provides air from the surface.

Meanwhile, up on the surface Prof. Wyman's younger brother builds another bell and launches it in an attempted rescue mission. However, with the old man in the cave starting to leer lecherously at the women, and the volcano growing more unstable, the second mission may not find them in time. The old man reveals to the women that he murdered the other sailor years ago, increasing their apprehension. Just as he is about to assault one of the girls, the volcano erupts and the old man is crushed under falling rocks. The stranded crew of the diving bell make their way up toward the surface and are rescued.

== Cast ==
- John Carradine as Dr. Millard Wyman
- Robert Clarke as Craig Randall
- Allen Windsor as Paul Whitmore
- Phyllis Coates as Dale Marshall
- George Skaff as Matheny
- Lloyd Nelson as Wilson
- Sheila Noonan (aka Sheila Carol) as Lauri Talbott
- Maurice Bernard as Old Man in the Caverns
- Joe Maierhauser as Jim Wyman
- Harry Raven as Captain
- Jack Haffner as Jimmy
- Jerry Warren (director cameo) man on plane
- Milt Collion as Hank
- Robert Carroll as the Narrator

== Production ==
In an interview, star Robert Clarke said that the cinematographer was a well-known Hollywood cameraman who used the pseudonym "Victor Fisher" to avoid trouble with the union for taking a job on a non-union picture. The cavern sequences were shot at Colossal Cave in Tucson, Arizona. Phyllis Coates was never paid for her performance.

Warren had a monster suit built to use in the film, but "it ended up looking too bad even for Warren", so the suit was scrapped. The ad line retained the mention of the monster however, stating "A Nightmare of Terror in the Center of the Earth with Forgotten Men, Monsters, Earthquakes and Boiling Volcanos!"

=== Reception ===
Thomas Reddy in the Los Angeles Examiner commented "In a film of this type, you'd expect a monster or two. But no, not one teensy-weensy monster. The closest thing to it is a bearded bum found living in the cavern....it's incredible that for more than a hour, nothing the least bit exciting happens." The film opens with some stock footage showing a shark battling, and tearing apart, an octopus (perhaps these were the monsters spoken of in the ad line).

Bill Warren said "The film is so uneventful that it's puzzling as to why it was ever made....it has no possible reason for existence....there is at least one zombie in Teenage Zombies". He goes on to state "The film may have taken an entire week to shoot, and Carradine probably did all his work in one day."

== See also ==
- List of American films of 1959
- List of films in the public domain in the United States
