= Brianne Murphy =

British cinematographer (1933–2003)

- Murphy on the set of Trapper John, M.D. in 1981
- Born: Geraldine Brianne Murphy; 1 April 1933; London, England, UK
- Died: 20 August 2003 (aged 70); Puerto Vallarta, Mexico
- Occupation: Cinematographer

Geraldine Brianne Murphy (1 April 1933 – 20 August 2003) was a British cinematographer. She was the first female director of photography for a major studio film and the first female who became a member of the American Society of Cinematographers Guild. Murphy is often referred to as a pioneer for women in the film industry.

== Biography ==
Murphy was born in London, England where her father was working on the railroad in Britain. While her whole family was living in the UK due to her father's career, her parents were both middle class Americans. With the threat of the war in England coming, the family made the decision to move back to America. At a young age, Murphy's' parents divorced. She created her own opportunities by taking advantage of small positions in the film industry and made her way in a "man's world" of cinematography Once she moved to Hollywood she fell in love with B-movie film director Jerry Warren who she went on to marry. They eventually divorced before having any children.

== Career ==
In the 1950s, Brianne Murphy started her career in the film industry in New York. Murphy was educated in English and American schools before she set her sights on an acting career and attended the Neighborhood Playhouse in New York City and Pembroke College. During the filming of a movie called "On the Waterfront" in New York, she made an effort to hang around the set and eventually was asked to run errands for the production manager. After doing this, the director agreed to let Murphy watch the rest of the filming process. This allowed her to gain more insight into what went into making the film while teaching her how to use the equipment properly. She took this as a learning experience and started to search for more jobs in the industry. In order to become "more American", she worked as a trick rider with a rodeo for a season. In 1954, she crashed the Ringling Bros. and Barnum & Bailey Circus at Madison Square Garden on opening night and performed as a clown for the entire evening. The resulting publicity helped Murphy land a job as a still photographer with the traveling circus and eventually led her to Hollywood. She soon began working with low-budget filmmakers Jerry Warren and Ralph Brooke, both of whom she married. While working on these low-budget films, Murphy was promoted to production manager due to her strategic decisions to save money by using the same crew and actors and shooting movies back-to-back. While working in production management, she would often use herself as a second cameraman on set, once again getting more experience.

Murphy's career began to take off in 1975 when Richard Glouner, a member of the American Society of Cinematographers, who had worked with Murphy as a script supervisor in the past, had to leave a show, Columbo, that he was working on and suggested Murphy take over for him. In 1980, she was the first female director of photography on a major studio picture, Fatso. In 1982, Murphy won an Academy Award for Scientific and Engineering Achievement. She was also nominated for four Emmys for cinematography, winning for outstanding cinematography for the series Highway to Heaven in 1985.

Murphy struggled to get jobs at times due to the fact that she was a female attempting to make a place in a male dominated industry. She attempted to join her local union branch in 1973 where she was told by a union officer that she would be accepted "over his dead body". When he died, she went back to the Union and told the new Union Officer what had happened before. Upon hearing this, he did allow Brianne to join. This only encouraged Murphy to work harder. She eventually made it into this union, being the first female executive board member to join. Murphy was recognized as the woman who brought women's rights into the film industry. In order to avoid discrimination, she would at times use an abbreviated version of her name "Brian" and would talk with a deep voice on the phone as a way to improve her chances of getting a job. She would also use her initials G.B. to avoid revealing that she was a woman.

== Filmography ==
Cinematographer credits:

Film	Role in film	Year of Film
Wonder Woman	Cinematography	1974
Five Finger Discount	Cinematography	1975
Fatso	Cinematography	1980
Breaking Away	Cinematography	1980
Highway to Heaven	Director of photography	1985
There Were Times, Dear	Cinematography	1987
Mulligan Stew	Cinematography	1972-1981
ABC Afterschool Special	Cinematography	1972-1997
Little House on the Prairie	Cinematography	1974-1983
Trapper John, M.D.	Cinematography	1979-1986
Father Murphy	Cinematography	1981-1984
In the Heat of the Night	Cinematography	1988-1994

== Death ==
On 20 August 2003, Brianne Murphy died suffering from a combination of lung cancer and a brain tumor, both of which she had been struggling with since April. At the age of 70, in Puerto Vallarta, Mexico she died.

== Awards ==
=== Daytime Emmy Awards ===
- Won: Outstanding Individual Achievement in Children's Programming For: NBC Special Treat (For the episode "Five Finger Discount", 1975)

=== Emmy Awards ===
- Nominated: Outstanding Cinematography for a Miniseries or a Special For: There Were Times, Dear (1987)
- Nominated: Outstanding Cinematography for a Series For: Highway to Heaven (For the episode "A Match Made in Heaven", 1985)
- Nominated: Outstanding Cinematography for a Series For: Breaking Away (For the episode "La Strada", 1980)

=== Academy Award ===
- Won: Scientific and Engineering Award Plaque for the concept, design and manufacture of the MISI Camera Insert Car and Process Trailer (Shared with Donald Schisler, 1982)

=== Women in Film Crystal and Lucy Awards ===
- Recipient - Crystal Award for outstanding women who, through their endurance and the excellence of their work, have helped to expand the role of women within the entertainment industry. (1984)
- Recipient - Lucy Award in recognition of her excellence and innovation in her creative works that have enhanced the perception of women through the medium of television. (1995)
