= Katherine Victor =

American actress (1923–2004)

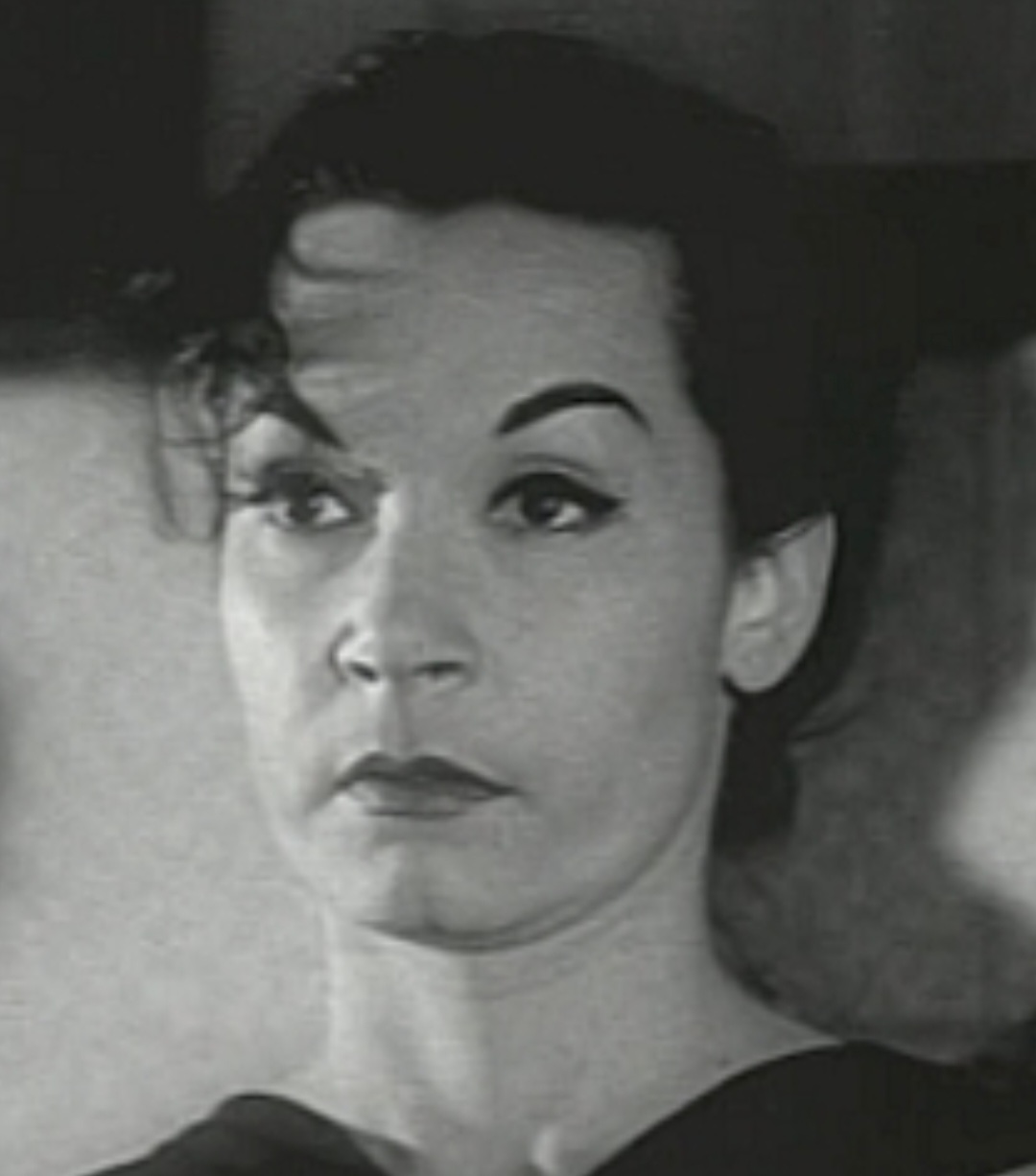
- Victor in Teenage Zombies (1960)
- Born: Katena Ktenavea; August 18, 1923; Hell's Kitchen, Manhattan, New York City, U.S.
- Died: October 22, 2004 (aged 81); West Hills, Los Angeles, California, U.S.
- Resting place: Forest Lawn Memorial Park, Hollywood Hills
- Other names: Katina Vea
- Occupation: Actress
- Years active: 1953–2004

Katherine Victor (born Katena Ktenavea; August 18, 1923 – October 22, 2004) was an American actress, perhaps best known for her roles in Ron Ormond's Mesa of Lost Women (1953) and a number of Jerry Warren's films. She was also known as Katina Vea.

== Early years ==
Victor was born in the Hell's Kitchen, Manhattan, neighborhood of New York City, but she grew up in Los Angeles.

== Career ==
Victor began acting in the late 1940s, working on stage and on radio. Her film debut came in Mesa of Lost Women (1953).

Victor's work for Warren included Teenage Zombies (1959), Creature of the Walking Dead (1965), House of the Black Death (1965), The Wild World of Batwoman (1966), and Frankenstein Island (1981). She also co-starred in The Cape Canaveral Monsters (1960), directed by Phil Tucker, and the TV movie Fear No Evil.

During the 1970s, Katherine (who used the film name Kathrin) co-starred in indie filmmaker Brian Pinette's The Centerfold and From Caviar to Coleslaw which was written for her and filmed on location in Houston, Texas. She recorded two songs for the film From Caviar to Coleslaw: "The Winds of Change" and "Did I Love Too Much?".

Her later films included Bikini Summer (1991), a supporting role in Fugitive Rage (1996) directed by Fred Olen Ray, and a role as Mary Jo Trent in Superguy: Behind the Cape (2004). From 1960 to 2000, she also worked in various capacities (generally as continuity director/ animation checker) on a number of Disney animated films and cartoons and productions of other studios such as Hanna-Barbera and Filmation.

== Personal life ==
=== Death ===
On October 22, 2004, Victor died after suffering a stroke. Her gravesite is at Forest Lawn, Hollywood Hills Cemetery in Los Angeles.

=== Papers ===
Victor's papers (1943–2002) are housed at the Margaret Herrick Library in Beverly Hills, California.
