= Elaine Edwards (disambiguation) =

Elaine Edwards (1929–2018) was an American politician.

Elaine Edwards may also refer to:

- Elaine Edwards (actress), actress who was in Three Blondes in His Life
- Elaine Edwards, actress who was in Fiddler on the Roof
- Elaine Edwards, a character in The Bondage
