= Lou Krugman =

American film, radio, stage and television actor

- Krugman in The Lawless Years, 1959
- Born: July 19, 1914; Passaic, New Jersey, U.S.
- Died: August 8, 1992 (aged 78); Burbank, California, U.S.
- Occupation: Actor
- Years active: 1948–1980

Lou Krugman (July 19, 1914 – August 8, 1992) was an American film, radio, stage and television actor.

== Life and career ==
Krugman was born in Passaic, New Jersey. He attended and graduated from Clifton High School. He performed in radio, and he played villains in numerous NBC radio serials. He began his screen career in 1948, appearing in the film To the Ends of the Earth. In 1950, he appeared in the films Where the Sidewalk Ends and Kim.

Later in his career, Krugman guest-starred in numerous television programs including Gunsmoke, Bonanza, The Life and Legend of Wyatt Earp, Have Gun – Will Travel, Perry Mason, The Rockford Files, The Dick Van Dyke Show, Maverick, The Wild Wild West, The Streets of San Francisco, Wanted Dead or Alive and Hogan's Heroes. He also appeared in films such as Our Man Flint, I Want to Live!, The Rains of Ranchipur, Irma la Douce, The Purple Gang and The Detective. During his screen career, in 1959, he appeared in the stage play The Diary of Anne Frank.

Krugman retired from acting in 1980, last providing additional voices in the ABC animated television series Spider-Woman.

== Death ==
Krugman died from cancer at the Providence Saint Joseph Medical Center in Burbank, California on August 8, 1992, at the age of 78.
