= The Black Pirates =

1954 film

- Directed by: Allen H. Miner
- Written by: Fred Freiberger; Al C. Ward
- Starring: Anthony Dexter; Robert Clarke; Martha Roth; Toni Gerry; Lon Chaney Jr.
- Cinematography: Gilbert Warrenton
- Music by: Manuel Díaz Conde
- Distributed by: Kit Parker Films; Lippert Pictures
- Release date: December 24, 1954
- Running time: 74 minutes
- Countries: United States; Mexico; El Salvador
- Language: English

The Black Pirates is a 1954 Ansco Color adventure film made by Salvador Films Corp. about a band of pirates scouring a small Central American town for a buried treasure. It was directed by Allen H. Miner and produced from a screenplay by Fred Freiberger and Al C. Ward based on the story by Johnston McCulley.

The film stars Anthony Dexter and Martha Roth with Robert Clarke, Toni Gerry and Lon Chaney Jr.

The tagline of the movie was "Wild Raiders of the Tropic Seas!". It was filmed on location in Panchimalco, El Salvador. Filming started in mid-June 1954 and the movie was released in December and distributed in Latin America under the title El Pirata Negro.

The Black Pirates was the first film that Cinema Research Corporation was hired to do the special effects for.

== Plot ==
Pirates arrive in a small town in Central America. When they find a church in the spot they were expecting treasure, they enslave the townspeople to dig for that treasure. But the pirates find that there is more to be had than what they expected.

== Cast ==
- Anthony Dexter as Capt. Zargo
- Martha Roth as Juanita
- Lon Chaney Jr. as Padre Felipe (as Lon Chaney)
- Robert Clarke as Manuel Azaga
- Víctor Manuel Mendoza as Castro
- Toni Gerry as Carlotta Luisa Maria Viego
- Alfonso Bedoya as Garza
- Jorge Treviño as (as George Trevino)

also starring
Francisco Reiguera
Eddie Dutko
Clai Simmons
Laura Roth
Jerry St. John
