= Milan Smith (actor) =

American actor and stuntman

- Born: April 27, 1923; South Dakota, U.S.
- Died: May 2, 2001 (aged 78); Victorville, California, U.S.
- Occupations: Actor, stuntman
- Years active: 1951–1969
- Spouse: Myrna Smith

Milan Smith (April 27, 1923 – May 2, 2001) was an American actor and stuntman. He was perhaps best known for playing Kyle in the American western television series Rawhide.

== Life and career ==
Smith was born in Wagner, South Dakota to a Yankton Sioux family, where he was raised on a Dakota Sioux reservation. He served the Pacific during World War II.

Smith worked for almost 20 years as a stunt double. His first appearances were in 1951 in the western television series The Lone Ranger. While appearing in the show he became friends with actor Jay Silverheels, who played the role of Tonto. He appeared on numerous television westerns including, Gunsmoke, Bonanza, The Wild Wild West, Tombstone Territory, The Rifleman, The Virginian, Maverick, The Life and Legend of Wyatt Earp, Death Valley Days, Branded, Wanted: Dead or Alive, Bat Masterson, Tales of Wells Fargo and Wagon Train.

Smith was a regular cast member on the western television series Rawhide from 1959 to 1960, playing the role of Kyle. He appeared in films including Duel on the Mississippi, Masterson of Kansas, Rio Bravo, The Adventures of Bullwhip Griffin, Stagecoach to Dancers' Rock, Jesse James vs. the Daltons, Here Come the Marines, Waco, The Toughest Gun in Tombstone, Cattle Queen of Montana and Escape from Fort Bravo. He retired in 1969, last appearing in the film Change of Habit.

After retiring, Smith became a horse trainer. His friend Jay Silverheels was involved in breeding, training and racing Standardbred horses. After Silverheels died from complications of pneumonia on March 5, 1980, at the age of 62, Smith named a horse Hi Ho Silverheels in his honour. He raced it as a pacer.

== Death ==
Smith died on May 2, 2001, in Victorville, California, at the age of 78.
