= Raymond Greenleaf =

American actor (1892–1963)

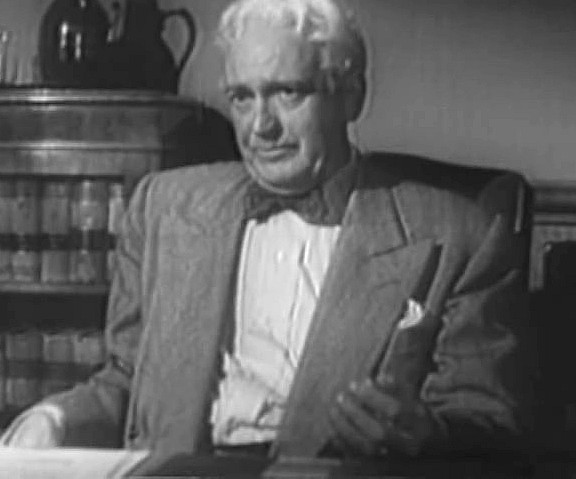
- Greenleaf in Port of New York (1949)
- Born: Roger Ramon Greenleaf; January 1, 1892; Gloucester, Massachusetts, U.S.
- Died: October 29, 1963 (aged 71); Woodland Hills, Los Angeles, California, U.S.
- Resting place: Oakwood Memorial Park Cemetery
- Occupation: Actor
- Years active: 1948–1963

Raymond Greenleaf (born Roger Ramon Greenleaf; January 1, 1892 – October 29, 1963) was an American stage and film actor. Among his best-known film appearances are All the King's Men (1949), Angel Face (1952), and Pinky (1949).

== Early life ==
He was born as Roger Ramon Greenleaf on January 1, 1892 in Gloucester, Massachusetts.

== Career ==
In the early 1920s, Greenleaf acted with the Jack X. Lewis Company in summer stock theatre. He had earlier performed with stock theater companies in Boston and in Bridgeport, Connecticut. In the fall of 1921, he was with the Orpheum Players in Ottawa, Canada.

Greenleaf's Broadway credits include Alice in Wonderland (1947), Yellow Jack (1947), A Pound on Demand / Androcles and the Lion (1946), King Henry VIII (1946), Foxhole in the Parlor (1945), Decision (1944), Jason (1942), and Your Loving Son (1941).

In the late 1940s, Greenleaf went into film business and appeared in over 130 film and television productions until 1963, when he died. He was often cast in supporting roles as an authority figure, roles as judges, doctors, politicians or priests can be found multiple times in his filmography.

== Death ==
Greenleaf died in Woodland Hills, Los Angeles, California at the age of 71 and is buried at Oakwood Memorial Park Cemetery, Chatsworth, California.

== Partial filmography ==
- The Naked City (1948) – City Editor (uncredited)
- Deep Waters (1948) – Judge Tate (uncredited)
- For the Love of Mary (1948) – Justice Williams
- State Department: File 649 (1949) – Examining Board Member (uncredited)
- A Kiss in the Dark (1949) – Martin Soames
- Slattery's Hurricane (1949) – Admiral William F. Olenby
- Pinky (1949) – Judge Shoreham
- All the King's Men (1949) – Judge Monte Stanton
- Port of New York (1949) – John J. Meredith (uncredited)
- East Side, West Side (1949) – Horace Elcott Howland
- No Sad Songs for Me (1950) – Mr. Caswell
- A Ticket to Tomahawk (1950) – Mayor (uncredited)
- David Harding, Counterspy (1950) – Dr. George Vickers
- On the Isle of Samoa (1950) – Peter Appleton
- Harriet Craig (1950) – Henry Fenwick
- Al Jennings of Oklahoma (1951) – Judge Jennings
- Storm Warning (1951) – Faulkner
- Pier 23 (1951) – Father Donovan
- As Young as You Feel (1951) – Bill (uncredited)
- The Secret of Convict Lake (1951) – Tom Fancher (uncredited)
- A Millionaire for Christy (1951) – Benjamin Chandler
- The Family Secret (1951) – Henry Archer Sims
- Ten Tall Men (1951) – Sheik Ben Allal
- FBI Girl (1951) – Governor Owen Grisby
- Deadline – U.S.A. (1952) – Lawrence White (uncredited)
- Paula (1952) – President Russell
- Washington Story (1952) – John Sheldon
- She's Working Her Way Through College (1952) – Dean Rogers
- Bonzo Goes to College (1952) – Dean Williams (uncredited)
- Horizons West (1952) – Eli Dodson
- Angel Face (1953) – Arthur Vance
- The Bandits of Corsica (1953) – Paoli
- South Sea Woman (1953) – Captain at Court-martial
- The Last Posse (1953) – Arthur Hagan
- Three Sailors and a Girl (1953) – B.P. Morrow – Bank President
- Living It Up (1954) – Conductor
- The Violent Men (1955) – Dr. Henry Crowell (uncredited)
- Violent Saturday (1955) – Mr. Fairchild (uncredited)
- Son of Sinbad (1955) – Simon Aristides
- Headline Hunters (1955) – Paul Strout
- Texas Lady (1955) – Knox (uncredited)
- Lassie -(1955)- S1E19 “Father” - Rev. Harding
- Never Say Goodbye (1956) – Dr. Kelly Andrews
- When Gangland Strikes (1956) – Luke Ellis
- Over-Exposed (1956) – Max West
- You Can't Run Away from It (1956) – Minister
- Three Violent People (1956) – Carleton
- Spoilers of the Forest (1957) – Clyde Walters
- Monkey on My Back (1957) – Dr. A.J. Latham
- The Vampire (1957) – Autopsy Surgeon (uncredited)
- The Night the World Exploded (1957) – Governor Chaney
- No Time to Be Young (1957) – The Dean (uncredited)
- Jeanne Eagels (1957) – Elderly Lawyer (uncredited)
- Official Detective – Episode: "Extortion" (1958) – Paul Nidemyer
- Quantrill's Raiders (1958) – General (uncredited)
- The Buccaneer (1958) – Junior State Senator
- The Story on Page One (1959) – Judge Carey
- From the Terrace (1960) – Fritz Thornton
- Wild in the Country (1961) – Dr. Underwood
- Birdman of Alcatraz (1962) – Judge (uncredited)
- The Alfred Hitchcock Hour (1963) (Season 1 Episode 27: "Death and the Joyful Woman") - Doctor
