= Ten Tall Men =

1951 film by Willis Goldbeck

- Film poster
- Directed by: Willis Goldbeck
- Screenplay by: Roland Kibbee; Frank Davis
- Story by: James Warner Bellah; Willis Goldbeck
- Produced by: Harold Hecht
- Starring: Burt Lancaster; Jody Lawrance; Gilbert Roland
- Cinematography: William E. Snyder
- Edited by: William A. Lyon
- Music by: David Buttolph
- Color process: Technicolor
- Production companies: Norma Productions; Hallburt Productions
- Distributed by: Columbia Pictures
- Release date: October 26, 1951 (New York)
- Running time: 97 minutes
- Country: United States
- Language: English
- Box office: $1.8 million (U.S. rentals)

Ten Tall Men is a 1951 American adventure film starring Burt Lancaster and directed by Willis Goldbeck. The plot concerns an American sergeant serving in the French Foreign Legion during the Rif War in Morocco.

== Plot ==
After capturing an important Rif prisoner in an undercover operation, American sergeant Mike Kincaid of the French Foreign Legion is imprisoned for striking a rival lieutenant who beats a French woman with his riding crop for preferring Kincaid to him. He is imprisoned alongside seven military prisoners and the captured Rif who has refused to talk. The lieutenant refuses to feed Kincaid and the Rif, but Kincaid's two comrades, Luis Delgado and Pierre Molier, sneak food and water to him, which he shares them with the Rif. To repay Kincaid's kindness, the Rif informs him of an impending attack on Tarfa while the garrison is weak. The Rif believes that Kincaid will escape to save himself, but Kincaid instead persuades the lieutenant to release him so that he may lead a series of guerrilla hit-and-run attacks to delay the enemy for five days until the regiment returns. Kincaid agrees to testify that the idea was the lieutenant's. The only men available for the mission are the seven prisoners, who receive full pardons for their crimes. Kincaid's two corporals join them, raising their number to ten.

When scouting an enemy camp, the legionnaires discover that two rival tribes have joined forces, making them strong enough to take the city. Using his expertise in disguise and language, Kincaid learns that the Rif leader, Khalid Hussein, is marrying Mahla in order to cement an alliance with the other tribe. Kincaid kidnaps Mahla to force the enemy to chase him for five days. Mahla begins to fall in love with Kincaid as Hussein pursues the legionnaires across the desert. The patrol finds a destroyed French Foreign Legion truck containing a safe that one of the men opens to reveal a large legion payroll. When a man named Jardine tries to flee with the payroll, he is shot, which alerts the Rifs to their location.

Kincaid is eventually captured and Mahla is freed. She demands that unless Kincaid is released unharmed, she will not marry Hussein, and Hussein reluctantly complies. Kincaid and his men infiltrate the wedding ceremony and fighting ensues. Mahla's tribe switches sides and Hussein is killed.

== Cast ==
- Burt Lancaster as Sergeant Mike Kincaid
- Jody Lawrance as Mahla
- Gilbert Roland as Corporal Luis Delgado
- Kieron Moore as Corporal Pierre Molier
- George Tobias as Londos
- John Dehner as Jardine
- Nick Dennis as Mouse
- Mike Mazurki as Roshko
- Gerald Mohr as Khalif Hussein
- Ian MacDonald as Lustig
- Mari Blanchard as Marie DeLatour
- Donald Randolph as Yussif
- Robert Clary as Mossul
- Henry Rowland as Kurt
- Michael Pate as Browning
- Stephen Bekassy as Lieutenant Kruger
- Raymond Greenleaf as Sheik Ben Allal
- Paul Marion as Eijah

== Production ==
The film was the first of a two-picture deal that Columbia Pictures had signed with Norma Productions, the company owned by star Burt Lancaster and producer Harold Hecht. The second would be The First Time (1952), a film in which Lancaster does not appear.

The original story, written by James Warner Bellah and Willis Goldbeck, concerned a conflict between the United States Cavalry and Apache Indians. However, Lancaster and Hecht felt that "John Ford and other Hollywood operators have so effectively decimated the Apache population" and hired writer A.I. Bezzerides to reimagine the story with a French Foreign Legion setting during the Rif War (1911–1926). Roland Kibbee and Frank Davis were hired to rewrite the script to make it more comedic.

Goldbeck directed the film but withdrew before its completion following disputes with Lancaster, and the film was completed by Robert Parrish.

The film was shot in February 1950 at the Columbia Ranch in the San Fernando Valley and on location in Yuma, Arizona and Palm Springs, California.

== Reception ==
In a contemporary review for The New York Times, critic Bosley Crowther wrote:

[T]he fellows who wrote this noisy picture and the actors who play in it ... apparently never heard the order that these big Foreign Legions affairs are supposed to be done with straight faces. Or else they just didn't give a damn. The latter appears the more likely, for these Norma people are the ones who played hob with the Robin Hood tradition in last year's "The Flame and the Arrow" ... And now the same sort of gay abandon is being shown in their tossing around of a yarn of the Foreign Legion. Let's settle; they didn't give a damn. The consequence is a fandango of shenanigans on the desert sands that would curl the waxed mustaches of Sir Percival Christopher Wren. Foreign Legionnaires have at Riff bandits with the fury of Keystone cops. Desert beauties are snatched away from harems to loud bursts of anticipatory squeals. And a daredevil Foreign Legion sergeant does such reckless and downright hammy deeds as would cause the late Beau Geste to shudder with horror and blush with shame. But there's no use crying about it. If your humor is in a tolerant state—and you're not one of those traditionalists—you will find it a bushel of fun.
