= Greta Thyssen =

Danish actress (1927–2018)

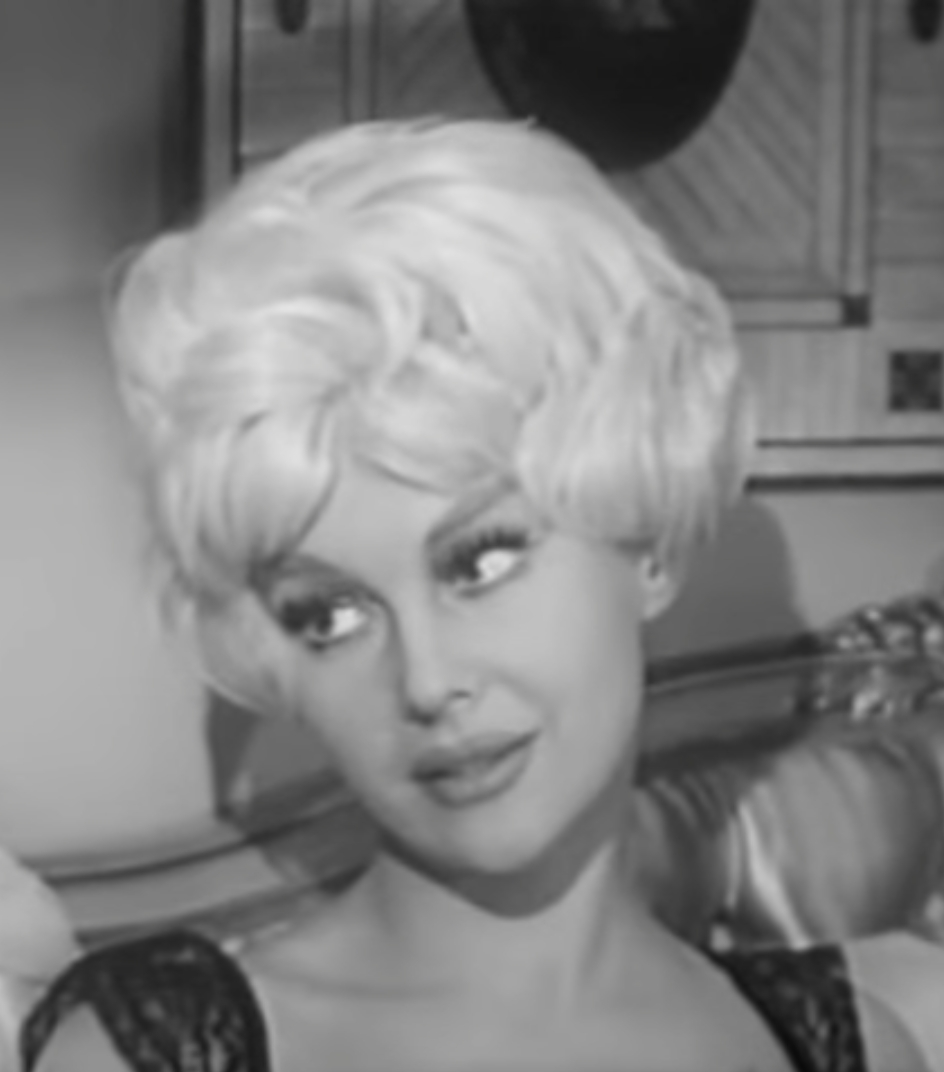
- Thyssen in Three Blondes in His Life (1961)
- Born: Grethe Karen Thygesen; 30 March 1927; Hareskovby, Denmark
- Died: 6 January 2018 (aged 90); Manhattan, New York City, U.S.
- Occupations: Actress; model
- Years active: 1950–1967
- Spouses: Al Trilla (m. 1952; div. 1953) Ralph Padula (m. 1953; div. 1955) George Ronald Starr (m. 1959; div. 1961) Theodore Roy Guenther (m. 1963; died 2000)
- Children: 1

Greta Thyssen (born Grethe Karen Thygesen; 30 March 1927 – 6 January 2018) was a Danish film actress and former model, long-resident in the United States. Born in Hareskovby, Denmark, she appeared in films and television series between 1956 and 1967.

== Career ==
Thyssen arrived in the United States after winning the Miss Denmark crown in 1951. She attempted to follow in the footsteps of the reigning blonde sex symbols Marilyn Monroe and Jayne Mansfield by forging a movie career. She was Monroe's double in Bus Stop, and appeared in Accused of Murder, Terror Is a Man, Three Blondes in His Life and Journey to the Seventh Planet.

In addition to her appearances on the television series Dragnet and Bachelor Father, she appeared as Roxy Howard, the title character in the Perry Mason episode, "The Case of the Nervous Accomplice". Thyssen also appeared on Broadway in Pajama Tops, as a replacement for June Wilkinson.

Thyssen is probably best remembered for her appearances in the Three Stooges films Quiz Whizz, Pies and Guys and Sappy Bull Fighters. In her brief stint with the Stooges, she endured a cream pie to the face in the second film. From 1956 to 1958, Thyssen was the original Pirate Girl on the game show Treasure Hunt, assisting host Jan Murray with presenting prizes hidden in miniature treasure chests. After appearing in the musical comedy Cottonpickin' Chickenpickers (1967), she retired from acting.

== Legal problem ==
On October 5, 1953, Thyssen was ordered deported from the U.S. for having violated her visitor's permit in two ways: the permit had expired in March 1953, and despite her status as a visitor, she worked in films and television.

== Personal life ==
Thyssen was married four times. Her fourth marriage was to Theodore Guenther, with whom she had a daughter, Genevieve Juliette Guenther.

On 6 January 2018, Thyssen died of pneumonia at her home in Manhattan, aged 90.

== Filmography ==
Feature Films

- Bus Stop (1956) Monroe double
- Accused of Murder (1956)
- The Beast of Budapest (1958)
- Catch Me If You Can (1959)
- Shadows (1959)
- Terror Is a Man (1959)
- Three Blondes in His Life (1961)
- Journey to the Seventh Planet (1962)
- The Double-Barrelled Detective Story (1965)
- Cottonpickin' Chickenpickers (1967)

Short Films

- Quiz Whizz (1958)
- Pies and Guys (1958)
- Sappy Bull Fighters (1959)
