= The Purple Gang (film) =

1960 film

- Directed by: Frank McDonald
- Written by: Jack DeWitt
- Produced by: Lindsley Parsons
- Starring: Barry Sullivan; Robert Blake; Jody Lawrance
- Cinematography: Ellis W. Carter
- Edited by: Maurice Wright
- Music by: Paul Dunlap
- Production company: Allied Artists
- Distributed by: Allied Artists
- Release date: January 5, 1960
- Running time: 85 minutes
- Country: United States
- Language: English

The Purple Gang is a 1960 American period crime film directed by Frank McDonald and starring Barry Sullivan, Robert Blake and Jody Lawrance. It portrays the activities of The Purple Gang bootlegging organization in Detroit in the 1920s

== Plot ==
A fictionalized account of The Purple Gang as they smuggled liquor in 1920s Detroit, Michigan.

== Cast ==
- Barry Sullivan as Police Lt. William P. Harley
- Robert Blake as William Joseph 'Honeyboy' Willard
- Elaine Edwards as Gladys Harley
- Marc Cavell as Henry Abel 'Hank' Smith
- Jody Lawrance as Joan MacNamara
- Suzanne Ridgway as Daisy
- Joe Turkel as Eddie Olsen
- Victor Creatore as Al Olsen
- Paul Dubov as Thomas Allen 'Killer' Burke
- Ray Boyle as Tom Olsen
- Kathleen Lockhart as Nun
- Nestor Paiva as Laurence Orlofsky
- Lou Krugman] as Dr. Riordan
- Robert Anderson as Police Commissioner
- Mauritz Hugo as Licovetti
- James Roosevelt as Himself in Prologue

== Production ==
The movie was one of a series of gangster films financed by Allied Artists after the success of Al Capone (1959).

The Purple Gang was directed by Frank McDonald and was produced by Lindsley Parsons under the company Lindsley Parsons Productions, Inc.

The film details the formation of The Purple Gang and their criminal operations in Detroit, Michigan. It left out that the majority of The Purple Gang was Jewish.

The film opened with newsreels and Congressman James Roosevelt, the son of Franklin D. Roosevelt, saying that "despite its entertainment value, the film points out that only by an awakened citizenry can crime be successfully fought." Roosevelt's introduction is followed by a statement that explains the plot of the film. 1930s newsreel footage is interspersed throughout the film. The Los Angeles Evening Citizen News said that the film's narration "adds a convincing documentary flavor to the picture." The narration was provided by Barry Sullivan as his character Bill Harley.

== Release ==
The film was released on January 5, 1960 by Allied Artists. It was released on VHS in 1992 and on DVD in 2011 through the Warner Archive Collection.

== Reception ==
Variety said "Skillful blending of newsreel and stock footage with excellent staged material gives it an atmosphere certain to engross and excite juve and adult audiences alike. It looks like a b.o. winner. Director Frank McDonald has avoided horror, and, with greater taste, concentrated on terror. Violent deaths abound in countless numbers, but the more explicit details of cruelty are omitted."

Glenn Erickson of DVD Talk said, "The obvious hook with the true facts of The Purple Gang is the teen angle: in 1959 movie screens were awash with juvenile delinquency pictures. But the script as written sticks with gangster clichés, not adolescent angst." Dave Kehr of The New York Times wrote, "Produced by the cash-strapped independent Allied Artists, the film employs a minimally rendered period setting to provide cover for a more or less frank admiration (at least, up until the last reel) of youth in revolt: teenagers with tommy guns."

== Bibliography ==
- Stanfield, Peter. The Cool and the Crazy: Pop Fifties Cinema. Rutgers University Press, 2015.
