= The Brigand (1952 film) =

1952 film

- Original film poster
- Directed by: Phil Karlson
- Written by: Jesse L. Lasky Jr.
- Based on: George Bruce (treatment); Alexandre Dumas (novel)
- Produced by: Edward Small (uncredited)
- Starring: Anthony Dexter; Jody Lawrance; Anthony Quinn
- Cinematography: W. Howard Greene
- Edited by: Jerome Thoms
- Music by: Mario Castelnuovo-Tedesco
- Color process: Technicolor
- Production company: Resolute Pictures
- Distributed by: Columbia Pictures
- Release dates: July 25, 1952 (New York); July 30, 1952 (Los Angeles)
- Running time: 94 minutes
- Country: United States
- Language: English

The Brigand is a 1952 American adventure romance film directed by Phil Karlson and starring Anthony Dexter, Jody Lawrance and Anthony Quinn.

== Cast ==
- Anthony Dexter as Captain Carlos Delargo/King Lorenzo of Mandorra
- Jody Lawrance as Princess Teresa
- Gale Robbins as Countess Flora
- Anthony Quinn as Prince Ramon
- Carl Benton Reid as Prime Minister Triano
- Ron Randell as Captain Ruiz
- Ian MacDonald as Maj. Schrock
- Lester Matthews as Dr. Lopez
- Walter Kingsford as Sultan of Morocco
- Holmes Herbert as Archbishop
- George Melford as Majordomo (uncredited)

== Production ==
In May 1949, it was reported that producer Edward Small had hired Robert Libott and Frank Burt to write a script. In December, Small signed a two-year contract with Columbia Pictures to produce projects that he had been developing, starting with the adventure film Lorna Doone (1951). In August 1950, Small announced that he would produce two films for Columbia starring Anthony Dexter: The Brigand and a remake of the 1921 Rudolph Valentino romantic drama The Sheik.

In May 1951, Jesse L. Lasky Jr. was reportedly writing the script for The Brigand, and Phil Karlson was announced as the director.

Filming began on July 9, 1951.

== Reception ==
In a contemporary review for The New York Times, critic Howard Thompson called the film a "harmless time-killer" and wrote: "For some strange reason no producer credit is given to 'The Brigand' ... This hardly precipitates a crisis because the picture is no great shakes. But neither, as a standard sample of this type of entertainment, is it hard to take. The studio finally has got around to utilizing its Valentino prototype of two seasons past, Anthony Dexter. And the result, for all its familiarity and juvenile absurdities, isn't nearly as pretentious or dull as that immortalization of the Great Lover."

Critic John L. Scott of the Los Angeles Times wrote: "'The Brigand' goes in heavy for serial-type action—cliffhanging, it used to be called in the old days. Serious characterization gives way to dash and color."
