= Lorna Doone (1951 film) =

1951 film

- Theatrical poster
- Directed by: Phil Karlson
- Screenplay by: Jesse L. Lasky Jr.; Richard Schayer
- Adaptation by: George Bruce
- Based on: Lorna Doone by R. D. Blackmore
- Produced by: Edward Small
- Starring: Barbara Hale; Richard Greene
- Cinematography: Charles Van Enger
- Edited by: Al Clark
- Music by: George Duning
- Color process: Technicolor
- Production company: Edward Small Productions
- Distributed by: Columbia Pictures
- Release dates: March 30, 1951 (Canada); May 25, 1951 (Hartford, Connecticut); September 20, 1951 (New York); July 18, 1951 (Los Angeles)
- Running time: 84 minutes
- Country: United States
- Language: English

Lorna Doone is a 1951 American historical adventure film directed by Phil Karlson and starring Barbara Hale and Richard Greene. It is an adaptation of the 1869 novel Lorna Doone by R. D. Blackmore, set in the English West Country during the 17th century.

== Plot ==
Lorna Doone loves John Ridd but is betrothed against her will to Carver Doone. As the English Civil War looms, John is determined to defeat the vicious Doone family and win Lorna.

== Cast ==
- Barbara Hale as Lorna Doone
- Richard Greene as John Ridd
- Carl Benton Reid as Sir Ensor Doone
- William Bishop as Carver Doone
- Ron Randell as Tom Faggus
- Sean McClory as Charleworth Doone
- Onslow Stevens as Counsellor Doone
- Lester Matthews as King Charles II
- John Dehner as Baron de Wichehalse
- Gloria Petroff as Lorna Doone as a Child

== Production ==
In 1946, Edward Small announced plans to film the 1869 novel Lorna Doone, written by R. D. Blackmore, and hired George Bruce to write the screenplay. Charles Bennett worked with Bruce on the early drafts of the script. Small sent representatives to Great Britain to scout locations, and he wanted to shoot the film on location in Scotland. In 1948, Small announced that the film would be a coproduction with J. Arthur Rank and would star Louis Hayward.

In 1948, Alfred Hitchcock announced plans to film the novel for Transatlantic Pictures, the short-lived production company that he founded with Sidney Bernstein. Small claimed that he had registered the title in the United States, meaning that Hitchcock could film the story but would not be able to title the film Lorna Doone during its American release. Small announced that he would start filming in England in association with Rank and producer John Beck on March 1, 1949. The date was postponed as a result of the short-lived American export boycott of films to the British market in response to excessive tariffs, and in August 1949, filming was delayed indefinitely. The project was reactivated in 1949 when Small signed a two-picture deal with Columbia Pictures for Lorna Doone and The Brigand (1952).

Jesse L. Lasky Jr. wrote the final draft of the script. The film was produced in Hollywood, and filming started on May 17, 1950. Location shooting occurred at Yosemite National Park. The final script was heavily influenced by Westerns.

== Reception ==
In a contemporary review for The New York Times, critic Oscar Godbout wrote: "For those who like their Technicolor adventures ripe with revolution, swordplay, grimly evil oppressors and a tall, noble heroine, 'Lorna Doone' will be their meat and drink. But it's stale meat and flat drink. ... Even with the help of Technicolor, which enhances most anything, Greene and Miss Hale giv e resoundingly empty performances. ... It would seem that Phil Karlson, the director, could have done a little better by Richard D. Blackmore's doughty saga of old England. But he didn't, with the result that there is little to recommend in this 'freely adapted' version of the novel."
