= Cinema Research Corporation =

American special effects company

- Company type: Incentive
- Industry: Special effects
- Founded: 1953; Brooklyn, New York
- Founder: Charles Patti
- Defunct: 2000
- Fate: Defunct
- Successor: None
- Headquarters: Hollywood, California
- Area served: Worldwide

Cinema Research Corporation (CRC) was an American special effects company in Hollywood, California, and one of the first to produce effects, trailers, opticals, and titles under one roof. The company was the special effects industry leader for decades, until Industrial Light and Magic surpassed them in the late 1980s. In 1990, CRC began to concentrate its efforts on titles and opticals, and became the industry leader in those categories, by providing the titles and opticals for over 400 productions in the decade before the CEO's passing in 2000.

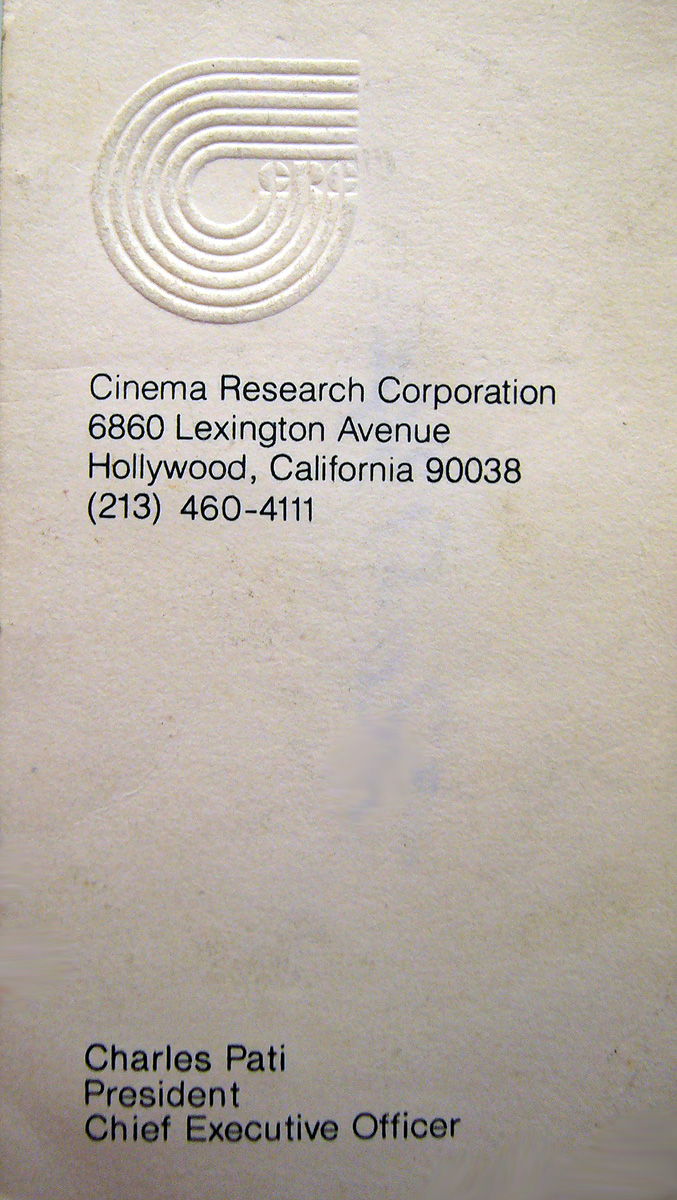
Business card for CEO of Cinema Research Corporation from 1971 with old area code for Hollywood, California with defunct phone number.

== History ==
Cinema Research Corporation was founded in 1953 by Charles Pati from Brooklyn, New York. He moved to California at the age of 40 with the dream of getting involved with the film industry in Hollywood. By 1954, he had his first title, The Black Pirates, for which he created the special effects. By the end of that decade, he owned the largest special effects studio in Hollywood. His company, Cinema Research Corporation did titles, opticals, trailers, and special effects.

The Compound was located at 6860 Lexington Avenue, in Hollywood, California. It took up a square block. CRC was an early pioneer in the special effects community, and evolved into all areas of film related to pre- and post-production, until Charlie Pati died in 2000 at 86 years old. During its heyday, his company was involved in over 670 full-length Hollywood movies. Charles Pati's passing ended Cinema Research Corporation, however others have used a DBA (Doing Business As) CRC, but none succeeded, and all are now defunct.

== Credits ==
- 1954-2000: 617 film credits for titles, trailers and/or optical effects credited to Cinema Research Corporation, and 61 films in which Cinema Research Corporation did the special effects.
Films
- 1950s
  The Black Pirates 1954,
  Massacre 1956
- 1960s
  The Wizard of Mars 1965,
  The Beach Girls, and the Monster 1965,
  Jesse James Meets Frankenstein's Daughter 1966,
  Star Trek: Miri 1966,
  Star Trek: The Doomsday Machine 1967,
  Star Trek: Wink of an Eye 1968,
  Star Trek: Is There in Truth No Beauty? 1968,
  Star Trek: The Omega Glory 1968,
  Star Trek: The Gamesters of Triskelion 1968,
  Targets 1968
  The Immortal (Pilot) 1969,
  Star Trek: All Our Yesterdays 1969,
  Star Trek: The Cloud Minders 1969.
- 1970s
  Woodstock 1970,
  Godchildren 1971,
  Mad Dogs Englishmen 1971,
  Longstreet: Pilot 1971,
  Across 110th Street 1972,
  Beware! The Blob 1972,
  A Thief in the Night 1972,
  Women in Chains 1972 TV,
  The Magician: Pilot #10 1973,
  A Ghost of a Chance 1973,
  Ground Zero 1973
  Acapulco Gold 1973,
  The Magician 1973,
  Flash Gordon 1974,
  Hearts and Minds 1974,
  It's Good to Be Alive 1974,
  Blood on the Mountain 1974,
  Happy Days: Tell It to the Marines 1975,
  Happy Days: They Call It Potsie Love 1975,
  Happy Days: Fonzie's New Friend 1975,
  Happy Days: Three on a Porch 1975,
  Happy Days: A Date with Fonzie 1975,
  Happy Days: Fonzie the Flatfoot 1975,
  Happy Days: Howard's 45th Fico # 1975,
  Happy Days: Jailhouse Rock 1975,
  Happy Days: Richie Fights Back 1975,
  Happy Days: The Other Richie Cunningham 1975,
  Happy Days: Fearless Fonzarelli: Part 2 1975,
  Happy Days: Fearless Fonzarelli: Part 1 1975,
  Happy Days: The Motorcycle 1975,
  Happy Days: Fonzie Moves In 1975,
  Chac 1975,
  Teenage Seductress 1975,
  Dead Aim 1975,
  The Front 1976,
  Laverne Shirley: Mother Knows Worst 1976,
  Laverne Shirley: From Suds to Stardom 1976,
  Laverne Shirley: How Do You Say Are You Dead in German? 1976,
  It's Showtime 1976,
  Laverne Shirley: Hi, Neighbor 1976,
  Laverne Shirley: Fakeout at the Stakeout 1976,
  Laverne Shirley: It's the Water 1976,
  Laverne Shirley: Dating Slump 1976,
  Laverne Shirley: One Flew Over Milwaukee 1976,
  Laverne Shirley: Once Upon a Rumor 1976,
  Laverne Shirley: Dog Day Blind Dates 1976,
  Happy Days: Arnold's Wedding 1976,
  Laverne Shirley: Falter at the Altar 1976,
  Happy Days: A Sight for Sore Eyes 1976,
  Laverne Shirley: A Nun's Story 1976,
  Happy Days: Bringing Up Spike 1976,
  Happy Days: Beauty Contest 1976,
  Laverne Shirley: Bowling for Raspberries 1976,
  Happy Days: Two Angry Men 1976,
  Laverne Shirley: The Bachelor Party 1976,
  Happy Days: Fonzie the Superstar 1976,
  Happy Days: Football Frolics 1976,
  Happy Days: The Second Anniversary Show 1976,
  Happy Days: Dance Contest 1976,
  Black Sunday 1977,
  Foes 1977,
  Renaldo Clara 1978,
  Superman 1978
  Faces of Death 1978,
  Cops Robin 1978 TV,
  The Great American Girl Robbery 1979,
  More American Graffiti 1979,
  Breaking Away 1979,
  HOTS 1979,
  Beyond the Poseidon Adventure 1979,
  The Kids Are Alright 1979,
  The Hitter 1979,
  When You Comin' Back, Red Ryder? 1979,
  Elvis 1979,
  The Late Great Planet Earth 1979,
  The Meateater 1979.
- 1980s
  The Jazz Singer 1980,
  Cosmos 1980,
  Altered States 1980,
  Popeye 1980,
  Superman II 1980,
  Fade to Black 1980,
  Galaxina 1980,
  When Time Ran Out 1980,
  Saturn 3 1980,
  The Killing of America 1981,
  Evilspeak 1981,
  Faces of Death II 1981,
  Outland 1981,
  Inchon 1981,
  This Is Elvis 1981,
  The Slayer 1982,
  Zapped! 1982,
  Hollywood: The Gift of Laughter 1982 TV,
  Lights, Camera, Annie! 1982 TV,
  Wavelength 1983,
  Twilight Zone: The Movie 1983,
  The Final Terror 1983,
  Treasure of the Four Crowns 1983,
  The House on Sorority Row 1983,
  Runaway 1984,
  2010 1984,
  A Nightmare on Elm Street 1984,
  Mutant 1984,
  Gremlins 1984,
  Stop Making Sense 1984
  Blame It on Rio 1984,
  Reckless 1984,
  Fandango 1985,
  Spies Like Us 1985,
  The Heavenly Kid 1985,
  Crimewave 1985,
  Ladyhawke 1985,
  Head Office 1985,
  The Hitcher 1986,
  Three Amigos! 1986,
  The Mosquito Cot 1986,
  An American Tail 1986,
  Spot Marks the X 1986 TV,
  Jumpin' Jack Flash 1986,
  Children of a Lesser God 1986,
  The Boy Who Could Fly 1986,
  River's Edge 1986,
  Armed Dangerous 1986,
  Jason Lives: Friday the 13th Part VI 1986,
  Out of Bounds 1986,
  Back to School 1986,
  Cobra 1986,
  The Adventures of Milo Otis 1986,
  Top Gun 1986,
  Fire with Fire 1986,
  April Fool's Day 1986,
  The Hitcher 1986,
  Broadcast News 1987,
  Wall Street 1987,
  3 Men and a Baby 1987,
  Teen Wolf Too 1987,
  Cherry 2000 1987,
  Made in Heaven 1987,
  Real Men 1987,
  Fatal Attraction 1987,
  Five Corners 1987,
  Lionheart 1987,
  Back to the Beach 1987,
  Happy New Year 1987,
  Maid to Order 1987,
  Superman IV: The Quest for Peace 1987,
  Summer School 1987,
  Dragnet 1987,
  Beverly Hills Cop II 1987,
  Hot Pursuit 1987,
  Steele Justice 1987,
  Malone 1987,
  Extreme Prejudice 1987,
  Gardens of Stone 1987,
  The Lt Innocent Man 1987 TV,
  Infidelity 1987 TV,
  Three for the Road 1987,
  Down Twisted 1987,
  Over the Top 1987,
  A Nightmare on Elm Street 3: Dream Warriors 1987,
  The Accidental Tourist 1988,
  The Boost 1988,
  I'm Gonna Git You Sucka 1988,
  Mississippi Burning 1988,
  The Naked Gun: From the Files of Police Squad! 1988,
  Heart of Midnight 1988,
  Child's Play 1988,
  Heathers 1988,
  Mystic Pizza 1988,
  Without a Clue 1988,
  Cohen and Tate 1988,
  Far North 1988,
  Miracle Mile 1988,
  Hot to Trot 1988,
  Married to the Mob 1988,
  Bat 21 1988,
  Vibes 1988,
  Midnight Run 1988,
  Dracula's Widow 1988,
  Pumpkinhead 1988,
  Coming to America 1988,
  Bull Durham 1988,
  The Night Train to Kathmu 1988 TV,
  Illegally Yours 1988,
  Red River 1988 TV,
  The Arrogant 1988,
  Johnny Be Good 1988,
  Dominick Eugene 1988,
  Bloodsport 1988,
  Remote Control 1988,
  St Deliver 1988,
  Cop 1988,
  Tapeheads 1988,
  A Night in the Life of Jimmy Reardon 1988,
  The Unholy 1988,
  Fresh Horses 1988,
  Apartment Zero 1988,
  Bull Durham 1988,
  Pulse 1988,
  Honeymoon Academy 1989,
  Wild Orchid 1989,
  Born on the Fourth of July 1989,
  Desperado: Bald Justice 1989 TV,
  Enemies: A Love Story 1989,
  Back to the Future Part II 1989,
  Harlem Nights 1989,
  The Little Mermaid 1989,
  After Midnight 1989,
  Robot Jox 1989,
  Immediate Family 1989,
  Lisa 1989,
  Ghosts Can't Do It 1989,
  Catch Me If You Can 1989,
  Desperado: The Outlaw Wars 1989 TV,
  Not Quite Human II 1989 TV,
  Black Rain 1989,
  Chattahoochee 1989,
  Drugstore Cowboy 1989,
  Old Gringo 1989,
  Heart of Dixie 1989,
  Let It Ride 1989,
  A Nightmare on Elm Street 5: The Dream Child 1989,
  Friday the 13th Part VIII: Jon Takes Manhattan 1989,
  Great Balls of Fire! 1989,
  Tales from the Crypt: The Man Who Was Death 1989,
  Paint It Black 1989,
  War and Remembrance: Part 11 1989,
  Checking Out 1989,
  Field of Dreams 1989,
  The Karate Kid Part III 1989,
  Disorganized Crime 1989,
  She's Out of Control 1989,
  I, Madman 1989,
  Cutting Class 1989,
  Troop Beverly Hills 1989,
  The Women of Brewster Place 1989,
  Out Cold 1989,
  True Believer 1989,
  Her Alibi 1989,
  Farewell to the King 1989,
  Three Fugitives 1989
  The Experts 1989,
  Limit Up 1989,
  Shocker 1989,
  Friday the 13th Part VIII: Jason Takes Manhattan 1989,
  Leviathan 1989.
- 1990s
  Look Who's Talking Too 1990,
  Awakenings 1990,
  Edward Scissorhands 1990,
  Descending Angel 1990 TV,
  Rocky V 1990
  Child's Play 2 1990,
  Jacob's Ladder 1990,
  Avalon 1990,
  Dances with Wolves 1990,
  Night of the Living Dead 1990,
  Marked for Death 1990,
  Narrow Margin 1990,
  Reversal of Fortune 1990,
  Cold Dog Soup 1990,
  The Hot Spot 1990,
  Men at Work 1990,
  Heat Wave 1990 TV,
  Air America 1990,
  Flatliners 1990,
  The Two Jakes 1990,
  Navy Seals 1990,
  Fatal Skies 1990,
  Days of Thunder 1990,
  Framed 1990 TV,
  Dick Tracy 1990,
  Total Recall 1990,
  Back to the Future: Part III 1990,
  Enid Is Sleeping 1990,
  Cadillac Man 1990,
  A Show of Force 1990,
  Daddy's Dyin' Who's Got the Will? 1990,
  Short Time 1990,
  Spaced Invaders 1990,
  Miami Blues 1990,
  Crazy People 1990,
  Cry-Ba 1990,
  Catch fire 1990,
  Side Out 1990,
  Pretty Woman 1990,
  The Hunt for Red October 1990,
  Waiting for the Light 1990,
  Courage Mountain 1990,
  Madhouse 1990,
  Revenge 1990,
  Flashback 1990,
  Love at Large 1990,
  I Come in Peace 1990,
  Tremors 1990,
  Ski Patrol 1990,
  Why Me? 1990,
  Blue Steel 1990,
  Heart of the Deal 1990,
  Secret Agent OO Soul 1990,
  Night of the Living Dead 1990,
  Come See the Paradise 1990,
  Daddy's Dyin' Who's Got The Will? 1990,
  The Guardian 1990,
  Love at Large 1990,
  Livin' Large! 1991,
  Cold Heaven 1991,
  Paradise 1991,
  Rambling Rose 1991,
  Cast a Deadly Spell TV 1991,
  The Rapture 1991,
  Dead Again 1991,
  Mystery Date 1991,
  The Doctor 1991,
  Bingo 1991,
  Return to The Blue Lagoon 1991,
  Another You 1991,
  Point Break 1991,
  Highway to Hell 1991,
  Rover Dangerfield 1991,
  City Slickers 1991,
  Soapdish 1991,
  The Indian Runner 1991,
  Hudson Hawk 1991,
  Wild Hearts Can't Be Broken 1991,
  What About Bob? 1991,
  Boyz n The Hood 1991,
  Madonna: Truth or Dare 1991,
  Mannequin: On The Move 1991,
  Talent for The Game 1991,
  Committed 1991,
  My Heroes Have Always Been Cowboys 1991,
  The Pit and the Pendulum 1991
  The Doors 1991,
  Scenes from a Mall 1991,
  Fourth Story 1991 TV,
  Eve of Destruction 1991,
  Grand Canyon 1991,
  The Prince of Tides 1991,
  Strays 1991 TV,
  Bugsy 1991,
  Star Trek VI: The Undiscovered Country 1991,
  The Addams Family 1991,
  All I Want for Christmas 1991,
  Pyrates 1991,
  Preminger Anatomy of a Filmmaker 1991
  Cool Ice 1991,
  Frankie and Johnny 1991,
  Shout 1991,
  To The Moon, Alice 1991,
  Deceived 1991,
  White Lie 1991,
  That Night 1992,
  Used People 1992,
  Ring of The Musketeers 1992,
  Love Potion No 9 1992,
  Dracula 1992,
  Jennifer 8 1992,
  Hero 1992,
  Tom and Jerry The Movie 1992,
  Equinox 1992,
  Singles 1992,
  The Public Eye 1992,
  El Mariachi 1992,
  Storyville 1992,
  Single White Female 1992,
  Buffy The Vampire Slayer 1992,
  Death Becomes Her 1992,
  Universal Soldier 1992,
  Boomerang 1992,
  Patriot Games 1992,
  Cruel Doubt 1992,
  Me Myself and I 1992,
  Red Shoe Diaries 1992 TV,
  Visions of Light 1992,
  Folks! 1992,
  Leaving Normal 1992,
  Honor Thy Mo 1992 TV,
  The Secret 1992 TV,
  Stompin at The Savoy 1992 TV
  Sleepwalkers 1992,
  Secrets 1992 TV,
  Thunderheart 1992,
  The Power of One 1992,
  Bic Instinct 1992,
  In Sickness and in Health 1992,
  Gladiator 1992,
  Once Upon a Crime 1992,
  Double Trouble 1992,
  Wayne's World 1992,
  Back in The USSR 1992,
  O Pioneers! 1992 TV,
  Memphis 1992 TV,
  Rapid Fire 1992,
  Cliffhanger 1993,
  Tombstone 1993,
  The Pelican Brief 1993,
  Love, Cheat Steal 1993,
  My Life 1993,
  Blink 1993,
  Mo There's Boys 1993,
  Pumpkinhead II: Blood Wings 1993,
  Mr Jones 1993,
  Cool Runnings 1993,
  For Love or Money 1993
  The Thief 1993,
  The Cobbler 1993,
  Rudy 1993,
  Striking Distance 1993,
  Even Cowgirls Get The Blues 1993,
  True Romance 1993,
  Searching for Bob Fischer 1993,
  Robin Hood: Men in Tights 1993,
  Poetic Justice 1993,
  Hot Shots! Part Deux 1993,
  Sliver 1993,
  Cliffhanger 1993,
  Lost in Yonkers 1993,
  Posse 1993,
  Red Rock West 1993,
  Shootfighter: Fight to The Death 1993,
  At Home with The Webbers 1993,
  Wide Sargasso Sea 1993,
  Indecent Proposal 1993,
  Army of One 1993,
  The Adventures of Huck Finn 1993,
  Fire in The Sky 1993,
  The Temp 1993,
  Untamed Heart 1993,
  Heartbeat 1993 TV,
  The Vanishing 1993,
  Groundhog Day 1993,
  Rage Honor II 1993,
  Body of Evidence 1993,
  It was a Wonderful Life 1993,
  The Desperate Trail 1994,
  Stargate 1994,
  Angels in The Outfield 1994,
  Ready to Wear 1994,
  Drop Zone 1994,
  Fatherland 1994 TV,
  The Pagemaster 1994,
  Don Juan DeMarco 1994,
  The Desperate Trail 1994,
  Tex Chainsaw Massacre: The Next Generation 1994,
  Sensation 1994,
  Ed Wood 1994,
  Timecop 1994,
  Flashfire 1994,
  Love & a 45 1994,
  Sleep with Me 1994,
  Men of War 1994,
  The Glass Shield 1994,
  Wagons East 1994
  Andre 1994,
  Parallel Lives 1994 TV,
  Corrina, Corrina 1994,
  In The Army Now 1994,
  The Little Racals 1994,
  Getting Even with Dad 1994,
  Police Academy: Mission to Moscow 1994,
  Picture Bride 1994,
  With Honors 1994,
  Brainscan 1994,
  The Man Who Wouldn't Die 1994 TV,
  Guyver: Dark Hero 1994,
  Every Breath 1994,
  The Cheat 1994,
  Blue Chips 1994,
  Save Me 1994,
  Hellbound 1994,
  Reality Bites 1994,
  Jumanji 1995,
  Cyber Bits 1995,
  Cino 1995,
  Money Train 1995,
  Mallrats 1995,
  Now and Then 1995,
  Devil in a Blue Dress 1995,
  Se7en 1995
  Voices 1995,
  Crying Freeman 1995,
  The Crossing Guard 1995,
  The Tuskegee Airmen 1995 TV,
  Dangerous Minds 1995,
  Mortal Kombat 1995,
  First Knight 1995,
  Species 1995,
  Judge Dredd 1995,
  Delta of Venus 1995,
  Out-of-Sync 1995,
  To Die For 1995,
  Crimson Tide 1995,
  Gordy 1995,
  If Someone Had Known 1995 TV,
  The Cure 1995,
  Johnny Mnemonic 1995,
  Stuart Saves His Family 1995,
  Bad Boys 1995,
  Kingfish: A Story of Huey P Long 1995
  The Good Old Boys 1995 TV,
  The Quick and The Dead 1995,
  My Family 1995,
  Rumble in The Bronx 1995,
  Bad 1995,
  Tales from The Crypt: Demon Knight 1995,
  Higher Learning 1995,
  Coldblooded 1995,
  Judgement 1995,
  Cutthroat Island 1995,
  Now and Then 1995,
  The Crossing Guard 1995,
  Operation Dumbo Drop 1995,
  The Phantom 1996,
  The Sunchaser 1996,
  Mystery Science Theater 3000: The Movie 1996,
  In Cold Blood 1996,
  To Gillian on Her 37th Birthday 1996,
  Last Man Sting 1996,
  Maximum Risk 1996,
  Albino Alligator 1996,
  Fly Away Home 1996,
  Bound 1996,
  Bastard Out of Carolina 1996,
  Alaska 1996,
  The Fan 1996,
  Matilda 1996,
  Kingpin 1996,
  Multiplicity 1996,
  The Phantom 1996,
  Original Gangsters 1996,
  The Great White Hype 1996,
  Mrs. Winterbourne 1996,
  All Dogs Go to Heaven 2 1996,
  If Lucy Fell 1996,
  Down Periscope 1996,
  Unforgettable 1996,
  Adrenalin: Fear
  The Rush 1996,
  The Juror 1996,
  Bed of Roses 1996,
  Ed's Next Move 1996,
  From Dusk Till Dawn 1996,
  For Love Alone: The Ivana Trump Story 1996
  Citizen Ruth 1996,
  Bliss 1997,
  Fools Rush In 1997,
  Gridlock'd 1997,
  Love! Valour! Compassion! 1997,
  Meet Wally Sparks 1997,
  This World, Then The Fireworks 1997,
  Weapons of Mass Distraction 1997 TV,
  Nowhere 1997,
  Snow White: A Tale of Terror 1997,
  The Fifth Element 1997,
  Breakdown 1997,
  Truth or Consequences, NM 1997,
  Double Team 1997,
  That Old Feeling 1997,
  B*A*P*S 1997,
  The Devil's Own 1997,
  Brittle Glory 1997,
  Soul Food 1997,
  Masterminds 1997,
  Money Talks 1997,
  Air Force One 1997,
  My Best Friend's Wedding 1997,
  Clockwatchers 1997,
  Buddy 1997,
  Trial and Error 1997,
  Address Unknown 1997,
  Breast Men 1997 TV,
  The Eighteenth Angel 1997,
  Good Will Hunting 1997,
  Dust 1997,
  Cold Around The Heart 1997,
  Chicago Cab 1997,
  My BroTher Jack 1997,
  Déjà Vu 1997,
  I Know What You Did Last Summer 1997,
  Gattaca 1997,
  The Thin Red Line 1998,
  Stepmom 1998,
  Star Trek: Insurrection 1998,
  Psycho 1998,
  Ringmaster 1998,
  I Still Know What You Did Last Summer 1998,
  Brown's Requiem 1998,
  Winchell 1998 TV,
  Best of The Best 4 1998,
  Without Warning 1998,
  Dollar for The Dead 1998 TV,
  Zack and Reba 1998,
  Candle Smoke 1998,
  Clay Pigeons 1998,
  A Simple Plan 1998,
  With Friends Like These 1998,
  Apt Pupil 1998,
  Blade 1998
  Bela Donna 1998,
  The Mark of Zorro 1998
  Dennis The Menace Strikes Again! 1998,
  The Patriot 1998,
  The X Files 1998,
  Heaven or Vegas 1998,
  Can't Hardly Wait 1998,
  Phoenix 1998,
  The Truman Show 1998,
  Godzilla 1998,
  The Brave Little Toddler Goes to Mars 1998,
  The Horse Whisperer 1998,
  Body Count 1998,
  The Big Hit 1998,
  Shadrach 1998,
  Wild Things 1998,
  The Man in The Iron Mask 1998,
  Palmetto 1998,
  Gia 1998 TV,
  A Price Above Rubies 1998,
  Two for Texas 1998 TV,
  Wicked 1998,
  Polish Wedding 1998,
  The Replacement Killers 1998,
  Firestorm 1998,
  In Quiet Night 1998,
  Palmetto 1998,
  Desperate Measures 1998,
  Girl Interrupted 1999,
  Children of The Struggle 1999
  Blue Streak 1999,
  Jakob The Liar 1999,
  The Adventures of Elmo in Grouch 1999,
  Freeway II: Confessions of a Trick baby 1999,
  Crazy in Alabama 1999,
  The Bone Collector 1999,
  Twin Falls Idaho 1999,
  Muppets from Space1999,
  Universal Soldier: The Return 1999,
  Big Daddy 1999,
  Idle Hands 1999,
  Election 1999,
  Friends and Lovers 1999,
  Go 1999,
  The Out-of-Towners 1999,
  8MM 1999,
  Kill The Man 1999,
  Varsity Blues 1999,
  Bingo 1999,
  Simon Sez 1999,
  Crazy in Alabama 1999,
  Universal Soldier: The Return 1999,
  My Teacher's Wife 1999,
  Arlington Road 1999,
  The Sky Is Falling 1999.
- 2000s
  Boys Life 3 2000,
  Mission: Impossible II 2000,
  Slow Burn 2000,
  Duets 2000,
  The Patriot 2000,
  The Last Patrol 2000,
  Rules of Engagement 2000.

== 44th Academy Awards Oscar winner ==
- 1971: To Producers Service Corporation and Consolidated Film Industries; and to Cinema Research Corporation and Research Products, Inc. for the engineering and implementation of fully automated blow-up motion picture printing systems, was presented the: Technical Achievement Award (Class III)

== See also ==
- Consolidated Film Industries
