= Earl Bellamy =

American film director

- Born: Earl Arthur Bellamy; March 11, 1917; Minneapolis, Minnesota, US
- Died: November 30, 2003 (aged 86); Albuquerque, New Mexico, US
- Occupation: Director
- Years active: 1953–1991

Earl Arthur Bellamy (March 11, 1917 – November 30, 2003) was an American television and film director.

== Biography ==
Bellamy was born in Minneapolis, Minnesota. He was also known as Earl J. Bellamy, or Earl J. Bellamy, Jr. His father was Richard James Bellamy. He moved to Hollywood in 1920 with his parents; his father was a railroad engineer. After graduating from Hollywood High School in 1935, Bellamy received a degree from Los Angeles City College and took a job as a messenger for Columbia Studios. Within four years, Bellamy had worked his way up to second assistant director before taking time off to serve in the U.S. Navy's photographic unit during World War II.

When Bellamy returned to Hollywood, he became a well-respected TV director who was particularly adept at Westerns. Although he directed nearly two dozen feature films, Bellamy was best known for his work on The Lone Ranger, Sergeant Preston of the Yukon, Rawhide, The Adventures of Rin Tin Tin, The Virginian, Perry Mason’’ and Tales of Wells Fargo.

Family fare was his forte in the 1950s. He directed shows like Jungle Jim, Lassie, Leave It to Beaver and The Donna Reed Show. In the 1960s, he focused on sitcoms like Bachelor Father, Get Smart, The Andy Griffith Show, The Munsters, McHale's Navy, and the final season of My Three Sons. Medical dramas, like Marcus Welby, M.D. and Trapper John, M.D., as well as sitcoms such as M*A*S*H and The San Pedro Beach Bums, kept him busy in the 1970s. Before retiring in 1986, Bellamy directed the science fiction miniseries, V, and many episodes of Fantasy Island and Hart to Hart.

After his retirement, Bellamy and his wife moved to New Mexico. The state had provided him with many different filming locations.

In 2002, the Motion Picture and Television Fund gave him the prestigious Golden Boot Award.

Bellamy died on November 30, 2003, in Albuquerque, New Mexico, at the age of 86. It is reported that he died of a myocardial infarction (heart attack).

== Personal life ==
He had three children, Michael, Earl Jr, and Karen. His first wife died 9 years after Earl Jr was born. His second wife (mother of Karen) committed suicide.

== Films ==
- Sidewinder 1 (1977) director
- Speedtrap (1977) director
- Against a Crooked Sky (1975) director
- Walking Tall Part 2 (1975) director
- Sidecar Racers (1975) director
- Seven Alone (1974) director
- Backtrack! (1969) director
- Incident at Phantom Hill (1966) director
- Munster, Go Home! (1966) director
- Gunpoint (1966) director
- Fluffy (1965) director
- Stagecoach to Dancers' Rock (1962) director
- Toughest Gun in Tombstone (1958) director
- Blackjack Ketchum, Desperado (1956) director
- Seminole Uprising (1955) director
- A Star Is Born (1954) assistant director
- It Should Happen to You (1954) assistant director
- From Here to Eternity (1953) assistant director
- Shockproof (1949) assistant director

== Television ==
- Alfred Hitchcock Presents Role: Director
- The Andy Griffith Show Role: Director
- Bachelor Father Role: Director
- The Brian Keith Show Role: Director of some episodes
- CHiPs Role: Director
- The Castaways on Gilligan's Island (TV movie) Role: Director
- Code Red Role: Director
- Crusader Role: Director
- Daniel Boone Role: Director
- Desilu Playhouse Role: Director
- The Desperate Mission (TV movie) Role: Director
- Desperate Women (TV movie) Role: Director
- Eight Is Enough, season 3, episode 17: "Mother's Rule", Role: Director
- The F.B.I. Role: Director
- Fantasy Island Role: Director
- Fire! (TV movie) Role: Director
- Flood! (TV movie) Role: Director
- Future Cop Role: Director
- Get Smart Role: Director
- Hart to Hart Role: Director, Writer
- I Spy Role: Director
- Isis Role: Director
- The John Forsythe Show Role: Director
- Knight in Shining Armour (TV special) Role: Director
- Laramie Role: Director
- Laredo Role: Director
- Leave It to Beaver Role: Director
- The Lone Ranger Role: Director
- M Squad Role: Director
- M*A*S*H Role: Director
- Masquerade (TV movie) Role: Director
- Matt Helm Role: Director
- McHale's Navy Role: Director
- Medical Center Role: Director
- The Mod Squad Role: Director
- The Munsters Role: Director
- My Three Sons Role: Director
- O'Connor's Ocean (TV special) Role: Director
- Partners (TV series) Role: Director
- Perry Mason Role: Director
- The Pigeon (TV movie) Role: Director
- The Quest Role: Director
- Rawhide Role: Director
- The Restless Gun Role: Director of some episodes
- S.W.A.T. Role: Director
- The San Pedro Beach Bums Role: Director
- Sixth Sense (TV series) Role: Director
- Starsky and Hutch Role: Director
- Stranded (TV special) Role: Director
- To Rome with Love Role: Director
- The Trackers (TV movie) Role: Director
- Trapper John, M.D. Role: Director
- U.S. Marshal Role: Director 2 episodes
- Valentine Magic on Love Island (TV movie) Role: Director
- Wagon Train Role: Director
- Young Dan'l Boone Role: Director
- Tales of Wells Fargo Role: Director
