= Spoilers of the Forest =

1957 film by Joseph Kane

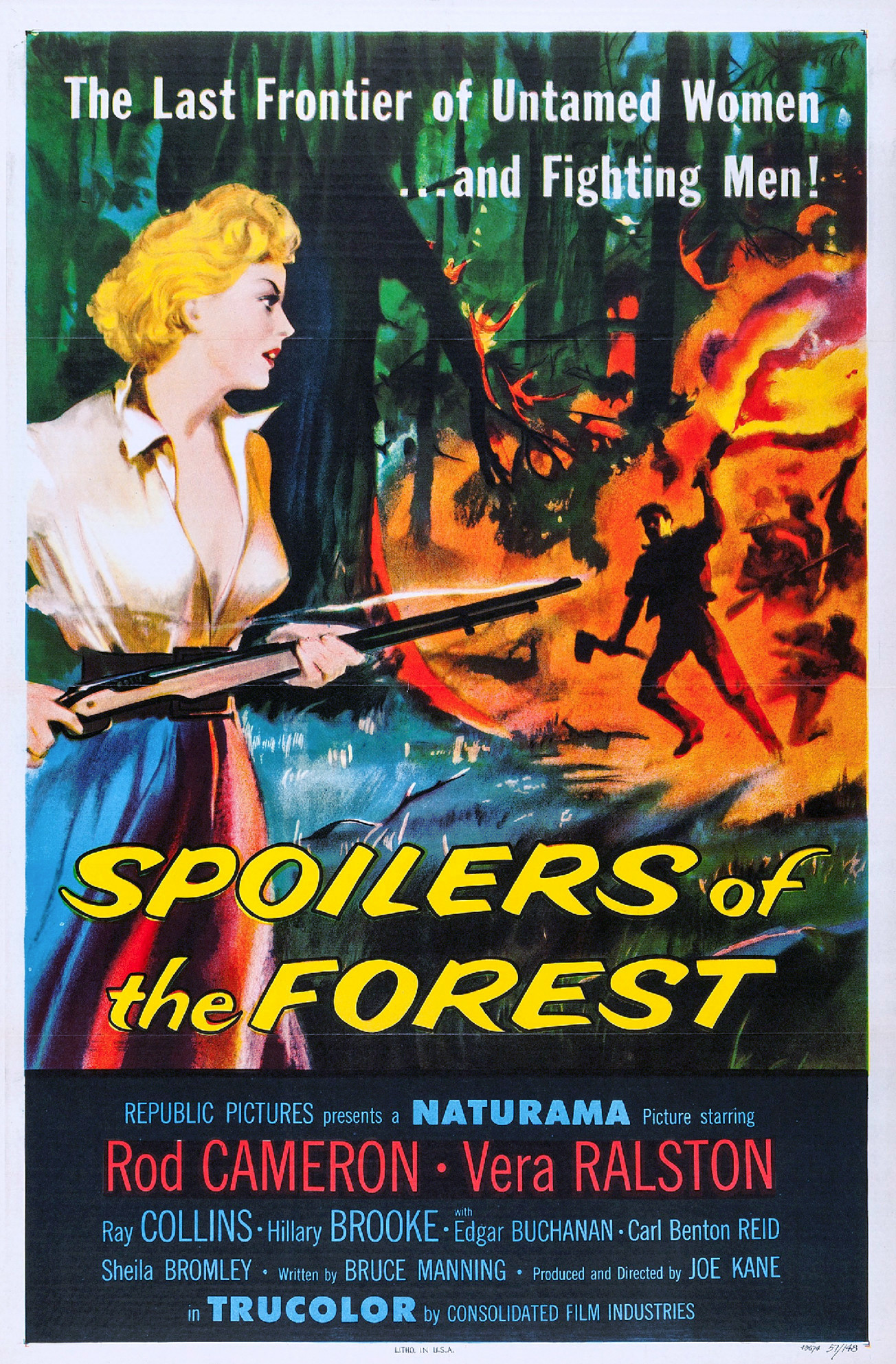
- Theatrical release poster
- Directed by: Joseph Kane
- Screenplay by: Bruce Manning
- Produced by: Joseph Kane
- Starring: Rod Cameron; Vera Ralston; Ray Collins; Hillary Brooke; Edgar Buchanan; Carl Benton Reid
- Cinematography: Jack A. Marta
- Edited by: Richard L. Van Enger
- Production company: Republic Pictures
- Distributed by: Republic Pictures
- Release date: April 5, 1957
- Running time: 68 minutes
- Country: United States
- Language: English

Spoilers of the Forest is a 1957 American Western film directed by Joseph Kane, written by Bruce Manning, and starring Rod Cameron, Vera Ralston, Ray Collins, Hillary Brooke, Edgar Buchanan and Carl Benton Reid. It was released on April 5, 1957 by Republic Pictures.

This was the final film shot in Trucolor.

== Cast ==
- Rod Cameron as Boyd Caldwell
- Vera Ralston as Joan Milna
- Ray Collins as Eric Warren
- Hillary Brooke as Phyllis Warren
- Edgar Buchanan as Tom Duncan
- Carl Benton Reid as John Mitchell
- Sheila Bromley as Linda Mitchell
- Hank Worden as Pat Casey
- John Compton as Billy Mitchell
- John Alderson as Big Jack Milna
- Angela Greene as Camille
- Paul Stader as Dan
- Mary Alan Hokanson as Marie Milna
- Raymond Greenleaf as Clyde Walters
- Eleanor Audley as Mrs. Walters
