= George Moskov =

Russian-born ilm writer and director (1893–1970)

George G. Moskov, last name sometimes spelled Moscov, (1893–1970), was a production manager, producer, director, and writer of films in the U.S. He wrote Three Blondes in His Life (1961), directed Married Too Young (1962), and produced or served as production manager for over 30 films, including Charlie Chan in the Secret Service (1944), Joe Palooka, Champ (1946), The Prairie (1947), Champagne for Caesar (1950), Chained for Life (1951), and That Tender Touch (1969).

He was from Kharkov, Russian Empire (now Ukraine).

In 1945 he announced the formation of a new film company. George Moskov Productions was to produce the film Woman of Montmartre.

He was also associated with the company Appalo Pictures with Raoul Pago.

Moskov advised Philip Yordan how to meet budgetary constraints with his film The Unknown Guest (1943).

In 1947, he filed suit for $75,000 against independent producer Hal Chester for breach of contract on two Joe Palooka films. Moskov claimed that Chester had paid him neither salary nor percentage for Moskov's work as production manager and associate producer.

A Boxoffice review of his film Three Blondes in His Life (1961) described his production as not "particularly inspired".

Moskov's wife divorced him in 1950. Moskov died in 1970; at the time of his death, he had a wife named Zina and two children.

== Partial filmography ==
- When Strangers Marry (1944), story
- Charlie Chan in the Secret Service (1944), assistant director
- Heading for Heaven (1947), producer
- Lighthouse (1947), producer
- Blonde Ice (1948), production manager
- Smooth Fingers (1950), producer
- Champagne for Caesar (1950), producer
- Chained for Life (1951), producer
- The Hoodlum Priest (1961), production supervisor
- Three Blondes in His Life (1961), writer and producer
- Married Too Young (1962), director
