= The Son of Dr. Jekyll =

1951 American film by Seymour Friedman

- Theatrical release poster
- Directed by: Seymour Friedman
- Story by: Mortimer Braus; Jack Pollexfen; Edward Huebsch
- Starring: Louis Hayward; Jody Lawrance; Alexander Knox
- Cinematography: Henry Freulich
- Edited by: Gene Havlick
- Music by: Paul Sawtell
- Production company: Columbia Pictures
- Distributed by: Columbia Pictures
- Release date: October 31, 1951
- Running time: 78 minutes
- Country: United States
- Language: English

The Son of Dr. Jekyll is a 1951 American horror film directed by Seymour Friedman and starring Louis Hayward, Jody Lawrance and Alexander Knox. The film is a continuation of Robert Louis Stevenson's original classic 1886 novella Strange Case of Dr. Jekyll and Mr. Hyde.

According to screenwriter Jack Pollexfen, he and Mortimer Brass came up with a premise after initially discussing outlandish film titles. He wrote and produced a sequel in the same vein, Daughter of Dr. Jekyll (1957), starring Gloria Talbott.

== Plot ==
In 1860, Mr. Edward Hyde is pursued through the streets of London after murdering his wife at their Soho flat. He escapes to the house of Dr. Henry Jekyll, where he prepares the potion that will transform him back to the respected doctor. However, the mob has already set the house ablaze. The flames drive Hyde to the top floor, and in an attempt to leap to the ground, he is killed when he falls to the ground. As he dies, he reverts to Dr. Jekyll.

John Utterson and Dr. Curtis Lanyon mourn their friend until Inspector Stoddard brings them to the flat, where Jekyll/Hyde has left an orphan. Utterson agrees to adopt the young Jekyll, as he and his wife have no children. Thirty years later, Edward Jekyll, now fiancé to Utterson's niece Lynn and a student of the Royal Academy of Sciences, is expelled because of his peculiar and unorthodox experiments. Edward is unaware that he is actually Henry Jekyll's son, and when he inherits the Jekyll mansion, Dr. Lanyon recounts his father's tragic story.

Edward and Lynn move to the old Jekyll mansion to prepare for their marriage, but Edward feels unwelcome by his neighbors. Discovering his father's laboratory, he resolves to work on his father's experiments to clear the family name. He hires Michaels, Dr. Jekyll's old assistant, and begins researching. After Edward tests the formula on himself, a Hyde-like man appears in the house and murders a number of people. Edward is charged for the murders and, believed to be insane, is transferred to Dr. Lanyon's sanitarium, where the murders continue. Edward wonders whether it is he who transforms into a murderer or if someone is trying to drive him to insanity. Edward comes up with a plan to draw out his suspicions which leads to a fiery confrontation with Dr. Lanyon and the truth of the manuscript involving that fateful night in 1860.

== Cast ==
- Louis Hayward as Edward Jekyll / Dr. Henry Jekyll and Mr. Edward Hyde
- Jody Lawrance as Lynn Utterson
- Alexander Knox as Dr. Curtis Lanyon
- Lester Matthews as Sir John Utterson
- Gavin Muir as Richard Daniels
- Paul Cavanagh as Inspector Stoddard
- Rhys Williams as Michaels
