= Carl Benton Reid =

American actor (1893–1973)

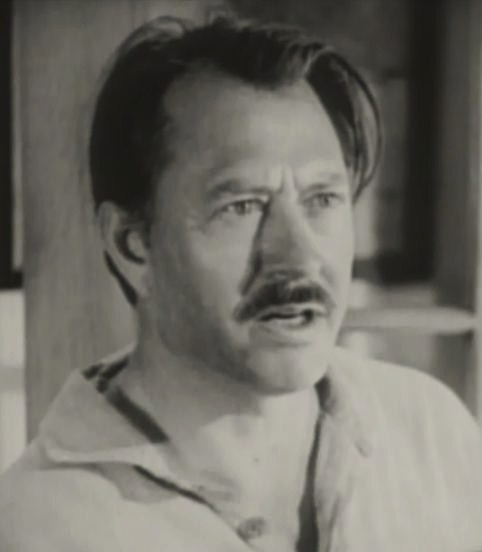
- Carl Benton Reid in The North Star (1943)
- Born: August 14, 1893; Lansing, Michigan, U.S.
- Died: March 16, 1973 (aged 79); Hollywood, California, U.S.
- Education: Battle Creek High School; Carnegie Tech (AB)
- Occupation: Actor
- Years active: 1929–1949 (stage); 1940–1966 (film)
- Spouses: Florence E. LaPointe (m. 1924; div. 1933); Hazel Harrison (m. 1941)
- Children: 1 daughter

Carl Benton Reid (August 14, 1893 – March 16, 1973) was an American actor.

== Early years ==
Born in Lansing, Michigan and raised in Battle Creek, Reid was the son of Jesse (née Hawkins) and Benjamin Franklin Reid. He attended Battle Creek High School (class of 1912), and it was there, beginning in 1910, that a drama class taught by newly hired U-M alumnus and Paw Paw native Carlos Cole ignited Reid's interest in an acting career. (Note: This highly fortuitous connection proved short-lived. By the fall of 1912, Cole had contracted pneumonia, and on June 18, 1914, scarcely two years after his high school graduation, Reid, along with a fellow alumnus, was attending the funeral of a much-loved mentor and very dear friend, dead at the age of 26.)

Reid graduated from Carnegie Tech with an A. B. degree and was a member of Delta Upsilon fraternity there.

== Career ==
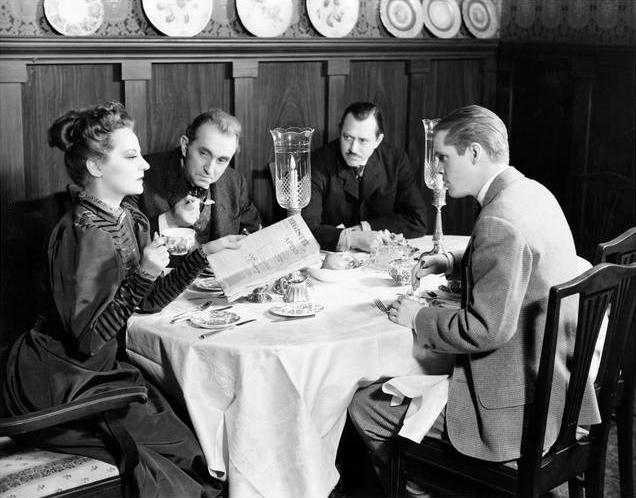
Tallulah Bankhead, Charles Dingle, Carl Benton Reid and Dan Duryea in the original Broadway production of The Little Foxes (1939)

Reid used his full name professionally because when he worked in radio, four other people in the business were named Carl Reid. For seven years, Reid performed in leading-man roles of productions at the Cleveland Play House. He achieved fame on the Broadway stage in 1939 as Oscar Hubbard, one of Regina Giddens's (Tallulah Bankhead) greedy, devious brothers in the play The Little Foxes, and made his film debut reprising his role opposite Bette Davis in the 1941 film version. He also appeared in several Shakespeare plays on Broadway, and in the original production of Eugene O'Neill's The Iceman Cometh, as Harry Slade. His stern, cold demeanor quickly stereotyped him in villainous, and/or unpleasant characters, although he could play a sympathetic role, as he did occasionally in such films as the 1957 TV-movie version of The Pied Piper of Hamelin. Here he played the Mayor of Middelburg, who unsuccessfully requests help from the Mayor of Hamelin (Claude Rains), when Hamelin is the victim of a flood. The flood leads to the famous plague of rats which invade Hamelin, and set the main plot in motion. He played the American Admiral, who is leading the peace talks between the Americans and Chinese during the Korean War in MGM's Pork Chop Hill. His last film role was the judge in Madame X (1966).

On old-time radio, Reid played Roger Allen in the soap opera Big Sister.

On television, Reid had the role of the U.S. spymaster known only as The Man in Amos Burke, Secret Agent. He made four guest appearances on Perry Mason during the show's nine-year run between 1957 and 1966. His final television role was as Claude Townsend in the TV series The F.B.I..

== Personal life ==
On August 16, 1924, Reid married West Bay City native Florence E. LaPointe; they divorced on July 24, 1933. On July 12, 1941, he married actress Hazel Harrison, whom he met at the Cleveland Play House. They had a daughter, Shirley Jane.

== Death ==
On March 16, 1973, Reid died at his home in Studio City, California, at age 79. He was survived by his wife and his daughter.

== Selected filmography ==
- The Little Foxes (1941) as Oscar Hubbard
- Tennessee Johnson (1942) as Congressman Hargrove
- The North Star (1943) as Boris Simonov
- In a Lonely Place (1950) as Captain Lochner
- Convicted (1950) as Captain Douglas
- The Fuller Brush Girl (1950) as Mr. Christy
- The Killer That Stalked New York (1950) as Health Commissioner Ellis
- Stage to Tucson (1950) as Dr. Noah Banteen
- The Flying Missile (1950) as Dr. Gates, USN
- Smuggler's Gold (1951) as 'Pop' Hodges
- The Great Caruso (1951) as Park Benjamin
- Lorna Doone (1951) as Sir Ensor Doone
- Criminal Lawyer (1951) as Tucker Bourne
- The Family Secret (1951) as Dr. Steve Reynolds
- Indian Uprising (1952) as John Clemson
- Boots Malone (1952) as John Williams
- The First Time (1952) as Andrew Bennet
- The Sniper (1952) as Mr. Liddell (uncredited)
- Carbine Williams (1952) as Claude Williams
- The Brigand (1952) as Prime Minister Triano
- The Story of Will Rogers (1952) as Senator Clem Rogers
- Main Street to Broadway (1953) as Judge Robbins in Fantasy Sequence
- Escape from Fort Bravo (1953) as Colonel Owens
- The Command (1954) as Colonel Janeway
- Broken Lance (1954) as Clem Lawton
- The Egyptian (1954) as Senmut
- Athena (1954) as Mr. Griswalde
- Wichita (1955) as Mayor Andrew Hope
- One Desire (1955) as Sen. Kenneth A. Watrous
- The Left Hand of God (1955) as Father Cornelius
- The Spoilers (1955) as Judge Stillman
- A Day of Fury (1956) as Judge John J. McLean
- The First Texan (1956) as President Andrew Jackson (uncredited)
- Strange Intruder (1956) as James Carmichael
- The Last Wagon (1956) as General Howard
- Battle Hymn (1957) as Deacon Edwards
- Spoilers of the Forest (1957) as John Mitchell
- Time Limit (1957) as Lieutenant General J. Connors
- Perry Mason (1958) as Ned Bain
- Tarzan's Fight for Life (1958) as Dr. Sturdy
- The Last of the Fast Guns (1958) as John Forbes
- Have Gun – Will Travel (1959) (Season 1 Episode 24: "Girl from Picadilly") as Martin Westrope
- Gunsmoke (1959) (Season 4 Episode 19: "Passive Resistance") as Gideon Seek
- Bonanza (1959) (Season 1 Episode 11: "The Truckee Strip") as Luther Bishop
- The Trap (1959) as Sheriff Lloyd Anderson
- Pork Chop Hill (1959) as American Admiral at Peace Conference
- The Bramble Bush (1960) as Sam McFie
- The Gallant Hours (1960) as Vice-Admiral Robert Ghormley
- Wagon Train (1960) (Season 3 Episode 22: "The Tracy Sadler Story") as Fletcher Forest
- Lassie (1961) (Season 8 Episode 1: "Lassie and the Grand Canyon") as Richard Bliss
- Bonanza (1962) (Season 3 Episode 33: "The Mountain Girl") as Josiah Parker
- The Underwater City (1962) as Dr. Junius Halstead
- Pressure Point (1962) as Chief Medical Officer
- The Ugly American (1963) as Senator at Confirmation Hearing
- The Andy Griffith Show (1963) (Season 3 Episode 15: "Barney and the Governor") as Governor Ed
- The Alfred Hitchcock Hour (1963) (Season 1 Episode 31: "Run for Doom") as Horace Reed
- The Alfred Hitchcock Hour (1964) (Season 2 Episode 17: "The Jar") as Gramps Medknowe
- The Alfred Hitchcock Hour (1965) (Season 3 Episode 13: "Where the Woodbine Twineth") as Captain King Snyder
- Madame X (1966) as The Judge
