= The Family Secret (1951 film) =

1951 film by Henry Levin

- Theatrical release poster
- Directed by: Henry Levin
- Screenplay by: Francis Cockrell; Andrew Solt
- Story by: Marie Baumer; James Cavanagh
- Produced by: Robert Lord
- Starring: John Derek; Lee J. Cobb; Jody Lawrance; Henry O'Neill
- Cinematography: Burnett Guffey
- Edited by: Al Clark
- Music by: George Duning
- Color process: Black and white
- Production company: Santana Pictures Corporation
- Distributed by: Columbia Pictures
- Release date: October 18, 1951 (Los Angeles)
- Running time: 85 minutes
- Country: United States
- Language: English

The Family Secret is a 1951 American film noir crime film directed by Henry Levin and starring John Derek and Lee J. Cobb.

== Plot ==
Law student David Clark kills best friend Art Bradley in self-defense after an argument. He flees but later confesses to his father Howard, who is a lawyer. The next morning, Howard expects his son provide an explanation to Redman, the district attorney, but instead David merely asks whether he can be of any help after another man, Joe Elsner, is arrested. Elsner is a bookie to whom the Art had owed a debt.

David has always been irresponsible, which is why secretary Lee Pearson continues to resist David's romantic attentions, although she is attracted to him. His parents blame themselves for his immaturity.

Elsner's wife Marie asks Howard to represent her husband in court. David sits by his father's and the defendant's side at the trial. Howard exposes key eyewitness Henry Archer Sims as a convicted perjurer. It seems that Elsner might be found innocent, but the stress causes him to suffer a fatal heart attack. David finally realizes that he must confess and promises Lee that he will lead a better life.

== Cast ==
- John Derek as David Clark
- Lee J. Cobb as Howard Clark
- Jody Lawrance as Lee Pearson
- Erin O'Brien-Moore as Ellen Clark
- Santos Ortega as District Attorney Redman
- Henry O'Neill as Donald Muir
- Carl Benton Reid as Dr. Steve Reynolds
- Peggy Converse as Sybil Bradley
- Jean Alexander as Vera Stone
- Dorothy Tree as Marie Elsner
- Whit Bissell as Joe Elsner
- Raymond Greenleaf as Henry Archer Sims
- Onslow Stevens as Judge Geoffrey N. Williams

== Reception ==
In a contemporary review for the Los Angeles Times, critic John L. Scott wrote: "This soap-opera-type story ... is filled with static situations and much talk. It builds some suspense. ... John Derek portrays a sullen youth whose attitude gains him little sympathy. The role would try many older and more experienced actors. Cobb's characterization is more definite and appealing."
