= Anthony Dexter =

American actor (1913–2001)

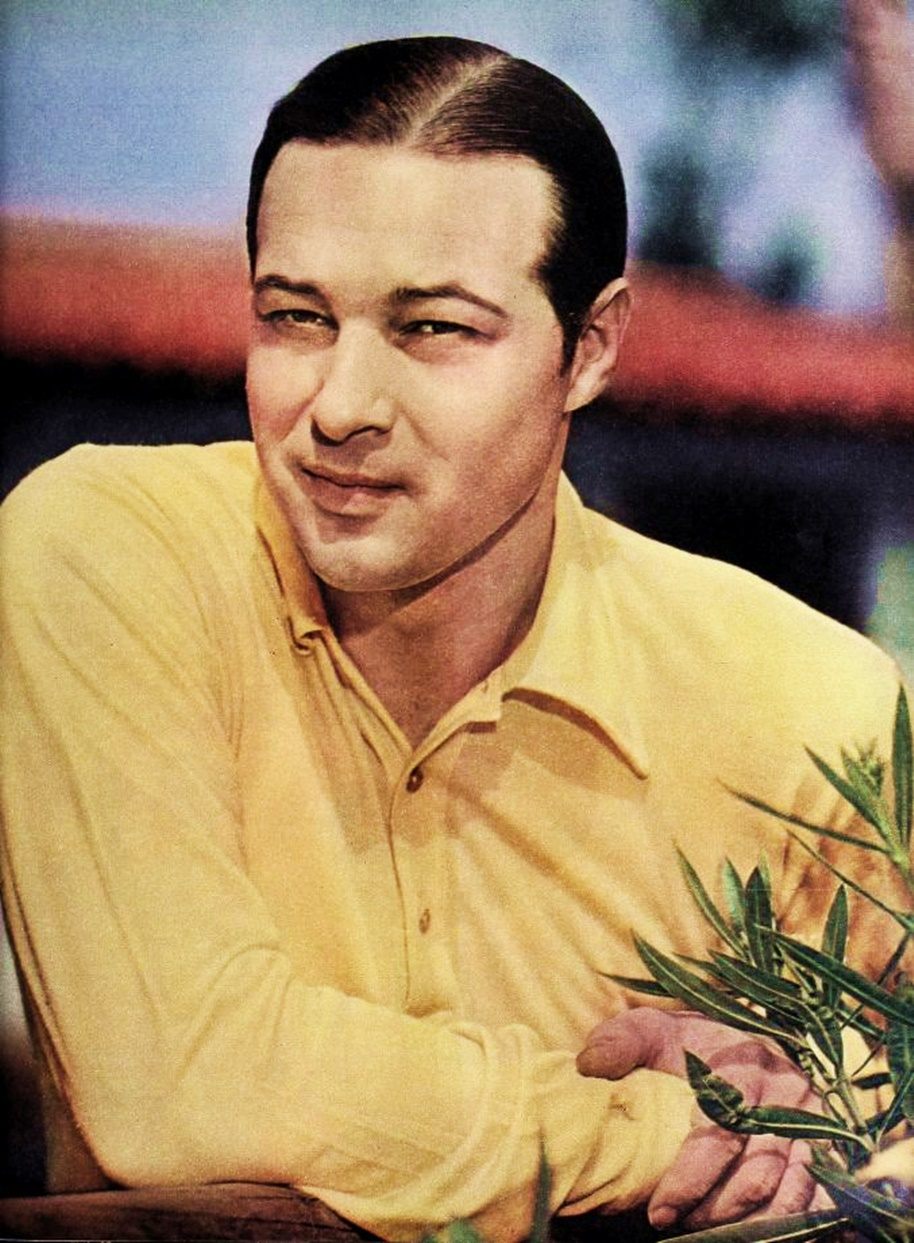
- Anthony in Photoplay Magazine, 1951
- Born: Walter Reinhold Alfred Fleischmann; January 19, 1913; Talmage, Nebraska, U.S.
- Died: March 27, 2001 (aged 88); Greeley, Colorado, U.S.
- Other names: Tony Dexter; Walter Craig
- Education: St. Olaf College; University of Iowa (MA)
- Occupation: Actor
- Years active: 1951–1967

Anthony John Dexter (born Walter Reinhold Alfred Fleischmann, January 19, 1913 – March 27, 2001) was an American actor known for his striking resemblance to silent film hero Rudolph Valentino, whom he portrayed in the 1951 biopic Valentino. Dexter sometimes used the pseudonym Walter Craig. He was known for portraying many real-life characters such as Captain John Smith, Captain William Kidd, Billy the Kid and Christopher Columbus.

== Biography ==
Born Walter Reinhold Alfred Fleischmann in Nebraska, he earned an athletic scholarship to St. Olaf College in Northfield, Minnesota and later earned a Master of Arts from the University of Iowa. During World War II he served in the U.S. Army's Special Services in England earning the rank of Sergeant. After the war he performed on Broadway productions of The Three Sisters, Ah, Wilderness and The Barretts of Wimpole Street.

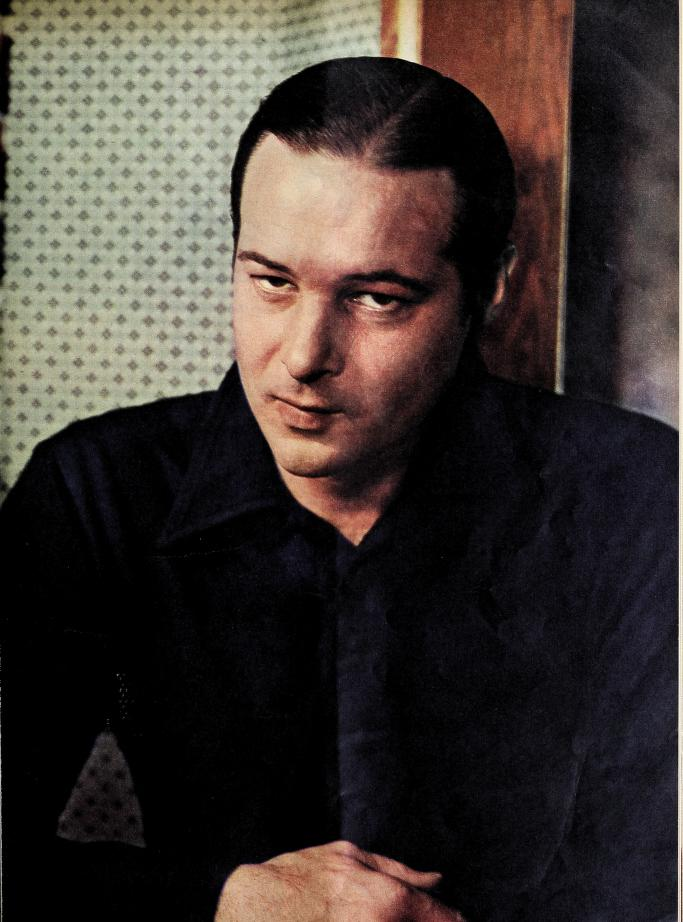
Anthony Dexter in Photoplay, 1951

When preparing a film biography of Rudolph Valentino, Valentino, producer Edward Small chose Dexter for the lead from over 75,000 applicants and 400 screen tests. His incredible likeness to Valentino led to a contract with Columbia Pictures, but hampered him in achieving substantial film roles. When Dexter broke his contract with Edward Small due to the producer wanting to use him exclusively in Valentino-type roles, Dexter soon found that other producers wished him to do the same - for less money. He also made three unsuccessful television pilots, two of them swashbucklers.

In 1960, guest starred on Gene Barry's TV Western Bat Masterson, playing a large and rare role as the episode long sidekick to Bat Masterson, Allesandro Valin in S2E35's "The Big Gamble".

After his movie career ended, Dexter, now known as Walter Craig, taught high school English, speech, and drama classes at Eagle Rock High School (circa 1968–1978) in the Los Angeles area. When he retired from teaching, Craig moved to Greeley, Colorado, where he lived until his death on March 27, 2001. He had two daughters, Kimberly and Claudia.

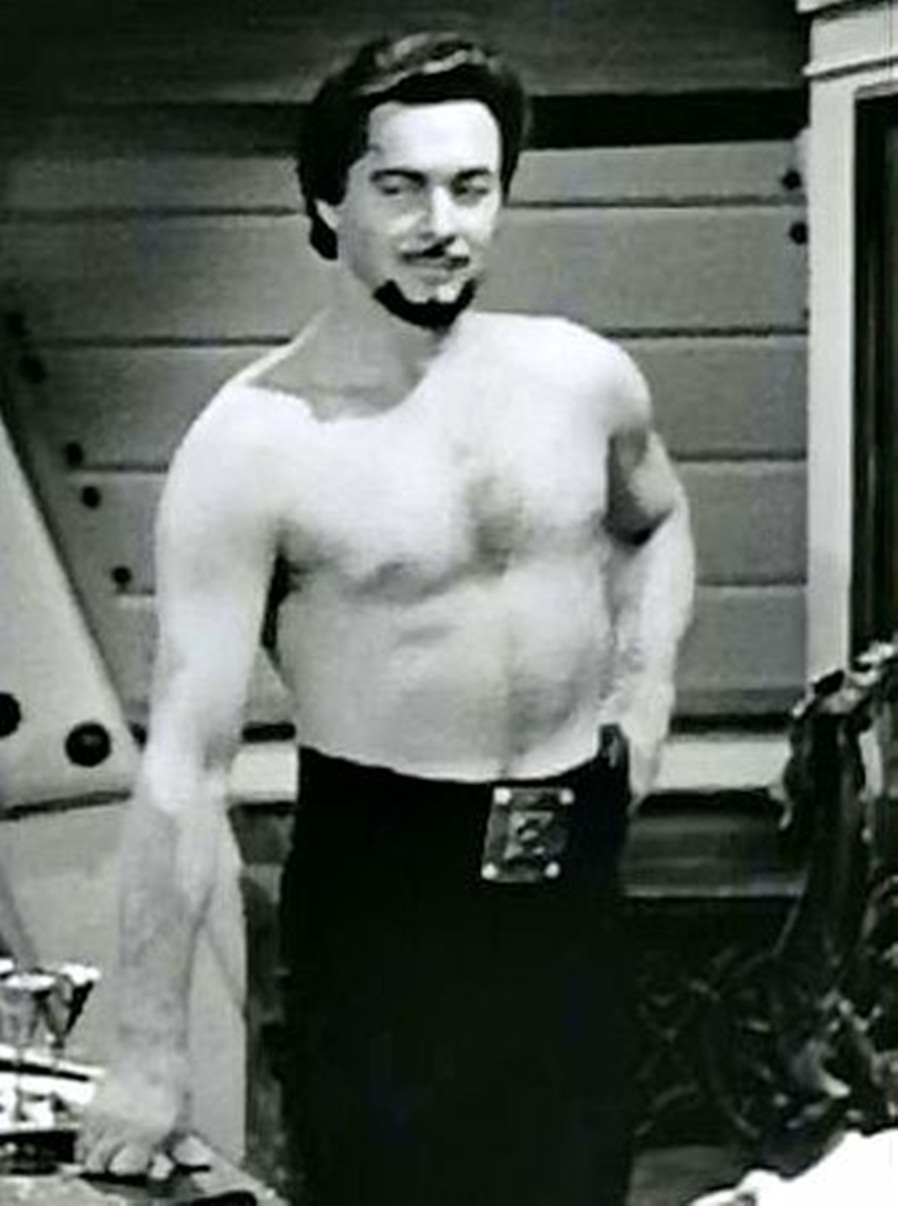
Anthony Dexter in Captain Kidd and the Slave Girl

== Filmography ==
Year	Title	Role	Notes
1950	Side Street	Radio Clerk	Uncredited
1951	Valentino	Rudolph Valentino	
1952	The Brigand	Carlos Delargo / King Lorenzo III	
1953	Captain John Smith and Pocahontas	Captain John Smith	
1954	Captain Kidd and the Slave Girl	Captain William Kidd	
1954	The Black Pirates	Capt. Zargo	
1956	Fire Maidens of Outer Space	Luther Blair	
1956	He Laughed Last	Dominic Rodriguez	
1957	The Parson and the Outlaw	Billy The Kid	
1957	The Story of Mankind	Christopher Columbus	
1960	12 to the Moon	Dr. Luis Vargas	
1961	Three Blondes in His Life	Charlie Walsh	
1961	The Phantom Planet	Herron	
1962	Married Too Young	Lech	
1965	Saturday Night Bath in Apple Valley		
1967	Thoroughly Modern Millie	Juarez	

== Television ==
Year	Title	Role	Notes
1959	Rawhide	Chie	S2:E16, "Incident of the Tinker's Dam"
