= Jody Lawrance =

American actress (1930–1986)

- Born: Nona Josephine Goddard; October 19, 1930; Fort Worth, Texas, U.S.
- Died: July 10, 1986 (aged 55); Ventura, California, U.S.
- Resting place: Ashes sprinkled within Ojai Valley in California
- Occupation: Actress
- Years active: 1949–1962
- Spouses: Bruce Michael Tilton (m. 1957; div. 1958) Robert Wolf Herre (m. 1962)
- Children: 3

Jody Lawrance (born Nona Josephine Goddard; October 19, 1930 – July 10, 1986) was an American actress who starred in many Hollywood films during the 1950s through the early 1960s.

== Biography ==
Lawrance was born on October 19, 1930 as Nona Josephine Goddard or Josephine Lawrence Goddard (sources disagree) in Fort Worth, Texas to Ervin Silliman "Doc" and Eleanor Roeck Goddard. Her parents divorced when she was very young, and she lived in a series of foster homes as a child.

When Lawrance came to live with her father and his new wife at the age of 11, a young Marilyn Monroe, then known by her real name of Norma Jean Baker, also lived at the home. The girls spent a great deal of time together.

Lawrance attended Beverly Hills High School and Hollywood Professional School, training as an actress with Bento Schneider. In 1946, Lawrance performed as a swimmer in the Larry Crosby Water Show.

In 1949, she adopted the screen name Jody (short for Josephine) Lawrance (her maternal grandmother's maiden name) for her first role as Mary on The Silver Theatre television show.

Her first big break came in 1949 when she was signed to a seven-year contract with Columbia Pictures, earning $250 per week. In 1951, Lawrance made her screen debut in Mask of the Avenger, starring John Derek. The Family Secret was her second film, again starring Derek along with Lee J. Cobb, followed by Ten Tall Men starring Burt Lancaster, which premiered in October 1951.

In 1952, she won the lead role in The Son of Dr. Jekyll with Louis Hayward and The Brigand starring Anthony Dexter. In 1953, Columbia asked Lawrance to appear in the musical All Ashore with Mickey Rooney. Unsure of her singing ability, Lawrance asked to be replaced by another actress who would be better suited for the role. Columbia refused and Lawrance reluctantly made the film, but the studio branded her as a troublemaker, and in 1953 she was released from her contract.

Lawrance took the role of Pocahontas in the controversial independent film Captain John Smith and Pocahontas. For the role, she dyed her hair black and suffered a severe allergic reaction. She is billed with the last name of Lawrence for the film, but it is unknown whether this was because of contractual obligations or simply a spelling mistake. In 1954, needing money, Lawrance took a job as a waitress at Robb's Restaurant in the Westwood district of Los Angeles and Blum's Ice Cream and Candy Shop in Beverly Hills. When asked in an interview why her career failed, she explaineds, "I see now that I was temperamental. I didn't cooperate with publicity. I didn't want to do cheesecake, not because my legs are bad, because they aren't. My entire training has been as an actress, I didn't want to submit to the usual starlet routine. .... If I had to do it over again, I would do it differently. I realize now that cheesecake and publicity are an important part of the movie business."

After recognizing Lawrance at the restaurant, former costar Burt Lancaster introduced her to director Michael Curtiz, who offered her a screen test and cast her in the 1956 film The Scarlet Hour. Lawrance's career was reignited and Paramount Pictures signed her to a contract at $300 a week. In October, Lawrance was named as one of the "Deb Stars of '55" along with Anita Ekberg and Kathryn Grant, and 1956 brought the release of The Leather Saint, reuniting her with John Derek and starring Cesar Romero.

However, in 1957, Paramount suddenly released Lawrance from her contract after studio executives learned that she had secretly married and was pregnant. Her daughter Victoria was born on October 6, 1957. The marriage ended in 1958.

Lawrance landed a minor role opposite Shirley MacLaine in Hot Spell and a leading role in an episode of the Perry Mason television series titled "Case of the Perjured Parrot." In 1959, she found another minor role in the mobster film The Purple Gang starring Barry Sullivan and Robert Blake. She appeared in episodes of television programs such as The Loretta Young Show, The Red Skelton Hour and The Rebel. Her last film, Stagecoach to Dancers' Rock starring Martin Landau, was released in 1962.

Lawrance married Robert Wolf Herre on November 1, 1962, in Las Vegas. Lawrance had two children with Herre. She died at age 55 at the Ventura County Medical Center in Ventura, California on July 10, 1986. Her body was cremated.

== Filmography ==
| Year | Title | Role | Notes |
|---|---|---|---|
| 1949 | The Silver Theater | Mary | Episode: "The Guiding Star" |
| 1951 | Mask of the Avenger | Maria d'Orsini | |
| 1951 | The Family Secret | Lee Pearson | |
| 1951 | Ten Tall Men | Mahla | |
| 1951 | The Son of Dr. Jekyll | Lynn Utterson | |
| 1952 | The Brigand | Princess Teresa | |
| 1953 | All Ashore | Nancy Flynn | |
| 1953 | Captain John Smith and Pocahontas | Pocahontas | (as Jody Lawrence) |
| 1953-1955 | Fireside Theater | Adelina / Artist | Episodes: "The Critic" (1953) and "Bitter Grapes" (1955) |
| 1956 | The Scarlet Hour | Kathy Stevens | |
| 1956 | The Leather Saint | Pearl Gorman | |
| 1957 | The Millionaire | Peggy | Episode: "The Jim Driskill Story" |
| 1958 | Hot Spell | Dora May | |
| 1958 | Perry Mason | Ellen Monteith | Episode: "The Case of the Perjured Parrot" |
| 1959 | State Trooper | Patty Roberts | Episode: "Let 'Em Eat Smoke" |
| 1959 | M Squad | Rebecca Traxler | Episode: "Murder in C-Sharp Minor" |
| 1959 | The Purple Gang | Joan MacNamara | |
| 1960 | Letter to Loretta | Miss Vivan | Episode: "Mrs. Minton" |
| 1959-1960 | The Rebel | Lorena / Kate | Episodes: "The Scavengers" (1959) and "The Earl of Durango" (1960) |
| 1962 | Stagecoach to Dancers' Rock | Dr. Ann Thompson | |
