= Stagecoach to Dancers' Rock =

1962 film by Earl Bellamy

- Theatrical release poster
- Directed by: Earl Bellamy
- Screenplay by: Keneth Darling
- Story by: Keneth Darling
- Produced by: Earl Bellamy
- Starring: Warren Stevens; Martin Landau; Jody Lawrance; Judy Dan; Don Wilbanks; Del Moore; Robert Anderson
- Cinematography: Eddie Fitzgerald
- Edited by: Buddy Small
- Music by: Franz Steininger
- Production company: Gray-Mac Productions
- Distributed by: Universal Pictures
- Release date: October 1, 1962
- Running time: 72 minutes
- Country: United States
- Language: English

Stagecoach to Dancers' Rock is a 1962 American Western film directed by Earl Bellamy, written by Keneth Darling, and starring Warren Stevens, Martin Landau, Jody Lawrance, Judy Dan, Don Wilbanks, Del Moore and Robert Anderson. It was released on October 1, 1962, by Universal Pictures.

== Plot ==
In 1873, a stagecoach pulls into Tucson, Arizona. The passengers are U. S. Cavalry Maj. John Southern, Ann Thompson, a woman on her way to San Francisco to study medicine, and Indian agent Hiram Best. In Tucson they pick up gambler Dade Coleman and Loi Yan Wu, a young Chinese-American woman who is on her way to San Francisco to work as a librarian. At a stop for food, the stage adds a sixth passenger – gunslinger Jess Dollard.

Following the food stop, Loi Yan Wu becomes ill. Her illness is diagnosed by Ann as chicken pox, but the driver and guard believe it to be smallpox. Realizing they've all been exposed, they continue their journey, but the driver and guard plot to abandon the passengers. Stopping in the middle of the desert, the driver and guard claim to be resting the horses, but when most of the passengers are out of the coach, they take off and leave them. Best, the Indian agent, stays in the coach.

The five passengers set out on foot, with John Southern carrying the stricken Loi Yan Wu. They spend the night in the desert and are able to get food and water from some plants they find. They travel on, weaker and weaker, and then see the stagecoach ahead of them. As they get closer, they see that the driver, guard and Hiram Best have been killed by Apaches, who took the horses and the men's guns. They bury the men and camp out around the stage.

Coleman finds a canteen of water and hoards it, but Dollard sees him sneaking a drink from it and takes the canteen to share with the others. That night Coleman steals Dollard's gun and a knife Dollard had given to Ann. When Southern tries to attack him, Coleman kills Southern and then wounds Dollard. He then forces Ann under the stage, where she and Loi Yan Wu had been sleeping, and rapes her.

Dollard is nursed back to health by Loi Yan Wu while Coleman forces Ann to be his servant. Eventually Coleman sends Dollard and Loi Yan Wu away, telling them to walk into the desert. They go a little ways off and wait for Coleman to weaken, as Ann has confided to them that Coleman now has chicken pox. But before that can happen, they all see a stagecoach approaching. Coleman realizes that it's the stage to Tucson, and that if he and Ann are both rescued, she can testify against him, so he immediately shoots her, then runs toward the stage waving his arms. The stage, however, has been attacked by Apaches, and everyone is dead except the driver, who is wounded and delirious. The driver, seeing Coleman in the road waving his arms, mistakes him for an attacking Indian and shoots him. Loi Yan Wu and Dollard, using the horses from the stage, set off, hoping to eventually settle in San Francisco together.

== Cast ==
- Warren Stevens as Jess Dollard
- Martin Landau as Dade Coleman
- Jody Lawrance as Dr. Ann Thompson
- Don Wilbanks as Maj. John Southern
- Del Moore as Hiram Best
- Robert Anderson as Carl 'Whip' Mott
- Judy Dan as Loi Yan Wu
- Rand Brooks as Quint Rucker
- Gene Roth as Jude
- Charles Tannen as Sheriff
- Mike Ragan as Ben Wade
- Mauritz Hugo as Roy
- Tim Bolton as Holster #1
- Milan Smith as Holster #2
- Alicia Li as Mai Lei
- Cherylene Lee as Ah Ling
