= Jana Lund =

American actress, model and singer (1933–1991)

- Lund in 1961
- Born: Johanna Cozette Ekelund; August 28, 1933; Los Angeles, California, U.S.
- Died: July 20, 1991 (aged 57); Los Angeles, California, U.S.
- Occupations: Actress, model, singer
- Years active: 1934–1963
- Spouse: Arthur Crowley (m. 1962; div. 1976)
- Children: 1

Jana Lund (born Johanna Cozette Ekelund; August 28, 1933 – July 20, 1991) was an American actress, model, and singer. She began her career as a young child actor. She had numerous roles on television shows and supporting roles in various films.

== Early life ==
Lund was born in Los Angeles to a family of actors. Her younger sister was Caryll Ann Ekelund, who appeared in the Shirley Temple film The Blue Bird and died of burns from fire before the film's release. She also had five older brothers.

Jana Ekelund attended Marymount College for a year and College of the Pacific for a year.

== Career ==
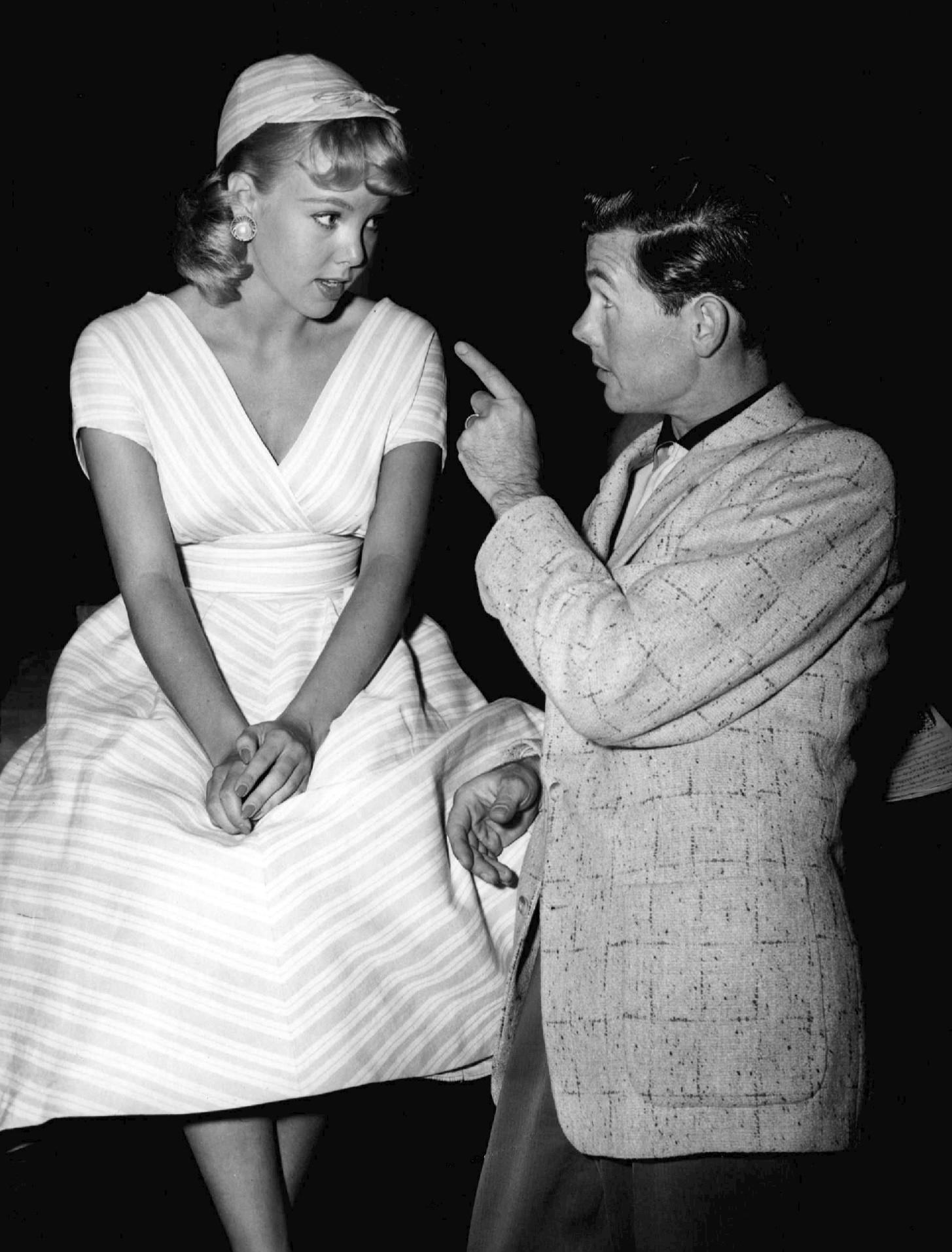
With Johnny Carson in 1955

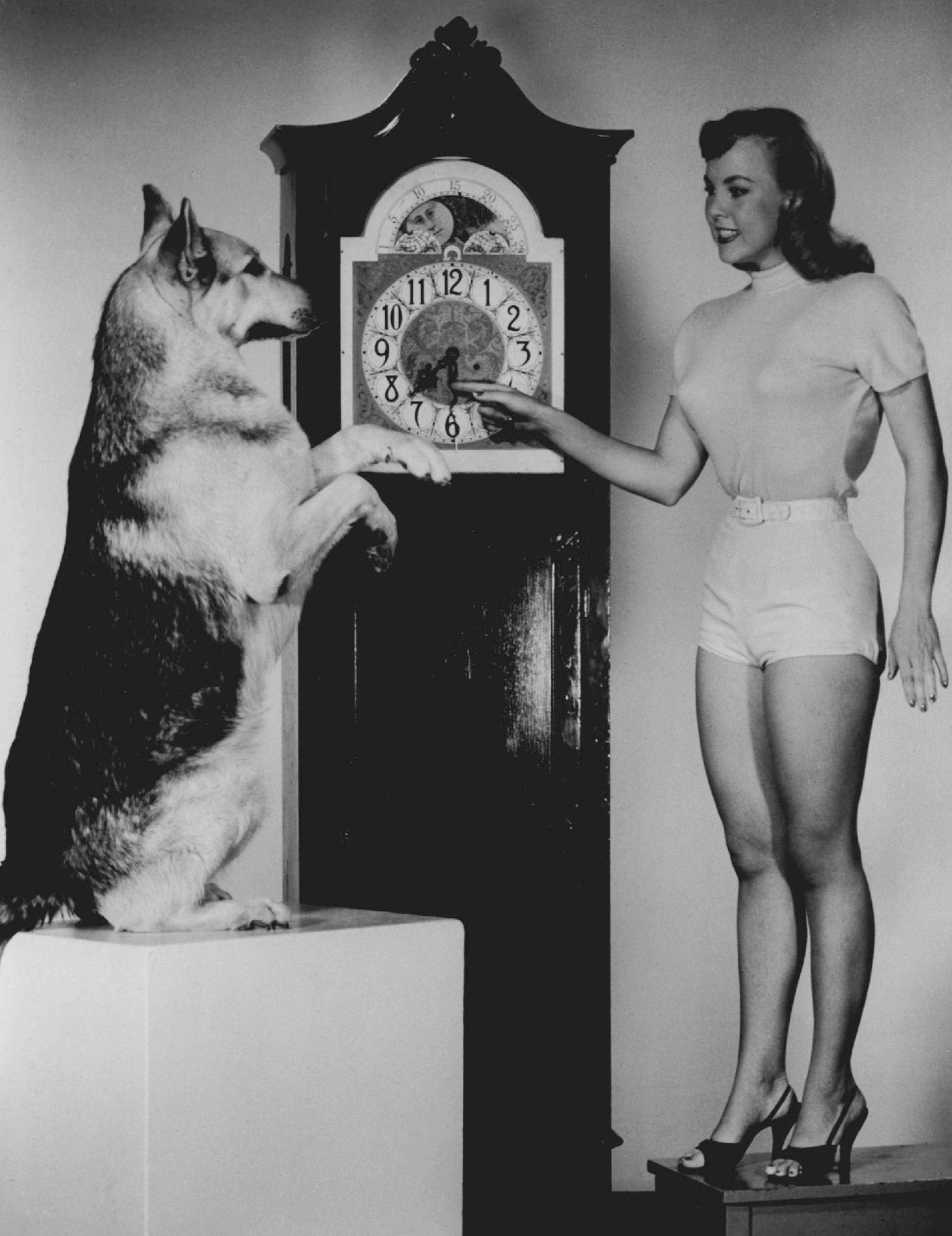
Rin Tin Tin and Lund in a T.V. promo reminder about daylight saving time

She performed on a California radio show at age three. She appeared in Our Gang comedies.

In August 1953, Lund was featured in an eight-page swimsuit spread in the magazine Pageant. She was part of advertising campaigns and appeared on television shows. In 1955, she joined The Johnny Carson Show as a singer.

Don't Knock the Rock (1956) was her first film as an adult. Lund appeared with Elvis Presley in the 1957 film Loving You; she gave him his first onscreen kiss. They reportedly kissed on their first meeting at the insistence of director Hal Kanter.

In the opening scene of Frankenstein 1970, she is pursued down a country lane. She portrayed Connie, the leader of the Hellcats, in High School Hellcats. She was a guest on the "Boomerang Bait" episode of Richard Diamond, Private Detective in 1959.

Lund was also a recording artist. Variety called her album "Johnny, the Dreamer" "a moody ballad that shows off newcomer Jana Lund as a dramatic stylist" and "Wishing Well" a "fair ballad with a breathless approach that attracts listeners" Comparing the album to contemporaneous releases by Frank Sinatra and Bing Crosby, another reviewer said "Lana Lund, the new Liberty star, may have the most sensuous voice of them all". She was a member of the Pied Pipers and the Roger Wagner Chorale, the latter with whom she sang at the coronation of Queen Elizabeth II.

A nightclub entertainer, Lund performed in Jerry Lewis' Los Angeles nightclub in 1962. Variety noted that she was a "pert little blonde" who was "known more for her telethesping than her singing" and that she sounded "light but pleasant". Variety called her an average singer and said that she had a "soft, sweet quality".

== Personal life ==
Jana Lund with her husband Arthur Crowley in 1961.

She enjoyed water skiing and skin diving. While she was at her college dormitory one night in 1952, two of her classmates dumped cold water on her as she slept on a top bunk. She woke up surprised, fell off the bed, and damaged three of her teeth. She sued them for $77,400 in damages, settling for $4,000 the day after a trial began in 1954.

Lund and Elvis Presley dated for a time. Lund married Hollywood lawyer Arthur Crowley in 1962 after dating him for several years. They had two children; they divorced in 1976. She died on July 20, 1991 in Los Angeles, California.

== Partial filmography ==
- Our Gang Follies of 1938 (1937) as coat check girl
- Don't Knock the Rock (1956) as Sunny Everett
- Loving You (1957) as Daisy Bricker
- High School Hellcats (1958) as Connie Harris a.k.a. Connie Ross
- Frankenstein 1970 (1958) as Carolyn Hayes
- Hot Car Girl (1958) as Janice Wheeler
- Up Jumped the Devil (1961)
- Married Too Young (1962)

== Discography ==
- "Johnny the Dreamer" / "Wishing Well" on Liberty records
