= The Beast of Budapest =

1958 film

- Directed by: Harmon Jones
- Written by: John McGreevey
- Produced by: Archie Mayo
- Production company: Barlene Corp
- Distributed by: Allied Artists
- Release date: February 23, 1958
- Country: USA
- Language: English

The Beast of Budapest is a 1958 American film about the Hungarian Revolution of 1956.

== Cast ==
- Gerald Milton as Col. Otto Zagon
- Greta Thyssen as Christi
- John Hoyt as Prof. Ernst Tolnai
- Violet Rensing as Marissa Foldessy
- Joseph Turkel as Martin
- John Mylong as Gen. Foldessy
- Michael Mills as Charles Tolnai
- Booth Colman as Lieutenant Stefko
- Svea Grunfeld as Teresa
- John Banner as Dr. Kovach
- Kurt Katch as Geza
- Ansis Tipans as AVH guard
- Robert Blake as Karolyi

== Production ==
It was one of six films Walter Mirisch of Allied greenlit for shooting between April and July 1957 the others being The Victor Riesel Story, New Day At Sundown, Walk Tall, Death In Small Doses and Yellow Knife.

Filming started 19 August 1957.

== Reception ==
The Los Angeles Times said it was "poorly made".

Variety called it "a serious effort to understand and portray the tragic episode but it still comes off as superficial comment. It is reminiscent of those early pictures about the Nazis."
