= Quiz Whizz =

1958 film by Jules White

- Directed by: Jules White
- Written by: Searle Kramer
- Produced by: Jules White
- Starring: Moe Howard; Larry Fine; Joe Besser; Gene Roth; Greta Thyssen; Milton Frome; Emil Sitka; Bill Brauer
- Cinematography: Irving Lippman
- Edited by: William A. Lyon
- Distributed by: Columbia Pictures
- Release date: February 13, 1958 (U.S.)
- Running time: 15:25
- Country: United States
- Language: English

Quiz Whizz is a 1958 short subject directed by Jules White starring American slapstick comedy team The Three Stooges (Moe Howard, Larry Fine and Joe Besser). It is the 183rd entry in the series released by Columbia Pictures starring the comedians, who released 190 shorts for the studio between 1934 and 1959.

== Plot ==
Quiz show victor Joe falls victim to the deceptive tactics of fraudsters G. Y. Prince and R. O. Broad, who swindle him into investing his winnings in Consolidated Fujiyama California Smog Bags. Seeking restitution, the Stooges embark on a quest to reclaim Joe's lost funds by visiting the offices of the perpetrators. Instead of encountering the swindlers, they encounter two seemingly empathetic businessmen who propose a deal: they will reimburse the losses if Moe, Larry, and Joe agree to pose as juvenile wards for wealthy eccentric Montgomery M. Montgomery and his conniving wife, Lisa.

Unbeknownst to the Stooges, Montgomery is the leader of Prince and Broad's criminal syndicate, and their participation in the charade places them in mortal danger. Despite the peril, the Stooges reluctantly comply with the arrangement, engaging in various antics such as Larry and Moe feigning blindness and Joe enduring the consumption of a large cigar. However, their ruse is uncovered, leading to a confrontation wherein the Stooges incapacitate the criminals.

Upon attempting to split the recovered funds equally among themselves, the Stooges encounter a humorous mishap, necessitating the reassembly of the torn check as they navigate the aftermath of their misadventure.

== Production notes ==
Filmed on May 2–3, 1957, Quiz Whizz features Moe and Larry's more "gentlemanly" haircuts, first suggested by Joe Besser. However, these had to be used sparingly, as most of the shorts with Besser were remakes of earlier films, and new footage had to be matched with old. However, in Quiz Whizz, Larry's frizz is combed back, while Moe retained his sugarbowl bangs.

This film marks the return of supporting actor Harold Brauer and it is his only appearance in a Joe Besser film.

== See also ==
- List of American films of 1958
