= Valentino (1951 film) =

1951 film by Lewis Allen

- Directed by: Lewis Allen
- Written by: George Bruce
- Produced by: Edward Small
- Starring: Eleanor Parker
- Cinematography: Harry Stradling Sr.
- Edited by: Daniel Mandell
- Music by: Heinz Roemheld
- Color process: Technicolor
- Production company: Edward Small Productions
- Distributed by: Columbia Pictures
- Release dates: April 13, 1951 (Los Angeles); April 19, 1951 (New York)
- Running time: 104 minutes
- Country: United States
- Language: English
- Budget: $1.3 million
- Box office: $1,550,000 (U.S. rentals)

Valentino is a 1951 American biographical film of the actor Rudolph Valentino directed by Lewis Allen and starring Anthony Dexter and Eleanor Parker.

== Plot ==
Aboard a steamship from Naples, young Rudolph Valentino works as a dancer. He falls in love with actress Joan Carlisle. Maria Torres, the leader of the dance ensemble, grows jealous and dismisses Rudolph. After arriving in New York, the penniless Rudolph works as a dishwasher and befriends waiter Luigi Verducci but is fired after a brawl. Rudolph is hired as a dancer at a nightclub, where he also secures a job for Luigi.

Rudolph's refined European dance style becomes popular among high-society women. One evening, film director Bill King visits the club with Joan. Rudolph dances a tango with her and King considers casting him in his next film. Rudolph plays a small role alongside Lila Reyes, who explains that Joan has influence over casting decisions. Rudolph and Joan start a relationship. Bill asks Joan whether she would approve of casting Rudolph. When she learns that Rudolph knows about her influence, she accuses him of dating her because of it. Rudolph is offended when Joan angrily offers him money.

Rudolph travels to Hollywood and begins acting in minor roles. He hears about auditions for a production of The Four Horsemen of the Apocalypse. Hoping to impress producer Mark Towers, he plans a dance performance with Lila. However, Towers refuses to cast a newcomer. In costume, Rudolph and Lila attend a party hosted by Towers, where their passionate dance persuades Towers to award the role to Rudolph.

The film becomes a success, and Rudolph brings Luigi to Hollywood as his assistant. Rudolph lands larger roles in films, quickly becoming a heartthrob. He is unable to reconnect with Joan, who is now dating King. Rudolph follows her to a beach vacation and they reconcile. He professes his love but admits that he has no desire to marry, and Joan parts with him amicably.

Rudolph's career flourishes, enabling him to purchase an estate that he names Falcon's Lair. He is cast as the lead in the romantic drama The Sheik, which King will direct, and Joan will play the female lead. The romantic scenes between Rudolph and Joan are uneasy, leading to numerous retakes. King and journalist Eddie Morgan observe the tension between them. Rudolph vows never to work with Joan again.

The Sheik becomes a blockbuster, but Rudolph refuses to make a sequel with Joan. He embarks on a trip with Luigi but suffers a bout of appendicitis. Morgan visits Rudolph to gather gossip about his relationship with Joan, but Rudolph will not divulge any information. Morgan begins spying on them, convinced that they are having an affair.

Towers pressures King to convince Rudolph to film with Joan again. Joan confesses that she still loves Rudolph but no longer feels anything for her husband. Morgan's photographers capture them together, and Rudolph is embroiled in a scuffle while Morgan threatens to ruin both Rudolph and Joan.

Despite his worsening pain, Rudolph calls Lila for help. He arranges to meet Joan and Morgan. To protect Joan from scandal, Rudolph lies, claiming that he cannot be with her because of the situation. Joan realizes that he is lying to shield her. When Morgan arrives, Rudolph announces his engagement to Lila, who corroborates the story. Morgan agrees not to publish the scandal.

On his way to New York, Rudolph collapses and dies shortly afterward in a hospital. When Joan reads the news of his death in the papers, she asks King whether he ever knew her true feelings, and King assures her that he did.

Rudolph's funeral becomes a major public event. For years, a woman dressed in black visits his grave on the anniversary of his death.

== Cast ==
- Eleanor Parker as Joan Carlisle
- Richard Carlson as Bill King
- Patricia Medina as Lila Reyes
- Joseph Calleia as Luigi Verducci
- Dona Drake as Maria Torres
- Lloyd Gough as Eddie Morgan
- Otto Kruger as Mark Towers
- Anthony Dexter as Rudolph Valentino
- Charles Coleman as Albert (uncredited)
- Eric Wilton as Butler (uncredited)

== Production ==
Edward Small announced the project in 1938, with Jack Dunn slated for the title role. However, the project was delayed by script troubles, legal threats, World War II and difficulty casting an actor to play the lead. Small unsuccessfully tried to cast Cornel Wilde and also considered Frederik Vayder, Louis Jourdan, Helmut Dantine and John Derek. Anthony Dexter was selected from more than 2,000 actors who had auditioned. He took acting and dancing lessons in preparation for the role. Director Lewis Allen was hired from Paramount and paid $60,000.

Florence Ryan wrote a script in 1939, but it was repeatedly rewritten as many as 30 times, including drafts by Edward Chodorov, Stephen Longstreet, Sheridan Gibney, Frederick J. Jackson, Virginia Van Upp and George Oppenheimer. The final script was heavily fictionalized to avoid lawsuits from Valentino's former wives, industry associates and family. Small could not obtain clearance from either of Valentino's wives, so the script does not feature either woman. Valentino is instead portrayed with three fictitious lovers in the film, one of whom is his married costar.

In 1949, producer Jan Grippo announced plans to produce a rival film but eventually reached an agreement with Small, and Grippo became an associate producer on the film. There has also been another proposed project starring Victor Mature and Pola Negri.

Filming began on June 2, 1950 and took place at the Columbia Ranch and the Samuel Goldwyn Studio. George Melford, who had directed Valentino in the 1920s, has a supporting role.

The film includes recreated sequences from Valentino films such as The Sheik (1921), Blood and Sand (1922), A Sainted Devil (1924) and The Eagle (1925). Although the films depicted in Valentino are real, the directors are fictionalized. Melford directed The Sheik and Rex Ingram directed The Four Horsemen of the Apocalypse.

Alice Terry sued the filmmakers for $750,000, complaining that she was depicted in the film as having an illicit love affair while still married. Valentino's brother and sister launched a $500,000 lawsuit against the filmmakers. Both cases settled out of court.

== Reception ==
In a contemporary review for The New York Times, critic Bosley Crowther wrote: "This spectacularly awful simulation of a valid biography is about as far from actual history or even intelligence as anything could be. And the quality of writing and acting that has gone into its fustian romance make for some of the corniest histrionics that have been loosed on the battered screen in years. To be sure, Valentino was corny. So were most of his films—at least, by our present day standards. And so, in a way, was his career. But it wasn't the sort of corny that this silly, loudly colored picture is—the sort that exudes in radio serials and true-romance fictional yarns."

Critic Edwin Schallert of the Los Angeles Times wrote: "Pegging his picture on the personality of a famous movie idol of the early 20s, Edward Small, as producer, has succeeded in bringing to the screen a story of the fabled silent film era in 'Valentino' that has many merits. Those who remember that era and the star perhaps will find him but fleetingly present in the picture, and they may even say he is not the true Valentino. They will be right. But as a biography a la film the production ... has much more to its credit than against it."
