= Mask of the Avenger =

1951 film by Phil Karlson

- Directed by: Phil Karlson
- Written by: Ralph Gilbert Bettison; George Bruce
- Produced by: Hunt Stromberg
- Starring: John Derek; Anthony Quinn; Jody Lawrance; Arnold Moss; Eugene Iglesias
- Cinematography: Charles Lawton Jr.
- Edited by: Jerome Thoms
- Music by: Mario Castelnuovo-Tedesco
- Distributed by: Columbia Pictures
- Release date: June 27, 1951
- Running time: 83 minutes
- Country: United States
- Language: English

Mask of the Avenger is a 1951 American historical adventure film directed by Phil Karlson and starring John Derek, Anthony Quinn and Jody Lawrance.

Derek portrays Renato Dimorna, an Italian who vows revenge after the murder of his aristocratic father Count Dimorna during the European political upheaval of 1848.

== Cast ==
- John Derek as Capt. Renato Dimorna
- Anthony Quinn as Viovanni Larocca
- Jody Lawrance as Maria d'Orsini
- Arnold Moss as Colardi
- Eugene Iglesias as Rollo D'Anterras
- Dickie LeRoy as Jacopo
- Harry Cording as Zio
- Ian Wolfe as Signor Donner
- Wilton Graff as Count Dimorna
