= Toughest Gun in Tombstone =

1958 film by Earl Bellamy

The Toughest Gun in Tombstone
- Directed by: Earl Bellamy
- Written by: Orville H. Hampton
- Produced by: Robert E. Kent
- Starring: George Montgomery; Jim Davis; Beverly Tyler; Gerald Milton
- Cinematography: Kenneth Peach, A.S.C.
- Edited by: William Rivol
- Music by: Paul Dunlap
- Production company: Peerless Productions, Inc.
- Distributed by: United Artists
- Release date: May 14, 1958 (United States)
- Running time: 72 minutes
- Country: United States
- Language: English

The Toughest Gun in Tombstone is a 1958 American Western film directed by Earl Bellamy and starring George Montgomery.

== Opening narration ==
"In the early eighteen-eighties, when all law enforcement failed in Arizona Territory, cattle rustling, robbery and murder began a notorious reign. As law agencies became disorganized, crime organized and grew powerful under the leadership of three of the West's most vicious outlaws — Johnny Ringo, Ike Clanton and Curly Bill Brocious. The situation became so bad that President Chester A. Arthur, on April the twenty-sixth, eighteen eighty two, authorized the governor of Arizona Territory to resort to any means he saw fit to crush the rule of the outlaws. The last desperate battle against the murderous gangs of the West was to begin in a very strange way — in a remote stretch of country just outside the town of Phoenix."

== Plot ==
Before initiating an undercover investigation in Tombstone, Arizona, Arizona Ranger Captain Matt Sloane (George Montgomery) sets out to build a reputation for himself as a ruthless man. Sloane distributes "wanted" circulars describing his supposed criminal exploits, drops off his young son, Terry (Scotty Morrow), with a friend and joins a vicious gang headed up by his target, reckless outlaw, Johnny Ringo (Jim Davis). As Sloane works his way into Ringo's inner circle, Terry goes home in search of his father.

== Closing narration ==
"The outlaw empire of Arizona Territory had been broken. And, in this new and decent land, Captain Matt Sloane found his home."

== Cast ==
- George Montgomery as Matt Sloane
- Jim Davis as Ringo
- Beverly Tyler as Della
- Gerald Milton as Clanton
- Don Beddoe as Cooper
- Scotty Morrow as Terry
- Harry Lauter as Barger
- Charles Wagenheim as Beasley
- Lane Bradford as Bill
- Rodolfo Hoyos as Colonel

Uncredited (in order of appearance)
Gregg Barton	Leslie, one of the henchmen
Hank Worden	liveryman
Tex Terry	driver of stagecoach
Rico Alaniz	Fernandez
William Forrest	Governor of Arizona Territory
Harry Strang	Dr. MacAvoy
Milan Smith	one of the henchmen

== See also ==
- List of American films of 1958
