= Catch Me If You Can (1959 film) =

1959 film by Don Weis

- Directed by: Don Weis
- Written by: Jean Holloway
- Produced by: Alberto Montes; Charles Bruce Newbery
- Starring: Gilbert Roland; Dina Merrill; Greta Thyssen
- Cinematography: Alan Stensvold
- Production company: RKO Pictures
- Release date: April 13, 2026 (Hollywood Theatre)
- Running time: 85 minutes
- Country: United States
- Languages: English; Spanish

Catch Me If You Can is a 1959 American film noir romantic drama directed by Don Weis and starring Gilbert Roland, Dina Merrill and Greta Thyssen. The film was shot in Havana, Cuba during the fall of 1958, when the Cuban Revolution was nearly at an end. According to cast member Jonathan Harris, the finished film never left Cuba because it was seized by the new government. It was considered lost until a 35mm print was discovered in Portland, Oregon in April 2026 and screened by the Hollywood Theatre.

== Plot ==
Shipping magnate Gilberto Ramnes pays his estranged wife Olga $300,000 to return a necklace, but she gives him a forgery and keeps the original. Meanwhile, Gilberto meets Francine Colby, who claims to be a tourist but is actually working with thief Dante Andare to steal the necklace. After learning that Olga has the real necklace, Francine convinces Gilberto to pay Dante $50,000 to steal the necklace from Olga's safe. Having done so, Dante plans to flee the country with Francine and sell the necklace, but Francine reveals that she is in love with Gilberto, and convinces Dante to take the money and use the forgery to extort Olga. Dante sneaks back into Olga's house, convinces her to give him another $50,000 for what she thinks is the real necklace, and then leaves Cuba. Olga is out to dinner wearing the fake necklace when she is shocked to see Francine wearing the real necklace, at another table with Gilberto.

== Cast ==
- Gilbert Roland as Gilberto Ramnes
- Dina Merrill as Francine Colby
- Greta Thyssen as Olga
- Cesare Danova as Dante Andare
- Antonio Moreno as Sablon
- Jonathan Harris as Lindström
- Gina Romand as Blonde Girl
- Emilio G. Navarro
- Betty Evans
- Rogelio del Castillo
- Salvador Levy
