= Married Too Young =

1962 film by George Moskov

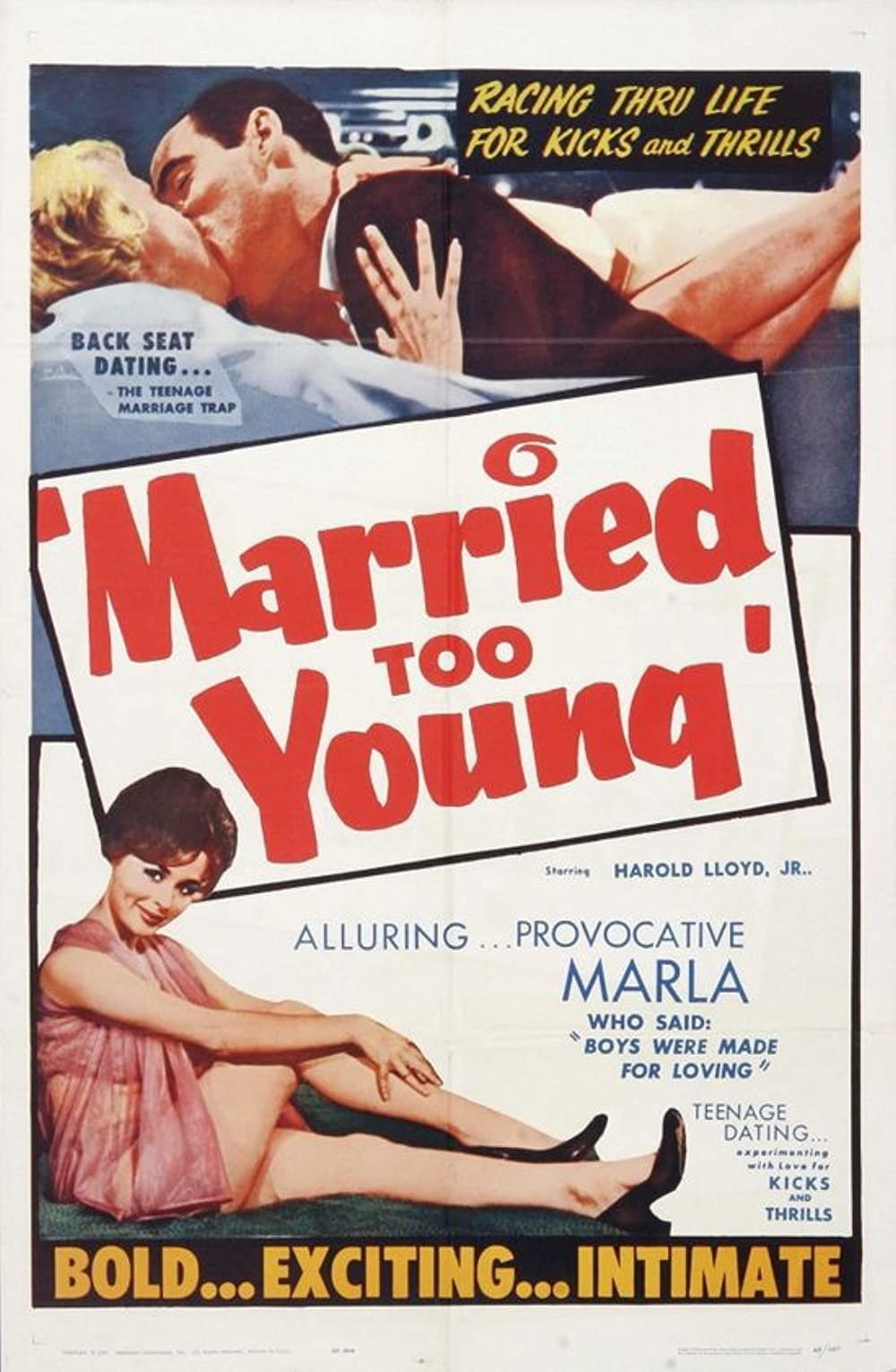
- Release poster, 1962
- Directed by: George Moskov
- Written by: Nathaniel Tanchuck; Edward D. Wood, Jr.
- Release date: June 30, 1962

Married Too Young is an American film released in 1962. It was directed by George Moskov. The storyline involves two teenagers who elope and get in trouble.

The film was "long been believed to have been either written or co written by Edward D. Wood, Jr", although "screenwriter Nathaniel Tanchuck's daughter, Heather Tanchuck, has stated that Wood had absolutely nothing to do with the film". However, in 2013 documents were found showing that Wood had contracted to rewrite the film, and had gone so far as to sue for nonpayment on the contract.

The film was the first feature film to present Harold Lloyd Jr. in a leading role. In the film, the 31-year-old Lloyd played a 17-year-old high school student who marries his high school girlfriend. Lloyd complained that poster art for the film "show him with a voluptuous girl who has only a bit role", to which he said, "when people take a look at one of these still pictures they're going to think I'm some sort of sex fiend".

== Plot ==
Tommy (Harold Lloyd Jr.) and Helen (Jana Lund), a 17-year old high school couple feeling guilt over their physical desires decide to marry. They cross the state line and have a ceremony performed by a justice of the peace. Their parents discover the marriage, and complain to the justice of the peace, who scolds the parents for the upbringing that led to this result. Tommy becomes involved in a car theft ring, and takes Helen with him to deliver a stolen car. Chased by the police, they drive off a cliff, but survive, and are taken before a judge who offers them probation if their parents will do a better job of raising them.

== Cast ==
- Harold Lloyd Jr. as Tommy Blaine
- Jana Lund as Helen Newton
- Anthony Dexter
- Trudy Marshall
- Brian O´Hara
- Nita Loveless
- Lincoln Demyan
- Marianna Hill
- Cedric Jordan
- Jamie Forster
- George Cisar as Miltie
- Joel Mondeaux
- David Bond as the Justice of the Peace
- Richard Davies as the Judge
- Irene Ross

== Reception ==
TV Guide rated Married Too Young at 2/5 stars. One reviewer called it a drab potboiler. Another write up described the plot as a stretch as it relates to bad parenting.
