= Captain John Smith and Pocahontas =

1953 film by Lew Landers

- Directed by: Lew Landers
- Screenplay by: Jack Pollexfen; Aubrey Wisberg
- Produced by: Jack Pollexfen; Aubrey Wisberg
- Starring: Anthony Dexter; Jody Lawrance
- Cinematography: Ellis W. Carter
- Edited by: Fred R. Feitshans Jr.
- Music by: Albert Glasser
- Color process: Pathécolor
- Production company: Edward Small Productions
- Distributed by: United Artists
- Release date: November 20, 1953
- Running time: 76 minutes
- Country: United States
- Language: English

Captain John Smith and Pocahontas is a 1953 American historical Western film directed by Lew Landers. The distributor was United Artists. It stars Anthony Dexter, Jody Lawrance and Alan Hale.

While most scenes were filmed in Virginia's Blue Ridge Mountains region, exteriors were shot around Bronson Canyon. It depicts the foundation of the Jamestown Colony in Virginia by English settlers and the relationship between John Smith and Pocahontas. She married John Rolfe in real life. It is also known by the alternative title Burning Arrows. Regarded as a B movie, the film has gained a cult following.

== Plot ==
Captain John Smith tells the story of Jamestown colony to the court of King James I. In 1607, the colonists have found more hardships than gold in Jamestown and Captain Wingfield is making plans to abandon the settlement. Smith, locked aboard the Godspeed, escapes and swims to the river bank. He warns the camp of an Indian attack. The colonists repel the first attack. The Indians fire burning arrows into the camp; then Smith orders John Rolfe to swim across the river and warn the ships. The settlers take cover during the second Indian attack which is repelled by cannon fire from the ships. Smith is elected as leader of the colony; and the settlers build a wooden stockade for protection. Rations are running out and it is discovered that the ships have gone. Smith goes on an expedition to make peace with Chief Powhatan where he meets Pocahontas briefly but is later captured by warriors. Before his execution, Pocahontas saves him. She is married to Smith to keep a peace between the settlers.

The following day, a settler finds gold and tells Wingfield. He plans to fail the colony so that the gold will not be given to The Virginia Company. Smith returns with Indians who bring supplies and teach the colonists how to grow crops. The next day, Macklin spots Wingfield hiding gold and giving guns to Opechanco's warriors; but Turnbull kills him and Nataquas is blamed. Nataquas is lashed and given the blame for his death until Smith arrives. Wingfield tells Opechanco to attack and wipe out the colonists, but to spare himself. The colonists repel the attack; and amid the fight Turnbull is killed by an arrow. Opechanco kills Nataquas, who planned to tell Chief Powhatan, and Pocahontas runs to Jamestown and tells Smith. To avenge Nataquas, Smith decides to fight Opechanco and kills him. Wingfield kills Davis for the gold and sets the gunpowder storehouse on fire. Smith fights him and escapes from the hut as it explodes. The ships arrive and the doctor sends Smith to rest aboard the ship. Smith leaves Jamestown to sail back to England, leaving Rolfe in charge. After telling his story, Smith leaves the court of King James I. The film ends with the statue of Pocahontas in London.

"A great lady - a princess of her people"

== Cast ==
- Anthony Dexter – Captain John Smith
- Jody Lawrance – Pocahontas (Matoaka)
- Alan Hale Jr. – Fleming
- Robert Clarke – John Rolfe
- Stuart Randall – Opechanco
- James Seay – Edward Maria Wingfield
- Philip Van Zandt – Davis
- Shepard Menken – Nantaquas
- Douglass Dumbrille – Chief Powhatan (Wahunsonacock)
- Anthony Eustrel – King James
- Henry Rowland – Turnbull
- Eric Colmar – Kemp
- William Cottrell – Macklin (uncredited)
- Francesca De Scaffa – Powhatan Maiden (uncredited)
- Joan Dixon – Powhatan Maiden (uncredited)
- Jack Kenny – Settler who Discovers Gold (uncredited)
- John Maxwell – Ship's Doctor (uncredited)
- Billy Wilkerson – Sub-Chief (uncredited)

== Release ==
The film was issued on a double bill with The Steel Lady.

== Reception ==
Due to the lower limit budget, the film proved to be unsuccessful both by critics and at the box office. Hal Erickson of AllMovie gave the film his lowest star rating.
