= The Leather Saint =

1956 film by Alvin Ganzer

- Theatrical release poster
- Directed by: Alvin Ganzer
- Written by: Alvin Ganzer; Norman Retchin
- Produced by: Norman Retchin
- Starring: John Derek; Paul Douglas; John Derek; Jody Lawrance; Cesar Romero; Ernest Truex; Richard Shannon; Ricky Vera
- Cinematography: Haskell B. Boggs
- Edited by: Floyd Knudtson
- Color process: Black and white
- Production company: Paramount Pictures
- Distributed by: Paramount Pictures
- Release date: June 6, 1956
- Running time: 86 minutes
- Country: United States
- Language: English

The Leather Saint is a 1956 American drama film noir sport film, directed by Alvin Ganzer in black-and-white VistaVision, about Gil Allen, a priest who boxes. It stars John Derek, Paul Douglas and Jody Lawrance.

== Plot ==
Although he is a minister, the young Gil Allen likes to work out in Tom Kelly's boxing gym. Gus MacAuliffe, a manager of fighters who doesn't know the young man's true vocation, offers to find him a fight in the ring, but Gil declines.

Gil discovers that the church is desperate to raise funds for two things, a swimming pool for children and an iron lung for a hospital. Without disclosing his profession, Gil agrees to let Gus handle him, and Gil's first opponent is knocked out with a single punch. The impressed promoter Tony Lorenzo arranges another fight for the kid. Lorenzo's girlfriend, Pearl Gorman, a singer with a drinking habit, is immediately attracted to Gil, but when he doesn't reciprocate, she continues to hit the bottle.

Gil's superior at the church, Father Ritchie, mentions to Gil that someone mysteriously has donated the first down payment for the iron lung. Gil fibs to the priest that the donor is a well-meaning individual in "the leather business." Gil's actual identity is discovered by Pearl, who is inspired by the young minister's example and vows to quit drinking. Gil raises all the money that's needed, then gladly returns to his preferred line of work.

== Cast ==
- Paul Douglas as Gus MacAuliffe
- John Derek as Father Gil Allen
- Jody Lawrance as Pearl Gorman
- Cesar Romero as Tony Lorenzo
- Ernest Truex as Father Ritchie
- Richard Shannon as Tom Kelly
- Ricky Vera as Pepito
- Robert Cornthwaite as Dr. Lomas
- Edith Evanson as Stella
- Lou Nova as Tiger
- Baynes Barron as Tony's Henchman

== Production ==
The film was originally about a Catholic priest. However Catholic groups objected due to the romance subplot so the script was adjusted and the main character Gil Allen became an Episcopalian priest instead.

== Reception ==
FilmInk argued "This should have been surefire material – the priest is raising money for a hospital, a gangster’s moll falls for him, etc – but the film is wonkily structured and Derek can’t paper over its flaws. This movie, more than any other, proved that Derek wasn’t a proper film star. A Tony Curtis or a Rock Hudson would have made this compelling; Derek was unable to."

== See also ==
- List of boxing films
