= Three Blondes in His Life =

1961 film

- Directed by: Leon Chooluck
- Written by: George Moskov
- Produced by: George Moskov
- Starring: Jock Mahoney
- Cinematography: Ernest Haller
- Edited by: Maurice Wright
- Music by: André Brummer
- Distributed by: Cinema Associates
- Release date: January 1961
- Running time: 86 minutes
- Country: United States
- Language: English

Three Blondes in His Life is a 1961 American neo noir directed by Leon Chooluck and starring Jock Mahoney.

== Plot ==
An insurance investigator, Duke Wallace, is assigned to investigate the disappearance of a colleague. The wife tells Duke that her husband was fond of blonde women. He is later found killed in a cabin in the mountains. Duke is convinced that a blonde has something to do with his demise and begins looking through his most recent cases.

== Cast ==
- Jock Mahoney as Duke Wallace
- Greta Thyssen as Helen Fortner
- Anthony Dexter as Charlie Walsh
- Jesse White as Ed Kelly
- Valerie Porter as Martha Carr
- Elaine Edwards as Lois Collins
