= Lee Siegel =

Lee Siegel may refer to:

- Lee Siegel (cultural critic)
- Lee Siegel (professor and novelist)
