= Phantom from Space =

1953 film by W. Lee Wilder

- Theatrical release poster
- Directed by: W. Lee Wilder
- Screenplay by: William Raynor; Myles Wilder
- Story by: Myles Wilder
- Produced by: W. Lee Wilder
- Starring: Ted Cooper; Noreen Nash; Dick Sands; Burt Wenland
- Cinematography: William H. Clothier
- Edited by: George Gale
- Music by: William Lava
- Color process: Black and white
- Production company: Planet Filmplays
- Distributed by: United Artists
- Release date: May 15, 1953
- Running time: 73 minutes
- Country: United States
- Language: English

Phantom from Space is a 1953 independently made American science fiction horror film produced and directed by W. Lee Wilder and starring Ted Cooper, Noreen Nash, Dick Sands, and Burt Wenland. The screenplay was by William Raynor and Myles Wilder. Working with most of the same crew, this was one of several early 1950s films made by Wilder and son Myles on a financing-for-distribution basis with United Artists and, on occasion, RKO Radio Pictures.

== Plot ==
Federal Communications Commission (FCC) investigators arrive in the San Fernando Valley after what appears to be a flying saucer crash, causing massive interference with tele-radio transmissions. During their investigation, they receive eyewitness reports of what appears to be a man dressed in a bizarre outfit, which appears to be radioactive and thus a public threat.

Their investigation uncovers that the man is actually a humanoid creature from outer space, who is invisible without his spacesuit. They start a massive manhunt for the invisible, radioactive alien running loose.

The action culminates in Los Angeles where the invisible alien has been tracked. He becomes trapped inside the famous Griffith Observatory. A woman lab assistant discovers that he can be seen using ultraviolet light. The alien attempts to communicate by tapping out a code, but no one can understand it. Now breathing heavily because his breathing gas reserves are now running low, he is trapped high-up on the Griffith telescope's upper platform. Because he can no longer survive without his breathing gas, he falters and then falls to his death. His body briefly becomes visible before completely evaporating.

== Cast ==
- Ted Cooper as Hazen
- Tom Daly as Charlie
- Steve Acton as Operator
- Burt Wenland as Joe
- Lela Nelson as Betty Evans
- Harry Landers as Lt. Bowers
- Burt Arnold as Darrow
- Sandy Sanders as Policeman
- Harry Strang as Neighbor
- Jim Bannon as Police Sergeant
- Jack Daly as Wakeman
- Michael Mark as Watchman
- Rudolph Anders as Dr. Wyatt
- James Seay as Major Andrews
- Noreen Nash as Barbara Randall
- Steve Clark as Bill Randall (as Steve Clark)
- Dick Sands as The Phantom

== Production and release ==
W. Lee Wilder formed a film production company in the early 1950s called Planet Filmplays for the purpose of producing and directing "quickie" low-budget science fiction films, with screenplays co-written with his son Miles.

Phantom from Space uses stock footage of radar rigs. Some of this stock footage would later reappear in Killers from Space (1954).

== Release ==
Phantom from Space opened on May 15, 1953.

== Home media ==
Legend Films released a colorized version of the film.

== Reception ==
The Monthly Film Bulletin wrote: "The idea of a human form with a silicon base instead of carbon could be an interesting one, but this science-fiction thriller is remarkably lacking in tension. The poor creature from another world is treated very badly by a section of the police, the air force and a scientist, who ridiculously expect a form of life from another planet to be modelled in the same way as man, invisible or otherwise. All but the very young will find the film unrewarding."

Variety wrote: "Cast go through the roles adequately, and Wilder's direction makes little demand on them in this seemingly hurry-up production job. Lensing by William Clothier, special effects by Alex Welden, and photographic effects by Howard Anderson, all contribute to the intended mood, which is heightened at appropriate points by the William Lava music score."

Film historian and critic Glenn Erickson reviewed the film's DVD release, writing, "After a couple of uninspired potboilers in the late 1940s (The Pretender is actually a good movie), Wilder hit his groove of incompetence with this no-budget wonder concerning the saddest space invader on record ... Endless talky scenes alternate with the entire cast of 6 running back and forth in the old interior of the Griffith Planetarium. The poor invader is a bald Muscle Beach type in a radioactive space suit and a helmet that appears to be the same prop from Robot Monster, somewhat altered."
