= Heartaches (1947 film) =

1947 American crime film

- Theatrical release poster
- Directed by: Basil Wrangell
- Screenplay by: George Bricker
- Story by: Monte Collins; Julian I. Peyser
- Produced by: Marvin D. Stahl
- Starring: Sheila Ryan; Edward Norris; Chill Wills; Kenneth Farrell; James Seay; Frank Orth; Chili Williams; Lash LaRue
- Cinematography: Jack Greenhalgh
- Edited by: Alfred DeGaetano; Charles Gross Jr.
- Music by: Emil Cadkin
- Production company: Producers Releasing Corporation
- Distributed by: Producers Releasing Corporation
- Release date: June 28, 1947
- Running time: 71 minutes
- Country: United States
- Language: English

Heartaches is a 1947 American crime film directed by Basil Wrangell and written by George Bricker. The film stars Sheila Ryan, Edward Norris, Chill Wills, Kenneth Farrell, James Seay, Frank Orth, Chili Williams and Lash LaRue. The film was released on June 28, 1947, by Producers Releasing Corporation.

== Cast ==
- Sheila Ryan as Toni Wentworth
- Edward Norris as Jimmy McDonald
- Chill Wills as Boagey Mann
- Kenneth Farrell as Vic Morton
- James Seay as Lt. Dan Armstrong
- Frank Orth as Mike Connelly
- Chili Williams as Sally
- Lash LaRue as DeLong
- Charles Mitchell as Pete Schilling
- Phyllis Planchard as Lila Fairchild
- Ann Staunton as Anne Connelly
- Arthur Space as Dan Savronic
