= The Devil on Wheels =

1947 film by Crane Wilbur

- Directed by: Crane Wilbur
- Written by: Crane Wilbur; Tony Sargent
- Produced by: Benjamin Stoloff
- Starring: Noreen Nash; Darryl Hickman; Terry Moore; Sue England
- Cinematography: L. William O'Connell
- Edited by: Alexander Troffey
- Music by: Emil Cadkin
- Distributed by: Producers Releasing Corporation
- Release date: March 2, 1947
- Running time: 67 minutes
- Language: English

The Devil On Wheels is a 1947 American drama film directed by Crane Wilbur and starring Darryl Hickman.

In addition to being the first film about street racing youth, it is also notable for being one of the first films to feature actresses (Terry Moore and Noreen Nash) wearing bikini tops.

A few scenes from one of the street races depicted were later reused in the opening of the 1950 film Hot Rod, also about street racing in Southern California.

== Plot ==
Michael "Micky" Clark (Hickman) turns his Ford roadster into a hot rod with his friend Todd (Robert Arthur), advised by Michael's older brother Jeff (James Cardwell), who learned about engines as a combat pilot. Todd (who has his own custom Ford hot rod) thinks Michael talks about his brother too much, but encourages him to soup up his car.

Michael's and Jeff's father John is on his way home in a brand-new convertible when he witnesses a fatal car accident, caused by reckless driving. Arriving home with the new car, Todd appreciates how the speedometer goes up to 120MPH, which causes John to give a lecture about the dangers of street racing. John has his own reckless driving habits (which he refuses to admit), on full display to the family when he gives them a ride in the new car.

Michael's girlfriend Peggy (Sue England), his friend Todd and Todd's girlfriend Rusty (Terry Moore) all make fun of Michael for wanting to be cautious behind the wheel. Upset by this, Michael decides to participate with Todd in a street race. Despite the police intervening, Michael doesn't give up reckless driving, taking Todd for a ride in his father's new convertible, driving recklessly through the streets and evading the police.

Despite close calls with police as well as the death of a fellow racer, they continue speeding, in part because of the encouragement from their girlfriends. Michael and Todd eventually push their luck to the point of fatal consequences. Michael's father John still possesses hotheaded driving habits, at least until he hears a police siren.

== Cast ==
- Darryl Hickman as Michael 'Micky' Clark
- James Cardwell as Jeff Clark
- Damian O'Flynn as John Clark
- Lenita Lane as Mrs. Clark
- Sue England as Peggy Andrews
- Robert Arthur as Todd Powell
- Terry Moore as Rusty Davis
- William Forrest as Judge Roger Tanner
- Noreen Nash as Sue Tanner
