= Chili Williams =

American pin-up model and actress (1921–2003)

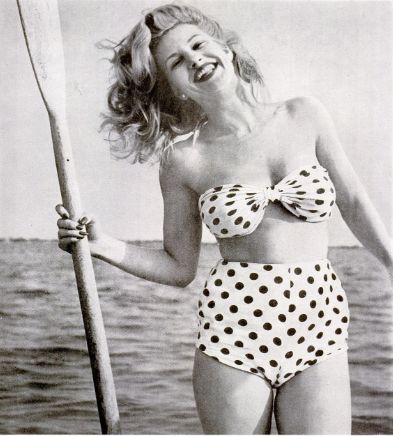
- Williams in Life magazine, 1943
- Born: Marian Sorenson; December 16, 1921; Minneapolis, Minnesota, U.S.
- Died: October 17, 2003 (aged 81); Garden Grove, California, U.S.
- Education: Marshall High School
- Occupations: Pin-up model, actress
- Years active: 1943–1953

Marian Uhlman (née Sorenson; December 16, 1921 – October 17, 2003), known as Chili Williams or the Polka Dot Girl, was an American pin-up model and actress. A photograph of her wearing a polka-dot two-piece bathing suit appeared in Life magazine in 1943 and became one of the most popular pin-up photographs of World War II. Following the popularity of her pin-up photographs, she also appeared in approximately 20 motion pictures between 1944 and 1952.

== Early years ==
Williams was born Marian Sorenson in 1921 in Minneapolis, Minnesota. Her mother was Norwegian and her father Danish. She graduated from Marshall High School. After graduating from high school, she worked as a stenographer and model for a fur store in Saint Paul, Minnesota. She also posed for photographs, one of which was seen by New York glamor artist Earl Moran.

== Modeling and acting career ==
=== The Polka Dot Girl ===
In June 1943, Marian Sorenson moved to New York City and joined Harry Conover's modeling agency. Conover gave Sorenson the name "Chili Williams". Conover had come up with the name previously and was waiting for the right girl.

Williams was photographed in 1943 wearing a polka dot two-piece bathing suit in the surf at Fire Island near the South Shore of Long Island in New York. Conover sent one of the photographs to Life magazine for its "Pictures to the Editor" column. Life published the photograph in its September 27, 1943, issue, along with Conover's letter stating: "This picture shows Miss Chili Williams, my newest Cover Girl ... This is one of her first pictures."

In issues that followed, Life published letters from soldiers asking for copies of the photograph. Finally, Life published a full-page copy of the famous photograph in its November 22, 1943, issue. The magazine noted that, since the photograph first appeared in the September 27 issue, Williams "has become the No. 1 pin-up girl of the U. S. armed forces."

Syndicated newspaper columnist Earl Wilson wrote in December 1943 that "the picture that caused all this rumpus" showed Williams "popping prominently out of a pair of polka dot bathing pants and a form-fitting polka dot bra." Wilson noted that, while others had been described as the No. 1 Pin-Up Girl, Williams was "the No 1 No. 1 Pin-Up Girl." He joked that the editors of Life "hate cheesecake like poison", but bowed to the demand for more Chili Williams.

By August 1944, Williams received "a record-breaking deluge of over 100,000 requests for her picture." Among the letters was an official communication from the crew of the submarine USS Trigger asking her to accept the title of "Trigger Girl". The Trigger was sunk in 1945 after being bombed by a Japanese aircraft.

During the height of her popularity in late 1943, Williams was seen dining regularly with South American playboy and billionaire Jorge Guinle. The pair were regulars at the Stork Club, El Morocco, and the swing clubs of 52nd Street.

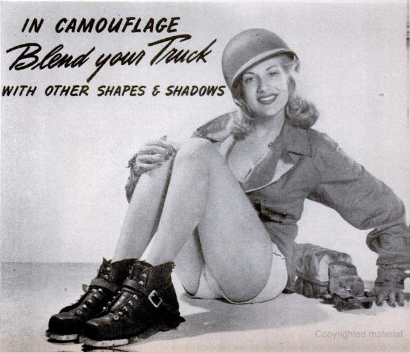
Williams in camouflage series

In 1944, the Army Engineers hired Williams to pose for a series of photographs to be used for training lectures on the use of camouflage. The Army stated in an official release that, by using images of Williams, "vital principles are impressed in the minds of camouflage students in a most effective manner."

In 1947 Herman Talmadge made her an honorary lieutenant colonel when she made an appearance in the Georgia Assembly during a debate.

In 1948, Williams was the grand marshal of a parade in San Mateo, California, while riding on a polka-dotted horse.

In 1969, The Baltimore Sun wrote:

Undoubtedly, the two most famous pin-up pictures of the war (the war) were the one of Betty Grable looking back over her shoulder at the camera, and the one of Chili Williams in a two-piece polka dot bathing suit. By today's standards the pictures were puritanical. But though unrevealing, they were sexy in a way that today's Playboy type pinup will never be. The fold-out bunnies were objects and Betty and Chili were people.

=== Acting career ===
In 1944 Williams had a role in the film Having Wonderful Crime, which the Los Angeles Times noted was her first film. While she acted in multiple films, she was not known for her work in movies.

== Family and later years ==
Williams's first marriage ended in divorce. She then married John Uhlman, a corporate public-relations representative, in 1954. They operated a dress shop in Las Vegas, Nevada, during the 1950s. She had a daughter, Amy, and a son, Cary. Williams and her husband later moved to Garden Grove, California. Interviewed in 1977 for a "where are they now?" story, she said:

My life is much happier and fulfilled now. The glamor life was fun, but I was never very happy in that business. Otherwise, I haven't changed much. I still wear the same size – 10 or 12 – and I have a few character lines on my face. I wear a bikini at the beach sometimes. I'm always going to the ocean; it's in my blood. I still feel I am the same person in that picture.

Williams died in California in 2003.

== Filmography ==
Film	Year	Role	Notes
Heavenly Days	1944	Office worker	uncredited
Girl Rush	1944	Girl	uncredited
The Falcon in Hollywood	1944	Beautiful blonde	uncredited
Having Wonderful Crime	1945	Blonde in polka dots	
Wonder Man	1945	Goldwyn girl	uncredited
George White's Scandals	1945	Showgirl	uncredited
Johnny Angel	1945	Redhead	uncredited
Copacabana	1947	Copa girl with Sobel	
Gas House Kids Go West	1947	Nan Crowley	
Heartaches	1947	Sally – Morton's secretary	
Assigned to Danger	1948	Secretary	uncredited
Raw Deal	1948	Marcy	
My Dream Is Yours	1949	Fan club president	uncredited
Kill the Umpire	1950	Chorus girl	uncredited
Where the Sidewalk Ends	1950	Teddy	uncredited
Frenchie	1950	Dealer	uncredited
The Las Vegas Story	1952	Guest	uncredited
A Girl in Every Port	1952	Car hop	uncredited
The Lusty Men	1952	Bit part	uncredited
Captive Women	1952	Second captive	

== See also ==
- Pin-ups of Yank, the Army Weekly
