= James Seay =

American actor (1914–1992)

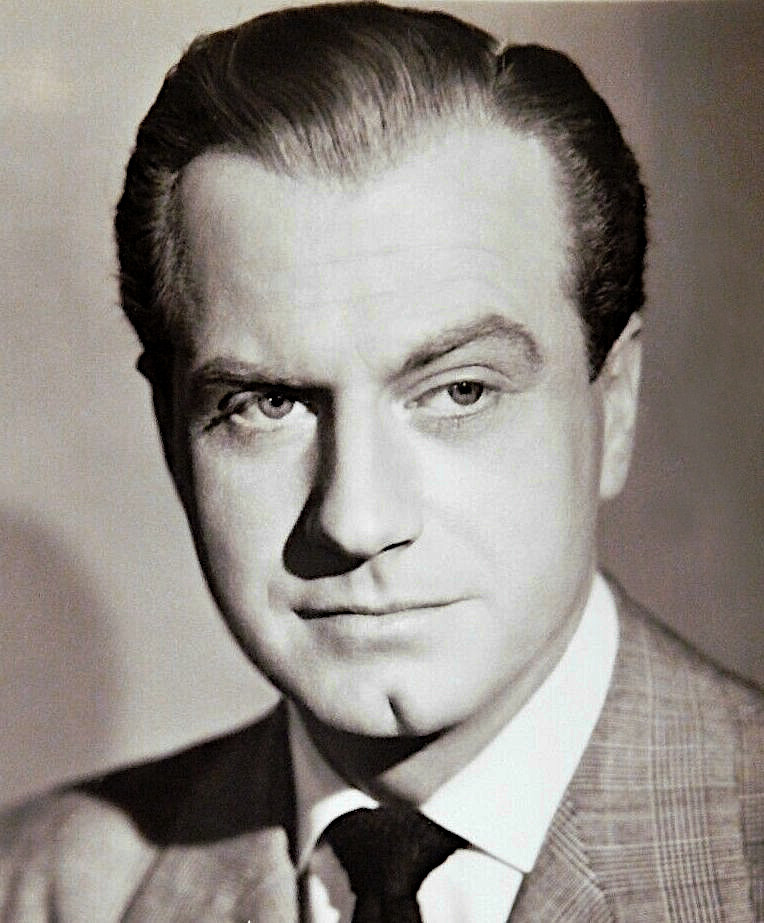
- Seay in 1948
- Born: James W. Seay; September 9, 1914; Pasadena, California, U.S.
- Died: October 10, 1992 (aged 78); Laguna Beach, California, U.S.
- Resting place: California
- Occupation: Actor
- Years active: 1939–1970
- Spouse(s): Vivian Cohn (m. 1942; div. 19??); Mercedes Carmen Bole (m. 1974)

James Seay (September 9, 1914 – October 10, 1992) was an American character actor who often played minor supporting roles as government officials.

== Early years ==
Seay demonstrated an interest in acting at an early age, as he and his mother regularly attended Saturday matinees of a stock theater company in Pasadena, California. After working for an insurance company, he became a student at the Pasadena Playhouse.

== Career ==
After a year at the Pasadena Playhouse, Seay spent the summer as leading man in a summer stock company at the Chapel Playhouse in Guilford, Connecticut. He returned to Pasadena and performed in two plays before he received a contract from Paramount He played a doctor in an "old folks home" in the film Miracle on 34th Street (1947).

Among his many credits, Seay appeared in minor roles in a couple of episodes of Adventures of Superman television series: "The Mind Machine" (as a senator) and "Jungle Devil" (as an airplane pilot).

Seay appeared sixteen times as Judge Spicer on ABC's western series, The Life and Legend of Wyatt Earp. He was cast six times as a sheriff on the NBC children's western series, Fury. He also guest starred in the syndicated aviation adventure series, Whirlybirds, and on the westerns The Californians, The Tall Man, and The Rebel.

He appeared three times in 1958 and 1959 on CBS' Perry Mason: murder victim Ross Hollister in "The Case of the Cautious Coquette," Dr. Michael Harris in "The Case of the Curious Bride," and murderer Ralph Hibberly in "The Case of the Spurious Sister."

He appeared on CBS's The Twilight Zone as the sheriff in the episode "In His Image" and as Agent Bowton in The Andy Griffith Show Season 4 episode, "The Haunted House" and the Season 5 episode, "Prisoner of Love". In 1960 he appeared on Bat Masterson.

Seay made training films for the United States Army Air Forces during World War II.

== Death ==
On October 10, 1992, Seay died in Laguna Beach, California. He is buried at Valhalla Memorial Park Cemetery in Burbank, California.

== Selected filmography ==
- Back Door to Heaven (1939) - Juror (uncredited)
- Emergency Squad (1940) - Slim, Buller's Chauffeur (uncredited)
- Women Without Names (1940) - O'Grane
- Opened by Mistake (1940) - Sam Peters (uncredited)
- Those Were the Days! (1940) - Andrews
- The Way of All Flesh (1940) - Varno
- Queen of the Mob (1940) - Eddie Webster
- Golden Gloves (1940) - Jimmy
- Oklahoma Renegades (1940) - Carl
- I Want a Divorce (1940) - Young Intern (uncredited)
- North West Mounted Police (1940) - Constable Fenton
- The Son of Monte Cristo (1940) - Lieutenant Stone
- Flight Command (1940) - Officer on Downed Seaplane (uncredited)
- Love Thy Neighbor (1940) - Boat Attendant (uncredited)
- The Green Hornet Strikes Again! (1940, Serial) - Bordine, a Gangster
- The Face Behind the Mask (1941) - Jeff Jeffries
- The Mad Doctor (1941) - Intern (uncredited)
- Meet Boston Blackie (1941) - Mechanical Man
- In Old Colorado (1941) - Hank Merritt
- Power Dive (1941) - Army Radio Operator (uncredited)
- Two in a Taxi (1941) - Cristy Reardon
- Flying Blind (1941) - Dave, Flight Dispatcher
- The Kid from Kansas (1941) - Lee Walker
- Mr. Celebrity (1941) - Jim Kane
- Keep 'Em Flying (1941) - Lieutenant (uncredited)
- They Died with Their Boots On (1941) - Lieutenant Walsh (uncredited)
- Dangerously They Live (1941) - Carl
- Man from Cheyenne (1942) - Sheriff Jim
- Ride 'Em Cowboy (1942) - Jack, Ranger Captain (uncredited)
- Joe Smith, American (1942) - Roy, Aircraft Plant Worker (uncredited)
- Tramp, Tramp, Tramp (1942) - Biggie Waldron
- Home in Wyomin' (1942) - Tex Harrison
- Ten Gentlemen from West Point (1942) - Courtney (uncredited)
- Eagle Squadron (1942) - Medical Officer (uncredited)
- Flight Lieutenant (1942) - Lieutenant Anderson (uncredited)
- Enemy Agents Meet Ellery Queen (1942) - Marine Sergeant Stevens
- Timber (1942) - Joe Radway
- Highways by Night (1942) - Westbrook, the Man with Trucks
- Time to Kill (1942) - Leslie Murdock (uncredited)
- Ridin' Down the Canyon (1942) - Burt Wooster
- Flight for Freedom (1943) - Naval Lieutenant (uncredited)
- Learn and Live (1943) - Joe Instructor (uncredited)
- Resisting Enemy Interrogation (1944) - Captain James N. Spencer (uncredited)
- B-29 Flight Engineer (1944) - Pilot (uncredited)
- Home, Sweet Homicide (1946) - Frank Riley (uncredited)
- Miracle on 34th Street (1947) - Dr. Pierce (uncredited)
- Heartaches (1947) - Lieutenant Dan Armstrong, Homicide
- Secret Beyond the Door (1947) - Bob Dwight
- T-Men (1947) - Hardy, Treasury Lab Technician (uncredited)
- Slippy McGee (1948) - Thomas Eustis
- The Cobra Strikes (1948) - Police Captain Monihan
- The Checkered Coat (1948) - Captain Dunhill
- An Innocent Affair (1948) - Lester Burnley
- The Strange Mrs. Crane (1948) - Mark Emery
- I Cheated the Law (1949) - Rodd Simpson
- Red Canyon (1949) - Joel Creech
- Prejudice (1949) - Minister
- Life of St. Paul Series (1949) - Barnabas
- Military Academy with That Tenth Avenue Gang (1950) - Major Norcross
- The Asphalt Jungle (1950) - Officer Janocek (uncredited)
- Union Station (1950) - Detective Eddie Shattuck
- Revenue Agent (1950) - Narrator (uncredited)
- The Flying Missile (1950) - Lieutenant Jackson (uncredited)
- Hunt the Man Down (1950) - Prosecutor (uncredited)
- Charlie's Haunt (1950) - Boss (uncredited)
- Fury of the Congo (1951) - Narrator (voice, uncredited)
- Up Front (1951) - Lieutenant Ferguson (uncredited)
- When the Redskins Rode (1951) - George Washington
- Strictly Dishonorable (1951) - Lili's Attorney (uncredited)
- When Worlds Collide (1951) - Donovan (uncredited)
- The Day the Earth Stood Still (1951) - Government Man (uncredited)
- Close to My Heart (1951) - Everett C. Heilner / Edward C. Hewitt
- Models Inc. (1952) - Detective Sergeant Mooney
- Brave Warrior (1952) - Governor William Henry Harrison
- Voodoo Tiger (1952) - Abel Peterson
- Torpedo Alley (1952) - Skipper
- Off Limits (1952) - Major Evans, MD (uncredited)
- The Homesteaders (1953) - John Kroger
- Problem Girls (1953) - Max Thorpe
- Jack McCall, Desperado (1953) - Bat McCall
- The War of the Worlds (1953) - Air Force Bomber Pilot (uncredited)
- Fort Ti (1953) - Mark Chesney
- Phantom from Space (1953) - Major Andrews
- Son of Belle Starr (1953) - George Clark
- Sea of Lost Ships (1953) - Executive Officer (uncredited)
- Captain John Smith and Pocahontas (1953) - Edward Maria Wingfield
- Killers from Space (1954) - Colonel Banks
- Captain Kidd and the Slave Girl (1954) - The Earl of Bellomont
- Return to Treasure Island (1954) - Felix Newman
- Vera Cruz (1954) - Abilene
- The Steel Cage (1954) - Dr. Perry (segment "The Hostages")
- Kiss Me Deadly (1955) - FBI Agent #2
- The Kentuckian (1955) - Riverboat Gambler (uncredited)
- I Died a Thousand Times (1955) - Man in Tropico Lobby (uncredited)
- At Gunpoint (1955) - Townsman in Saloon (uncredited)
- I've Lived Before (1956) - Fred Bolan (uncredited)
- Gun Brothers (1956) - Blackjack Silk
- Friendly Persuasion (1956) - Rebel Captain (uncredited)
- Man in the Vault (1956) - Paul De Camp
- The Big Land (1957) - Ben Rummert (uncredited)
- Beginning of the End (1957) - Captain James Barton
- Man of a Thousand Faces (1957) - Casting Director (uncredited)
- The Amazing Colossal Man (1957) - Colonel Hallock
- Pal Joey (1957) - Livingston (uncredited)
- Bombers B-52 (1957) - B-52 School Instructor (uncredited)
- Flood Tide (1958) - Doctor (uncredited)
- Street of Darkness (1958) - Jesse Flores
- The Buccaneer (1958) - Creole Militia Officer
- Official Detective (1958, TV Series, US series - Episode: "Extortion") - Cracker
- The Threat (1960) - Harry Keenan
- The Lawbreakers (1961) - Mayor Harold Emshaw (archive footage)
- Secret of Deep Harbor (1961) - Travis
- What Ever Happened to Baby Jane? (1962) - Police Officer #3
- Brainstorm (1965) - Judge at Scavenger Hunt (uncredited)
- First to Fight (1967) - Speaker at Bond Rally (uncredited)
- The Ballad of Josie (1967) - Territorial Politician (uncredited)
- The Destructors (1968) - Secretary of Defense
- Panic in the City (1968) - Pitt
- The Green Berets (1968) - Soldier (uncredited)
- There Was a Crooked Man... (1970) - Aide to Lieutenant Governor (uncredited)

=== Selected Television ===
Year	Title	Role	Notes
1953	Death Valley Days	Jim Butler	Season 2, Episode 4, "Which Side of the Fence?"
1955	Death Valley Days	District Attorney Lucius Peck	Episode, "The Hangman Waits"
1963	The Andy Griffith Show	Agent Bowton	Season 4 episode, "The Haunted House" and the Season 5 episode, "Prisoner of Love".
1955-1961	The Life and Legend of Wyatt Earp	Judge Spicer	16 Episodes
1958	Cheyenne	Duke Tavener	Episode "Gambler".
1964	Gunsmoke	Jay	Episode "Owney Tupper Had A Daughter"
1964	Death Valley Days	Sheriff Boden	Episode "The Bigger They Are"
1964	Death Valley Days	Bert Fletcher	Episode "Big John and the Rainmaker"
1964	Death Valley Days	Jake	Episode "The Lucky Cow "
1964	Death Valley Days	Marshal	Episode "The Left Hand Is Damned" (1964) ...
1965	Death Valley Days	Herman Ehrenberg	Episode "A City Is Born"
1966	Death Valley Days	Alex McSween	Episode "The Kid from Hell's Kitchen"
1967	Death Valley Days	Teck	Episode "The Lone Grave"
1968	Death Valley Days	Jim Bergmann	Episode "The Secret of the Black Prince"
1968	Death Valley Days	Editor	Episode "The World's Greatest Swimming Horse"
1970	Death Valley Days	Joe Grimes	Episode "Clum's Constabulary"
