= Robert Bice =

American actor (1914–1968)

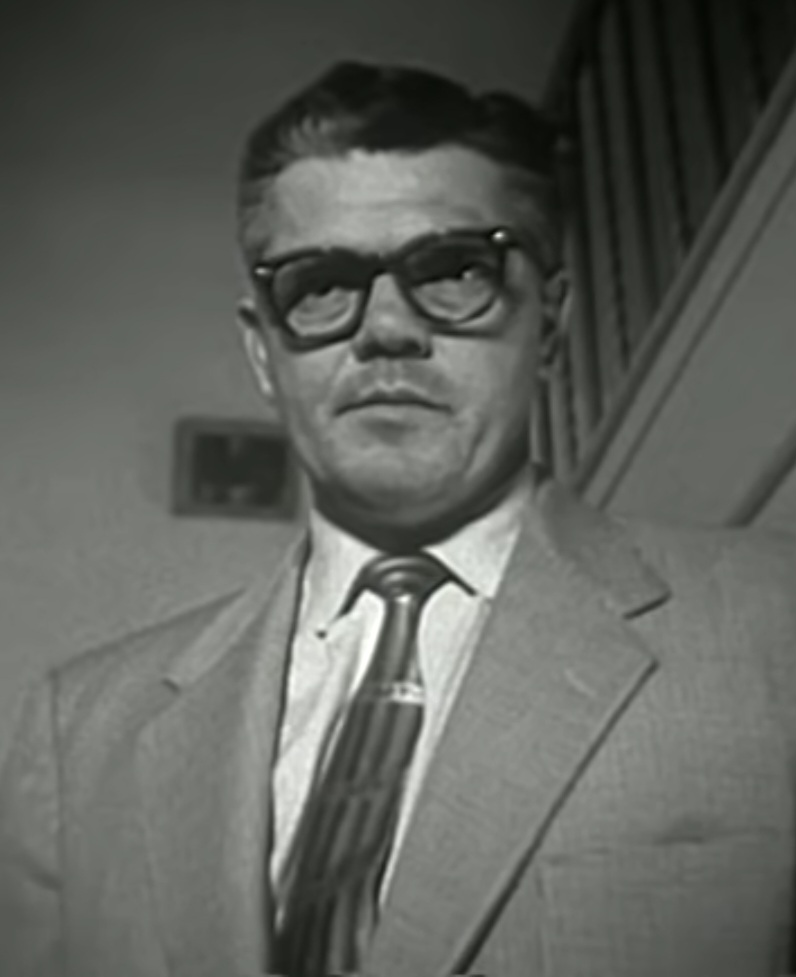
- Bice in The Big Bluff (1955)
- Born: March 14, 1914; Dallas, Texas, U.S.
- Died: January 8, 1968 (aged 53); Los Angeles, California
- Resting place: Eternal Valley Memorial Park, Newhall, Santa Clarita, California
- Occupation: Actor
- Years active: 1943–1967

Robert Bice (March 14, 1914 – January 8, 1968) was an American television and film actor.

== Biography ==
=== Birth ===
Bice was born on March 14, 1914, in Dallas, Texas.

=== Career ===
Bice appeared in 199 films and television programs between 1943 and 1967. His first film was the comedy horror The Ghost and the Guest (1943) and his career ended with four episodes in the popular western TV series Death Valley Days. Between 1957 and 1964 Bice made seven appearances on Perry Mason as Frank Faulkner, an operative for Mason's private detective Paul Drake.

Bice's television credits include The Lone Ranger (1950), The Cisco Kid (1951), The Public Defender (1954), Have Gun - Will Travel (1957), I Love Lucy (1957), M Squad (1957), Fury (1959), Peter Gunn (1960), Bat Masterson (1961), The Life and Legend of Wyatt Earp (1961), Rawhide (1961–62), The Rifleman (1959–62), The Untouchables (1961–62), Wagon Train (1959–62), Surfside 6 (1962) and Daniel Boone (1964–1970) and Gunsmoke.

=== Death ===
He died on January 8, 1968, in Los Angeles, California. Bice was buried in Eternal Valley Memorial Park in nearby Newhall.

== Selected filmography ==
- The Ghost and the Guest (1943) - Smoothie Lewis
- Appointment in Berlin (1943) - Radio Man (uncredited)
- Fighting Valley (1943) - Paul Jackson
- The Iron Major (1943) - High School Coach (uncredited)
- Gildersleeve on Broadway (1943) - Eddie, the Bellhop (uncredited)
- Gangway for Tomorrow (1943) - Stooge (uncredited)
- The Ghost Ship (1943) - Raphael - the Steward (uncredited)
- Passport to Destiny (1944) - German Troop Leader (uncredited)
- Dragon Seed (1944) - Lao Ta Tan - Eldest Son
- Thirty Seconds Over Tokyo (1944) - 'Jig' White
- G.I. War Brides (1946) - Bill Sears (uncredited)
- The Mysterious Mr. Valentine (1946) - Doctor
- The Beginning or the End (1947) - Co-Pilot (uncredited)
- The Sea of Grass (1947) - Brewton Ranch Hand (uncredited)
- The Bachelor and the Bobby-Soxer (1947) - Policeman at Airport (uncredited)
- The Red Stallion (1947) - Ho-Na
- Assigned to Danger (1948) - Frankie Mantell
- Raw Deal (1948) - Ship's Crewman (uncredited)
- Canon City (1948) - Morgan
- Hollow Triumph (1948) - Maxwell's Thug (uncredited)
- In This Corner (1948) - Cmdr. Harris
- Joan of Arc (1948) - Dying English Archer (uncredited)
- He Walked by Night (1948) - Detective with Capt. Breen (uncredited)
- Let's Live a Little (1948) - Elevator Operator (uncredited)
- Bride of Vengeance (1949) - Guard (uncredited)
- Susanna Pass (1949) - Bob Oliver
- Illegal Entry (1949) - Ken (uncredited)
- Too Late for Tears (1949) - Policeman (uncredited)
- Flaming Fury (1949) - Arthur Latch - Lab Technician (uncredited)
- Bandit King of Texas (1949) - Henchman Gus
- The James Brothers of Missouri (1949) - Frank James
- Thieves' Highway (1949) - Announcer (uncredited)
- Johnny Holiday (1949) - Policeman (uncredited)
- Life of St. Paul Series (1949) - Roman Soldier
- Bells of Coronado (1950) - Jim Russell
- Bunco Squad (1950) - Drake - aka The Swami
- Between Midnight and Dawn (1950) - Detective (uncredited)
- Hit Parade of 1951 (1950) - Cowboy (uncredited)
- The Jackpot (1950) - Policeman in Bookie Raid (uncredited)
- Under Mexicali Stars (1950) - Deputy Bob
- Counterspy Meets Scotland Yard (1950) - Agent Fields
- The Flying Missile (1950) - Airbase Military Police Officer (uncredited)
- Al Jennings of Oklahoma (1951) - Pete Kincaid
- Cry Danger (1951) - Castro's Gunman (uncredited)
- The Living Christ Series (1951, TV Series) - Matthew
- Tales of Robin Hood (1951) - Will Scarlet
- Gunplay (1951) - Sam Martin
- A Millionaire for Christy (1951) - Reporter with Tape Recorder (uncredited)
- The Well (1951) - Manager of Packard Construction Company (uncredited)
- The Racket (1951) - Police Dispatcher (uncredited)
- The Big Night (1951) - Taxi Driver (uncredited)
- Night Stage to Galveston (1952) - Captain Yancey
- Red Snow (1952) - Chief Nanu
- Loan Shark (1952) - Steve Casmer (uncredited)
- Desert Pursuit (1952) - Tomaso (uncredited)
- Cripple Creek (1952) - James Sullivan - Assayer (uncredited)
- Junction City (1952) - Bleaker
- Captain Pirate (1952) - Lieutenant (uncredited)
- Captive Women (1952) - Bram
- Horizons West (1952) - Townsman (uncredited)
- Invasion U.S.A. (1952) - George Sylvester
- Hiawatha (1952) - Wabeek
- Star of Texas (1953) - Henchman Al Slade
- The Blue Gardenia (1953) - Policeman (uncredited)
- On Top of Old Smoky (1953) - Kirby (uncredited)
- Port Sinister (1953) - George Burt
- The Marksman (1953) - Kincaid - Henchman
- The 49th Man (1953) - Detective (uncredited)
- Tarzan and the She-Devil (1953) - Maka, Vargo's Safari Boss (uncredited)
- Gun Belt (1953) - Wells Fargo Guard (uncredited)
- Bandits of the West (1953) - Henchman Dutch
- The Moonlighter (1953) - Bar X Man in Lynch Mob (uncredited)
- Paris Model (1953) - Jack Parmalee
- Man Crazy (1953) - Narrator (uncredited)
- The Wild One (1953) - Wilson (uncredited)
- Trader Tom of the China Seas (1954, Serial) - Payne (uncredited)
- The Golden Idol (1954) - Gate Guard (uncredited)
- Riot in Cell Block 11 (1954) - Cell Block Guard (uncredited)
- Yankee Pasha (1954) - Sentry (uncredited)
- Johnny Dark (1954) - Guard (uncredited)
- The Far Country (1954) - Miner (uncredited)
- The Adventures of Hajji Baba (1954) - Musa (uncredited)
- The Snow Creature (1954) - Fleet
- Sign of the Pagan (1954) - Chilothe
- The Violent Men (1954) - Tony (uncredited)
- Day of Triumph (1954) - Zealot (uncredited)
- The Steel Cage (1954) - Convict in Mess Hall (segment "The Chef")
- Bowery to Bagdad (1955) - Duke Dolan
- Many Rivers to Cross (1955) - Punishment Party Member (uncredited)
- Three for the Show (1955) - Sgt. Charlie O'Hallihan (uncredited)
- Dial Red O (1955) - Sgt. Tony Columbo
- The Big Bluff (1955) - Dr. Tom Harrison
- Foxfire (1955) - Walt Whitman
- The Gun That Won the West (1955) - Chief Red Cloud
- Trial (1955) - Abbott (uncredited)
- Teen-Age Crime Wave (1955) - Highway Patrol Officer Smith (uncredited)
- The Court-Martial of Billy Mitchell (1955) - Naval Officer Aide (uncredited)
- Over-Exposed (1956) - Patrolman Outside Office Building (uncredited)
- Calling Homicide (1956) - Det. Johnny Phipps (uncredited)
- The Ten Commandments (1956) - Sergeant (uncredited)
- The White Squaw (1956) - Cowhand (uncredited)
- Dance with Me, Henry (1956) - Policeman (uncredited)
- Hold That Hypnotist (1957) - Reporter (uncredited)
- The Helen Morgan Story (1957) - Guard (uncredited)
- Jailhouse Rock (1957) - Bardeman - TV Studio Manager (uncredited)
- Diamond Safari (1958) - Reubens
- Going Steady (1958) - Coach (uncredited)
- Space Master X-7 (1958) - Officer (uncredited)
- The Case Against Brooklyn (1958) - Policeman (uncredited)
- It! The Terror from Beyond Space (1958) - Maj. John Purdue
- The Buccaneer (1958) - Militia Man (uncredited)
- Revolt in the Big House (1958) - Guard (uncredited)
- Good Day for a Hanging (1959) - Griswald (uncredited)
- Ocean's 11 (1960) - Deputy (scenes deleted)
- Ada (1961) - Member of the State Legislature (uncredited)

== Television ==
Year	Title	Role	Notes
1961	Rawhide	George Kriegel	S3:E17, "Incident of the New Start"
1961	Rawhide	Rawley	S4:E4, "Judgement at Hondo Seco"
1965	Rawhide	Coats Watson	S7:E21, "The Winter Soldier"
