= Law of the Jungle (1942 film) =

1942 film by Jean Yarbrough

- Lobby card
- Directed by: Jean Yarbrough
- Written by: George Bricker (original screenplay); Edmond Kelso (additional dialogue)
- Produced by: Lindsley Parsons (producer)
- Starring: See below
- Cinematography: Mack Stengler
- Edited by: Jack Ogilvie
- Distributed by: Monogram Pictures
- Release date: 1942
- Running time: 61 minutes
- Country: United States
- Language: English

Law of the Jungle is a 1942 American adventure film directed by Jean Yarbrough.

== Plot ==
An American singer, Nona Brooks, is stranded at a hotel in a British West African colony (implicitly from dialogue, Sierra Leone) because her passport is missing. It turns out agents of Nazi Germany, in collaboration with corrupt/sleazy hotel owner Simmons, have stolen her papers, then try to use her for their nefarious schemes.

Brooks flees and encounters American paleontologist Larry Mason in the jungle. He and his assistant Jefferson Jones give her shelter, then fend off unfriendly natives while Simmons is murdered by the villainous German agents. All looks hopeless until the tribal chief turns out to be a reasonable, Oxford-educated man who helps Larry and Nona out of their jam.

== Cast ==
- Arline Judge as Nona Brooks
- John 'Dusty' King as Larry Mason
- Mantan Moreland as Jefferson 'Jeff' Jones
- Arthur O'Connell as Simmons
- C. Montague Shaw as Sgt. Burke
- Guy Kingsford as Constable Whiteside
- Laurence Criner as Chief Mojobo - an Oxford Graduate
- Victor Kendall as Grozman
- Feodor Chaliapin, Jr. as Belts
- Martin Wilkins as Bongo

== Soundtrack ==
- Arline Judge - "Jungle Moon" (Written by Edward J. Kay as Edward Kay)
