= Harry Bluestone =

British-American composer and violinist (1907–1992)

- Bluestone playing his violin

Background information
- Born: 30 September 1907; England, UK
- Origin: New York, US
- Died: 22 December 1992 (aged 85) Studio City, California, US
- Occupations: Composer; conductor; violinist
- Instrument: Violin
- Years active: 1913–1987

Harry Bluestone (30 September 1907 – 22 December 1992) was a British-American composer and violinist who composed music for TV and film. He was prolific and worked mainly on composing with Emil Cadkin. Earlier on, he was a violinist and freelanced on radio in the 1930s with Artie Shaw, Benny Goodman and the Dorsey Brothers. Some of his compositions were also featured on APM Music.

== Early life ==
Harry was born in England on 30 September 1907 and apparently went to New York as a boy. He took up the violin at a young age, and the liner notes on his Artistry in Jazz album reveal "he performed the Bruch G-Minor Violin Concerto to critical acclaim when only 7 years old." As a teenager, he travelled to Paris with a small jazz group to back up expatriate singer Josephine Baker. Harry graduated from the Institute of Musical Art (later renamed Juilliard School), and freelanced on numerous radio programmes in the 1930s with the Dorsey Brothers, Benny Goodman and Artie Shaw. He played with Bix Beiderbecke, Bunny Berigan and Red Nichols (who had in his employ a future cartoon sound genius named Treg Brown).

== Career ==
Harry moved to Hollywood in 1935 with the Lennie Hayton Orchestra, which had been known as the Ipana Troubadors on Fred Allen's Show in New York, when it became the first orchestra on Your Hit Parade (eventually replaced in 1939 by the Raymond Scott). Bluestone had his own 15-minute radio show, recorded for Brunswick Records and was hired by Paramount Studios as its concertmaster. He enlisted in the Air Force in 1942, rose to the rank of Master Sergeant and organised both the Army Air Force Orchestra and the Army Air Force Training Command Orchestra that replaced Glenn Miller, who went overseas to his eventual death.

After the war, Bluestone set up his own orchestra which backed Jo Stafford and Dinah Shore. He also got a first taste of the music library business as production manager for Standard Transcriptions. Among his discoveries while recording in France (to get around Jimmy Petrillo's union) was singer Robert Clary, who later co-starred on Hogan's Heroes. Bluestone spent the rest of his life setting up various music publishing houses, writing and getting out his baton or violin, as a heavily in-demand "first chair" to work on hundreds of albums by a wide variety of artists, including the Beach Boys, Peggy Lee, Dolly Parton, Lionel Richie, and Stevie Wonder. He also wrote books in the 1980s on playing violin, guitar and trumpet.

Bluestone lived with his wife "Le Bluestone". He died of complications of Parkinson's disease in 1992.

== Filmography ==
=== Television ===
2008:

- Juro que te amo

2005:

- Camp Lazlo

1999:

- SpongeBob SquarePants

1956:

- Judge Roy Bean

==== TV movies ====
2004:

- 30 Days Until I'm Famous

2003:

- Ren & Stimpy "Adult Party Cartoon" (Mini-Series)

1991:

- Sherlock Holmes and the Leading Lady

=== Movies ===
2010:

- The Back up Plan

2009:

- Autopsy of the Dead

2007:

- Blades of Glory

2004:

- Jiminy Glick in Lalawood

2003:

- In America

2002:

- Frida

1968:

- Night of the Living Dead

1965:

- Mara of the Wilderness

1959:

- The Killer Shrews

1958:

- The Invisible Avenger
- Space Master X-7

1957:

- Journey to Freedom

=== Shorts ===
2007:

- Te quiero ver muerta

1958:

- Gopher Broke
- Hook, Line and Stinker

==== Video games ====
2010:

- Fallout: New Vegas

== Discography ==
=== With Vito Mumolo ===
- Artistry in Jazz (Dobre Records DR1011, 1978)
