= The Falcon in Hollywood =

1944 film by Gordon Douglas

- Film poster
- Directed by: Gordon Douglas
- Screenplay by: Gerald Geraghty
- Based on: Characters created by Michael Arlen
- Produced by: Maurice Geraghty; Gordon Douglas
- Starring: Tom Conway; Barbara Hale; Jean Brooks; Rita Corday
- Cinematography: Nicholas Musuraca
- Edited by: Gene Milford
- Music by: C. Bakaleinikoff
- Production company: RKO Radio Pictures Inc.
- Distributed by: RKO Radio Pictures
- Release date: December 8, 1944
- Running time: 67 minutes
- Country: United States
- Language: English
- Box office: $115,000 (profit)

The Falcon in Hollywood is a 1944 crime film directed by Gordon Douglas and stars Tom Conway in his recurring role as a suave amateur sleuth, supported by Barbara Hale, Jean Brooks, and Rita Corday. The film was the 10th of 16 in The Falcon detective series, produced and released by RKO Radio Pictures.

== Plot ==
Tom Lawrence, known to the police as the "amateur detective" The Falcon, is enjoying his vacation at the Hollywood Park Racetrack. There he meets an old nemesis, paroled mobster Louie Buchanan -- the Falcon's testimony in court convicted him. Local police inspector McBride greets the Falcon suspiciously, and two strange women impose upon the suave sleuth, resulting in one stealing a purse from the other.

The Falcon hails a cab, driven by devil-may-care Billie Atkins, and follows the thief to the Sunset Studios movie lot. Billie also works in the film industry as a stunt driver, and is already familiar with the studio layout. Hearing a gunshot, the Falcon rushes to a deserted sound stage, where he finds a corpse; when he summons a studio guard, the body has disappeared. The sleuth, accompanied by Billie, pokes around the studio and finds various clues in unusual hiding places, including the missing corpse: Ted Miles, the leading man in the studio's major production, supervised by neurotic studio executive Martin Dwyer.

The suspects are struggling starlet Peggy Callahan, haughty prima donna Lili D'Alio, the gangster Louie Buchanan, autocratic director Alec Hoffman, costume designer Roxanna (once married to the deceased), and the producer Martin Dwyer. The Falcon deduces plausible motives for these suspicious characters, and even confronts each of them with his revelations.

After the death of the leading man, one disaster after another befalls the jinxed movie production, to the beleaguered producer's agony. The Falcon, knowing that someone is sabotaging the production, finds an important clue. Interpreting the clue correctly, the sleuth confronts the saboteur, who races desperately into a darkened sound stage and tries to escape in the catwalks high above the stage. The Falcon risks his life but solves the case.

== Cast ==
- Tom Conway as Tom Lawrence
- Barbara Hale as Peggy Callahan
- Jean Brooks as Roxanna Miles
- Rita Corday as Lili D'Alio
- Veda Ann Borg as Billie Atkins
- John Abbott as Martin S. Dwyer
- Sheldon Leonard as Louie Buchanan
- Konstantin Shayne as Alec Hoffman
- Emory Parnell as Inspector McBride
- Frank Jenks as Lieutenant Higgins
- Walter Soderling as Ed Johnson, studio guard
- Chester Clute as Hotel manager
- Useff Ali as Mohammed Nogari
- Robert Clarke as Perc Saunders, assistant director
- Carl Kent as Art director
- Gwen Crawford as Secretary
- Patti Brill as Secretary
- Bryant Washburn as Actor's agent
- Sammy Blum as Actor's agent
- Greta Christensen as Girl
- Margie Stewart as Girl
- Virginia Belmont as Girl
- Nancy Marlow as Mail clerk
- Chris Drake as Assistant cameraman
- Jimmy Jordan as Operator
- George De Normand as Truck driver
- Perc Launders as Zoller, plaster artisan
- Jacques Lory as Musician
- Chili Williams as Beautiful blonde

== Production ==
Many studios suffered the same problem in 1944: much of their male personnel -- actors and technicians alike -- had been claimed by the armed forces. Accordingly, almost all of the young players in The Falcon in Hollywood are women, with the male contingent consisting almost entirely of older character actors. The notable exception is screen newcomer Robert Clarke, just signed by RKO and exempted from military service due to an asthmatic condition.

The RKO production facilities doubled for the fictional Sunset Studio.

== Reception ==
Most trade reviewers predicted that The Falcon in Hollywood was up to the series standard, and would probably earn more money than its predecessors because of its attractive title. They were right: The Falcon in Hollywood was one of the most popular entries in the series, posting a $115,000 profit (about $2,135,000 in 2026 dollars). Elisabeth A. Cunningham of Motion Picture Herald wrote, "Here are two packages in one for the exhibitor. The first one, to be expected from the title. is another mystery comedy featuring Tom Conway as the Falcon and a group of pretty girls as suspects and accomplices. The second and highly exploitable one is a visit to a Hollywood studio lot during working hours." The Exhibitor agreed: "With the Hollywood background as an added angle, this will fit into the lower half [of double-feature programs]. It holds to the series average, with production, direction, and performances up to the usual standard." Film Daily noted, "The title carries a promise of melodrama tinged with glamour and that promise has been well kept. The result is a film that has considerable interest apart from its story elements. The story is an ordinary affair indebted considerably to the nonchalance of Tom Conway. The Falcon sets about solving the case in the casual manner typical of him."

In a recent review of the Falcon series for the Time Out Film Guide, Tom Milne wrote, "Conway, bringing a lighter touch to the series (which managed its comic relief better than most), starred in nine films after The Falcon's Brother, most of them deft and surprisingly enjoyable."

== External list ==
- The Falcon in Hollywood at the AFI Catalog of Feature Films
- The Falcon in Hollywood at the TCM Movie Database (archived)
- The Falcon in Hollywood at IMDb
- Review of film at Variety
