= The Red Stallion =

1947 film by Lesley Selander

- Theatrical release poster
- Directed by: Lesley Selander
- Written by: Robert E. Kent (screenplay) and Crane Wilbur (screenplay)
- Produced by: Benjamin Stoloff (producer)
- Starring: Robert Paige; Noreen Nash; Ted Donaldson; Jane Darwell; Pierre Watkin
- Cinematography: Virgil Miller
- Edited by: Fred Allen
- Music by: Friedrich Hollaender
- Production company: Ben Stoloff Productions
- Distributed by: Eagle-Lion Films; Rozdelovna Filmu Ceskoslovenského Státního Filmu (1947) (Czechoslovakia); Union-Film (1953) (West Germany); Comet Video (DVD)
- Release date: August 16, 1947
- Running time: 81 minutes 92 minutes (West Germany)
- Country: United States
- Language: English
- Budget: $1.3 million or $1.1 million

The Red Stallion is a 1947 American Western film directed by Lesley Selander shot in Cinecolor. It is about a young boy who trains his beloved pet horse to be a racehorse in order to save his grandmother's farm from foreclosure. It was filmed at Mount Shasta and the Shasta Starr Ranch in northern California.

== Plot ==
Joel Curtis is a young orphan who is living with his grandmother, Aggie Curtis, on her ranch. Joel finds an orphaned colt in the nearby woods, and names the horse Red. Joel learns that Grandma Curtis has extensive debts, and will be forced to sell her ranch to pay them off. Joel is friends with Andy McBride, a ranch hand at the nearby Moresby Farms. Joel convinces Andy to help him train Red as a racehorse, with the intention of selling his beloved horse to pay off his grandmother's debts.

Joel and Andy convinced Moresby Farms horse trainer Ellen Reynolds to race Red against the farm's best racehorse, Black Moor. But the untrained Red loses the race because he does not stay close to the inside rail. Joel next approaches Mr. Moresby with an offer to sell horses from the Curtis ranch to Moresby Farms. Mr. Moresby agrees, but says he will buy only those horses which can outrace Black Moor. With the foreclosure auction on Grandma Curtis' farm approaching quickly, Joel and Ho-Na, a Native American working for Grandma Curtis, train Red on Moresby's racetrack nightly. Joel's dog, Curley, helps by barking at Red and forcing the horse against the rail whenever Red tries to stray.

Moresby promises to see Red race one more time first thing in the morning on the day before the auction. But that night, Red escapes the barn and goes into the woods, where a bear attacks him. Red escapes, but is too exhausted to race. The next day, Joel races Red against Black Moor and beats Moresby's horse. Moresby purchases Red for a large sum, saving Grandma Curtis' ranch. At Grandma Curtis' suggestion, Moresby makes Joel co-owner of Red. Andy and Ellen reveal they are in love.

== Cast ==
- Robert Paige as Andy McBride
- Noreen Nash as Ellen Reynolds
- Ted Donaldson as Joel Curtis
- Jane Darwell as Mrs. Aggie Curtis
- Ray Collins as Perry Barton
- Guy Kibbee as Ed Thompson
- Willie Best as Jackson
- Robert Bice as Ho-Na
- Pierre Watkin as Richard Moresby
- Bill Cartledge as Johnny Stevens
- Daisy as Curley the dog

== See also ==
- List of films about horses
- List of films about horse racing
