= Mary Meade =

American actress (1923–2003)

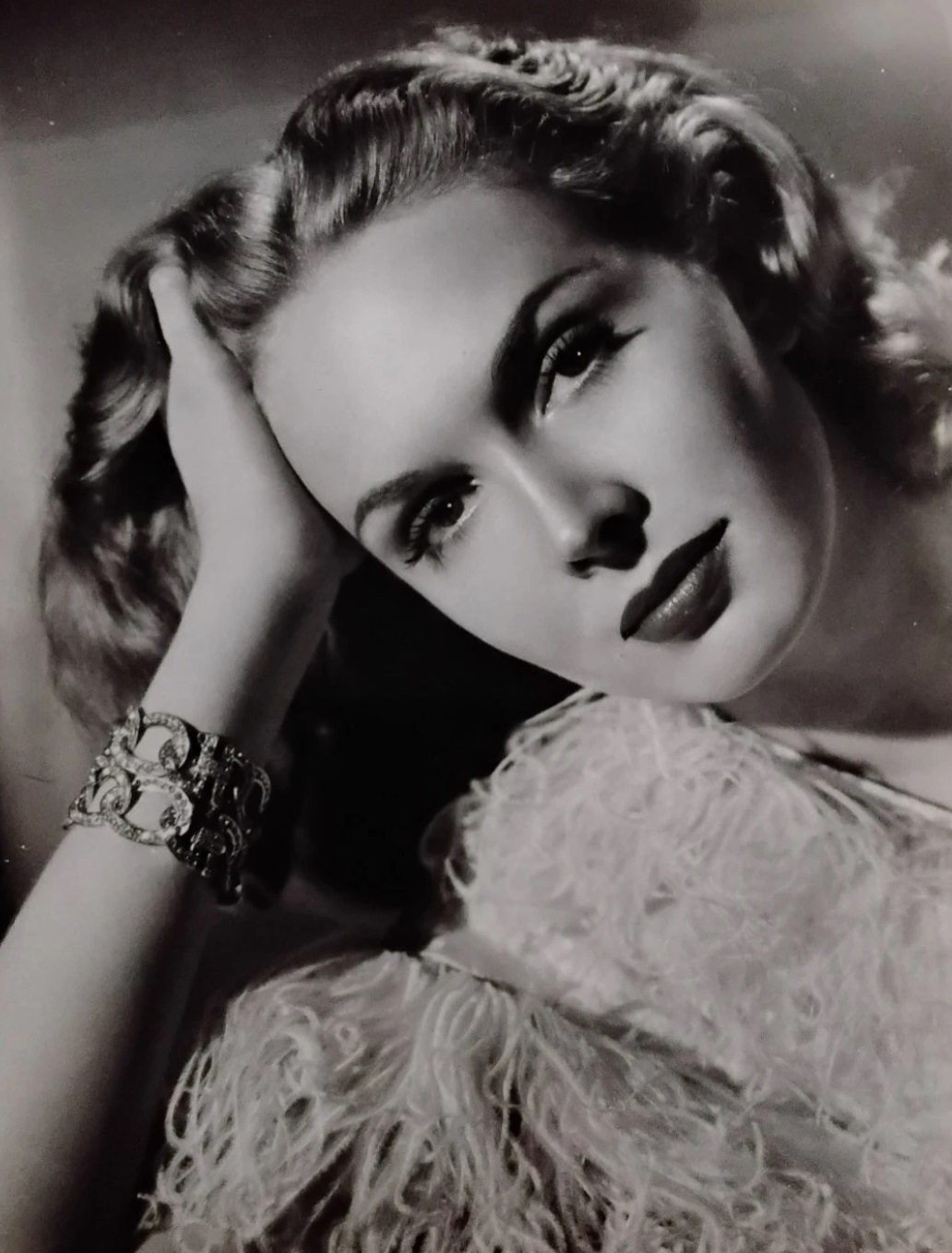
- Meade in T-Men (1947)
- Born: November 24, 1923; Louisiana, U.S.
- Died: December 10, 2003 (aged 80); Apple Valley, California, U.S.
- Occupation: Film actress
- Years active: 1944–1950
- Spouse(s): Ted Grouya (1949-1955); Dick Bremerkamp (1973-2001) (his death)

Mary Meade (November 24, 1923 – December 10, 2003) was an American film actress who rose to fame in the latter 1940s.

Born in Louisiana, her first role was in Wonder Man (1945), as a Goldwyn Girl. In 1949, she married Ted Grouya in Paris and embarked on a European career that included stints in the lavish production Gay Paris at the Casino de Paris (1951), and at the Pigalle Club in London. Back in the United States she performed in venues such as the Waldorf-Astoria Hotel and in 1953 was selected as one of the nation's 15 best-dressed women by the New York Fashion Academy. One of her last public performances was for Germaine Monteil's cosmetics.

Meade was also married to director Dick Bremerkamp.

== Filmography ==
- Show Business (1944)
- Wonder Man (1945)
- The Thrill of Brazil (1946)
- T-Men (1947)
- In This Corner (1948)
- Assigned to Danger (1948)
