= The Steel Cage =

1954 film by Walter Doniger

- Theatrical release poster
- Directed by: Walter Doniger
- Screenplay by: Oliver Crawford; Walter Doniger; Scott Littleton; Berman Swarttz; Guy Trosper
- Based on: The San Quentin Story by Clinton T. Duffy; Dean Jennings
- Produced by: Walter Doniger; Berman Swarttz
- Starring: Paul Kelly; Maureen O'Sullivan; Walter Slezak; John Ireland; Lawrence Tierney; Arthur Franz
- Cinematography: John Alton; Joseph F. Biroc
- Edited by: Everett Dodd; Chester W. Schaeffer
- Production company: Swarttz-Doniger Productions
- Distributed by: United Artists
- Release date: December 1954
- Running time: 80 minutes
- Country: United States
- Language: English

The Steel Cage is a 1954 American film noir drama film directed by Walter Doniger, written by Oliver Crawford, Walter Doniger, Scott Littleton, Berman Swarttz and Guy Trosper, and starring Paul Kelly, Maureen O'Sullivan, Walter Slezak, John Ireland, Lawrence Tierney and Arthur Franz. It was released in December 1954, by United Artists.

== Plot ==
In three separate stories, San Quentin warden Duffy must contend with a crisis at the prison.

Louis, a prison cook, is about to be paroled, upsetting fellow inmate Brenner, who loves Louis's food so much that he tries to bribe him to stay behind bars. After that plan fails, a customer comes to a restaurant where Louis has been hired as chef. His insults about the dishes are so insulting, Louis smashes a plate over his head, breaking his parole. Behind prison walls again, Louis learns that Brenner's the one who sent the customer, Lee Filbert, who is now a San Quentin prisoner himself.

Ruthless convict Chet Harmon plans a breakout with help from brothers Al and Frank. A gun is planted and Chet is almost successful, taking Warden Duffy hostage, but Al has second thoughts after his brother is seriously wounded.

A mural of The Last Supper needs repair in the prison's chapel, so chaplain Harvey asks an artistically inclined inmate named Steinberg to do the restoration. Two other prisoners are sneaking in liquor through the chapel, so Steinberg demands a piece of their action. They end up taking the priest hostage as Duffy deals with a deadly confrontation.

== Cast ==
- Paul Kelly as Warden Clinton T. Duffy
- Maureen O'Sullivan as Gladys Duffy
- Walter Slezak as Louis
- John Ireland as Al
- Lawrence Tierney as Chet Harmon
- Arthur Franz as Chaplain Harvey
- Kenneth Tobey as Steinberg
- George Cooper as Charlie Rivers
- Alan Mowbray as Lee Filbert
- George E. Stone as Solly
- Lyle Talbot as Square
- Elisabeth Fraser as Marie
- Stanley Andrews as Roy
- Morris Ankrum as Prison Board Member Garvey
- Don Beddoe as Prison Board Member Alan Ferness
- Robert Bice as Convict in Mess Hall
- George Chandler as Shorty Lanning
- Ned Glass as Pete
- Herb Jacobs as Convict
- Henry Kulky as George
- Charles Nolte as Frank
- Gene Roth as Billy Brenner
- James Seay as Dr. Perry
- Charles Tannen as Convict Patient
- Ben Welden as Mike
