= The Tender Years =

1948 film by Harold D. Schuster

- Theatrical release poster
- Directed by: Harold D. Schuster
- Screenplay by: Arnold Belgard; Abem Finkel; Jack Jungmeyer
- Story by: Jack Jungmeyer
- Produced by: Edward L. Alperson
- Starring: Joe E. Brown; Richard Lyon; Noreen Nash; Charles Drake; Josephine Hutchinson; James Millican
- Cinematography: Henry Freulich
- Edited by: Richard W. Farrell
- Music by: Edward Kilenyi
- Production company: 20th Century Fox
- Distributed by: 20th Century Fox
- Release date: January 3, 1948
- Running time: 81 minutes
- Country: United States
- Language: English

The Tender Years is a 1948 American drama film directed by Harold D. Schuster, written by Arnold Belgard, Abem Finkel and Jack Jungmeyer, and starring Joe E. Brown, Richard Lyon, Noreen Nash, Charles Drake, Josephine Hutchinson and James Millican. It was released on January 3, 1948, by 20th Century Fox.

== Cast ==
- Joe E. Brown as Rev. Will Norris
- Richard Lyon as Ted Norris
- Noreen Nash as Linda
- Charles Drake as Bob Wilson
- Josephine Hutchinson as Emily Norris
- James Millican as Kit Barton
- Griff Barnett as Sen. Cooper
- Jeanne Gail as Jeanie
- Harry Cheshire as Sheriff Fred Ackley
- Blayney Lewis as Frank Barton
- Jimmie Dodd as Spike
