= Kidnapped (1948 film) =

1948 film by William Beaudine

- Directed by: William Beaudine
- Screenplay by: Scott Darling
- Based on: Kidnapped; 1886 novel by Robert Louis Stevenson
- Produced by: Lindsley Parsons; Roddy McDowall
- Starring: Roddy McDowall; Sue England; Dan O'Herlihy
- Cinematography: William A. Sickner
- Edited by: Ace Herman
- Music by: Edward J. Kay; Dave Torbett
- Production company: Lindsley Parsons Picture Corporation
- Distributed by: Monogram Pictures
- Release date: November 28, 1948
- Running time: 81 minutes
- Country: United States
- Language: English

Kidnapped is a 1948 American historical adventure film directed by William Beaudine and starring Roddy McDowall, Sue England and Dan O'Herlihy. It is based on the 1886 novel of the same name by Robert Louis Stevenson. The former child star McDowall plays David Balfour in the story about a young man cheated out of his birthright by his wicked, covetous uncle Ebenezer (Houseley Stevenson).

== Plot ==
Scotland, 1751: At a stately manor near Edinburgh, the young David Balfour arrives with a sealed letter from his recently deceased father for Ebenezer, his uncle. It is meant to be delivered to a family lawyer to introduce David as the rightful heir to the property.

After slyly trying to kill his previously unknown nephew but failing, Ebenezer conspires with a sea captain, Hoseason, to take the boy hostage and sell him into slavery. A prisoner aboard ship, David soon meets Alan Breck, who, in need of rescue, now finds himself in danger of Hoseason stealing his gold and perhaps murdering him as well. David's quick intervention saves his life.

Washed up ashore after a storm, David is hidden by an innkeeper's daughter, Aileen, then begins a long and arduous journey home. With the help of Alan, he is able to coerce a confession about the kidnapping from his uncle that is overheard by the lawyer, who now knows David to be the proper heir. Hoseason, feeling betrayed, tries to kill Ebenezer in a sword fight, resulting in the deaths of both.

== Cast ==
Actor	Role
Roddy McDowall	David Balfour
Sue England	Aileen Fairlie
Dan O'Herlihy	Alan Breck
Roland Winters	Capt. Hoseason
Jeff Corey	Shuan
Houseley Stevenson	Ebenezer
Erskine Sanford	Rankeillor
Alex Frazer	Hugh Fairlie
Winifriede McDowall	Innkeeper's Wife
Robert J. Anderson	Ransome
Janet Murdoch	Janet Clouston
Olaf Hytten	The Red Fox
Erville Alderson	Mungo
Mary Gordon	Scotswoman
Hugh O'Brian	Sailor
Eric Wilton	Rankeillor's Secretary
Jimmie Dodd	Scottish Sailor

== Production ==
McDowall performed a radio version of the novel in 1946 with Douglas Fairbanks Jr.

In 1948 McDowall was making a series of films for Monogram Pictures on which McDowall would star and executive produce. They selected Kidnapped. Dan O'Herlihy, who had just appeared in Orson Welles' Macbeth was signed to play Alan Breck. Filming started on Santa Catalina in May 1948. The film unit used James Cagney's yacht, the Swift. Studio work took place at Nassour Studios.

Monogram considered making a sequel, David Balfour, also starring McDowall. It was meant to follow Tuna Clipper, the next McDowall-Parsons-Monogram film. However this did not eventuate.
