= Noreen Nash =

American actress (1924–2023)

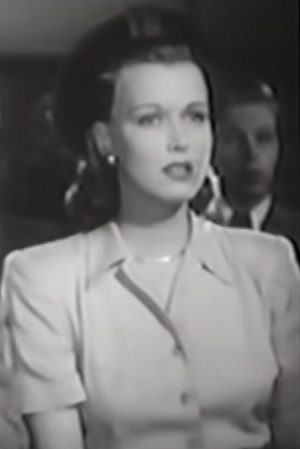
- Nash in 1947
- Born: Norabelle Jean Roth; April 4, 1924; Wenatchee, Washington, U.S.
- Died: June 6, 2023 (aged 99); Beverly Hills, California, U.S.
- Occupations: Actress, model, writer
- Years active: 1943–1962 (actress), 1980–2015 (writer)
- Known for: The Southerner; Giant; The Red Stallion
- Spouses: Dr. Lee Edward Siegel (m. 1942; died 1990) James Whitmore (m. 2001; died 2009)
- Children: 2, including Lee Siegel Jr.

Norabelle Jean Roth (April 4, 1924 – June 6, 2023), known professionally as Noreen Nash, was an American film and television actress who after working as a model had a two-decade long career during the Classical Hollywood Cinema era. In the beginning of her career, she had uncredited parts at MGM. In 1945, she appeared in The Southerner, after which she had mostly leading roles in B movies of the late 1940s and 1950s, such as The Red Stallion (1947), The Checkered Coat (1948), and Phantom from Space (1953). After leaving the acting profession in 1962, she attended college and became a writer, publishing several books.

== Early life ==
Nash was born Norabelle Jean Roth on April 4, 1924, in Wenatchee, Washington. Her parents were Albert, who was in the beverage industry, and Gail Roth, a teacher. Gail died in 1998, at the age of 99.

== Early Hollywood career ==
Nash's career started in 1942, when she was crowned ”Apple Blossom Queen” in her home town. With help from Louis Shurr, Bob Hope’s agent, she entered showbusiness and eventually got a contract with MGM as a showgirl. She initially declined, since she had planned to attend Stanford University. She had previously tested for Warner Brothers, but wasn't signed. In 1942, she worked as a model alongside Marilyn Monroe. Her screen debut came in the 1943 musical film Girl Crazy, which starred Mickey Rooney and Judy Garland. Her MGM contract lapsed in 1944, having had mostly bit parts and appearing as a showgirl.

A 1945 newspaper article reported Nash being helped by actress Paulette Goddard. Goddard, the article said, was "sponsoring the career of shapely, brunette, blue-eyed and very beautiful Noreen Nash." The article added that her screen tests at Paramount Pictures were "arranged through the instigation of Paulette". As a result, Noreen was signed to a term contract.

Uncredited in her first movies, Nash eventually landed a role in director Jean Renoir's 1945 film The Southerner as farmer Henry's daughter Becky Devers. The film was nominated in three categories at the 18th Academy Awards in 1946. During this time, she changed her screen surname to Nash, inspired by her father in the film, J. Carroll Naish. She and Renoir remained friends for the rest of his life.

== Leading roles in B-movies ==
In 1947, Nash started having significant roles in poverty row films. She played Judge Roger Tanner's daughter Sue in the Producers Releasing Corporation (PRC) low-budget street racing cautionary tale The Devil on Wheels, which starred Darryl Hickman. She and Terry Moore are believed to be the first actresses to wear bikini tops on screen. Later that year, she had one of the leading roles in The Big Fix (1947) as Ann Taylor, about gamblers trying to rig a basketball game. It featured Sheila Ryan and James Brown, and was director James Flood's penultimate film before his death in 1953. She was the leading lady in the Eagle-Lion Films Western Cinecolor film The Red Stallion (1947). She played horse trainer Ellen Reynolds, with Ted Donaldson and Robert Paige as the other top-billed actors.

Nash played the role of Linda in the 20th Century Fox Joe E. Brown drama The Tender Years (1948). It was set in the 19th century. She played Zanetta in the American-Mexican Eagle-Lion historical adventure film Adventures of Casanova (1948). It also featured Arturo de Córdova, Lucille Bremer, and Turhan Bey. She was cast as the leading lady in the Eagle-Lion film noir Assigned to Danger (1948), where she played criminal Nip's sister Bonnie Powers, opposite Gene Raymond.

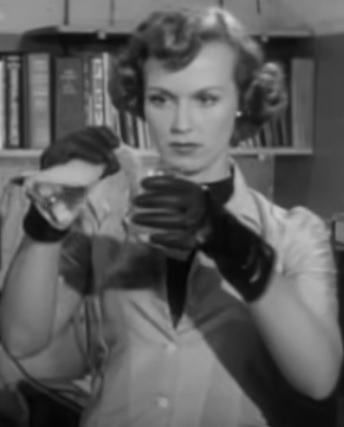
Nash in Phantom from Space (1953)

Although the film was described by writer Robert Nott as one of Budd Boetticher's worst, Nash considered him to be "the best director [she] ever worked with", praising the way he worked with the actors on set. She was the leading lady in the 20th Century Fox drama The Checkered Coat (1948), playing psychiatrist Dr. Michael Madden's (played by Tom Conway) wife Betty.

Nash played ranch owner Chris Marvin in the RKO Pictures Western Storm Over Wyoming (1950). The film also starred Tim Holt and Richard Martin. She worked with both of them a couple of years later in the same genre in Road Agent (1952). She played Cora Drew, daughter of rancher George Drew. She played scientist Barbara Randall in the 1953 independent science fiction Phantom from Space. One of her most noted films was one about a ranch owner, Giant (1956), in which she played the film star Lona Lane.

== Television career ==
Some of the television series in which Nash appeared include Hopalong Cassidy, The Lone Ranger, The Abbott and Costello Show and 77 Sunset Strip.

== Post-acting career ==
Nash retired from acting in 1962, having been encouraged to do so by her youngest son. She attended UCLA, majoring in history, and graduated with a Bachelor's degree in 1971.

== Publishing ==
Nash published the novel By Love Fulfilled in 1980, which was about a doctor in the 16th century. It was partly based on the Flemish anatomist and physician Vesalius. In 2013, she published another book, titled Agnes Sorèl, Mistress of Beauty. In 2015, she and Jeanne Rejaunier published Titans of The Muses: When Henry Miller Met Jean Renoir; she had worked with Renoir on The Southerner, and she was also friends with the American novelist Henry Miller.

== Personal life ==
Nash married Dr. Lee Siegel on December 12, 1942, in Las Vegas, after only having known each other for little over a month. They had two sons, Lee Siegel Jr., a novelist and religion professor, and Robert James Siegel, a cardiologist. Dr. Siegel worked as a medical director at the film studio 20th Century Fox. He died on May 7, 1990. In 2001, she married actor James Whitmore, who died in 2009. Nash was Jewish and was a frequent visitor at the Jewish Home for the Aged in Boyle Heights, California.

Nash's brother Albert was married to actress Susan Hart's sister. According to Hart, it was Nash's beauty that inspired her to become an actress as well.

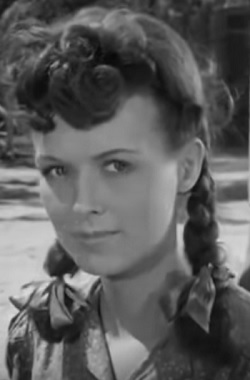
Nash in The Southerner (1945)

=== Death ===
Nash died at her home in Beverly Hills, California, on June 6, 2023, at the age of 99. Her home was put on the market at $16.5 million in January 2025.

== Filmography ==
Year	Title	Role	Director	Notes
1943	Girl Crazy	Showgirl	Norman Taurog	Uncredited
1944	Meet the People	Showgirl	Charles Reisner	Uncredited
1944	Maisie Goes to Reno	Good-looking girl	Harry Beaumont	Uncredited
1944	Bathing Beauty	Noreen - Co-ed	George Sidney	Uncredited
1944	An American Romance	Vaudeville act	King Vidor	Uncredited
1944	Mrs. Parkington	Bridget	Tay Garnett	Uncredited
1944	Thirty Seconds Over Tokyo	Lt. Bob Gray's girlfriend	Mervyn LeRoy	Scenes deleted
1945	The Southerner	Becky Devers	Jean Renoir	
1945	Ziegfeld Follies	Ziegfeld girl	Vincente Minnelli	Uncredited
1946	Monsieur Beaucaire	Baroness	George Marshall	Uncredited
1947	The Devil on Wheels	Sue Tanner	Crane Wilbur	
1947	The Big Fix	Ann Taylor	James Flood	First leading role
1947	The Perils of Pauline		George Marshall	Uncredited
1947	The Red Stallion	Ellen Reynolds	Lesley Selander	
1948	The Tender Years	Linda	Harold D. Schuster	
1948	Adventures of Casanova	Zanetta	Roberto Gavaldón	
1948	Assigned to Danger	Bonnie Powers	Budd Boetticher	
1948	The Checkered Coat	Betty Madden	Edward L. Cahn	
1950	Storm over Wyoming	Chris Marvin	Lesley Selander	
1950	Charlie's Haunt	Sally		
1952	Aladdin and His Lamp	Passion flower	Lew Landers	
1952	Road Agent	Cora Drew	Lesley Selander	
1952	We're Not Married!	Girl in Hector's daydream	Edmund Goulding	Uncredited
1953	Phantom from Space	Barbara Randall	W. Lee Wilder	
1953	The Body Beautiful	Laurie	Max Nosseck	
1956	Giant	Lona Lane	George Stevens	
1958	The Lone Ranger and the Lost City of Gold	Mrs. Frances Henderson	Lesley Selander	
1960	Wake Me When It's Over	Marge Brubaker	Mervyn LeRoy	

== Television credits ==
Year	Title	Role	Notes
1951	Fireside Theatre		"Going Home"
1952	Hopalong Cassidy	Noreen Thomas	"Don Colorado"
1952–1955	Four Star Playhouse	Kathy/Leonora/Salesgirl	3 episodes
1953	Your Favorite Story		"The Gold Bug"
1953	The Lone Ranger	Marianne Mornay	"A Stage for Mademoiselle"
1953	My Hero	Peggy Buchanan	"Cinderella's Revenge"
1953	Big Town		"The Big Cheat"
1953	Ramar of the Jungle	Nancy Barton	"The Unknown Terror"
1953	City Detective	Louise	"The Rebel"
1954	The Abbott and Costello Show	June Thomas	"Fall Guy"
1955	My Little Margie	Countess Louise DuBois	"Countess Margie"
1955–1957	Schlitz Playhouse of Stars	Mary Gerski	"Pattern for Death" "Ambitious Cop"
1956	Dragnet		"The Big Slug"
1956	It's a Great Life	Thelma Adams	"The Yachting Party"
1956	The Charles Farrell Show	Doris Mayfield	6 episodes
1956–1958	The Lineup		"The Vanishing Writer Case" "The Madcap McGee Case"
1957	State Trooper	Cynthia Hayes	"The Dancing Dowager"
1958–1959	Yancy Derringer	Agatha Colton	"Fire on the Frontier" "The Belle from Boston"
1959	77 Sunset Strip	Lisa Reynolds	"In Memoriam"
1960	General Electric Theater	Carol	"R.S.V.P"
1962	The Dick Powell Show	Woman #1	"Crazy Sunday"

== Works ==
- By Love Fulfilled (1980)
- Agnès Sorel, Mistress of Beauty (2013)
- The Paris Diet (2015)
- Titans of the Muses: When Henry Miller Met Jean Renoir (2015)
