= Don't Ask Don't Tell (film) =

- Directed by: Doug Miles
- Written by: Tex Hauser
- Produced by: Jackie Eagan
- Starring: Lloyd Floyd; Erik Frandsen (voice); Martin Friedrichs; Peter Graves; Steve Lippe; Michael McCurry; Greg Roman; Rosa Rugosa (voice); Johanna Saum
- Cinematography: George Gibson
- Edited by: Jackie Eagan
- Music by: Bruce Engler; Spencer Miles; Raj Haldar; The Sophisticuffs; Curmudgeon Boy; Left Field; Frenchy Burrito
- Distributed by: Lifesize Entertainment
- Release date: 2002
- Running time: 80 minutes
- Country: United States
- Language: English

Don't Ask Don't Tell is a 2002 parody film directed by Doug Miles and written by famed gay screenwriter Tex Hauser. The 2002 winner of the Boston Underground Film Festival (BUFF) Bachus Award and the Neuchatel Sci-Fi Fest Audience Choice Award, the film was created by taking an old sci-fi movie—Killers from Space—overdubbing the soundtrack with humorous dialogue, and adding some new scenes, essentially turning it into an entirely different movie. The plot involves alien invaders with a machine that turns straight people gay.

== Plot ==
Scientist Doug Fartin (who insists that his name is pronounced “Far-tan”) is in charge of Operation Manhole, a project to eliminate all homosexuals in the military by luring them to a specific spot and then dropping a bomb on them. The bomb, however, misses its target and instead obliterates part of the nearby town of Inbred, Texas. The plane is then struck by an invisible force and crashes to earth, and its occupants—Dr. Fartin and the pilot—are presumed dead.

Fartin, however, was saved from the plane by extraterrestrials with bulging eyeballs, who then performed an operation on him. Fartin wanders back to the military base the next day, with no memory of how he survived the plane crash, and is beginning to exhibit stereotypically gay behavior (e.g., he keeps using the word “fabulous”).

Base commander Colonel Butz and surgeon Major Problemo talk to Doug's wife, Vagina, about her husband's new behavior; if she can't turn him back into “a real man,” he'll be included in the next bombing. She tries her best to sexually arouse him, but he can only have sex with her while imagining that she's Ted Kennedy.

The next day, Doug Fartin—whose security clearance has been revoked because of his new gayness—steals a piece of paper from a vault in Butz's office. Upon hearing of this, FBI agent Priggs tries to figure out what was stolen, which isn't easy because the vault is highly disorganized and mostly filled with take-out menus. Priggs discovers a handful of marijuana on the floor in front of the vault, and immediately recognizes it as part of Fartin's stash.

Doug arrives at Sodom Flats with the paper, but is caught and confronted by Priggs. Doug punches Priggs out and tries to escape in his car, but a hallucination of bulging eyeballs causes him to run off the road and crash. Regaining consciousness in the base infirmary, Fartin remembers what happened to him after the plane went down, and tells his story to Butz and the others:

The aliens, who are from Uranus (“an all-gay planet”), have been the ones responsible for creating homosexuals on Earth and other planets. Over the centuries, they've monitored these planets and tried to snuff out homophobia. The last time they’d visited Earth was during World War II, when their agents abducted Adolf Hitler and turned him into a cross-dressing lounge singer on another planet; the Germans set up an imposter in Hitler's place, but when the imposter ordered the invasion of Russia, the aliens knew that Nazi Germany was doomed, so they left.

Now the aliens have returned, with a new mission: to build a machine whose transmissions will cause everyone on Earth to become homosexual. They had ordered Fartin to return to the military base, steal from the vault the bottom half of page 32 from the original manuscript of Giovanni's Room, and bring it to the aliens’ subterranean headquarters at Sodom Flats. Fartin rightly concluded that there's something on the paper that the aliens needed to complete their machine and refused to cooperate, but the alien leader—the Super-Homo—hypnotized Doug to ensure his complicity.

After hearing Fartin's story, Butz and his associates aren't sure about Doug's sanity. Later, Sheriff Mussolino of Inbred (who's been turned into a bulging-eyed agent of the aliens) materializes in Fartin's room and tells him that the aliens now need a power source for their machine; Fartin, who is now convinced that helping the aliens is the right thing to do, goes to the nearby power station and orders the technician, at gunpoint, to move certain levers and switches (one of which causes the camera filming this movie to temporarily falter). Butz, Problemo, Priggs, Vagina, and others try to stop Doug, but they're too late; everyone looks out the window and witnesses a huge explosion, the radiation from which changes the sexuality of everyone on Earth, turning straight people gay and gay people—such as Doug Fartin—straight.

== Notes ==
- This film incorporates part of the independent short film Titler, in which a cross-dressing Adolf Hitler is singing about coming out of the closet. The entire 5-minute film can be seen on YouTube.
- Tagline: "They came from outer space... and they're fabulous!"
- This movie is currently available on DVD.

== See also ==
Other redubbed films:

- Fractured Flickers (TV series, 1963)
- What's Up, Tiger Lily? (1966)
- Night of the Day of the Dawn of the Son of the Bride of the Return of the Revenge of the Terror of the Attack of the Evil, Mutant, Alien, Flesh Eating, Hellbound, Zombified Living Dead Part 2: In Shocking 2-D (1991)
- Gayniggers from Outer Space (1992), a satiric film with the opposite premise.
- Kung Pow! Enter the Fist (2002)
- Kung Faux (TV series, 2003)
