= Guy Kingsford =

English-American actor

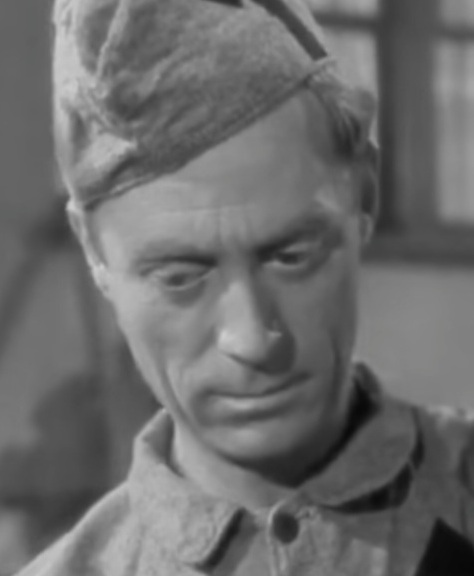
- Kingsford in Dressed to Kill (1946)
- Born: Guy Duncan Kingsford; September 30, 1911; Redhill, Surrey, England
- Died: November 9, 1986 (aged 75); Encino, California, U.S.
- Occupation: Actor
- Years active: 1935–1960
- Father: Walter Kingsford

Guy Duncan Kingsford (September 30, 1911 – November 9, 1986) was an English-born American film, television, and radio actor.

== Biography ==
Born in Redhill, Surrey in the United Kingdom, he was the son of British actor Walter Kingsford who moved with his wife to New York City.

In 1938 he was in the theatrical production Once is Enough.

He was in the US Army during World War II. He performed in a vaudeville-style variety show at Camp Sibert alongside other enlisted industry professionals. According to Sidney Skolsky, when Kingsford was traveling in Berlin, Germany that same year as part of a touring company, the Reich Film Chamber tried to recruit him to act in a propaganda film. In the role, he would have portrayed a "so-called "patriot" who would turn over United States military secrets to the German High Command." Kingsford was offered $3,000 up front and an additional $15,000 upon completion of the film. Kingsford sarcastically asked the recruiter from the Chamber if he had checked with the American Embassy prior to recruiting American actors for the film. The recruiter left and never contacted Kingsford again.

In the 1940s he was a voice actor in Lux Radio Theater shows. He also owned a home, with his sister, in Luxembourg along the Saar River. In 1943, he co-starred in Silk Hat Harry at the Music Box Theater in Los Angeles. That same year, while filming Sahara, he was almost injured by a bayonet but was protected by a package of war bonds in his shirt. He appears on a lobby card promoting the film Escort Girl.

In 1953, he played a Roman soldier in Salome.

He retired in 1960 and died in Encino, California, in 1986.

== Filmography ==
- The Headline Woman (1935), as a taxi driver
- Happy Go Lucky (1936)
- Escort Girl (1941)
- That Hamilton Woman (1941)
- Stagecoach Express (1942)
- Texas to Bataan (1942)
- Law of the Jungle (1942)
- House of Errors (1942)
- Sahara (1943)
- Paris After Dark (1943)
- The Phantom (1943)
- Second Chance (1943)
- The Lone Wolf in London (1947)
- Elephant Stampede (1951)
- Fort Vengeance (1953)
- Moonfleet (1955)
- The Night Holds Terror (1955)
- Teen-Age Crime Wave (1955)
- Inside Detroit (1956)
- The Decks Ran Red (1958)
- Highway Patrol (1955)
