= Having Wonderful Crime =

1945 film directed by A. Edward Sutherland

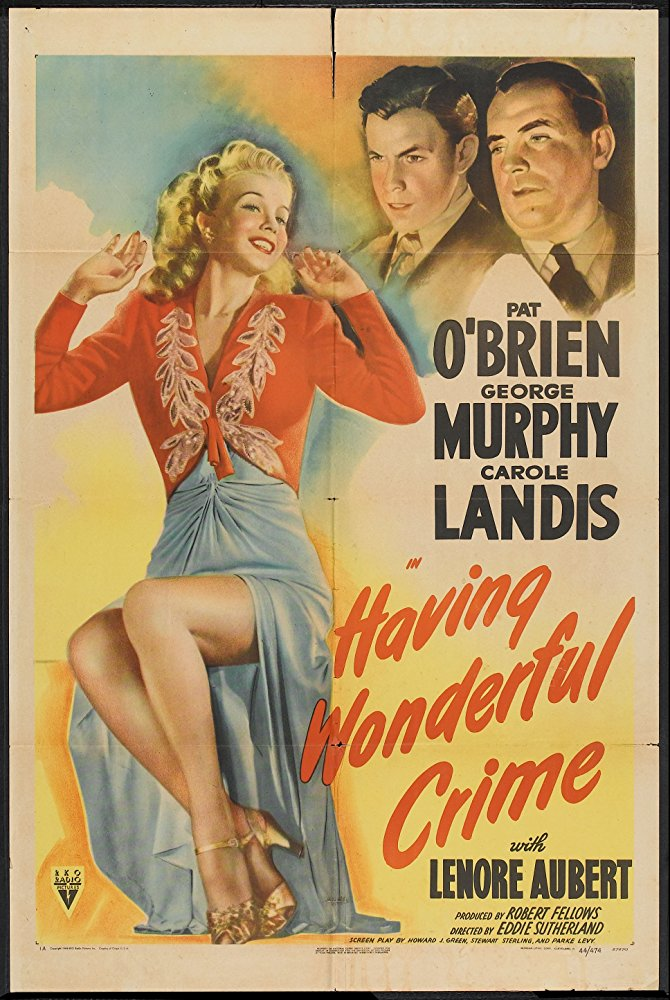
- Film poster
- Directed by: Eddie Sutherland; Clem Beauchamp (assistant)
- Screenplay by: Howard J. Green; Stewart Sterling; Parke Levy
- Based on: Having Wonderful Crime; 1943 novel by Craig Rice
- Produced by: Robert Fellows; Theron Warth (associate)
- Starring: Pat O'Brien; George Murphy; Carole Landis; Lenore Aubert
- Cinematography: Frank Redman
- Edited by: Gene Milford
- Music by: Leigh Harline
- Production company: RKO Radio Pictures
- Release date: April 12, 1945 (US)
- Running time: 70 minutes
- Country: United States
- Language: English

Having Wonderful Crime is a 1945 American screwball comedy and mystery film directed by Eddie Sutherland from a screenplay by Howard J. Green, Stewart Sterling, and Parke Levy, based on the novel of the same name by Craig Rice. In her series novels the main character was named John J. Malone, but for some reason the lawyer's name was changed for this film. Produced and distributed by RKO Radio Pictures, it opened in New York City on April 12, 1945. The film stars Pat O'Brien, George Murphy, and Carole Landis.

== Plot ==
Michael J. Malone, a lawyer and detective, keeps getting drawn into the mischief of his recently married friends, Jake and Helene Justus. The film opens as they run from the police and manage to hide in the theater of a magic show, where Movel, the magician, makes a disappearing act. After Movel fails to reappear, the audience panics and the police are called. However, Jake Justus, Helene Justus, and Michael J. Malone manage to escape the theater before the police arrive. As part of their escape, Malone insists on joining Jake and Helene for their honeymoon. While driving to the hotel, Helene was driving carelessly and accidentally ran another car off the road. Gilda, the driver of the other car, was one of Movel's assistants. Gilda's travels with a large trunk, which makes Malone suspicious of her but they decide to give Gilda a ride anyway. At the hotel, Gilda sees a mysterious man and faints. The trio take Gilda up to their room so she can get some rest and recover. While Gilda is sleeping Jake and Malone decide to look inside of Gilda's trunk. They find many of Movel's funny props, and after searching through the trunk for a few minutes, they discover a check for $50,000 made out to Movel from Elizabeth Lenhart. Malone and Jake then go to Elizabeth Lenhart's house to investigate while under the guise of window washers. At the same time, unbeknownst to Malone and Jake, Helene was speaking to Elizabeth Lenhart. After Helene informed Elizabeth Lenhart that she suspects that Movel has been murdered by his assistants, Elizabeth Lenhart writes a check for $50,000 to hire a lawyer to defend the assistants. However, the check later becomes blank because Elizabeth used invisible ink. Later that day Malone meets Winslow, the owner of the hotel, at the boathouse. Winslow confesses that he killed Movel in order to retrieve the $50,000 check. Winslow then holds Malone at gunpoint and forces him to step into a trunk. Then Winslow throws the trunk and Malone into the lake. After Jake and Helene come searching for Malone, Winslow attempts to kill them too by trapping them in a boat while the exhaust fills the cabin. However, Malone managed to escape from the trunk because it has a trick door at the bottom. So, Malone escapes and then frees Jake and Helene as well. The film then closes, as Malone walks into the hotel with the police to arrest Winslow.

== Cast ==
- Pat O'Brien as Michael J. Malone
- George Murphy as Jake Justus
- Carole Landis as Helene Justus
- Lenore Aubert as Gilda Mayfair
- George Zucco as King, aka The Great Movel
- Anje Berens as Phyllis Gray
- Richard Martin as Lance Richards
- Charles D. Brown as Mr. Winslow
- Wee Willie Davis as Zacharias, the Porter
- Blanche Ring as Elizabeth Lenhart
- Chili Williams as Blonde in Polka Dots
- Emory Parnell as Desk Sergeant
