= The Checkered Coat =

1948 film by Edward L. Cahn

- Theatrical release poster
- Directed by: Edward L. Cahn
- Screenplay by: John C. Higgins
- Story by: Merwin Gerard; Seeleg Lester
- Produced by: Sam Baerwitz
- Starring: Tom Conway; Noreen Nash; Hurd Hatfield; James Seay; Garry Owen; Marten Lamont
- Cinematography: Jackson Rose
- Edited by: Paul Landres
- Music by: Edward J. Kay
- Production company: 20th Century Fox
- Distributed by: 20th Century Fox
- Release date: July 16, 1948
- Running time: 66 minutes
- Country: United States
- Language: English

The Checkered Coat is a 1948 American drama film directed by Edward L. Cahn and written by John C. Higgins. The film stars Tom Conway, Noreen Nash, Hurd Hatfield, James Seay, Garry Owen and Marten Lamont. The film was released on July 16, 1948, by 20th Century-Fox.

== Cast ==
- Tom Conway as Dr. Michael Madden
- Noreen Nash as Betty Madden
- Hurd Hatfield as Steve 'Creepy' Bolin
- James Seay as Capt. Dunhill
- Garry Owen as Prince
- Marten Lamont as Fred Madden
- Frank Cady as Skinner
- Leonard Mudie as Jerry
- Russell Arms as Dr. Stevenson
- Lee Bonnell as Dr. Pryor
- Julian Rivero as Cafe Owner
- Dorothy Porter as Singer
- Sam Hayes as Announcer
- Dewey Robinson as Bartender
- Rory Mallinson as Perkins
- John Hamilton as Marcus Anson
- Fred Browne as Bill Anson
- Eddie Dunn as Brownlee
- Lee Tung Foo as Kim
