= Sue England =

American actress (1928–2018)

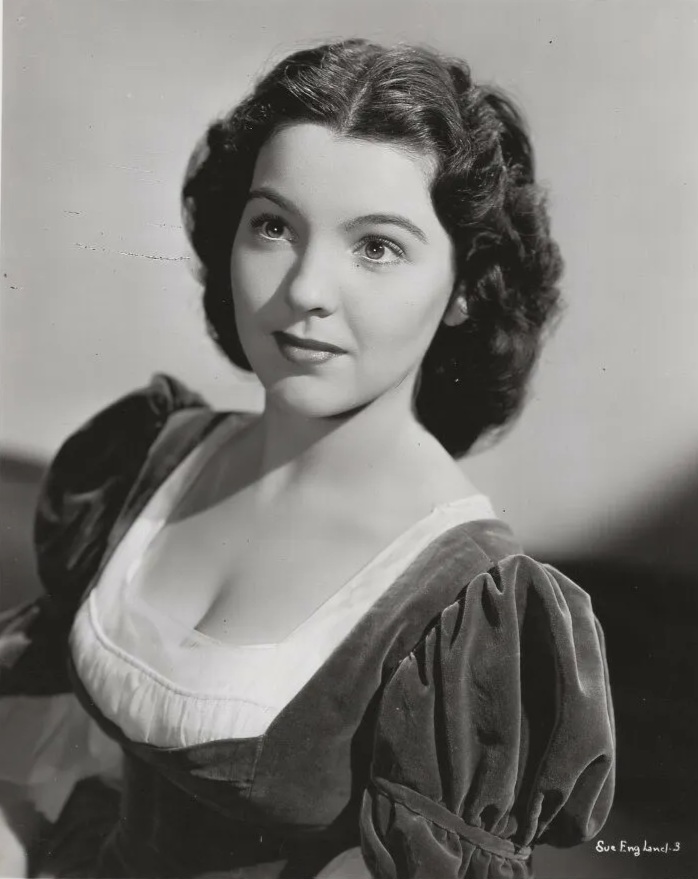
- Sue England in Kidnapped (1948)
- Born: July 17, 1928; Tulsa, Oklahoma, U.S.
- Died: March 19, 2018 (aged 89); Los Angeles, California, U.S.
- Occupations: Film and television actress
- Years active: 1945–1974
- Spouse: Larry Stewart (1955-1997) (his death) (2 children)
- Children: 2

Sue England (July 17, 1928 – March 19, 2018) was an American actress.

== Early years ==
England won beauty titles as a youngster -- "Miss Tulsa" when she was 6 years old and "Oklahoma's Sweetheart" when she was older.

== Career ==
England's professional acting career began in 1945, when she played Merle Oberon's daughter Susette Touzac in This Love of Ours. Her work in the film was described by a newspaper columnist as "one of the season's best fledgling performances".

Other notable films she appeared in include Kidnapped, The Devil on Wheels and City Across the River.

England later turned to television work and acted in shows such as Lost in Space, The Cisco Kid, Father Knows Best and as a Native American pregnant woman on Daniel Boone. Sue England made five appearances on Perry Mason and also appeared in an episode of the TV series The Lone Ranger, season 1, Eye for an Eye (episode 42). Her acting career ended in 1974.

== Death ==
England died on March 19, 2018, at the age of 89.

== Selected filmography ==
Year	Title	Role	Notes
1947	The Devil on Wheels	Peggy Andrews	
1948	Kidnapped	Aileen Fairlie	
1949	City Across the River	Betty Maylor	
1950	The Underworld Story	Helen	
1955	Teen-Age Crime Wave	Jane Koberly	
1956	The Women of Pitcairn Island	Nana'i Young	
1957	Funny Face	Laura	
1967	Clambake	Cigarette Girl	
