= Killers from Space =

1954 film directed by W. Lee Wilder

- Theatrical release poster
- Directed by: W. Lee Wilder
- Written by: William Raynor; Myles Wilder
- Produced by: W. Lee Wilder
- Starring: Peter Graves; Barbara Bestar; James Seay; Frank Gerstle
- Narrated by: Mark Scott
- Cinematography: William H. Clothier
- Edited by: William Faris
- Music by: Manuel Compinsky
- Production companies: Planet Filmplays, Inc.; RKO Radio Pictures
- Distributed by: RKO Radio Pictures
- Release date: January 23, 1954
- Running time: 71 minutes
- Country: United States
- Language: English

Killers from Space (also known as The Man Who Saved the Earth) is a 1954 American independent science fiction film produced and directed by W. Lee Wilder, and starring Peter Graves, Barbara Bestar, Frank Gerstle, James Seay, and Steve Pendleton. Shot in black-and-white, the film originated as a commissioned screenplay from Wilder's son Myles Wilder and their regular collaborator William Raynor.

Lee Wilder's production company, Planet Filmplays, usually producing on a financing-for-distribution basis for United Artists, made this film for RKO Radio Pictures distribution.

== Plot ==
Dr. Douglas Martin is a nuclear scientist working on atomic bomb tests. While collecting aerial data on a United States Air Force (USAF) atomic blast at Soledad Flats, the pilot loses control of their aircraft and they crash. Dr Martin appears to have survived, unhurt, walking back to the air base with no memory of what happened. On his chest is a strange scar that was not there before the crash.

At the base hospital, Martin acts so strangely that the USAF brings in the FBI to investigate, thinking he might be an impostor. He is eventually cleared but told to take some time off. Martin protests being excluded from his project while on leave.

When an atomic test is set off without his knowledge, Martin steals the data, then goes back to Soledad Flats and tries to place the information under a boulder, but is interrupted by FBI Agent Briggs. Martin knocks out Briggs and tries to escape by car, but, pursued, he crashes .

Now back at the hospital, he is given truth serum. Deep under the drug's influence, Martin tells a story about being held captive by space aliens, led by Denab, in their underground base. The aliens, with large, bulging eyes, are from the planet Astron Delta, ruled by a being called The Tala. They had revived his lifeless body as he had died in his aircraft. The aliens plan to exterminate humanity using giant insects and reptiles, grown with the radiation absorbed from our own atomic bomb tests. Martin deduces that the aliens use stolen electric grid power to control their powerful equipment, and that the A-bomb's released energy levels can be predicted and then balanced. The aliens wiped his memory and hypnotized him into collecting the data for them.

The FBI agent, Martin's collaborating scientist Dr. Kruger, and the base commander are skeptical of this incredible story and keep him confined at the hospital. Nevertheless, the attending physician says that Martin genuinely believes that what he told them is true.

With calculations made using a slide rule, Martin determines that if he shuts off the power to Soledad Flats for just 10 seconds, it will create an overload in the aliens' equipment. He escapes from the hospital and goes to the nearby electrical power plant, where he forces the power control room supervisor to turn off the power. After 10 seconds, the alien base is destroyed in a massive explosion, saving the Earth from conquest and proving Martin right, sane and a hero.

== Cast ==
- Peter Graves as Dr. Douglas Martin
- Barbara Bestar as Ellen Martin
- Frank Gerstle (as Frank Gerstel) as Dr. Curt Kruger
- James Seay as Col. Banks
- Steve Pendleton as FBI Agent Briggs
- Shepard Menken (as Shep Menken) as Major Clift, M.D.
- John Frederick (as John Merrick) as Deneb and The Tala
- Jack Daly as powerhouse supervisor
- Burt Wenland as Sgt. Bandero
- Ruth Bennett as Miss Vincent
- Ron Gans (as Ron Kennedy) as Sentry Sergeant Powers
- Lester Dorr as gas station attendant
- Mark Scott as narrator
- Ben Welden as Tar Baby 2 pilot
- Roy Engel as 1st police dispatcher (uncredited)
- Coleman Francis as power plant phone operator (uncredited)
- Robert Roark as unspecified guard

== Production ==
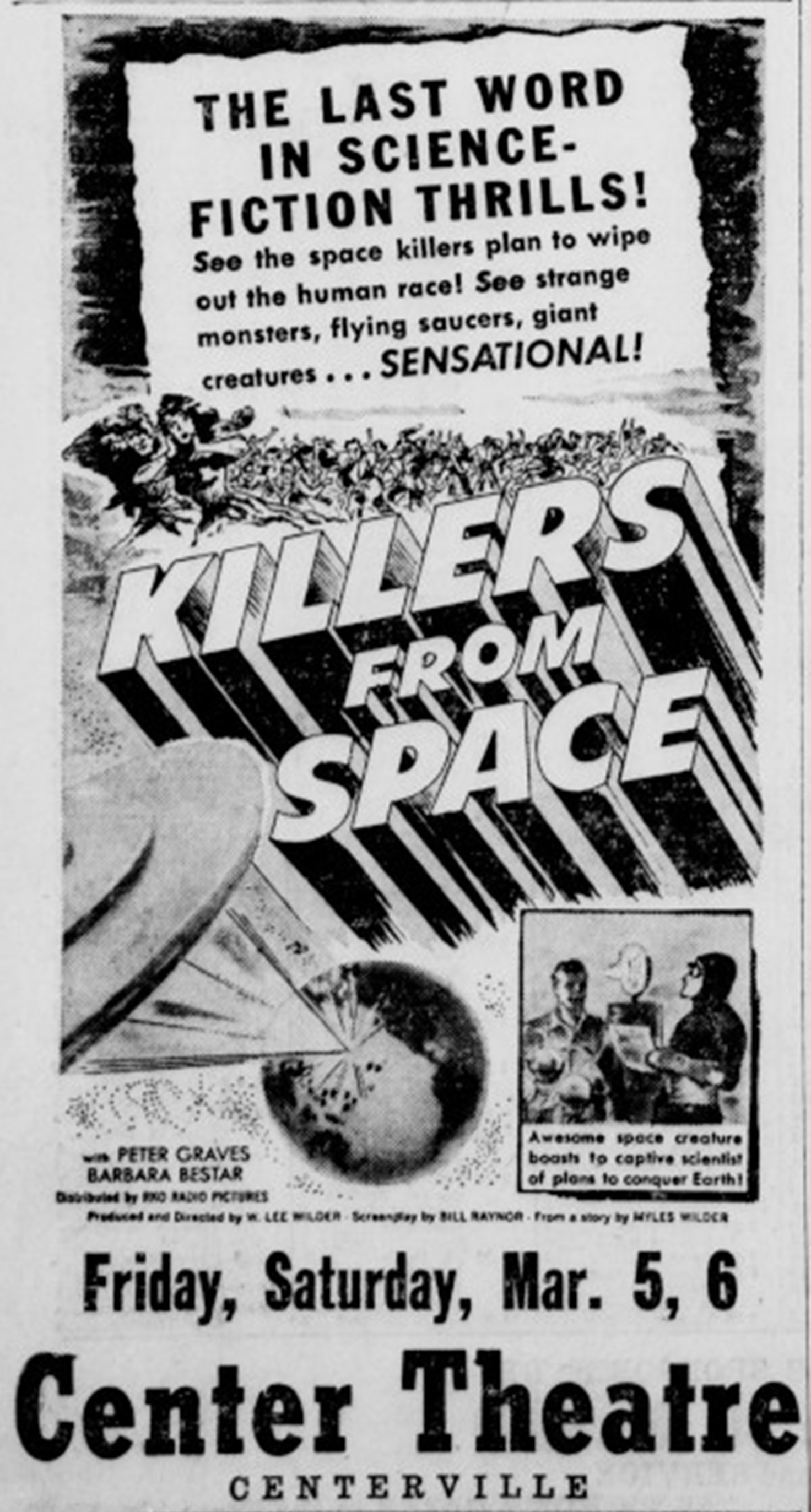
Advertisement from 1954

Under the working title of The Man Who Saved the Earth, production took place from early- to mid-July 1953 at KTTV Studios. Scenes featuring the cavern hideout of the aliens were shot in Bronson Canyon in Los Angeles.

The effect for the aliens in the film was done by Harry Thomas. He was told to make large eyes for them, albeit on a cheap budget, since glass eyes would have cost too much. Needing an idea, he found it while looking in his refrigerator: plastic egg trays, of which he used the top portion by cutting it with a heated screwdriver. He then cut little holes with the screwdriver. Owing to a lack of further time meant that he did not do further work that he would have liked to do, such as sealing the sides with cotton.

== Contemporary reception ==
The Monthly Film Bulletin wrote: "This effort at science fiction appears credible until the flashbacks, after which it degenerates into a series of comic strip-style adventures. The 'killer reptiles' appear to be little more than enlargements of harmless denizens of the garden, whilst the goggle-eyed Astronians are reminiscent of very human frog-men."

Kine Weekly wrote: "Pseudo-scientific hokum, staged on serial-like lines. ... The climax is suspenseful, but the preliminaries are too highly coloured to thrill other than industrial fans and juveniles."

Variety wrote: "For the exploitation market this science-fiction entry indicates fair returns, but is a routine affair where more adroit handling might have upped it to a true chiller. ... Acting demands are few and Wilder makes no particular effort for characterizations in his direction. Graves is acceptable as the scientist who knows the world is in grave danger, but other thesps are lost in stock roles."

Boxoffice wrote: "No success whatsoever met this obvious attempt to parlay some stock footage, a collection of pseudo-scientific props and touches of trick photography into a suspenseful space-opera that might capitalize on the current popularity of pictures of its category. There isn't a thrill or goose-pimple in the offering's entire footage."

== Legacy ==
In 2006, film reviewer Thomas Scalzo also noted: "Killers From Space is an enjoyable, if slow-going, sci-fi / horror diversion, and if these killers from space had somehow found a way to stop their yammering long enough to get on with some actual killing, the combination of Peter Graves, mutant insects and amphibians, a palpable atmosphere of ’50s atomic fear, and the directorial efforts of Billy Wilder’s brother, would have been enough to bump the film into the upper echelon of early sci-fi essentials".

In 2006 skeptic Dr. Aaron Sakulich noted similarities between the film and many alien abduction stories that would first appear over a decade later, such as the medical testing done by the aliens, the protagonist's strange scar, his memory erasure, the aliens' giant eyes, and their way of mind control.

In 2007, The Film Crew, consisting of Bill Corbett, Kevin Murphy and Michael J. Nelson from the cult TV series Mystery Science Theater 3000, mocked the film in its entirety. They revisited the film in 2019 with new commentary under the Rifftrax banner.

== See also ==
- Don't Ask Don't Tell, a comically redubbed version of this film.
- 1954 in film
