= Assigned to Danger =

1948 film by Budd Boetticher

- Theatrical release lobby card
- Directed by: Budd Boetticher
- Screenplay by: Eugene Ling
- Story by: Robert E. Kent
- Produced by: Eugene Ling
- Starring: Gene Raymond; Noreen Nash; Robert Bice
- Cinematography: L. William O'Connell
- Edited by: W. Donn Hayes
- Music by: Albert Glasser
- Production company: Ben Stoloff Productions
- Distributed by: Eagle-Lion Films
- Release date: May 19, 1948 (United States)
- Running time: 66 minutes
- Country: United States
- Language: English

Assigned to Danger is a 1948 American crime film noir directed by Budd Boetticher and starring Gene Raymond, Noreen Nash and Robert Bice. The film's sets designed by the art director Edward L. Ilou. It was distributed by Eagle-Lion Films.

== Plot ==
Frankie Mantell's gang pulls an $80,000 payroll stickup in Los Angeles. But getaway driver Nip Powers is killed and Frankie shot and wounded.

Insurance investigator Dan Sullivan is assigned the case by the company that's been robbed. Following a lead, Dan goes to a mountain lodge. It is run by Bonnie Powers, the dead getaway driver's sister, with the help of Joey, a deaf mute. Dan doesn't disclose his identity, and Bonnie mistakenly believes him to be a doctor.

Frankie and his gang members, Louie, Matty and Biggie, come to the lodge. They are suspicious of Dan, but Bonnie vouches for him. Since he's said to be a doctor, Frankie demands that Dan remove the bullet from his arm. He sends Louie into town to get the necessary instruments.

Dan learns that Bonnie is married to Frankie, but hates him now, not knowing of his criminal nature when they wed. Frankie tells his men to kill Dan if the operation doesn't succeed. Louie panics and tries to leave, so Frankie kills him. Now fearing for Bonnie's life, her deaf employee Joey slips into Frankie's room and suffocates him to death.

The other gunmen shoot Joey and try to prevent Dan and Bonnie from getting away. Dan gets his hands on a gun and manages to overcome them. Bonnie is placed under arrest and charged with harboring a fugitive, but Dan promises to be waiting when she gets out of jail.

== Cast ==
- Gene Raymond as Dan Sullivan
- Noreen Nash as Bonnie Powers
- Robert Bice as Frankie Mantell
- Martin Kosleck as Louie Volkes
- Mary Meade as Evie
- Ralf Harolde as Matty Farmer
- Jack Overman as Biggie Kritz
- Gene Evans as Joey
- Emory Parnell as Sheriff

== Production ==
Boetticher had a three-picture deal with Eagle Lion Films.

== Reception ==
Film critic Hal Erickson has praised the film, writing, "An early effort from director Oscar 'Budd' Boetticher, Assigned to Danger was a worthwhile showcase for Gene Raymond, who'd been absent from the screen for several years..Director Boetticher is at his best in the closing reels, slowly and methodically building tension upon tension as Sullivan seeks an avenue of escape."
