= T-Men =

1947 film by Anthony Mann

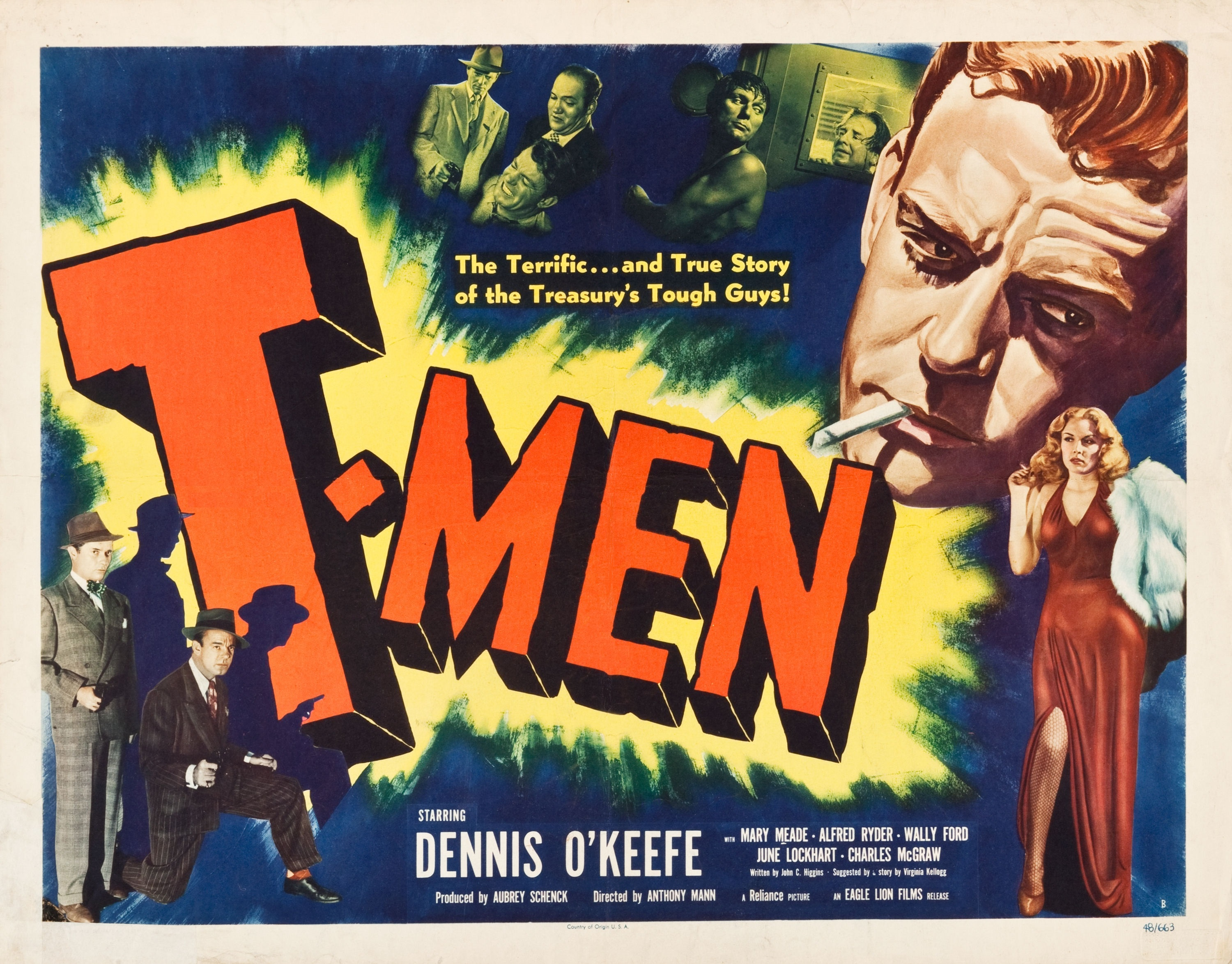
- Theatrical release poster
- Directed by: Anthony Mann
- Screenplay by: John C. Higgins
- Story by: Virginia Kellogg
- Produced by: Aubrey Schenck
- Starring: Dennis O'Keefe; Mary Meade; Alfred Ryder
- Narrated by: Reed Hadley
- Cinematography: John Alton
- Edited by: Fred Allen
- Music by: Paul Sawtell
- Color process: Black and white
- Production companies: Edward Small Productions; Bryan Foy Productions
- Distributed by: Eagle-Lion Films
- Release dates: December 15, 1947 (United States); December 25, 1947 (Los Angeles); January 22, 1948 (New York City)
- Running time: 92 minutes
- Country: United States
- Language: English
- Budget: $424,000 or $450,000
- Box office: $1.6 million (US/Canada) $2.5 million (worldwide)

T-Men is a 1947 semidocumentary and police procedural style film noir about United States Treasury agents. The film was directed by Anthony Mann and shot by noted noir cameraman John Alton. The production features Dennis O'Keefe, Mary Meade, Alfred Ryder, Wallace Ford, June Lockhart and Charles McGraw. A year later, director Mann used the film's male lead, Dennis O'Keefe, in Raw Deal.

The film was endorsed by the U.S. Treasury Department: the opening credits are displayed over an image of the department's seal, then former Chief Coordinator of the department's six agencies Elmer Lincoln Irey delivers a monologue describing the objectives of those agencies and lauding their accomplishments. He describes the movie as a composite case from the files entitled "The Shanghai Paper Case".

== Plot ==
In order to convict a counterfeiting ring, two United States Treasury agents are chosen to go undercover and infiltrate the Vantucci gang in Detroit. Dennis O'Brien and Anthony Genero are the agents, and they are to start at the bottom and work their way up the gang's hierarchy. To infiltrate the gang they must appear to be criminals from the Detroit milieu, so they study the history of Detroit crime in order to create reliable false identities. They declare themselves to be the last two members of the moribund River Gang, and that they are "on the lam" (on the run). They become Vannie Harrigan (O'Brien) and Tony Galvani (Genaro), and convince Pasquale, the proprietor of a notorious hotel that they are real criminals.

Pasquale sends them to Vantucci, who uses counterfeit revenue stamps for his hijacked liquor. He surreptitiously quizzes them about local crime history, offering up incorrect facts which the agents are able to correct, and they are "hired." They hear the name of a gangster, "Schemer", and learn that he is the gang's West Coast liaison. They secretly obtain a pair of his overalls and send them to the bureau's crime lab for analysis, where his size, weight, the fact he smokes cigars, and the fact he chews Chinese health herbs are ascertained. Armed with this information, O'Brien heads for Los Angeles.

O'Brien searches Chinatown following the herb lead, where he discovers that Schemer frequents steam baths. He finds a man fitting Schemer's description who goes to a hotel where a backroom craps game is being played. O'Brien bluffs his way in, then introduces a counterfeit bill into play. The phony bill is discovered and O'Brien is blamed; they beat him and throw him into the alley. O'Brien shows Schemer his fake bill (which he has recovered). His bill is well-printed since hand-engraved plates were used, but it has inferior paper. The gang's counterfeit bills are the opposite: lesser quality printing due to mere photoengraving, but on superior stock. Schemer offers to approach a higher-up about a collaboration.

Gangsters await O'Brien in his apartment and rough him up, wanting to know his "game". They suspect he is a Treasury agent, so he tells them to check with Detroit. O'Brien is eventually taken to an exclusive home in Beverly Hills, where he meets a Mr. Triano. O'Brien proposes a merger, but Triano says he is all set, so O'Brien threatens to start his own operation.

O'Brien returns to Detroit and is given a sample of the gang's paper so he can print a bill on it using his plates. The result is acceptable, so O'Brien turns over the back plate, but says they'll get the front one when he meets the boss.

Tony's wife is out shopping with a friend who identifies Tony on the street. She attempts to engage him while Tony claims he isn't married and doesn't know them. Tony's wife recognizes to deny who Tony really is due to his cover, but Schemer, who is with him, is suspicious.

Moxie locks Schemer into a steam room and turns up the heat, cooking him alive. Tony is overheard on a call asking about his wife. His cover blown, he is murdered in front of O'Brien. It is revealed that the gang's technician, Paul Miller, had worked with August Bauman, the engraver of the plates the bureau is using, so Miller would be able to identify the true engraver. O'Brien discovers a claim check in Schemer's room. It produces Schemer's coded documentation of all the gang's illegal activities, which he had kept as insurance.

O'Brien is taken to the gang's base of operation, a docked ship, in order to meet the Chief. Miller is summoned in order to verify the provenance of the plates, but actually covers for O'Brien; Miller did recognize the plates, but he had realized that O'Brien was an agent early on, and spares him because he wants to become a government witness. Miller is shot; O'Brien is wounded but survives. The police arrive, raids are conducted, and the Chief is apprehended.

== Cast ==
- Dennis O'Keefe as Dennis O'Brien, a.k.a. Vannie Harrigan
- Mary Meade as Evangeline
- Alfred Ryder as Tony Genaro – aka Tony Galvani
- Wallace Ford as The Schemer (as Wally Ford)
- June Lockhart as Mary Genaro
- Charles McGraw as Moxie
- Jane Randolph as Diana Simpson
- Anton Kosta as Vantucci
- Art Smith as Gregg
- Herbert Heyes as Chief Carson
- Jack Overman as Brownie
- John Wengraf as 'Shiv' Triano
- Jim Bannon as Agent Lindsay
- William Malten as Paul Miller

Playing the role of Dennis O'Brien proved to be a breakthrough for Dennis O'Keefe. Before T-Men, he was known mainly as a light comedic actor. The decision to cast him against type as a tough cop was not entirely an objective one; producer Small was also O'Keefe's agent, and they hoped to bolster his career. The plan succeeded, and after the success of T-Men, they immediately paired again for 1948's Raw Deal. O'Keefe would go on to play in many films noir, as well as other genres.

== Production ==
The film was the first of a series of film noirs from Eagle Lion. Edward Small provided the finance and Eagle Lion took 25% of the profits.

Anthony Mann called the film "the first big one" in his career. "I worked on the script from scratch, and it was the first film on which I was able to do this. The others were given to me... T Men was originally only an idea, and I was able to work with William Eirie from the Treasury Department. He brought all the files, so that we could devise and create a story with John Higgins that at least had some potency and value. This is what I really call my first film. I was responsible for its story, for its structure, its characters and for actually making it. This was my first real break towards being able to make films the way I wanted."

T-Men was partially financed by organized crime. John Roselli, Hollywood labor racketeer for the Chicago mob and a movie aficionado, formed a silent partnership with Joseph Breen, head of the Production Code Office, to invest in the movie. (Roselli had met Breen when he had worked in the Office ten years earlier.)

Although the film was a success it led to a breach between Small and Eagle Lion, as Small was unhappy with the way his contribution to the film was minimized in its advertising.

Locations feature the old Los Angeles Plaza area. The undercover cop, seeking his contact, leaves Union Station, crosses Alameda and walks up notorious Ferguson Alley (once full of brothels and opium dens in L.A.'s "old Chinatown") and by the Lugo Adobe (all torn down for "The Slot", L.A.'s first downtown freeway). Next, he goes into a Chinese apothecary (once L.A.'s first fire station and now restored as part of the Plaza).

It is the first of five creatively successful collaborations between director Mann and acclaimed cinematographer John Alton, and features "some of the most distinctive stylistics of the film noir movement." Because Mann and Alton "trusted each other, the film has intense, almost unbearable mood and texture".

== Reception ==
The film was successful at the box office. It earned $3,000,000 on a $425,000 budget, a significant profit for a B movie in 1947.

=== Critical response ===
The New York Times film critic, Bosley Crowther, gave the film a positive review, "Hand it to Mr. Small's craftsmen: they have turned out a cops-and-robbers film in this new 'semi-documentary' format which, for action, is one of the best ... Made in part on locations in Detroit and Los Angeles, it does have a look of reality not often encountered in such films ... And Anthony Mann has directed the action, of which there is more than enough, with a fine sense of melodramatic timing and a good eye for sharp, severe effects."

In 2005, film critic Dennis Schwartz praised the film, writing, "The compelling well-made fake realism of the small studio sleeper semi-documentary crime thriller, T-Men, brought to wider attention the immense skills of B-film director Anthony Mann (Desperate/The Tin Star/The Man from Laramie) and cinematographer John Alton ... John Alton's brilliant camerawork makes the mise en scène dramatically grander than the matter-of-fact tone of the narration."

=== Accolades ===
The film was nominated for the Academy Award for Best Sound (Jack Whitney).

== Adaptation and remake ==
A radio adaptation on Lux Radio Theatre was broadcast February 23, 1948. It too starred Dennis O'Keefe.

The film was remade in 1969 as The File of the Golden Goose, directed by Sam Wanamaker and starring Yul Brynner and Edward Woodward, this time set in London, England, instead of the United States.

In 1970, Small announced he intended to turn the film into a TV series, but it did not materialize.
