= Teen-Age Crime Wave =

1955 film by Fred F. Sears

- Theatrical release poster
- Directed by: Fred F. Sears
- Screenplay by: Ray Buffum; Harry Essex
- Story by: Ray Buffum
- Produced by: Sam Katzman
- Starring: Tommy Cook; Molly McCart
- Cinematography: Henry Freulich
- Edited by: Jerome Thoms
- Color process: Black and white
- Production company: Clover Productions
- Distributed by: Columbia Pictures
- Release date: November 1955
- Running time: 76 minutes
- Country: United States
- Language: English

Teen-Age Crime Wave (a.k.a. Teenage Crime Wave) is a 1955 American juvenile delinquency film noir crime film directed by Fred F. Sears, and starring Tommy Cook and Molly McCart. It was released by Columbia Pictures. The plot follows a pair of delinquent teens who go on a statewide shooting spree after escaping from reform school.

It was featured in a 1994 episode of Mystery Science Theater 3000.

== Plot ==
Jane Koberly, accidentally present during a robbery, is falsely convicted of being an accessory. While being transferred to an industrial school with her cellmate Terry Marsh, Terry's boyfriend Mike Denton springs them, killing a deputy in the process. With the police hot on their trail, they take over a farmhouse owned by the Grants and terrorize the family while waiting for their friend Al to arrive with money and transport. The Grants' son Ben arrives for Thanksgiving, and is also held hostage. As time passes, Mike becomes more unhinged as Terry flirts with Ben. The criminals are forced to flee after killing a neighbor of the Grants. The fugitives are cornered at the Griffith Observatory, where Terry is fatally shot by the police, and Mike is subdued by Ben. Before she dies, Terry confesses to the police that Jane is innocent. When Mike is taken to Terry's dead body, he breaks down and cries hysterically.

== Cast ==
- Tommy Cook as Mike Denton
- Molly McCart as Terry Marsh (credited as Mollie McCart)
- Sue England as Jane Koberly
- Frank Griffin as Benjamin David "Ben" Grant
- James Bell as Thomas Paul Grant
- Kay Riehl as Sarah Wayne Grant
- Guy Kingsford as Mr. Koberly
- Larry Blake as State Police Sgt. Connors

== Mystery Science Theater 3000 ==
Teen-Age Crime Wave was shown as episode #522 of Mystery Science Theater 3000. The episode debuted January 15, 1994. Among fans, the episode has a middling reputation. It did not make the Top 100 list of episodes as voted upon by MST3K Season 11 Kickstarter backers. Writer Jim Vorel ranked the episode #82 (out of 191 total MST3K episodes), judging it a solid episode; he claims, "The film is quite solid, a melodramatic 'teens in trouble' flick ... and it receives a thorough riffing. But every one of the sketches is memorable, and indicative of the wilder, more high-energy tone that came into the show after Mike became the host."

The MST3K version of Teen-Age Crime Wave was included as part of the Mystery Science Theater 3000 Volume XXXIII DVD collection, released by Shout! Factory in July 2015. The other episodes in the four-disc set include Daddy-O (episode #307), Earth vs. the Spider (episode #313), and Agent for H.A.R.M. (episode #815).
