= Lee Siegel (professor and novelist) =

American academic (born 1945)

- Born: July 22, 1945 (age 81); Los Angeles, California, US
- Occupations: Professor, novelist
- Children: 2 sons
- Parent: Noreen Nash (mother)
- Writing career
- Genres: Fiction, campus novel

Lee Albert Siegel (born July 22, 1945) is a novelist, left-wing activist, and professor emeritus of religion at the University of Hawaii at Manoa. His 1999 novel, Love in a Dead Language, was a New York Times Notable Book of the Year and a bestseller in India.

== Life and career ==
Siegel studied comparative literature at the University of California, Berkeley and fine arts at Columbia University. He received his DPhil from the University of Oxford for a dissertation in the field of Sanskrit. He then was hired by the University of Hawaii as Professor of Religious Studies, where he has taught ever since.

In 1988, Siegel was a John Simon Guggenheim Memorial Foundation Fellow. He has received numerous fellowships and grants including five Senior Research Fellowships from the American Institute of Indian Studies and the Smithsonian Institution (1979, 1983, 1987, 1991, 1996), four research grants from the American Council of Learned Societies and the Social Science Research Council (1982, 1985, 1987, 1990), as well as one from the Center for Asian and Pacific Studies. In addition, Professor Siegel has been awarded two Presidential Awards for Excellence in Teaching (1986 and 1996). He has been a scholar-in-residence at the Rockefeller Foundation, including two periods at its Bellagio Study Center (1990 and 2003). He also was a visiting fellow at All Souls College of Oxford University (1997). In 2003, Siegel was featured in the television documentary series Penn & Teller's Magic and Mystery Tour. Siegel has been an invited speaker at numerous literary and scholarly events as well. He was recently featured as a panelist at the 2018 Hawaii Book & Music Fair and the 2019 Asia Society Gala.

Siegel has been called "one of the most difficult writers to locate on a map of contemporary American fiction." Of Love in a Dead Language, a New York Times reviewer wrote that "while the novel's historical texts, both actual and imagined, give pleasure, they also tell an incisive history of Orientalism, Europeans' construction of Indian sexuality, the elision of exotic and erotic."

He has two sons.

== Primarily nonfiction ==
From 1978 until the late 1990s, Siegel published scholarly studies of Indian love poetry, comedy, horror, and magic. Many contain fictional elements.

- Jayadeva; Siegel, Lee (trans) (2009). Gītagovinda: Love songs of Rādhā and Kṛṣṇa. The Clay Sanskrit Library, New York University Press and JJC Foundation. ISBN 978-0-8147-4078-1.
- Sacred and Profane Dimensions of Love in Indian Traditions as Exemplified in the Gitagovinda of Jayadeva (Oxford University South Asian Studies Series)(1978)
- Dream-symbolism in the sramanic tradition: two psychoanalytical studies in Jinist and Buddhist dream legends (with Jagdish P. Sharma) (1980)
- Fires of Love, Waters of Peace in Indian Culture (1983)
- Laughing Matters. Comic Tradition in India (Chicago: The University of Chicago Press, 1987) ISBN 978-0-226-75691-2
- Net of Magic. Wonders and Deceptions in India (Chicago: The University of Chicago Press, 1991) ISBN 978-0-226-75687-5
- City of Dreadful Night. A Story about Horror and the Macabre in India (Chicago: The University of Chicago Press, 1995) ISBN 978-0-226-75689-9

== Novels and other works of fiction ==
- Love in a Dead Language: A Romance (Chicago: The University of Chicago Press, 1999) ISBN 978-0-226-75699-8. Read an excerpt and a NY Times review. It was named the New York Times Notable Book of the Year.
- Love and Other Games of Chance: A Novelty (2003)
- Who Wrote the Book of Love? A Chronicle of the Sexual Life of an American Boy in the 1950s (Chicago: The University of Chicago Press, 2005) ISBN 978-0-226-75700-1. Read an excerpt.
- Love and the Incredibly Old Man: A Novel (Chicago: The University of Chicago Press, 2008) ISBN 978-0-226-75705-6. Read an excerpt.
- Trance-Migrations: Stories of India, Tales of Hypnosis (Chicago: The University of Chicago Press, 2014) ISBN 9780226185323. Read an excerpt.
- Typerotica (Deuxmers, 2020) ISBN 978-1-944521-09-7.
- Horseplay (Deuxmers, 2020) ISBN 978-1-944521-10-3
