= Emil Cadkin =

American composer (1920–2020)

- Born: Emil Milton Cadkin; August 26, 1920; Cleveland, Ohio, U.S.
- Died: December 16, 2020 (aged 100)
- Genres: Film scores
- Occupations: Composer; conductor; music director
- Instrument: Piano
- Years active: 1942–2002

Emil Milton Cadkin (August 26, 1920 – December 16, 2020) was an American TV and film composer who worked mainly as a production music composer. He worked with William Loose (1910–1991) and Harry Bluestone (1907–1992). Some of his music was also featured on APM Music. Cadkin composed music for 1940s, 1950s and 1960s TV series, films and cartoons including Gumby and Hanna-Barbera's Augie Doggie.

== Early life ==
He was born in August 1920 in Cleveland, Ohio, the youngest of three children to Isadore and Sarah Cadkin, who had emigrated from the Russian Empire in 1905. His father was a cabinet maker in Los Angeles by 1936. Cadkin attended Yale University, where he majored in music, with special emphasis in Music Composition and Music Theory. He was in Los Angeles writing and teaching music by the time he enlisted in the Air Force in 1942. His song I Have Everything I Want But You was copyrighted in 1938.

== Career ==
After being discharged from the Air Force, he scored films like "The Big Fix" for bottom-of-the-barrel studio PRC. Cadkin was an associate editor of ASCAP's ‘The Score’ when it was created in 1948, and got a job in 1958 as musical director at Ritco Productions, a low-budget company that churned out westerns starring Forrest Tucker. Cadkin switched from ASCAP to BMI the following year. He graduated to become musical director and arranger for Columbia Pictures and Screen Gems. He also got into the business of supplying taped music programming for radio stations, as Billboard of May 23, 1970 reveals he had been appointed music director of popular products (as opposed to classical) for American Tape Duplicators. But he spent a decade writing his own music and co-writing music along with Bill Loose, which ended up in various libraries, including Capitol Hi-Q. Billboard of December 23, 1967 reveals distribution rights to that music, previously in the PMS, OK and PM libraries, which had belonged to Capitol, had been purchased by Emil Ascher, Inc.

== Career Achievement ==
Emil Cadkin is widely credited with the idea for, and the creation of, the United States' first production music libraries (PMS, OK & PM) in the early 1950s.

== Lawsuit ==
From about 1959 until the 1970s, plaintiff Emil Cadkin wrote thousands of musical cues, solely and with William Loose. Licensing of the cues was administered by GRH Music, a partnership formed by Cadkin and Loose.

Plaintiff, represented by attorney Marty O'Toole, alleged that defendants, Loose's heirs, removed plaintiff's name as an author of the works, incorporated the cues including the ones written solely by Cadkin in their own music library, and registered the works with the Copyright Office with defendant's name as sole author, thus depriving plaintiff of receiving royalties from the licensing of the works.

Defendants moved to dismiss the second amended complaint, and plaintiffs moved for voluntary dismissal without prejudice, which the district court granted. Defendants subsequently moved for attorney's fees under Section 505 of the Copyright Act which provides "In any civil action under this title, the court in its discretion may allow the recovery of full costs by or against any party [and] . . . the court may also award a reasonable attorney's fee to the prevailing party as part of the costs."

The district court awarded attorney's fees and costs to defendants, and the Ninth Circuit reversed. Ninth Circuit precedent (Corcoran v. Columbia Broadcasting System, Inc., 121 F.2d 575 (9th Cir. 1941)) held that a defendant could recover attorney's fees under Section 505 when a plaintiff voluntarily dismissed the action without prejudice. However, the court stated that the 1941 decision was no longer good law in light of the 2001 U.S. Supreme Court decision Buckhannon Bd. & Care Home, Inc. v. W. Va. Dep't of Health & Human Res., 532 U.S. 598 (2001) which held in the context of the Fair Housing Amendments Act that prevailing party status turns on whether there has been a "material alteration of the legal relationship of the parties."

In Corcoran, the district court denied defendants' motion to dismiss but granted their motion for a more definite statement on a copyright claim. Rather than amending the complaint, plaintiff voluntarily dismissed without prejudice, and the district court ultimately awarded defendants attorney's fees. The Ninth Circuit rejected plaintiff's contention that dismissal without prejudice does not confer prevailing party status under the Copyright Act, stating "Where, as here, a defendant has been put to the expense of making an appearance and of obtaining an order for the clarification of the complaint, and the plaintiff then voluntarily dismisses without amending his pleading, the party sued is the prevailing party within the spirit and intent of the statute even though he may, at the whim of the plaintiff, again be sued on the same cause of action."

In the case at hand, the court determined that Corcoran cannot be reconciled with Buckhannon's material alteration test because Corcoran focused on the expense the defendants incurred and expressly disregarded that the parties' legal relationship had not changed as a result of the voluntary dismissal, and the Corcoran court construed "prevailing party" in light of the policies underlying the Copyright Act, rather than relying on the plain meaning of the phrase, as the Supreme Court did in Buckhannon.

The court also noted that its holding is consistent with every circuit court that has considered whether Buckhannon governs prevailing party status under the Copyright Act. See, e.g., Riviera Distribs., Inc. v. Jones, 517 F.3d 926 (7th Cir. 2008) (holding voluntary dismissal with prejudice of copyright claims confers prevailing party status on defendants under Buckhannon); Torres-Negron v. J & N Records, LLC, 504 F.3d 151 (1st Cir. 2007) (holding Buckhannon material alteration test applies to copyright claims and concluding dismissal for lack of subject matter jurisdiction does not confer prevailing party status); see also Bridgeport Music, Inc. v. London Music, U.K., 226 F. App'x 491 (6th Cir. 2007) (unpublished) (applying Buckhannon to copyright claims).

The Ninth Circuit concluded "Because the plaintiffs in this lawsuit remained free to refile their copyright claims against the defendants in federal court following their voluntary dismissal of the complaint, we hold the defendants are not prevailing parties and thus not entitled to the attorney's fees the district court awarded them."

Case summary: Emil Cadkin and Marty O'Toole prevailed in that all compositions have now been correctly credited to Cadkin via Broadcast Music Incorporated (BMI).

== Filmography ==
- The Big Fix (1947) (Music Score)
- Three on a Ticket (1947) (Music Score)
- Gunsmoke in Tucson (1958) (Musical Direction/Supervision, Songwriter)
- The Killer Shrews (1959) (Music Score)
- The Devil's Bedroom (1964) (Music Score)
- Navajo Run (1966) (Music Score, Screenwriter)

== Television series ==
- Real People (TV Series) (composer: theme music - 50 episodes) 1979-1984
- Tarzan (TV Series) (orchestrator - 7 episodes) 1967
- Lassie's Great Adventure (composer: stock music - uncredited) 1963
- Hazel (TV Series) (music editor - 40 episodes) 1961-1962
- Our Man Higgins (TV Series) (music supervisor - 1 episode) 1962
- Davey and Goliath (TV Series) (composer - 3 episodes) 1960-1962
- The Donna Reed Show (TV Series) (music editor - 40 episodes) 1961-1962
- Courageous Cat and Minute Mouse (TV Series) (composer - 93 episodes) 1960-1962
- Window on Main Street (TV Series) (music editor - 7 episodes) 1961
- Tallahassee 7000 (TV Series) (composer: theme music) 1961
- Quick Draw McGraw (TV Series) (composer - 37 episodes) 1959-1960
- Happy (TV Series) (composer: theme music) 1960
- The Ruff & Reddy Show (TV Series) (composer - 61 episodes) 1957-1960
- The Huckleberry Hound Show (TV Series) (composer - 1 episode) 1960
- Dennis the Menace (TV Series) (composer - 5 episodes) 1959
- Father Knows Best (TV Series) (composer - 203 episodes) 1954-1960

== Soundtrack ==
- SpongeBob SquarePants (TV Series) (music - 2002 - present)
- Camp Lazlo (TV Series) (music - 60 episodes) 2005-2008
- The Loud House (TV Series) (music - 1 episode) 2016
- Tender Waves (writer: "Busy People") 2013
- Paranormal Activity 4 (writer: "Alien Abduction", "Evil Alien Attack 1") 2012
- Frankenweenie (writer: "Death of the Alien 1") 2012
- The Rum Diary (writer: "Go Cat Go") 2011
- Boardwalk Empire (TV Series) (writer - 1 episode) 2010
- The Back-up Plan (writer: "Daisy Belle", "Golden Slippers") 2010
- The Mighty B! (TV Series) (music - 1 episode) 2009
- Public Enemies: The Golden Age of the Gangster Film (TV Movie documentary) (music: "Battle to the Death", "Lurching Monster" - uncredited) 2008
- Sunday Pants (TV Series) (music - 1 episode) 2005
- Jiminy Glick in Lalawood (writer: "Romantic Closing") 2004
- 30 Days Until I'm Famous (TV Movie) (arranger: "La Cucaracha") 2004
- Ren & Stimpy 'Adult Party Cartoon' (TV Series) (music - 2 episodes) 2003
- In America (writer: "Finger of Suspicion" Pt. 1) 2002
- Frida (writer: "Battle to the Death") 2002
- Boo Boo Runs Wild (TV Short) (music: "Eccentric Comedy (5-TC-300)" - uncredited) 1999
- The World's Greatest Magic 3 (TV Special) (music: "First Night" - uncredited) 1996
- Jimmy Hollywood ("Musical Excerpts") 1994
- Flesh and Bone (writer: "Music From 'The Untouchables' Original T.V. Series") 1993
- The Best of Benny Hill (music: "Foxtrot" - uncredited) 1974
- Night of the Living Dead (music: "Battle to the Death", "Finger of Suspicion" - uncredited) 1968
- Finders Keepers, Lovers Weepers! (music: "Let's Tango" - uncredited) 1968
- The Hellcats (music: "Come On Baby" - uncredited) 1968
- Out of This World (Short) (music: "Light Vermillion (PG-263)" - uncredited) 1964
- Century 21 Calling ... (Short) (music: "PG-263 - Light Vermillion", "PG-275 - Daffodil Yellow" - uncredited) 1962
- The Killer Shrews (music: "Finger of Suspicion 1", "Finger of Suspicion 2", "Cliffhanger 1" - uncredited) 1959
- Gunsmoke in Tucson (writer: "I Need a Man") 1958
- Gopher Broke (Short) (music: "Comic Cues #26" - uncredited) 1958
- Hook, Line and Stinker (Short) (music: "Puzzled Pup" - uncredited) 1958
- Space Master X-7 (music: "Whirlybirds" - uncredited) 1958
- The Gumby Show (TV Series) (music - 1 episode) 1957

== Composer ==
- Mission to Death 1966
- Navajo Run 1964
- The Devil's Bedroom 1964
- Shannon (TV Series) 1961
- The Hathaways (TV Series) 1961
- The Killer Shrews 1959
- Judge Roy Bean (TV Series) 1956
- Bury Me Dead 1947
- Philo Vance's Secret Mission 1947
- Heartaches 1947
- The Big Fix 1947
- Three on a Ticket 1947
- The Devil on Wheels 1947
