= Problem Girls =

1953 film by E. A. Dupont

- Directed by: E. A. Dupont
- Written by: Jack Pollexfen; Aubrey Wisberg
- Produced by: Jack Pollexfen; Aubrey Wisberg
- Starring: Helen Walker; Ross Elliott; Susan Morrow
- Cinematography: John L. Russell
- Edited by: Fred R. Feitshans Jr.
- Music by: Albert Glasser
- Production company: Columbia Pictures
- Distributed by: Columbia Pictures
- Release date: April 7, 1953
- Running time: 71 minutes
- Country: United States
- Language: English

Problem Girls is a 1953 American mystery film directed by E. A. Dupont and starring Helen Walker, Ross Elliott and Susan Morrow. The film is set in a private school for girls.

== Plot ==
Psychiatrist John Page seeks a quieter life in Los Angeles, and he applies for a teaching position at the Manning School for Girls. Dr. Manning, the founder of the school, has a drinking problem, and the school is managed by his associate, the domineering Miss Dixon. She warns John that the school is a haven for wealthy young women with behavioral problems.

At dinner that evening, one of the professors reveals that all the staff at the Manning School are unemployable. A few days later, Miss Dixon abruptly demands that John tend to Thorpe's wife Jean. John protests that he is not licensed to practice medicine. Because Dr. Manning is in an alcoholic stupor, John tentatively agrees to examine Jean, who apparently has attempted suicide.

Miss Dixon orders Thorpe not to allow John to visit Jean alone, but the next day, John sees Jean, and he is startled when she weakly discloses she is not married to Thorpe and has no clear memory of the suicide attempt. Miss Dixon catches John with Jean and declares that Manning will assume responsibility for Jean.

Later, John overhears a representative of the trustees of Jean Patterson's estate trying to arrange a meeting with Jean without success. Afterward, John sees Manning alone and expresses his concern about Jean, convinced that she is under a mysterious mental strain. He recommends the use of sodium pentathol to assist Jean in recovering her memory, but Miss Dixon returns and discharges John for his audacity. When he protests, she threatens to reveal that he treated Jean without a license.

Determined to help Jean, John sneaks back into her room and asks her if she will allow him to give her the injection of sodium pentathol. She agrees, and after the injection, discloses that she is not married to Thorpe and that she is not Jean Patterson. Miss Dixon and Thorpe break into the room before Jean can continue, and John is escorted off the school grounds.

The doctor tries to meet with the Patterson trustee, Mr. March, but finds he is unreachable. John then looks up the Patterson obituary and learns that Patterson was a wealthy oil magnate who died abruptly, leaving all his money to his only child, a daughter Jean. In newspaper articles, John read that the daughter is scheduled to inherit the money upon turning 21, and that after a mysterious fire at the Patterson country estate, an amnesia victim was identified as Jean by her husband, Max Thorpe.

John seeks more information at the hospital, and after he says he is a friend of Jean, they give him her personal effects. Among them, John discovers a photo of Jean and tracks down the photography studio, where he is startled to see a large portrait of Jean. The photographer identifies Jean as Babette Nelson, a top model who disappeared after she was involved in a car accident that killed her mother and best friend.

John contacts Richards and reveals his belief that Miss Dixon and Thorpe are attempting to get the Patterson estate and were using him as a witness for Jean's faked suicide after the inheritance came through. Richards helps John get back on campus, and John then asks one of the students to identify her, but she does not recognize the woman in Jean's room. John and Richards then question the superstitious Bella, who reveals that Thorpe beat the real Jean, who later died in surgery performed by Manning. John arranges a diversion among the students in order to smuggle Jean into the basement, and they overhear Miss Dixon's and Thorpe's discussing a plan to dig and relocate Jean's body.

In an attempt to escape, John and Jean struggle with Miss Dixon and Thorpe, and Miss Dixon produces a gun, which accidentally goes off, killing Thorpe. Later, the Manning School is renamed for Jean Patterson, and John and Babette decide to stay together at the school.

== Cast ==
- Helen Walker as Miss Dixon
- Ross Elliott as John Page
- Susan Morrow as Jean
- Anthony Jochim as Prof. Richards
- James Seay as Max Thorpe
- Marjorie Stapp as Bella
- Roy Regnier as Dr. Manning
- Eileen Stevens as Mrs. Kargen
- Tom Charlesworth as Prof. Clammerley
- Beverly Garland as Nancy Eaton
- Joyce Jameson as Peggy Carstairs
- Nan Leslie as Claire Harris
- Joyce Jarvis as Valerie Creighton
- Mara Corday as Dorothy Childers
- Tandra Quinn as Judith
- Norma Eberhardt as Louise, agoraphobic girl
- Eric Colmar as hospital intern
- Merritt Stone as Clanton (photographer)
- Walter Bonn as Mr. Carstairs
- John Oger as Henderson (groundskeeper)
- Gladys Kingston as Miss Fanshaw
- Juney Ellis as Miss Tippins

== Critical reception ==
Writing in AllMovie, critic Hal Erickson described the film as a "potboiler" that is "essentially an excuse to parade a group of buxom young starlets across the screen."

== Bibliography ==
- Deborah Del Vecchio. Beverly Garland: Her Life and Career. McFarland, 2012.
