= Marjorie Stapp =

American actress (1921–2014)

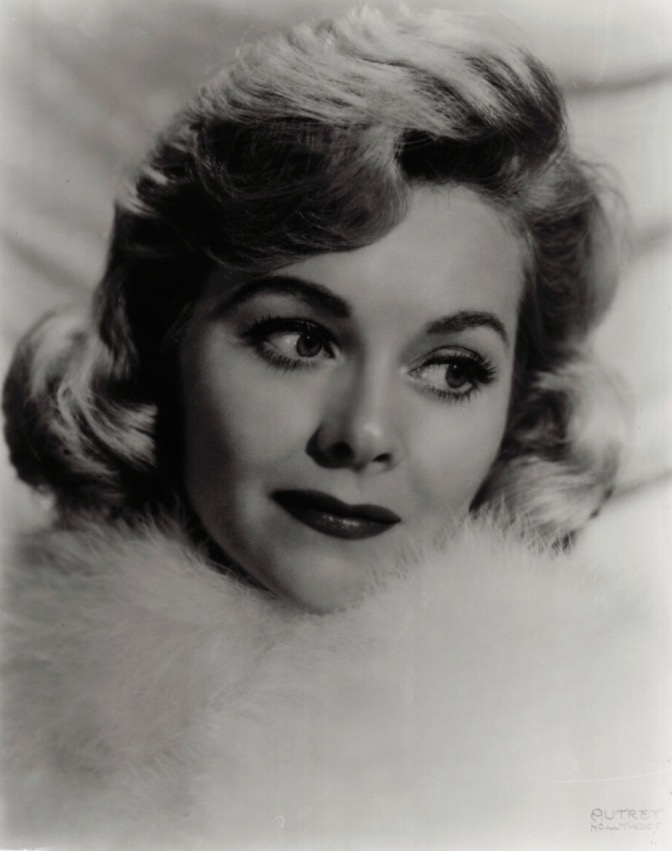
- Stapp c. 1950
- Born: September 17, 1921
- Died: June 2, 2014 (aged 92)
- Occupation: Actress
- Years active: 1945–1991
- Spouse: Robert Alan Browne

Marjorie Stapp (September 17, 1921 – June 2, 2014) was an American actress who was mainly in low-budget pictures.

== Biography ==
Stapp began her film career when she signed a contract with the film studio 20th Century-Fox in the 1940s. Her first screen appearance was in The Kid from Brooklyn, a 1946 film starring Danny Kaye. This was followed by another minor appearance in Linda, Be Good (1947). Eventually, she landed a leading role in the Western movie The Blazing Trail (1949) alongside Charles Starrett.

Throughout the 1950s until the 1990s, she appeared in both films and television, including Cheyenne, The George Burns and Gracie Allen Show, The Adventures of Ozzie and Harriet, The Life and Legend of Wyatt Earp, Dragnet, The Many Loves of Dobie Gillis, 77 Sunset Strip, The Brady Bunch, Quantum Leap and Columbo. Stapp retired in 1991.

== Partial filmography ==
- The Kid from Brooklyn (1946) – Girl Greeting Burleigh at Train Station (uncredited)
- Linda, Be Good (1947) – Cameo Girl (uncredited)
- Rimfire (1949) – Mary - Saloon Girl
- Laramie (1949) – (scenes deleted, uncredited)
- The Blazing Trail (1949) – Janet Masters
- Jolson Sings Again (1949) – Nurse (uncredited)
- Miss Grant Takes Richmond (1949) – Minor Role (uncredited)
- Without Honor (1949) – Neighbor's Wife
- And Baby Makes Three (1949) – Peggy (uncredited)
- Adventures of Sir Galahad (1949, Serial) – Queen Guinevere
- The Petty Girl (1950) – Minor Role (uncredited)
- Rookie Fireman (1950) – Blonde (uncredited)
- Emergency Wedding (1952) – Mrs. Young (uncredited)
- The Steel Trap (1952) – Travel Agent
- Sword of Venus (1953) – Duchess De Villefort
- The Blue Gardenia (1953) – Policewoman (uncredited)
- Problem Girls (1953) – Bella
- Port Sinister (1953) – Technician
- A Blueprint for Murder (1953) – Nurse (uncredited)
- Marry Me Again (1953) – W.A.C. (uncredited)
- The Far Country (1954) – Girl (uncredited)
- Cell 2455 Death Row (1955) – Madeline (uncredited)
- 5 Against the House (1955) – Girl (uncredited)
- Illegal (1955) – Night Orderly (uncredited)
- The Lieutenant Wore Skirts (1956) – Mother in laundromat
- Indestructible Man (1956) – Hysterical Young Woman
- Terror at Midnight (1956) – Waitress (uncredited)
- The Revolt of Mamie Stover (1956) – Minor Role (uncredited)
- The Werewolf (1956) – Min (uncredited)
- I've Lived Before (1956) – Spectator (uncredited)
- Scandal Incorporated (1956) – Alice Yoland
- Julie (1956) – Cliff's Secretary (uncredited)
- Gun for a Coward (1956) – Rose
- Kronos (1957) – Nurse
- Shoot-Out at Medicine Bend (1957) – Townswoman (uncredited)
- The Monster That Challenged the World (1957) – Connie Blake
- The Daughter of Dr. Jekyll (1957) – Woman Getting Dressed
- The Girl Most Likely (1957) – Tall Blonde (uncredited)
- Suicide Battalion (1958) – Beverly
- The Saga of Hemp Brown (1958) – Mrs. Ford (uncredited)
- The Young Captives (1959) – Murdered Blonde
- Elmer Gantry (1960) – Lady in Red on Christmas Eve (uncredited)
- Let No Man Write My Epitaph (1960) – Ruthie (uncredited)
- Battle at Bloody Beach (1961) – Caroline Pelham
- The Wild Westerners (1962) – Lily (uncredited)
- A Gathering of Eagles (1963) – Ann Morse (uncredited)
