= Dragon's Gold =

1954 film by Aubrey Wisberg

- Directed by: Aubrey Wisberg; Jack Pollexfen
- Written by: Aubrey Wisberg; Jack Pollexfen
- Produced by: Edward Small (executive); Aubrey Wisberg; Jack Pollexfen
- Starring: John Archer; Hillary Brooke; Philip Van Zandt
- Cinematography: Stanley Cortez
- Edited by: Fred R. Feitshans Jr.
- Music by: Albert Glasser
- Production company: Wisberg-Pollexfen Productions
- Distributed by: United Artists
- Release date: February 10, 1954
- Running time: 70 minutes
- Country: United States
- Language: English

Dragon's Gold is a 1954 American crime film directed by Aubrey Wisberg and Jack Pollexfen and starring John Archer, Hillary Brooke and Philip Van Zandt.

== Cast ==
- John Archer as Mack Rossiter
- Hillary Brooke as Vivian Crosby
- Noel Cravat as General Wong Kai Hai
- Philip Van Zandt as Sen
- Marvin Press as Cheng
- Dayton Lumis as Donald McCutcheon
- William Kerwin as Gene
