= Marian Carr =

American actress (1926–2003)

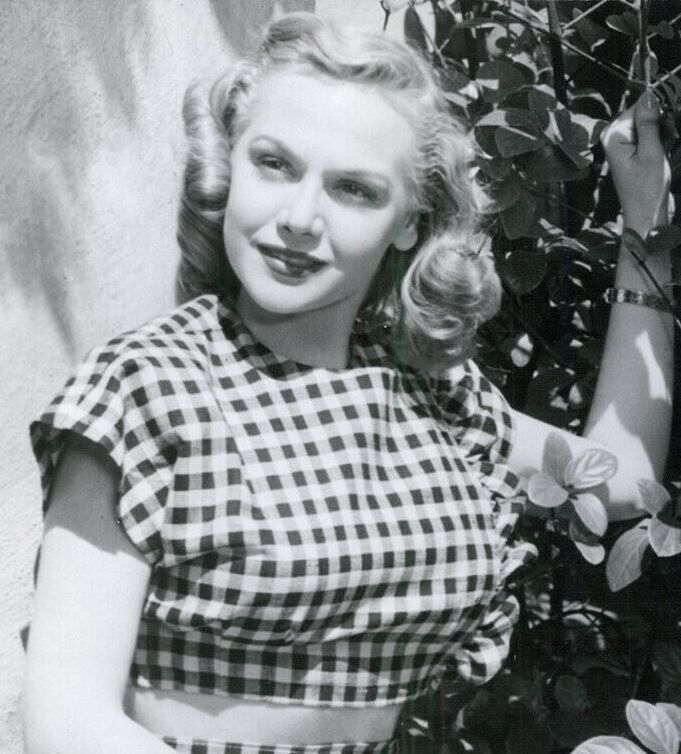
- Carr in 1947
- Born: Marion Dorice Dunn; July 6, 1926; Providence, Kentucky, U.S.
- Died: July 30, 2003 (aged 77); Palm Desert, California, U.S.
- Other names: Marion Carr; Marian Carr Mason
- Occupation: Actress
- Spouses: Frederick Levy (m. 1948; div. 1954) Lester Linsk (m. 1958; div. 1966)
- Children: 1

Marian Carr (born Marion Dorice Dunn; July 6, 1926 – July 30, 2003), sometimes credited as Marion Carr, was an American actress who appeared in a number of films in the late 1940s through the 1950s.

== Early life ==
Carr was born July 6, 1926, in Providence, Kentucky. In her adolescence, she relocated with her family to Chicago, Illinois, where she attended Austin High School.

== Career ==
After graduating high school, Carr worked in an office as well as taking jobs modeling in Chicago. She was spotted by a talent scout and was named "Chicago's Prettiest Office Worker" in 1946. Following this, Carr relocated to Los Angeles, where she began acting in local theater productions. She subsequently signed a film contract with RKO Pictures in 1946 under Howard Hughes. She made her feature film debut in San Quentin (1946), followed by a minor part in Frank Capra's 1946 It's a Wonderful Life. Carr had lead roles in several films, including the Westerns The Devil Thumbs a Ride (1947) and Northern Patrol (1953).

After divorcing Levy in 1954, she returned to acting with supporting roles in Ring of Fear (1954), and two film noir by director Robert Aldrich: World for Ransom (1954) and cult classic Kiss Me Deadly (1955), in the latter of which she portrayed the sister of a mobster. Carr appeared in several other films, such as the unique L.A. noir horror film ‘’Indestructible Man’’, as a recovering stripper girlfriend of the lead cop, Western Ghost Town (1956), before making her final feature film appearance in Nightmare (also 1956) before retiring.

== Personal life ==
After marrying Frederick Levy, an executive for Blum Candy, Carr took a temporary hiatus from acting, and resided in San Francisco, where she gave birth to a son in 1952.

Carr later married television producer Lester Linsk in 1958, though the marriage ended in divorce in 1966. She subsequently married Francis Jerome Mason.

== Death ==
Carr died in Palm Desert, California, on July 30, 2003.

== Filmography ==
=== Film ===
Year	Title	Role	Director	Notes	Ref.
1946	Twin Husbands	Harriet	Hal Yates	Short film	
1946	San Quentin	Betty Rogers	Gordon Douglas		
1946	It's a Wonderful Life	Jane Wainright	Frank Capra		
1947	The Devil Thumbs a Ride	Diane Ferguson	Felix E. Feist		
1953	Northern Patrol	Quebec Kid	Rex Bailey		
1954	World for Ransom	Frennessey March	Robert Aldrich		
1954	Ring of Fear	Valerie St. Dennis	James Edward Grant		
1955	Ingrid - The Story of a Fashion Model	Mannequin	Géza von Radványi		
1955	Cell 2455 Death Row	Doll	Fred F. Sears		
1955	Kiss Me Deadly	Friday	Robert Aldrich		
1955	The Seven Little Foys	Chorine	Melville Shavelson		
1956	When Gangland Strikes	Hazel	R. G. Springsteen		
1956	Indestructible Man	Eve Martin	Jack Pollexfen		
1956	The Harder They Fall	Alice	Mark Robson		
1956	Ghost Town	Barbara Leighton	Allen H. Miner		
1956	Nightmare	Madge Novick	Maxwell Shane		

=== Television ===
Year	Title	Role	Notes	Ref.
1952	China Smith	Anya Karenski	Episode: "Shanghai Clipper"	
1953	The Loretta Young Show	Doreen	Episode: "Kid Stuff"	
1953	Four Star Playhouse	Alice Dana	Episode: "The Witness"	
1954	Schlitz Playhouse	Anne	Episode: "At the Natchez Inn"	
1954	The Whistler	Paula Layton	Episode: "Cup O'Gold"	
1955	The Red Skelton Hour	Secretary	Episode: "Honeymooner's Spoof"	
1955	The Millionaire	Vie Harrington	Episode: "The Don Lewis Story"	
1963	The Doctors	Mrs. Gardella	Episode: "#1.73"	

== Sources ==
- Koper, Richard (2010). Fifties Blondes: Sexbombs, Sirens, Bad Girls and Teen Queens. Duncan, Oklahoma: BearManor Media. ISBN 978-1-593-93521-4.
