= Port Sinister =

1953 film

- Theatrical release insert poster
- Directed by: Harold Daniels
- Written by: Aubrey Wisberg; Jack Pollexfen
- Produced by: Jack Pollexfen; Aubrey Wisberg
- Starring: James Warren; Lynne Roberts; Paul Cavanagh; William Schallert; House Peters, Jr.
- Cinematography: William Bradford
- Edited by: Fred R. Feitshans Jr.
- Music by: Albert Glasser
- Distributed by: RKO Radio Pictures
- Release dates: April 3, 1953 (Premiere-Los Angeles); April 10, 1953 (US)
- Running time: 65 minutes
- Country: United States
- Language: English

Port Sinister (a.k.a., Beast of Paradise Isle in the UK) is an American independently made black-and-white adventure science fiction film produced by Jack Pollexfen and Albert Zugsmith and directed by Harold Daniels. It was released in 1953. The film was written by Jack Pollexfen and Aubrey Wisberg and stars James Warren, Lynne Roberts, and Paul Cavanagh. Port Sinister was theatrically distributed by RKO Radio Pictures.

The film's storyline involves the 17th-century Caribbean city Port Royal in the mid-20th century. The city sank beneath the waves due to a 1907 earthquake. A scientist believes that portions of the city will soon resurface due to volcanic activity. Thugs attack him and steal his research material, eager to search for rumored pirate gold in the city. Two groups of treasure hunters fight over the treasure in the city's ruins, before being attacked by giant crabs. Everyone involved then tries to flee a volcanic eruption.

== Plot ==
In the mid-17th century, the Caribbean city of Port Royal was thriving, but was heavily damaged in 1692 by an earthquake and suffered numerous hurricanes which prevented it from regaining its former glory. A 1907 earthquake caused the city to sink beneath the waves.

Tony, a scientist, believes that older portions of the city will soon become visible because of predicted volcanic activity and, after obtaining grant funding, wants to investigate.

Before arriving on the island, thugs local to the area plan to steal all the gold when Port Royal becomes visible. They attack Tony, leaving him hospitalized, and steal his research material in their quest to find the rumored pirate gold.

Tony escapes the hospital and arranges passage to the island. He is forced to take Joan with him, and she is disgruntled at being forced to accompany an exhibition whose theory she finds unlikely.

The ruins become visible, as predicted, and the criminals obtain the treasure. The two groups happen to meet and are suddenly attacked by giant crabs. Volcanoes begin to erupt as the two groups fight for the treasure and try to escape the sinking city.

== Production ==
Pollexfen and Wisberg had already made Captive Women and Sword of Venus for RKO. Port Sinister was filmed at the RKO studios with location work at Palos Verdes, California. It is the third and final film made by American Pictures Company by these producers. The movie had the working titles Port Royal—Ghost City Beneath the Sea, Sunken City and City Beneath the Sea. It was based on the real city of Port Royal.

== Reception ==
Variety found the film to be a very mediocre melodrama. According to the book RKO Radio Pictures, the movie was boring and had dark filming and insufficient lead acting; however, the villains of the movie were interesting. Leonard Maltin gave the movie two of four stars, liking its premise but finding the acting and crab effects lacking.
