= Scheyer =

Scheyer is a surname. Notable people with the surname include:

- Christine Scheyer (born 1994), Austrian alpine ski racer
- Galka Scheyer (1889–1945), German-American art collector and painter
- Jon Scheyer (born 1987), American-Israeli basketball player and coach
