= Captive Women =

1952 American film by Stuart Gilmore

- Directed by: Stuart Gilmore
- Written by: Jack Pollexfen; Aubrey Wisberg
- Produced by: Jack Pollexfen; Aubrey Wisberg
- Starring: Robert Clarke; Ron Randell; Margaret Field; Gloria Saunders
- Cinematography: Paul Ivano
- Edited by: Fred R. Feitshans Jr.
- Music by: Charles Koff
- Production company: Albert Zugsmith Productions
- Distributed by: RKO Radio Pictures
- Release date: October 10, 1952 (U.S.)
- Running time: 64 minutes
- Country: United States
- Language: English
- Budget: $85,000

Captive Women (U.K. title 3000 A.D.) is a 1952 American post-apocalyptic science-fiction film directed by Stuart Gilmore and starring Robert Clarke, Margaret Field and William Schallert. The plot concerns the effects of a nuclear war.

== Plot ==
Long after a nuclear war, the last human survivors are divided into three tribes. Robert and Ruth are about to be married in the ruins of a post-apocalyptic New York City during a brief interlude in ongoing hostilities between their tribe, the Norms, and the Mutates, a rival tribe. The Mutates adhere to the tenets of the Bible, which is rejected by the Norms.

Raiders from a third tribe, the Upriver People, attack through the Hudson River Tunnel and capture Ruth and several other women because they desperately need fertile females. The Norms and Mutates must set aside their differences to rescue the women. The Upriver People are defeated and are trapped in the tunnel as it is flooded. The women are recovered, and there are improved prospects for more peaceful relations among the tribes.

== Cast ==
- Robert Clarke as Robert
- Margaret Field as Ruth
- Gloria Saunders as Catherine
- Ron Randell as Riddon
- William Schallert as Carver

== Production ==
Producers Jack Pollexfen and Aubrey Wisberg had a deal to create three films at RKO Radio Pictures: Captive Women and two films that were later produced, Sword of Venus and Port Sinister. Studio owner Howard Hughes insisted that Stuart Gilmore, one of Hughes' leading editors, should direct the film. Robert Clarke later recalled:

[Gilmore] was lost. Completely. The poor man had tremendous problems; there were too many people in the cast, too many actors with no dialogue in the scenes, and the fact that they had over-extended themselves for special effects ... The whole film was ineffectual. Pollexfen and Wisberg were trying to make a better picture—sometimes, Hollywood thinks that if you spend more money, you make a better picture. Well, this is one instance where that didn’t happen. Gilmore was in over his head—he didn’t know directing, and l don’t think he ever did another picture because he got a bad taste in his mouth from this one.

According to William Schallert, the film was rewritten during the shoot and the actors were required to constantly learn new parts.

The film had working titles of 3000 AD and 1000 Years from Now, but RKO wanted a more sensational title. However, when the film was rereleased In 1956, it bore the title of 1000 Years from Now.

Filming began on July 9, 1951. The film's budget was approximately $85,000.

== Reception ==
The Monthly Film Bulletin wrote: "This preposterous story contrives to be both childish and disagreeable. The action comprises scenes of flogging and torture, a sort of Sabine raid on the scantily dressed Norm women, much chasing to and fro of strangely costumed tribesmen armed with bows and arrows, and some 'uplift' dialogue – the Mutates have kept their faith in God, the Norms worship the Devil. The treatment is on a level more often found in the serials than in a feature film.

Variety wrote: "Most of the acting is in the serial film tradition although Ron Randell occasionally shows himself as a first-rate actor, He is the hero. Both Margaret Field and Gloria Saunders partially make up in looks for what they lack in terp ability. Robert Clarke, Stuart Randall, Paula Dorety and Robert Bice head the large supporting cast. Stuart Gilmore's direction is standard for this type of pic. Sharp editing by Fred R. Feltshans keeps it from getting too far out of hand. Paul Ivano has contributed a good camera job."
