= Return to Treasure Island (film) =

1954 film by Ewald André Dupont

- Directed by: Ewald André Dupont
- Written by: Jack Pollexfen; Aubrey Wisberg
- Based on: Treasure Island by Robert Louis Stevenson
- Produced by: Jack Pollexfen; Aubrey Wisberg
- Starring: Tab Hunter; Dawn Addams; Porter Hall
- Narrated by: Tab Hunter
- Cinematography: William Bradford
- Edited by: Fred R. Feitshans Jr.
- Music by: Paul Sawtell
- Production company: World Pictures
- Distributed by: United Artists
- Release date: June 30, 1954
- Running time: 75 minutes
- Country: United States
- Language: English

Return to Treasure Island is a 1954 American adventure film directed by Ewald André Dupont and starring Tab Hunter, Dawn Addams and Porter Hall. Shot in Pathécolor it was distributed by United Artists. The film is about modern-day adventurers (circa 1950s) exploring the desert island from Robert Louis Stevenson's frequently filmed 1883 novel Treasure Island. Though Stevenson's story was fictional, it is treated as historical for the purposes of the film's plot.

== Cast ==
- Tab Hunter as Clive Stone
- Dawn Addams as Jamesina "Jamie" Hawkins
- Porter Hall as Maximillian "Maxie" Harris
- James Seay as Felix Newman
- Harry Lauter as Parker
- William Cottrell as Cookie
- Lane Chandler as Capt. Cardigan
- Henry Rowland as Williams
- Dayton Lummis as Captain Flint
- Robert Long as Long John Silver
- Ken Terrell as Thompson

== Production ==
Location filming took place at Palos Verdes. In September 1953 a deal was signed where the film would be distributed by UA under the Edward Small banner.

== Reception ==
According to Tab Hunter, the film "prompted Dawn Addams to immediately marry Prince Don Vittorio Massimo and move to Italy. It prompted Dupont to never make another movie. His decision or not, I don't know. For my part, whatever strides I’d made as an actor were lost in the stink of this fiasco. Even my mother weighed in with a brutally frank assessment: “You were lousy,’ she pronounced, bolting from the theater lobby."

Variety said the film "shapes up favorably for its intended market. For despite an implausible pulp fiction story, Return to Treasure Island does better than par the course in sex, gunplay, chicanery and aquatic scenery."

== See also ==
- Long John Silver, a 1954 American-Australian film directed by Byron Haskin starring Robert Newton as Long John Silver
