= William Schallert =

American actor (1922-2016)

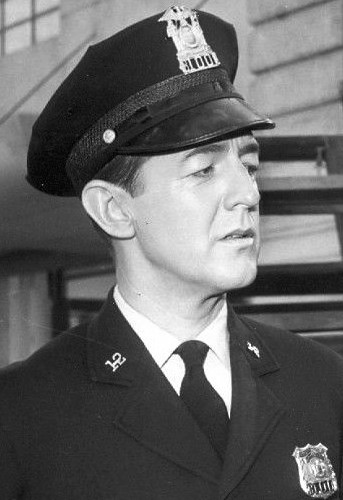
- Schallert in The Twilight Zone, 1960
- Born: William Joseph Schallert; July 6, 1922; Los Angeles, California, U.S.
- Died: May 8, 2016 (aged 93); Pacific Palisades, California, U.S.
- Other name: Bill Schallert
- Education: University of California, Los Angeles
- Occupation: Actor
- Years active: 1947–2014
- Known for: Richard Diamond, Private Detective; Death Valley Days; The Patty Duke Show; The Many Loves of Dobie Gillis
- Spouse: Leah Waggner (m. 1949; died 2015)
- Children: 4

President of the Screen Actors Guild
- In office 1979–1981
- Preceded by: Kathleen Nolan
- Succeeded by: Ed Asner

William Joseph Schallert (July 6, 1922 – May 8, 2016) was an American character actor who appeared in dozens of television shows and films over a career spanning more than 60 years. He is known for his roles on Richard Diamond, Private Detective (1957–1959), Death Valley Days (1955–1962), and The Patty Duke Show (1963–1966).

== Early life ==
William Schallert was born in Los Angeles, California, the son of Edwin Francis Schallert, a longtime drama critic for the Los Angeles Times, and Elza Emily Schallert (née Baumgarten), a magazine writer and radio host. He began acting while a student at the University of California, Los Angeles (UCLA) but left to become an Army Air Corps fighter pilot in World War II. He returned to UCLA after the war and was graduated in 1946. In 1946, he helped found the Circle Theatre, now known as El Centro Theatre, with Sydney Chaplin and several fellow students and was a member of the Circle Players there. In 1948, Schallert was directed by Sydney's father, Charlie Chaplin, in a staging of W. Somerset Maugham's Rain. In 1949, Schallert served as the reciter in a concert performance of Arnold Schoenberg's Ode to Napoleon in celebration of the composer's 75th birthday.

== Career ==
Schallert appeared in supporting roles on numerous television programs starting in the early 1950s, including four episodes (and three different characters) in Dick Powell's Zane Grey Theatre between 1958 and 1961. He was in three episodes of The Rifleman and five episodes of Gunsmoke : season 3, episode 16 "Twelfth Night" in 1957, season 4, episode 16 "Gypsum Hills Feud" in 1958, and as Col. Grant in season 7, episode 27 "Wagon Girls" in 1962, banker Ezra Thorpe in "The Money Store" season 14, episode 14 and Jake Spence in season 15 episode 20 "Albert". Schallert portrayed farmer Sam Becker in a 1961 episode of The Andy Griffith Show, whose newborn son is delivered by Andy. He was a Nazi doctor in a 1967 episode of The Rat Patrol. He appeared in The Partridge Family as a very humble folk-singing guitar player in "Stage Fright" in 1971. He appeared three times as Major Karl Richmond on NBC's Steve Canyon, starring Dean Fredericks in the title role.

Schallert also appeared in several films. He had roles in The Man from Planet X (1951) with Robert Clarke, The Tarnished Angels (1958) with Robert Stack, Blue Denim (1959) with Brandon deWilde, Pillow Talk (1959) with Doris Day and Rock Hudson, In the Heat of the Night (1967) with Sidney Poitier, Speedway (1968) with Elvis Presley, The Jerk (1979) with Steve Martin, Teachers (1984) with Nick Nolte, and Innerspace (1987), in which he played Martin Short's doctor.

Among eight appearances on the syndicated western anthology series Death Valley Days, Schallert in 1955 portrayed American Civil War General Jesse Lee Reno in the episode "Reno." In the story line, two veterans of the Mexican War who served under Reno (played by Frank Griffin and Stanley Clements) honor him with the naming of the second-largest city in Nevada. He appeared as Sam Clemens in a 1962 episode, "The $275,000 Sack of Flour." He appeared in a 1992 episode of In the Heat of the Night as a man suspected of killing his terminally ill wife, thus appearing in both the 1967 film and the TV series as different characters.

Schallert starred in Philbert, an innovative 1964 television pilot for ABC, which combined live-action camera work and animation. It was created by Warner Bros. animator Friz Freleng and directed by Richard Donner. ABC backed out of the series shortly before full production was to begin, although the completed pilot was released in theaters by Warner Brothers as a short subject.

Schallert was probably best known as Martin Lane on The Patty Duke Show. In 2004, TV Guide recognized Schallert's portrayal of Martin Lane on The Patty Duke Show as No. 39 on its list of "50 Greatest TV Dads." He also appeared as a wise teacher, Mr. Leander Pomfritt, on The Many Loves of Dobie Gillis and as "The Admiral" on Get Smart. On the two former shows he worked opposite actress Jean Byron. Schallert made three guest appearances on CBS's Perry Mason between 1957 and 1962, including the role of Donald Graves in the series' fifth episode "The Case of the Sulky Girl," as Dr. Bradbury in the 1961 episode "The Case of the Misguided Missile," and as Len Dykes in the 1962 episode "The Case of the Melancholy Marksman." He played the role of Nilz Baris in the Star Trek episode "The Trouble with Tribbles"; and much later he portrayed Varani, a Bajoran musician, in the Star Trek: Deep Space Nine episode "Sanctuary."

Schallert played the role of Carson Drew in the television series The Hardy Boys/Nancy Drew Mysteries (1977–1979), featuring Pamela Sue Martin as Nancy Drew. In addition to his onscreen performances, Schallert did voice-over work for numerous television and radio commercials over the years. Among these was a recurring role as "Milton the Toaster" in animated commercials for Kellogg's Pop-Tarts. He later voiced Velma's high school teacher Professor Pomfrit and recurring character Neville Poppenbacher in two episodes of What's New, Scooby-Doo?.

=== Later career/SAG president ===
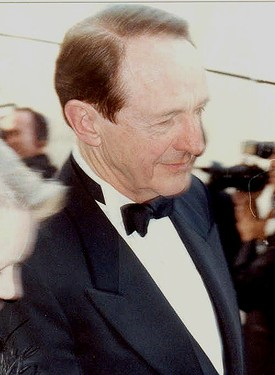
Schallert at the 62nd Academy Awards in 1990

Schallert served as president of the Screen Actors Guild (SAG) from 1979 to 1981, and afterwards remained active in SAG projects, including serving as a trustee of the SAG Pension and Health Plans since 1983, and of the Motion Picture and Television Fund since 1977. His former co-star and television daughter, Patty Duke, also served as SAG president from 1985 to 1988. During Schallert's tenure as SAG president, he founded the Committee for Performers with Disabilities, and in 1993 he was awarded the Ralph Morgan Award for service to the Guild.

Schallert continued to work steadily as an actor in later life, appearing in a 2007 episode of How I Met Your Mother, the HBO television film Recount (2008) as U.S. Supreme Court Associate Justice John Paul Stevens, and the HBO series True Blood; his distinctive voice brought him work for commercial and animation voiceovers. Appearances in 2009 included a guest role on Desperate Housewives on March 15, in which he played the role of a small newspaper editor; he also appeared in an episode of According to Jim. More recently, he appeared in the January 21, 2010, pilot episode of The Deep End on ABC as a retiring CEO with Alzheimer's disease. He also made an appearance on Medium on the February 5, 2010, episode and a cameo on the June 26, 2011, season premiere of True Blood as the mayor of Bon Temps. He played Max Devore in the A&E adaptation of Bag of Bones.

In 2010, Schallert made a series of public service announcement videos with Patty Duke and other castmates from The Patty Duke Show for the Social Security Administration. His last television appearance came in 2014 on an episode of the sitcom 2 Broke Girls.

== Personal life ==
In a 2014 interview, Schallert said that he was suffering from peripheral neuropathy, forcing him to wear leg braces and use a wheelchair. He said about his condition and the leg braces: "They help me stay balanced if I use a walker, but it's just easier to get around in a wheelchair." While not ruling out working on stage in the future, he said: "Working in film or TV would be too difficult now. Besides, I did my share!"

Schallert was married to actress Leah Waggner (born Rosemarie Diann Waggner) from 1949 until her death in 2015. She appeared with him in various shows, including episodes of The Patty Duke Show and The Dick Van Dyke Show. They had four sons: William Joseph, Jr. (born 1949), Edwin G. (born 1952), Mark M. (born 1954), and Brendan C. Schallert (born 1961).

== Death ==
Schallert died on May 8, 2016, at his home in Pacific Palisades at the age of 93, six weeks after the death of his on-screen daughter Patty Duke, on March 29. They were both also presidents of the Screen Actor's Guild (SAG), Schallert from 1979–1981 and Duke from 1985–1988.

== Filmography ==
=== Film ===
Year	Title	Role	Notes
1947	Doctor Jim	George Brant	
1950	Lonely Heart Bandits	Dave Clark	
1951	The Man from Planet X	Dr. Mears	
1951	The Red Badge of Courage	Union Soldier	Uncredited
1952	Rose of Cimarron	Gold Bullion Guard	
1952	Just This Once	Secretary	Scenes deleted
1952	Storm Over Tibet	Aylen	
1952	Captive Women	Carver	
1952	Flat Top	Ensign Longfellow	
1953	Sword of Venus	Valmont	
1953	Port Sinister	Collins	
1954	Down Three Dark Streets	Gas Station Attendant	Uncredited
1954	Riot in Cell Block 11	Reporter	
1954	Them!	Ambulance Attendant	Uncredited
1954	The High and the Mighty	Dispatcher	
1954	Gog	Engel	
1954	Shield for Murder	Assistant District Attorney	
1955	Smoke Signal	Private Livingston	
1955	An Annapolis Story	Tony's Instructor	Scenes deleted
1955	Top of the World	Captain Harding	
1955	Hell's Horizon	Ben Morgan	
1956	Raw Edge	Missionary	
1956	Gunslinger	Marshal Scott Hood	
1956	Written on the Wind	Reporter	
1957	The Incredible Shrinking Man	Arthur Bramson	
1957	The Tattered Dress	Court Clerk	
1957	The Girl in the Kremlin	Jacob Stalin	
1957	The Story of Mankind	Earl of Warwick	
1957	The Tarnished Angels	Ted Baker	
1957	Man in the Shadow	Jim Shaney	
1958	Cry Terror!	Henderson	
1959	Pillow Talk	Hotel Clerk	
1960	The Gallant Hours	Thomas George Lanphier Jr.	
1962	Lonely Are the Brave	Harry	
1962	Paradise Alley	Jack Williams	
1963	Shotgun Wedding	Theodore Parsons	
1967	In the Heat of the Night	Mayor Schubert	
1967	Hour of the Gun	Herman Spicer	
1967	Will Penny	Dr. Fraker	
1968	Speedway	Abel Esterlake	
1969	Sam Whiskey	Mr. Perkins	
1969	The Computer Wore Tennis Shoes	Professor Quigley	
1970	Colossus: The Forbin Project	CIA Director Grauber	
1970	Tora! Tora! Tora!	Harry Hopkins	Scenes deleted
1972	The Trial of the Catonsville Nine	Judge	
1973	Charley Varrick	Bill Horton	
1973	Peege	Dad	Short film
1975	The Strongest Man in the World	Professor Quigley	
1976	Tunnel Vision	Francis Cody	
1980	Hangar 18	Professor Mills	
1981	Peter-No-Tail	Father (voice)	English version
1983	Twilight Zone: The Movie	Father	Segment: "It's a Good Life"
1984	Teachers	Horn	
1987	Innerspace	Dr. Greenbush	
1991	House Party 2	Dean Kramer	
1993	Beethoven 2	Steve	Uncredited
1993	Matinee	Leonard Grabow DDS, a dentist who appears in Mant!	Uncredited
2007	Sweetzer	Barnaby	
2009	Green Lantern: First Flight	Appa Ali Apsa (voice)	Direct-to-video

=== Television ===
Year	Title	Role	Notes
1951–1952	Space Patrol	(1) Craig (2) Stuart	(1) S1:E31, "The Hidden Reflector" (1951) (2) Season 2 Episode 3: "Lost in the Snow-Cap Region of Mars" (1952)
1954–1958	Climax!	(1) Young Farmer (2) David	(1) S1:E7, "An Error in Chemistry" (1954) (2) S3:E33, "The Trial of Captain Wirtz" (1957) (3) Season 4 Episode 33: "House of Doubt" (1958)
1955–1956	It's a Great Life	(1) Telephone Man (2) Travel Bureau Clerk	(1) S2:E14, "The Private Line" (1955) (2) S2:E33, "The Palm Springs Story" (1956)
1955–1956	Matinee Theatre	(2) Henry	(1) S1:E40, "The Red Sanders Story" (1955) (2) Season 1 Episode 96: "The Big Guy" (1956)
1955–1956	Lux Video Theatre	(1) Sam Carter (2) Thompson (3) Ferguson (4) Ben (5) Hall	(1) Season 5 Episode 26: "The Copperhead" (1955) (2) S5:E36, "The Great McGinty" (1955) (3) Season 5 Episode 38: "Eight Iron Men" (1955) (4) S6:E9, "Miss Susie Slagle's" (1955) (5) S6:E38, "A House of His Own" (1956)
1955–1962	Death Valley Days	(1) Mr. Loomis (2) Albert Johnson (3) Jesse Lee Reno (4) Ellis Higby (5) Gate Guard (6) Charlie Tetlow (7) Carl Sprenger (8) Dave Meiser (9) Sam Clemens	(1) S3:E12, "Million Dollar Wedding" (1955) (2) S3:E16, "Death Valley Scotty" (1955) (3) Season 4 Episode 1: "Reno" (1955) (4) Season 8 Episode 8: "Hang 'Em High" (1959) (5) S8:E10, "The Little Trooper" (1959) (6) Season 8 Episode 32: "Cap'n Pegleg" (1960) (7) S10:E17, "Justice at Jackson Creek" (1962) (8) S10:E21, "The Breaking Point" (1962) (9) S11:E2, "The $275,000 Sack of Flour" (1962)
1956	Schlitz Playhouse	Lieutenant Lawton	Season 5 Episode 40: "The Mechanical Cook"
1957	Whirlybirds	Fred Jaffy	Season 1 Episode 30: "Fury Canyon"
1957	Mr. Adams and Eve	(1) Claude (2) Briggs	(1) Season 1 Episode 4: "The Teen-Age Daughter" (2) Season 2 Episode 3: "International Affair"
1957	Leave It to Beaver	Mr. Bloomgarden	Season 1 Episode 11: "Beaver's Short Pants"
1957	The Gray Ghost	Ebans	Season 1 Episode 19: "Russell of 'The Times'"
1957–1958	The Adventures of Jim Bowie	(1) (2) (3) (4) (5) (6) (7) (8) Justinian Tebbs (5) Teeters Hill (played both characters in 5th Episode)	(1) Season 1 Episode 25: "German George" (1957) (2) S1:E27, "The Captain's Chimp" (1957) (3) S1:E31, "The Pearl and the Crown" (1957) (4) Season 1 Episode 33: "The Lottery" (1957) (5) S1:E37, "The Bounty Hunter" (1957) (6) Season 2 Episode 19: "The Close Shave" (1958) (7) S2:E22, "Home Sweet Home" (1958) (8) Season 2 Episode 38: "The Puma" (1958)
1957–1959	Richard Diamond, Private Detective	(1) Charlie (2) Johnny Prescott (3) Charlie Kane	(1) S1:E10, "The Pete Rocco Case" (1957) (2) Season 3 Episode 16: "Rough Cut" (1959) (3) Season 3 Episode 20: "Act of Grace" (1959)
1957—1962	Perry Mason	(1) Donald Graves (2) Dr. Bradbury (3) Len Dykes	(1) S1:E5, "The Case of the Sulky Girl" (1957) (2) Season 4 Episode 25: "The Case of the Misguided Missile" (1961) (3) Season 5 Episode 24: "The Case of the Melancholy Marksman" (1962)
1957–1963	Have Gun – Will Travel	(1) Clyde Broderick (2) Cavalry Corporal (3) Dallas Burchfield (4) Chee Yan	(1) Season 1 Episode 10: "The Long Night" (1957) (2) S1:E24, "Girl from Piccadilly" (1958) (3) Season 5 Episode 18: "Justice in Hell" (1962) (4) S6:E29, "The Lady of the Fifth Moon" (1963)
1957–1973	Gunsmoke	(1) Eben Hakes (2) Alben Peavy (3) Captain Grant (4) Jess (5) Ezra Thorpe (6) Jake Spence (7) Judge Ray Cordelius	(1) Season 3 Episode 16: "Twelfth Night" (1957) (2) S4:E16, "Gypsum Fields Feud" (1958) (3) Season 7 Episode 27: "Wagon Girls" (1962) (4) S8:E35, "Daddy Went Away" (1963) (5) S14:E14, "The Money Store" (1968) (6) Season 15 Episode 20: "Albert" (1970) (7) Season 19 Episode 3: "Matt's Love Story" (1973)
1958	Father Knows Best	Jennings	Season 5 Episode 9: "Betty, the Pioneer Woman"
1958	The Silent Service	Kennedy	Season 2 Episode 38: "Seanettle vs. U-Boat"
1958	The Texan	Arnold Leno	Season 1 Episode 3: "The Troubled Town"
1958	Sugarfoot	Cole	Season 1 Episode 11: "Deadlock"
1958	Hey, Jeannie!	Herbert	(1) Season 2 Episode 3: "The Orphan" (2) Season 2 Episode 4: "The Bet" (3) Season 2 Episode 5: "The Highway" (4) Season 2 Episode 6: "The Rainmaker"
1958–1959	Wanted: Dead or Alive	(1) Hotel Clerk (2) James Hendricks (3) Craig the Bartender (4) Link Damon	(1) S1:E10, "Till Death Do Us Part" (1958) (2) Season 1 Episode 23: "Call Your Shot" (1959) (3) Season 1 Episode 34: "Littlest Client" (1959) (4) Season 2 Episode 15: "Chain Gang" (1959)
1958–1959	Steve Canyon	Major Karl Richmond	(1) Season 1 Episode 11: "Operation Crash Landing" (1958) (2) Season 1 Episode 29: "The Trap" (1959) (3) S1:E30, "The Korean Story" (1959)
1959	Maverick	Carl	S2:E26, "The Strange Journey of Jenny Hill"
1959	Peter Gunn	Vice President	Season 1 Episode 28: "Pay Now, Kill Later"
1959	The Donna Reed Show	Bert Rose	Season 2 Episode 10: "All Mothers Worry"
1959–1960	Johnny Ringo	(1) Bogan (2) Tom Ferris	(1) Season 1 Episode 3: "The Accused" (1959) (2) S1:E35, "Killer, Choose a Card" (1960)
1959–1961	The Rifleman	(1) Fogarty (2) Marshall Truce (3) Joe Lovering	(1) Season 1 Episode 40: "The Mind Reader" (1959) (2) Season 3 Episode 5: "Strange Town" (1960) (3) S3:E27, "Short Rope for a Tall Man" (1961)
1959–1962	The Many Loves of Dobie Gillis	Leander Pomfritt	24 episodes
1959–1963	Rawhide	(1) Salesman (2) Lieutenant Hill (3) Lieutenant Carter	(1) Season 1 Episode 3: "Incident with an Executioner" (1959) (2) S3:E18, "Incident of the Running Iron" (1961) (3) S5:E28, "Incident of White Eyes" (1963)
1960	Lawman	Reed Smith	Season 2 Episode 23: "Reunion in Laramie"
1960	The DuPont Show with June Allyson	Lieutenant Barnes	Season 1 Episode 27: "Slip of the Tongue"
1960	Johnny Midnight	Richard Bissell	Season 1 Episode 20: "Registered Mail"
1960	The Twilight Zone	Policeman	Season 1 Episode 33: "Mr. Bevis"
1960	Sea Hunt	Ken Madison	Season 3 Episode 34: "Underwater Narcotics"
1960	Dante	Louis Hastings	Season 1 Episode 10: "The Jolly Roger Cocktail"
1960	Bat Masterson	(1) Harold Dunsmore (2) George Winston	(1) Season 2 Episode 18: "Deadly Diamonds" (2) S3:E13, "The Lady Plays Her Hand"
1960	U.S. Marshal	Charles P. Cahill	Season 2 Episode 24: "Paper Bullets"
1961	Coronado 9	Alfred Bates	Season 1 Episode 34: "The Anxious Mariner"
1961	The Andy Griffith Show	Sam Becker	Season 1 Episode 29: "Quiet Sam"
1961	The Rebel	Charles Ashbaugh	Season 2 Episode 35: "Mission: Varina"
1961–1962	Hennesey	(1) Wally Shafer, Jr. (2) Conrad Musk	(1) Season 2 Episode 25: "Admiral and Son" (1961) (2) S3:E16, "Harvey and the Ring" (1962)
1962	Alfred Hitchcock Presents	Lieutenant Gunderson	Season 7 Episode 14: "Bad Actor"
1962	Lassie	Ranger Barry Weldon	Season 8 Episode 33: "Sanctuary"
1962	The Dick Van Dyke Show	Reverend Kirk	Season 1 Episode 20: "A Word a Day"
1962	Bonanza	George Norton	Season 3 Episode 26: "Look to the Stars"
1963	Hazel	Kemper	Season 2 Episode 22: "Hazel's Day Off"
1963	Empire	Sully Mason	Season 1 Episode 28: "Nobody Dies on Saturday"
1963	The Lucy Show	Mr. Cresant	(1) S1:E28, "Lucy and the Little League" (2) S2:E3, "Lucy and Viv Play Softball"
1963–1966	The Patty Duke Show	Martin Lane, Kenneth Lane, Jed Lane	Main cast (104 episodes)
1966	The Virginian	Harry Foley	Season 5 Episode 9: "Dead-Eye Dick"
1966	Combat!	Major Fisher	Season 5 Episode 8: "Headcount"
1967	The Rat Patrol	Dr. Schneidermann	S1:E26, "The Bring 'Em Back Alive Raid"
1967	Mission: Impossible	Harrison Selby	Season 1 Episode 24: "The Train"
1967	Star Trek: The Original Series	Nilz Baris	S2:E15, "The Trouble with Tribbles"
1967–1969	The Wild Wild West	(1) Silas Grigsby (2) Rufus Krause (3) and (4) Frank Harper	(1) S3:E1, "The Night of the Bubbling Death" (1967) (2) Season 4 Episode 5: "The Night of the Gruesome Games" (1968) (3) Season 4 Episode 15: "The Night of the Winged Terror: Part I" (1969) (4) Season 4 Episode 16: "The Night of the Winged Terror: Part II" (1969)
1967–1970	Get Smart	(1) (2) (3) (4) Admiral Hargrade (5) Earl Kibee	(1) S2:E29, "A Man Called Smart: Part 2" (1967) (2) S2:E30, "A Man Called Smart: Part 3" (1967) (3) Season 4 Episode 8: "The Return of the Ancient Mariner" (1968) (4) S4:E9, "With Love and Twitches" (1968) (5) S5:E19, "Witness for the Execution" (1970)
1968–1969	Here Come the Brides	(1) Reverend Gaddings (2) Shagrue	(1) S1:E4, "The Man of the Family" (1968) (2) S2:E1, "Far Cry from Yesterday" (1969)
1969	The Mod Squad	Bob Hughes	Season 1 Episode 23: "Keep the Faith, Baby"
1969	Bewitched	Dr. Anton	S6:E4, "Samantha's Curious Cravings"
1969	Room 222	Charles Garrett	Season 1 Episode 10: "Fathers and Sons"
1969	Land of the Giants	Dr. Arno	Season 2 Episode 11: "The Clones"
1969–1970	Hawaii Five-O	(1) and (2) Defense Counsel Herbert (3) Craig Wilkie	(1) S1:E19, "Once Upon a Time: Part 1" (1969) (2) S1:E20, "Once Upon a Time: Part 2" (1969) (3) Season 3 Episode 14: "The Double Wall" (1970)
1971	The Partridge Family	Red Woodloe	Season 1 Episode 14: "The Red Woodloe Story"
1973	Kung Fu	Willis Roper	Season 1 Episode 9: "The Praying Mantis Kills"
1973	The Girl with Something Extra	Mr. Everett	Season 1 Episode 8: "No Benefit of Doubt"
1973	Hijack	Frank Kleiner	ABC Movie of the Week
1973	Love, American Style	(1) Steve (2) Louis	(1) Season 4 Episode 20 (Segment: "Love and the Favorite Family") (2) Season 5 Episode 13 (Segment: "Love and Carmen Lopez")
1974	The Six Million Dollar Man	Lorin Sandusky	Season 1 Episode 7: "Eyewitness to Murder"
1974	Barnaby Jones	Mr. Freels	Season 3 Episode 2: "Dead Man's Run"
1974	Death Sentence	Tanner	ABC Movie of the Week
1976	The Bionic Woman	Bill Elgin	Season 1 Episode 5: "Claws"
1976	Dawn: Portrait of a Teenage Runaway	Harry	Television film
1976–1979	Little House on the Prairie	(1) Snell (2) Dean Russell Harmon	(1) Season 2 Episode 20: "Centennial" (1976) (2) S6:E6, "The Preacher Takes a Wife" (1979)
1977	Tail Gunner Joe	General Zwicker	Television film
1977–1978	The Hardy Boys/Nancy Drew Mysteries	Carson Drew	(1) S1:E2, "The Mystery of Pirate's Cove" (1977) (2) Season 1 Episode 4: "The Mystery of the Diamond Triangle" (1977) (3) Season 1 Episode 6: "The Secret of the Whispering Walls" (1977) (4) S1:E8, "A Haunting We Will Go" (1977) (5) S1:E10, "Mystery of the Fallen Angels" (6) Season 1 Episode 12: "The Mystery of the Ghostwriter's Cruise" (1977) (7) Season 1 Episode 14: "Mystery of the Solid Gold Kicker" (1977) (8) S2:E10, "Nancy Drew's Love Match" (1977) (9) S2:E12, "Will the Real Santa Claus...?" (1977) (10) S2:E13, "The Lady on Thursday at Ten" (1978) (11) S2:E21, "Arson and Old Lace" (1978)
1978	One Day at a Time	Mr. Morton	Season 3 Episode 24: "Ann, the Father"
1978	Little Women	Jonathan March	(1) Season 1 Episode 1: "Part I" (2) Season 1 Episode 2: "Part II"
1979	Archie Bunker's Place	Dr. Wakeford	Season 1 Episode 3: "Edith Gets Hired"
1979	Blind Ambition	Herbert Kalmbach	(1) Season 1 Episode 1: "Part I" (2) Season 1 Episode 2: "Part II" (3) Season 1 Episode 3: "Part III" (4) Season 1 Episode 4: "Part IV"
1979	Legends of the Superheroes	Scarlet Cyclone	(1) Season 1 Episode 1: "The Challenge" (2) Season 1 Episode 2: "The Roast"
1979–1982	Lou Grant	(1) Mark Worth (2) Frank Obler	(1) Season 3 Episode 2: "Exposè" (1979) (2) Season 5 Episode 17: "Blacklist" (1982)
1980–1981	The Waltons	Stanley Perkins	(1) S8:E21, "The Travelling Man" (1980) (2) Season 9 Episode 13: "The Gold Watch" (1981) (3) Season 9 Episode 17: "The Threshold" (1981) (4) Season 9 Episode 19: "The Heartache" (1981)
1983	Magnum, P.I.	Bob	Season 3 Episode 14: "Basket Case"
1986	North and South	Robert E. Lee	(1) Season 1 Episode 1: "June 1861 - July 21, 1861" (2) Season 1 Episode 6: "March 1865 - April 1865"
1986–1988	The New Gidget	Russ Lawrence	Main cast (44 episodes)
1987	Highway to Heaven	Grandpa Raines	(1) Season 4 Episode 1: "Man's Best Friend: Part 1" (2) Season 4 Episode 2: "Man's Best Friend: Part 2"
1987	Matlock	Elliot Franklin	Season 2 Episode 11: "The Gift"
1988–1989	War and Remembrance	Harry Hopkins	9 episodes
1989	Midnight Caller	Paul Drude	Season 1 Episode 15: "Baby Chase"
1989	Quantum Leap	Judge Eugene Haller	S2:E9, "So Help Me God - July 29, 1957"
1990	Murphy Brown	Ken Hamilton	Season 2 Episode 18: "The Murphy Brown School of Broadcasting"
1990	In the Heat of the Night	Carl Tibbetts	Season 4 Episode 10: "A Final Arrangement"
1991–1992	The Torkelsons	Wesley Hodges	20 episodes
1992	Dinosaurs	WESAYSO Scientist (voice)	Season 2 Episode 15: "Power Erupts"
1993	Star Trek: Deep Space Nine	Varani	Season 2 Episode 10: "Sanctuary"
1994	Coach	Bert Wilkins	(1) Season 6 Episode 14: "Coach for a Day: Part 1" (2) Season 6 Episode 15: "Coach for a Day: Part 2"
1994	Shake, Rattle and Rock!	Judge Boone	Television film
1998	Jumanji	Dr. Cahill (voice)	Season 2 Episode 13: "The Plague"
1998	The Angry Beavers	Dr. Cowtiki (voice)	Season 2 Episode 10: "The Day the World Got Really Screwed Up"
2002	The Zeta Project	Judge Linden (voice)	Season 2 Episode 12: "The River Rising"
2006	My Name Is Earl	Dr. Rudin	Season 2 Episode 10: "South of the Border"
2007	How I Met Your Mother	Brady	Season 2 Episode 13: "Columns"
2008	The Suite Life of Zack & Cody	David	Season 3 Episode 18: "Romancing the Phone"
2009	Desperate Housewives	Ken	(1) S5:E17, "The Story of Lucy and Jessie" (2) S5:E18, "A Spark. To Pierce the Dark"
2009	According to Jim	Ed	Season 8 Episode 17: "Diamonds Are a Ghoul's Best Friend"
2010	The Deep End	Hal Douglas	Season 1 Episode 1: "Pilot"
2011	Bag of Bones	Max Devore	(1) Season 1 Episode 1: "Part 1" (2) Season 1 Episode 2: "Part 2"
2014	2 Broke Girls	Elevator Operator	Season 3 Episode 20: "And the Not Broke Parents" (uncredited)

=== Video games ===
- The Bard's Tale (2004) - Additional voices
