= The Man from Planet X =

1951 American science fiction film directed by Edgar George Ulmer

- Theatrical release poster
- Directed by: Edgar G. Ulmer
- Written by: Aubrey Wisberg; Jack Pollexfen
- Produced by: Jack Pollexfen; Aubrey Wisberg
- Starring: Robert Clarke; Margaret Field; William Schallert
- Cinematography: John L. Russell
- Edited by: Fred R. Feitshans Jr.
- Music by: Charles Koff
- Distributed by: United Artists
- Release dates: March 9, 1951 (San Francisco); April 7, 1951 (New York City); April 27, 1951 (U.S.)
- Running time: 70 minutes
- Country: United States
- Language: English
- Budget: $51,000 (est.)
- Box office: $1.2 million

The Man from Planet X is a 1951 independently made American black-and-white science fiction horror film, produced by Jack Pollexfen and Aubrey Wisberg, directed by Edgar G. Ulmer, that stars Robert Clarke, Margaret Field, and William Schallert. The film was distributed by United Artists.

The story concerns a humanoid who lands on Earth in a spaceship from a mysterious planet and makes contact with a small group of humans on an isolated, fog-shrouded Scottish moor.

== Plot ==
A spaceship from a previously unknown planet lands in the Scottish moorlands, bringing a humanoid alien to Earth near the observatory of Professor Elliot. When the professor and his friend, American reporter John Lawrence, discover the spaceman, they help and try to communicate with it, failing in their attempt. They leave, and the alien follows them. A colleague of the professor, the unscrupulous and ambitious scientist Dr. Mears, discovers that the humanoid speaks in musical tones and tries to force from it the metal formula for its spaceship. He shuts off its breathing apparatus and leaves the spaceman for dead, telling the professor that communication was hopeless.

Soon, Lawrence discovers that the alien is gone, as is the professor's daughter, Enid. Tommy, the seaside village constable, reports that others are now missing as well. Lawrence takes the constable to the site where the spaceship had landed, but it is no longer there. With more villagers now missing, including Mears, and the phone lines suddenly dead the village is in panic. They are finally able to get word to Scotland Yard by using a heliograph to contact a passing freighter just off the coast.

When an Inspector and a sergeant fly in and are briefed on the situation, it is decided that the military must destroy the spaceship. Lawrence objects that doing so will also kill the people who are now under the alien's control. With the planet due to reach its closest approach to Earth at midnight, Lawrence is given until 11:00 p.m. to rescue them. He sneaks up to the alien ship and learns from Mears that the spaceman intends to use its ship as a wireless relay station in advance of an invasion coming from the approaching planet, which is a dying world. Lawrence orders the villagers to leave and attacks the alien, shutting off its breathing apparatus, then escapes with Enid and the professor. Mears, however, returns to the spaceship and is killed when the military opens fire and destroys it. No invasion happens and the mysterious Planet X slowly exits the Solar System for deep space.

== Cast ==
- Robert Clarke as John Lawrence
- Margaret Field as Enid Elliot
- Raymond Bond as Professor Elliot
- William Schallert as Dr. Mears
- Roy Engel as Tommy the Constable
- Charles Davis as Georgie, man at dock
- Gilbert Fallman as Dr. Robert Blane
- David Ormont as Inspector Porter
- June Jeffery as Wife of missing man
- Franklyn Farnum as Sgt. Ferris, Porter's assistant (uncredited)

Cast notes

- Actor Pat Goldin and dwarf actor Billy Curtis were both rumoured to be the unknown actor who played the role of the alien space visitor. However, Robert Clarke, who is frequently named as the source of the Pat Goldin rumour, never actually knew the name of the actor who played the alien, nor did the other cast members, including Margaret Field and William Schallert. Furthermore, the unknown actor was noticeably taller than Billy Curtis. Cast member Robert Clarke recalls only that he was of Jewish origin, stood about five feet tall, and was once part of an acrobatic vaudeville act. Margaret Field and producer Jack Pollexfen later recalled only that he had complained about his uncomfortable costume and his low pay, while William Schallert remembered him only as a very small, interesting-looking middle-aged man who wasn't much of an actor. Robert Clarke was paid $350/week for his work on this film.

== Production ==
The film went into production on December 13, 1950, at Hal Roach Studios in Culver City, California, and wrapped principal photography six days later. In order to save money, the film was shot on sets for the 1948 Ingrid Bergman film Joan of Arc, using artificial fog to change moods, plot locations, and to hide the lack of backdrops and staged landscapes for the outdoor scenes.

== In popular culture ==
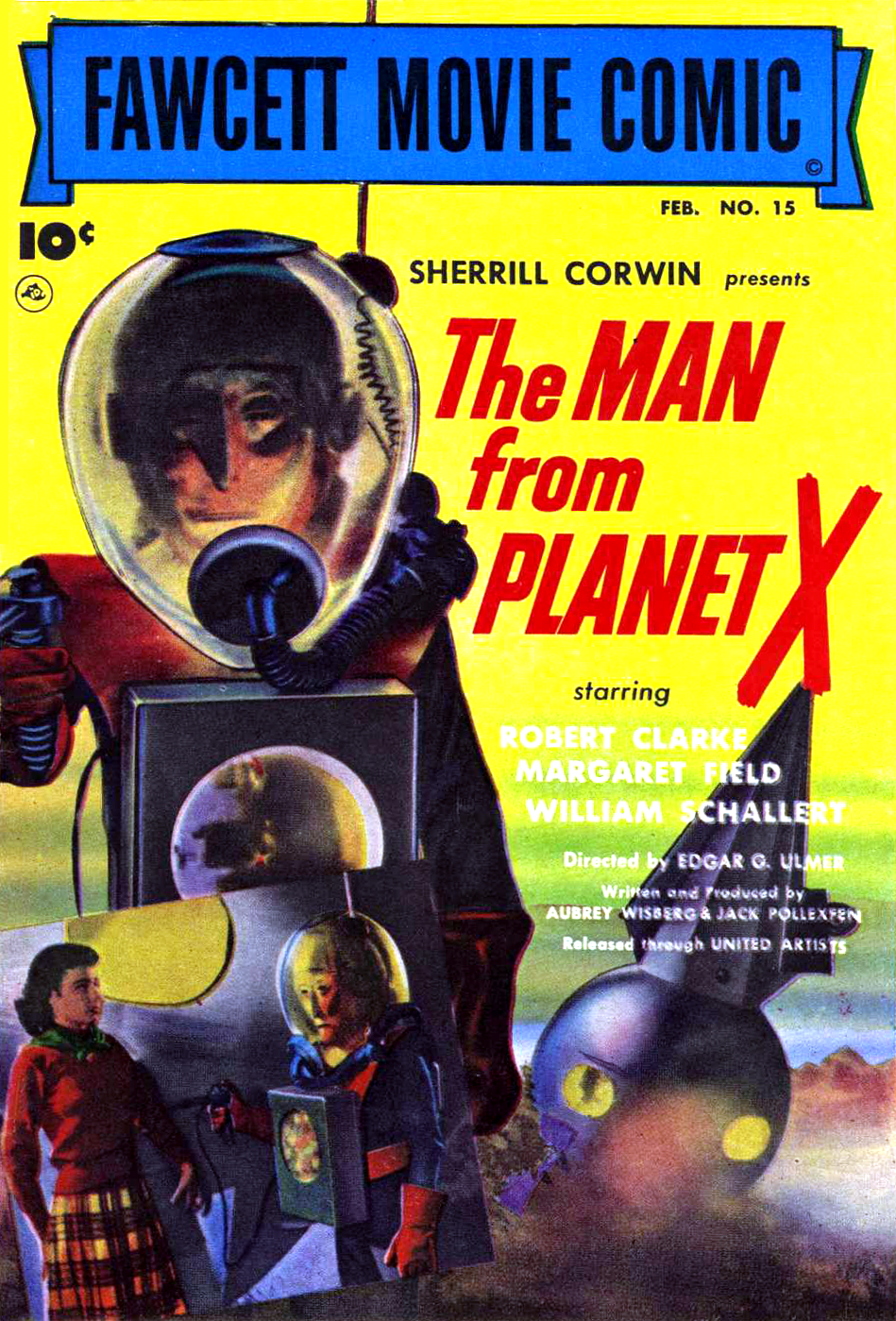
1952 comic book adaptation.

- The alien can communicate using only modulated musical sounds, a concept later used in 1977 in Steven Spielberg's film Close Encounters of the Third Kind.
- The alien appears alongside other film monsters in the 2003 film Looney Tunes: Back in Action, in the scene that occurs at Area 52.
- Clips from the film are shown during a movie theater sequence set in 1951 in the fourth episode of 2015's second season of the FX anthology series Fargo.
