= Ghost Town (1956 film) =

1956 movie

- Theatrical release poster
- Directed by: Allen H. Miner
- Written by: Jameson Brewer
- Produced by: Howard W. Koch
- Starring: Kent Taylor; John Smith; Marian Carr; Serena Sande; John Doucette
- Cinematography: Joseph F. Biroc
- Edited by: Michael Pozen
- Music by: Paul Dunlap
- Production company: Bel-Air Productions
- Distributed by: United Artists
- Release date: March 1956
- Running time: 77 minutes
- Country: United States
- Language: English
- Budget: $100,000

Ghost Town is a 1956 American Western film directed by Allen H. Miner and written by Jameson Brewer. The film stars Kent Taylor, John Smith, Marian Carr, Serena Sande and John Doucette. The film was released in March 1956 by United Artists.

== Plot ==
Four passengers in a stagecoach, belonging to the Missouri Western Stage and Freight Line, are heading west through Indian territory: Barbara, a young woman going to meet her fiancée; Reverend Wheedle, a minister who believes the settlers should make friends with the Indians; Doc, a drunken doctor; and Conroy, a well-dressed "gentleman" with a sly and cynical tone.

On reaching the Rimrock stage stop, they discover that it has been destroyed by Indians, they are joined by Duff, the woman's fiancé and his friend Crusty; who have been prospecting for gold for the last two years. They continue on, then encounter Sergeant Dockery, a soldier from a nearby fort, Fort Kildare; and Alex, his son. The soldier tells the group that the Cheyenne and Arapaho are on the warpath and they have to change course. The group is then attacked by a band of Indians and the two stagecoach drivers are killed, the doctor is also killed. The rest of the group manages to reach Pipestone, a ghost town (apparently wiped out by a disease), where they hold up for the night in the abandoned saloon. They are joined there by Fire Knife, an old Cheyenne chief who is disgraced in the eyes of his tribe and has been punished by elinguation, and Maureen, Fire Knife's half-white daughter.

The Indians attack and the group is able to hold them off, but they run out of ammunition. The minister tries to talk to the Indians, but the naive fool is killed. Alex sneaks off in the night to try and get help, but is also seemingly killed. The next day, Stone Knife, the leader of Cheyenne, offers the group a bargain – turn over Fire Knife, and the rest will be allowed to go free. Duff, who has become the leader of the group, does not want to do it, but Fire Knife sneaks out a back door and gives himself up, allowing the group to leave, Conroy and Barbara proceed onboard the Stagecoach to Fort Kildare, escorted by Sergeant Dockery, while Duff, Crusty and Maureen remain behind in Pipestone.

== Cast ==
- Kent Taylor as Conroy
- John Smith as Duff
- William 'Bill' Phillips as Kerry 'Crusty' McCabe (uncredited)
- Marian Carr as Barbara
- Serena Sande as Maureen
- John Doucette as Doc
- Joel Ashley as Sergeant Dockery
- Gilman Rankin as Reverend Wheedle
- Gary Murray as Alex Dockery
- Edmund Hashim as Stone Knife
- Chief Ted Nez as Fire Knife

== Production ==
Parts of the film were shot in Johnson Canyon and the Kanab movie fort in Utah.
