= Marjorie Eaton =

American actress and artist (1901–1986)

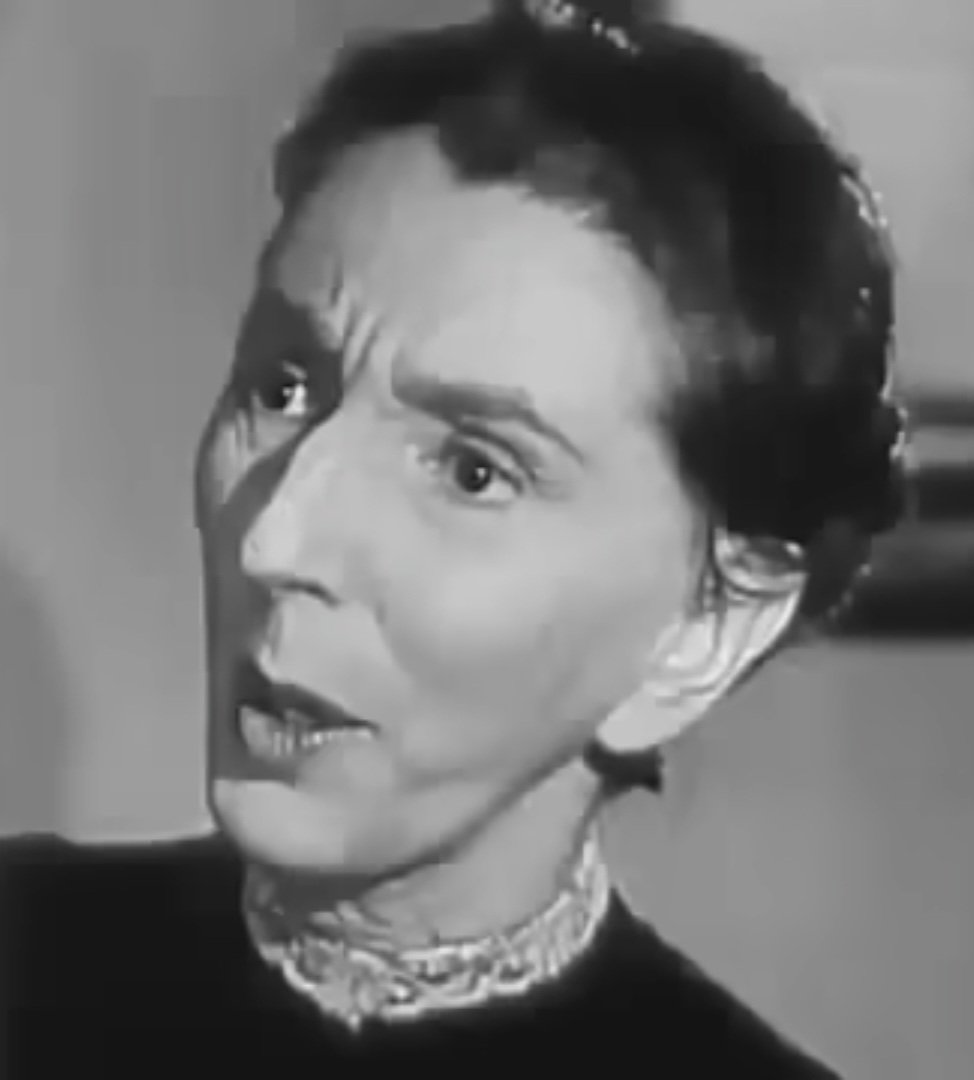
- Eaton in an episode of One Step Beyond (1959)
- Born: Marjorie Lee Eaton; February 5, 1901; Oakland, California, U.S.
- Died: April 21, 1986 (aged 85); Palo Alto, California, U.S.
- Education: The Art Institute of Boston; Art Students League of New York, San Francisco School of Fine Arts
- Occupations: Painter, photographer, actress
- Known for: Painting, Architecture, Acting
- Notable work: "Taos Ceremony", "Taos Man Seated", "Man in Cloak"
- Movement: Modernism, Cubism

Marjorie Lee Eaton (February 5, 1901 – April 21, 1986) was an American painter, photographer and character actress.

== Biography ==
Marjorie Lee Eaton was born on February 5, 1901 in Oakland, California, and raised in Palo Alto. She attended the Katherine Delmar Burke School and graduated in 1920. She studied at The Art Institute of Boston, in Florence, Italy and in Paris.

Eaton's most famous painting, "Taos Ceremony", circa 1928–1932

In 1925, Eaton's stepmother, Edith Cox Eaton, purchased the historic Palo Alto house of Juana Briones de Miranda and it became a celebrated art colony and family home up until 2011, when it was demolished. Artist Lucretia Van Horn and sculptor Louise Nevelson spent significant periods of time there, as did Marjorie. In 1939, Marjorie designed and built her own adobe near the Briones house working closely with renowned architect Gregory Ain. Marjorie Eaton had taken painting classes with Hans Hofmann at the Art Students League of New York and afterwards shared a studio with Louise Nevelson whom she met at the League. Marjorie and Louise lived downstairs from Diego Rivera and Frida Kahlo and the four became close friends and fellow artists.

Though trained in the Stanislavsky method of acting, Marjorie Eaton's initial career choice was to work as either an architect or commercial artist. Before acting, she had joined the art colony in Taos, New Mexico from 1928 to 1932 and Mexico from 1933 to 1935, where she lived with and worked with Diego Rivera on locations in northern Mexico. She gained "a reputation for modernist figural work with bold lines, strong color, and Cubist influenced." Her painting "Taos Ceremony" was exhibited in December 2008 as part of a retrospective exhibit "Colorado and the Old West", which showcased 19th and 20th century artworks related to Colorado and New Mexico. However, she found it impossible to make a living as a woman artist, so she gave up painting entirely and turned to acting.

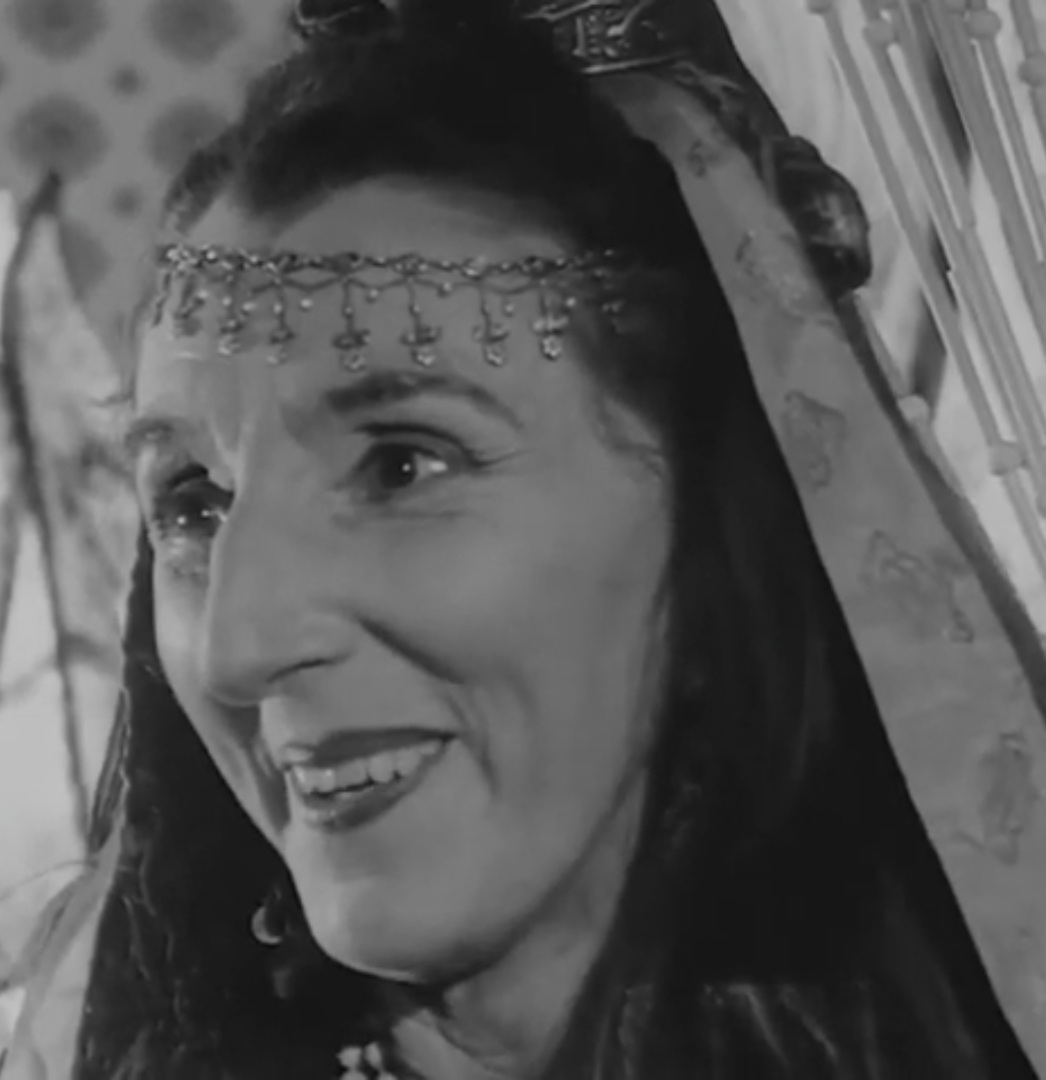
Eaton in Night Tide (1961)

Eaton appeared both in film and on stage, performing in a number of Broadway plays. She made her (uncredited) film debut in Anna and the King of Siam in 1946. Later roles included Hester Forstye in That Forsyte Woman (1949), Madame Romanovitch in Night Tide (1961), the starring role of Hetty March in the low-budget, science fiction B movie Monstrosity (1963), Miss Persimmon in Mary Poppins (1964), and Sister Ursula in The Trouble with Angels (1966).

In 1979, aged 78, Eaton filmed a scene for the second Star Wars film, The Empire Strikes Back, in which she portrayed the role of Emperor Palpatine, under heavy makeup. She was one of two actresses that shot the scene with the makeup, the other being Elaine Baker (wife of makeup artist Rick Baker). The final character had superimposed chimpanzee eyes and was voiced by Clive Revill. Neither woman received on-screen credit, and sources disagree about which actress appears in the final film. When the film was released on DVD in 2004, the scene was re-shot with Ian McDiarmid, who played Emperor Palpatine in all of the other films in which the character appears.

In March 1986, Eaton suffered a stroke. On April 21, 1986, she died at her childhood home in Palo Alto surrounded by two nieces and a nephew by marriage. After the memorial services, her cremated ashes were scattered in two places: half over the property where she grew up and half in Taos where she spent years as an artist.

== Filmography ==
=== Film ===
- Anna and the King of Siam (1946) as Miss MacFarlane (uncredited)
- The Time of Their Lives (1946) as Bessie (uncredited)
- Mourning Becomes Electra (1947) as Woman at home
- A Woman's Vengeance (1948) as Maid (uncredited)
- The Snake Pit (1948) as Patient (uncredited)
- That Forsyte Woman (1949) as Hester Forsyte
- The Story of Seabiscuit (1949) as Miss Newsome (uncredited)
- The Vicious Years (1950) as Zia Lola
- Hollywood Story (1951) as Weird-Looking Woman (uncredited)
- Rose of Cimarron (1952) as Townswoman (uncredited)
- Hold That Line (1952) as Miss Whitsett (uncredited)
- Zombies of Mora Tau (1957) as Grandmother Peters
- Witness for the Prosecution (1957) as Miss O'Brien (uncredited)
- Night Tide (1961) as Madame Romanovitch
- The Three Stooges in Orbit (1962) as Mrs. McGinnis (uncredited)
- Monstrosity aka The Atomic Brain (1963) as Hetty March
- Mary Poppins (1964) as Miss Persimmon
- The Trouble with Angels (1966) as Sister Ursula
- Yours, Mine and Ours (1968) as Housekeeper #3
- Bullitt (1968) as Mrs. Larkin (uncredited)
- Hail, Hero! (1969) as Carl's Aunt
- Harold and Maude (1971) as Madame Arouet (uncredited)
- Hammersmith Is Out (1972) as Princess
- The Killing Kind (1973) as Mrs. Orland
- The Reincarnation of Peter Proud (1975) as Astrology Lady
- Cardiac Arrest (1980) as Mrs. Swan
- The Attic (1980) as Mrs. Fowler
- The Empire Strikes Back (1980) as
  The Emperor (voiced by Clive Revill) (uncredited)
- Street Music (1981) as Mildred
- Crackers (1984) as Mrs. O'Malley (final film role)

=== Television ===
- The Lone Ranger (1950) (Season 1 Episode 30: "Never Say Die") as Essie Newton
- Hallmark Hall of Fame (1953) (1 episode)
- Studio One in Hollywood (1954) (Season 6 Episode 52: "The Cliff") as Martha
- Robert Montgomery Presents (1952-1955) (3 episodes)
  - (Season 3 Episode 32: "Penny") (1952)
  - (Season 3 Episode 39: "Mr. Dobie Takes a Powder") (1952)
  - (Season 6 Episode 32: "Bella Fleace Gave a Party") (1955)
- The Adventures of Jim Bowie (1957) (Season 2 Episode 7: "A Fortune for Madame") as Madame Beaubrun
- The Loretta Young Show (1959) (Season 6 Episode 17: "Incident in India") as Sara
- Alcoa Presents: One Step Beyond (1959) (Season 1 Episode 2: "Night of April 14th") as Miss Parsons
- My Three Sons (1960-1961) (2 episodes) as Cynthia Pitts
  - (Season 1 Episode 2: "The Little Ragpicker") (1960)
  - (Season 1 Episode 29: "The Wiley Method") (1961)
- Alfred Hitchcock Presents (1962) (Season 7 Episode 16: "The Case of M.J.H.") as Landlady
- Bob Hope Presents the Chrysler Theatre (1963) (Season 1 Episode 7: "The Fifth Passenger") as Old Woman
- Mr. Terrific (1967) (Season 1 Episode 4: "My Partner the Jewel Thief") as Princess
- Then Came Bronson (1969) (Season 1 Episode 15: "Sibyl") as Madame Vanya
- The F.B.I. (1970) (Season 6 Episode 5: "The Savage Wilderness") as Mrs. Elbert
- The Streets of San Francisco (1973) (Season 2 Episode 3: "For the Love of God") as Churchgoer
- The Waltons (1973) (Season 2 Episode 9: "The Fawn") as Mrs. Crofut

== Theatre ==
Eaton's Broadway credits include Merchant of Venice, Bell, Book and Candle in 1950, In the Summer House in 1953, and One Eye Closer in 1954.
