= Captain Kidd and the Slave Girl =

1954 film by Lew Landers

- Theatrical release poster
- Directed by: Lew Landers
- Written by: Jack Pollexfen; Aubrey Wisberg
- Produced by: Jack Pollexfen; Aubrey Wisberg; Edward Small
- Starring: Anthony Dexter; Eva Gabor; Alan Hale Jr. James Seay; Richard Karlan
- Cinematography: Charles Van Enger
- Edited by: Fred R. Feitshans Jr.
- Music by: Nelson Riddle
- Production companies: Superior Pictures; World Films
- Distributed by: United Artists
- Release date: May 20, 1954
- Running time: 82 minutes
- Country: United States
- Language: English

Captain Kidd and the Slave Girl is a 1954 American swashbuckler adventure film directed by Lew Landers and starring Anthony Dexter, Eva Gabor, and Alan Hale Jr. It was distributed by United Artists. A woman who disguises herself as a slave girl in order to try to gain information from Captain Kidd about his hidden treasure.

== Plot ==
A nobleman rescues Captain Kidd from the gallows in order to find his treasure.

== Cast ==
- Anthony Dexter as Captain William Kidd
- Eva Gabor as Judith Duvall
- Alan Hale Jr. as Jerry Simpson
- James Seay as Earl of Bellomont
- William Tannen as Steve Castle
- Sonia Sorrell as Anne Bonny
- Noel Cravat as L'ollonaise
- Richard Karlan as Henry Every
- Lyle Talbot as Pace
- Mike Ross as Blackbeard
- Jack Reitzen as Captain Bartholomew
- Robert Long as John Rackham
