= San Quentin (1946 film) =

1946 drama film directed by Gordon Douglas

- Directed by: Gordon Douglas
- Written by: Arthur A. Ross; Lawrence Kimble; Arthur A. Ross; Howard J. Green
- Produced by: Martin Mooney
- Starring: Lawrence Tierney; Barton MacLane; Marian Carr
- Cinematography: Frank Redman
- Edited by: Marvin Coil
- Music by: Paul Sawtell
- Distributed by: RKO Radio Pictures
- Release dates: December 8, 1946 (Premiere-Boston); December 17, 1946 (U.S.)
- Running time: 66 minutes
- Country: United States
- Language: English

San Quentin is a 1946 American romantic drama film directed by Gordon Douglas and starring Lawrence Tierney, Barton MacLane and Marian Carr.

== Plot ==
The warden of San Quentin State Prison takes three of his best-behaved model prisoners to a press event in San Francisco, but Nick Taylor escapes en route. The warden enlists an old enemy of Taylor's, Jim Roland, to bring him back to justice. The film comes with a prologue with former Sing Sing warden Lewis E. Lawes advocating the inmates' Mutual Welfare League.

== Cast ==
- Lawrence Tierney as Jim Roland
- Barton MacLane as Nick Taylor
- Marian Carr as Betty Richards
- Harry Shannon as Warden Kelly
- Carol Forman as Ruthie
- Joe Devlin as 'Broadway' Johnson
- Tom Keene as Hal Schaeffer
- Tony Barrett as Steve Marlowe
- Lee Bonnell as Joe Carzoni
- Robert Clarke as Tommy North
- Raymond Burr as Jeff Torrance
- unbilled players include: Byron Foulger, Selmer Jackson and Herbert Rawlinson
