= Vy Russell =

American screenwriter

- Born: Violet Catherine Donnelly; August 9, 1915; Galveston, Texas, USA
- Died: January 5, 1998 (aged 82); Los Angeles, California, USA
- Occupations: Screenwriter, TV writer, producer
- Spouse: John L. Russell

Vy Russell (born Violet Donnelly, 9 August 1915 – 5 January 1998) was an American screenwriter, producer, and TV writer who worked primarily in the science-fiction genre during the 1950s and 1960s. A native Texan, she was married to cinematographer John L. Russell of Wisberg-Pollexfen Productions.

== Selected filmography ==
- Monstrosity (1963)
- Indestructible Man (1956)
- The Gene Autry Show (TV) (1951; one episode)
