= Sue Dwiggins =

American writer and production assistant

- Born: Miriam Gretchen Sues; April 20, 1914; Los Angeles, California
- Died: December 31, 2011; Studio City, California, USA

Sue Dwiggins Worsley (born Miriam Gretchen Sues; 1914–2011) was an American writer and production assistant on many films and also TV shows. She also worked on the memoir of her husband, film director Wallace Worsley Jr. She worked largely in science fiction and horror genres, but also did production secretary work for Deliverance.

== Selected filmography ==
- Monstrosity (1963)
- Indestructible Man (1956)
