= Monstrosity (film) =

1963 film by Jack Pollexfen

- Promotional film poster
- Directed by: Joseph V. Mascelli
- Written by: Sue Bradford; Dean Dillman Jr.; Jack Pollexfen; Vy Russell
- Produced by: Dean Dillman Jr.; Jack Pollexfen
- Starring: Marjorie Eaton; Frank Gerstle; Frank Fowler
- Narrated by: Bradford Dillman
- Cinematography: Alfred Taylor
- Edited by: Owen C. Gladden
- Music by: Gene Kauer
- Distributed by: Emerson Film Enterprises
- Release date: September 1963
- Running time: 64 minutes
- Country: United States
- Language: English

Monstrosity is a 1963 American science fiction horror film produced by Jack Pollexfen and Dean Dillman Jr. and directed by Joseph V. Mascelli. The film stars Marjorie Eaton, Frank Gerstle, Erika Peters, and Xerxes the cat. It tells the story of a wealthy elderly woman who wants to have her brain transplanted into the head of a young woman. Actor Bradford Dillman, the younger brother of co-writer and producer Dean Dillman, Jr., narrated the film.

Monstrosity was broadcast on television under the title The Atomic Brain.

== Plot ==
In an atomic-powered laboratory beneath the mansion of the elderly, mean, and wealthy Mrs. Hettie March, Dr. Otto Frank is experimenting with brain transplantation. Things are not going very well, though, as all Dr. Frank has succeeded in creating so far is Hans, a snarling man-beast with a dog's brain, and the "Walking Corpse" – a pretty young woman who wanders about the lab with a brain-dead glassy-eyed stare. Dr. Frank's goal is to carry out the wishes of Mrs. March and transplant her brain into the head of a beautiful younger woman.

To that end, Mrs. March advertises for domestic help and hires Nina Rhodes from Austria, Bea Mullins from England, and Anita Gonzales from Mexico. Mrs. March plans to pick out the best-looking of the three and use her as a body donor so that she will become one of the richest and most beautiful young women in the world. She rejects Anita because the birthmark on her back makes her imperfect and chooses the curvaceous blonde Bea instead.

Anita is turned over to Dr. Frank for experimentation, and he transplants the brain of Xerxes the cat into her head. Anita immediately takes on the aspects of cat behavior: purring, hissing, eating mice, etc. Neither Nina nor Bea know what has happened to Anita, and when Bea comes across her, she scratches out one of Bea's eyes. Nina finds Anita on the roof of the mansion and attempts to get her down, but Anita loses her footing and falls to her death.

Because of Bea's injury, Nina becomes by default the choice for Mrs. March's new body. However, Dr. Frank, wanting to take full control of his work, instead transplants Mrs. March's brain into Xerxes. Now a cat, Mrs. March is quite unhappy about this unexpected development, and after scratching Dr. Frank's hand in anger, locks him inside his atomic-powered experimental chamber when he enters it. Xerxes/Mrs. March then starts the chamber, which quickly reduces Dr. Frank to a skeleton, and also begins the chain reaction in the atomic pile below the lab that will cause it to explode, destroying all evidence of the lab and burning the mansion to the ground.

A half-blind Bea stumbles into the lab to rescue Nina. But as the lab starts coming apart, Bea is killed when a piece of machinery falls on her. Nina flees into the night, unaware that following silently behind her is Xerxes/Mrs. March, waiting for a chance to someday, somehow claim Nina's body as her own.

== Cast ==
- Marjorie Eaton as Mrs. Hettie March
- Frank Gerstle as Dr. Otto Frank
- Frank Fowler as Victor
- Erika Peters as Nina Rhodes
- Judy Bamber as Bea Mullins
- Lisa Lang as Anita Gonzalez
- Xerxes as The Cat
- Margie Fisco as the Walking Corpse (uncredited)
- Unnamed Actor as Hans (uncredited)
- Unnamed Actor as the Night Watchman (uncredited)
- Bradford Dillman as the Narrator (uncredited)

== Production ==
In an interview with film historian Tom Weaver, Pollexfen said that Monstrosity "was shot around '58, with fundamentally an amateur cast." It was originally budgeted at $25,000 but ended up with a final cost of "around $40,000," and was the only film he was connected with that never made a profit. Pollexfen said that "Everything went wrong" with the making of the movie. He called it "certainly the worst picture I was ever involved with" and his least favorite of the movies he had worked on.

== Release ==
According to the American Film Institute, Monstrosity was released to theatres in September 1963. However, it was not reviewed by Variety until after a screening at a Hollywood theatre on 9 December 1964, some 15 months after its stated release. And as part of a question that Weaver asked Pollexfen in the interview, Weaver referred to the film as being released "around 1964," approximately six years after it was made in 1958.

=== Home media ===
The film has been released on DVD several times, including as part of "Mill Creek Entertainment's 2007 100 Movie Packs of Sci-Fi Classics and Horror Classics." It was also in The Monster Collection: 16 Movies, a three-disc set from Echo Bridge Home Entertainment, released on 1 September 2015, and again on 13 September 2016 in Echo Bridge's The Midnight Horror Collection: Vol. 3. Willete Acquisition Corporation twice released The Atomic Brain as single discs less than two weeks apart, on 5 and 16 February 2016. A Monstrosity/Teenage Zombies (1959) double feature was offered by Bayview Entertainment/Retromedia as of 26 July 2016. The Atomic Brain was a single-disc DVD issued on 29 June 2017 by Film Detective. A double feature of Monstrosity/The City of the Dead (1960) came from Frolic Pictures on 8 October 2019, and another, The Dead One (1961)/Monstrosity, was issued by Image Entertainment on 30 October 2020.

A 4K restoration of Monstrosity was released on BD-R and DVD-R in 2017 following a successful 2015/2016 Kickstarter campaign by Ben Solovey. It features audio commentary by Tom Weaver, who speaks about the making of the movie, and Dr. Robert J. Kiss, who discusses its theatrical and TV release.

== Reception ==
"Bobb," whose review of the film is in the 16 December 1964 issue of Variety, has little good to say about the movie. He writes that "Monstrosity proves its name is no misnomer" and that it is a "poorly acted, poorly directed and poorly written attempt to shock." In his opinion, "it's difficult to distinguish the zombies from the other actors," and he points out that Nina, Bea, and Anita lose their foreign accents half-way through the film."

More recent reviewers are not more favorably impressed than "Bobb" was. Writing in The Zombie Movie Encyclopedia, academic Peter Dendle calls it a "deservedly infamous horror" which includes the "earliest explicit statement that brain decay accounts for the zombie's diminished intelligence." Here, the Walking Corpse, a "walking, breathing, zombie-like creature" exhibits "only basic motor functions" as she "wanders around the cellar laboratory in her white robe and bare feet with a blank stare."

But as zombies do not figure prominently in the narrative, film historian Glenn Kay categorizes Monstrosity as a "Zombieless Zombie" movie. He calls it "an amusingly ridiculous drive-in effort," a film that is "so bad, it's good."

Film historian Jamie Russell also finds little that makes a favorable impression. He writes that the only monstrosities to be seen are "a woman with a cat's brain, a man with a dog's brain and a zombified chick whose cerebral matter is no longer firing on all cylinders." Similar to Kay, he calls it "trash cinema" but "not without perverse enjoyment."

Critic Mike Bogue writes that "Probably the best thing about the movie is its length, just a little over an hour. While not as howlingly awful like The Beast of Yucca Flats [1961], Monstrosity is still tough sledding. However, the actors are fairly good for this type of movie." He also notes that while "Hans is the titular Monstrosity (...) viewers may feel that the real monstrosity is the film itself."

Elsewhere, special mention is made of "impromptu cat performer" Xerxes, the film's "featured feline." The anonymous reviewer points out that Xerxes, already with Mrs. March's brain, provides the climax of the movie as she/he "takes advantage of Dr. Frank entering his atomic chamber by locking him in and flipping the switch, frying the man alive."

In Zombiemania: 80 Movies to Die For, academic and author Arnold T. Blumberg wrote that the "Mystery Science Theater 3000 version is the only watchable one."

Academic Bonnie Noonan took an in-depth look at Monstrosity in her book Gender in Science Fiction Films 1964-1979: A Critical Study. She notes that both women and men are portrayed in ways that are stereotypically gendered. The film devalues "women of a certain age" in the form of Mrs. March, who wants to replace her unacceptably aging body with a younger one. But the movie "is also critical of men." Victor (Frank Fowler), whom Noonan refers to as Mrs. March's "longtime male companion," is "not depicted as a man worthy of high regard." For example. as Victor ogles the Walking Corpse, "a drooling girl whose dead body has been reanimated," he mutters lecherously, "She doesn't have a brain. Might be advantages."

== Mystery Science Theater 3000 episode ==
Under the title The Atomic Brain, the film was shown in episode #518 of Mystery Science Theater 3000, first airing on 4 December 1993. The episode is not considered to be among the series' high points. It did not make the top 100 in a poll of MST3K Season 11 Kickstarter backers; similarly, writer Jim Vorel, in his ranking of all 191 MST3K episodes, put the episode at #151, calling it "a slice of dull B&W averageness ... [that] feels interchangeable with any of the MANY other 'mad scientist' episodes."

The MST3K version of the film was released by Rhino Home Video as part of the Mystery Science Theater 3000 Collection, Vol. 3 DVD box set. The collection also containsThe Sidehackers (episode #202) and The Unearthly (episode #320) plus a disc of six MST3K shorts. The four-disc collection was later re-issued by Shout Factory in September 2016.

== Musical adaptation ==
The film was adapted into a musical in 2010. The play is described as "perfect for high schools and community theatres," with "several strong female roles," "content suitable for all ages," and "dancing cats!"

== See also ==
- List of films in the public domain in the United States
