= John L. Russell (cinematographer) =

American cinematographer

- Born: John Lowell Russell Jr. May 15, 1905; Brooklyn, New York, U.S.
- Died: July 22, 1967 (aged 62); Los Angeles, California, U.S.
- Occupation: Cinematographer
- Spouse: Vy Russell
- Parent(s): Lillian Case Russell; John Lowell Russell

John Lowell Russell Jr. (May 15, 1905 – July 22, 1967) was an American cinematographer who was known for his work on films like Psycho (for which he earned an Academy Award nomination) as well as his extensive work on TV.

He was credited on more than 80 films and TV shows over the course of his long career in the industry. He was the son of screenwriter Lillian Case Russell and actor John Lowell Russell, and was married to screenwriter Vy Russell.

== Selected filmography ==
- Backtrack! (1969)
- Out of Sight (1966)
- Billie (1965)
- Psycho (1960)
- Hell's Crossroads (1957)
- Star in the Dust (1956)
- Indestructible Man (1956)
- When Gangland Strikes (1956)
- The Vanishing American (1955)
- Headline Hunters (1955)
- Lay That Rifle Down (1955)
- Double Jeopardy (1955)
- The Eternal Sea (1955)
- The Atomic Kid (1954)
- Tobor the Great (1954)
- Make Haste to Live (1954)
- Hell's Half Acre (1954)
- Geraldine (1953)
- Champ for a Day (1953)
- The Beast from 20,000 Fathoms (1953) (as Jack Russell)
- City That Never Sleeps (1953)
- Problem Girls (1953)
- Sword of Venus (1953)
- Invasion U.S.A. (1952)
- Arctic Flight (1952) (as Jack Russell)
- Park Row (1952) (as Jack Russell)
- Government Agents vs. Phantom Legion (1951)
- The Man from Planet X (1951)
- The Golden Gloves Story (1950)
- Guilty of Treason (1950)
- The Green Promise (1949)
- Moonrise (1948)
- Macbeth (1948)
- So This Is New York (1948) (as Jack Russell)
