= Linda, Be Good =

1947 film

- Directed by: Frank McDonald
- Starring: Elyse Knox; Marie Wilson
- Cinematography: George Robinson
- Edited by: Norman A. Cerf
- Music by: Jack Mason
- Production company: Cameo Productions
- Distributed by: Eagle-Lion Films
- Release date: October 18, 1947
- Running time: 67 minutes
- Country: United States
- Language: English

Linda, Be Good is a 1947 American comedy film directed by Frank McDonald and starring Elyse Knox, John Hubbard and Marie Wilson. The film's sets were designed by the art director Lewis H. Creber.

Sidney W. Pink took the film and added some additional footage of a line of burlesque dancers in 3-D and released it under the alternative title I Was a Burlesque Queen in 1953.

== Plot ==
A married woman joins a burlesque troupe to gather research for a novel she is writing without her husband knowing. However this leads to complications when she meets her husband's boss.

== Cast ==
- Elyse Knox as Linda Prentiss
- John Hubbard as Roger Prentiss
- Marie Wilson as Margie LaVitte
- Gordon Richards as Sam Thompson
- Jack Norton as Jim Benson
- Ralph Sanford as Nunnally LaVitte
- Joyce Compton as Mrs. LaVitte
- Frank J. Scannell as Eddie Morgan
- The Cameo Girls as Chorus Line
- Leonard Bremen as Sgt. Hrublchka
- Gerald Oliver Smith as Butler
- Claire Carleton as Myrtle
- Allan Nixon as Officer Jones
- Byron Foulger as Bookshop Owner
- Edward Gargan as Frankie
- Muni Seroff as Maitre d'Hotel
- Mira McKinney as Mrs. Thompson
- Professor Lamberti as Prof. Lamberti
- Sir Lancelot as Calypso Singer
- Marjorie Stapp as Cameo Girl
- Joi Lansing as Cameo Girl

== Bibliography ==
- Michael L. Stephens. Art Directors in Cinema: A Worldwide Biographical Dictionary. McFarland, 1998.
