= Margaret Field =

American actress (1922–2011)

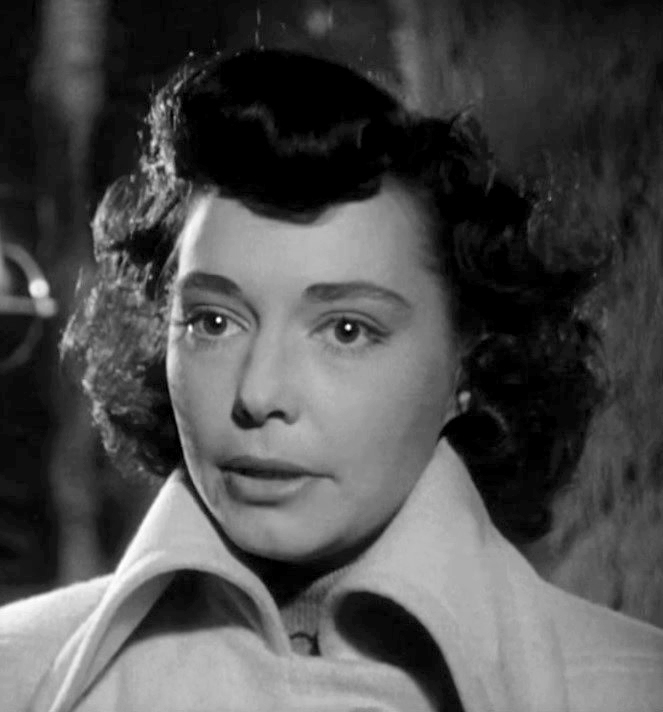
- Field in the trailer for The Man from Planet X (1951)
- Born: Margaret Joy Morlan; May 10, 1922; Houston, Texas, U.S.
- Died: November 6, 2011 (aged 89); Malibu, California, U.S.
- Other name: Maggie Mahoney
- Education: Pasadena Junior College
- Occupation: Actress
- Years active: 1945–1973
- Spouses: Richard Field (m. 1942; div. 1950) Jock Mahoney (m. 1952; div. 1968)
- Children: 3, including Sally and Richard
- Relatives: Peter Craig (grandson); Eli Craig (grandson)

Margaret Field (née Margaret Joy Morlan; May 10, 1922 – November 6, 2011) was an American film actress usually billed as Maggie Mahoney after her marriage to actor Jock Mahoney. The mother of actress Sally Field, she was most notable for her work in two science-fiction films, The Man from Planet X (1951) and Captive Women (1952) and played dozens of roles in various television series.

== Early years ==
Margaret Joy Morlan was born on May 10, 1922, in Houston, Texas, the daughter of Joy Beatrice (née Bickeley) and Wallace Miller Morlan. Late in the 1930s, Field and her family moved to Pasadena, California, a suburb of Los Angeles.

== Career ==
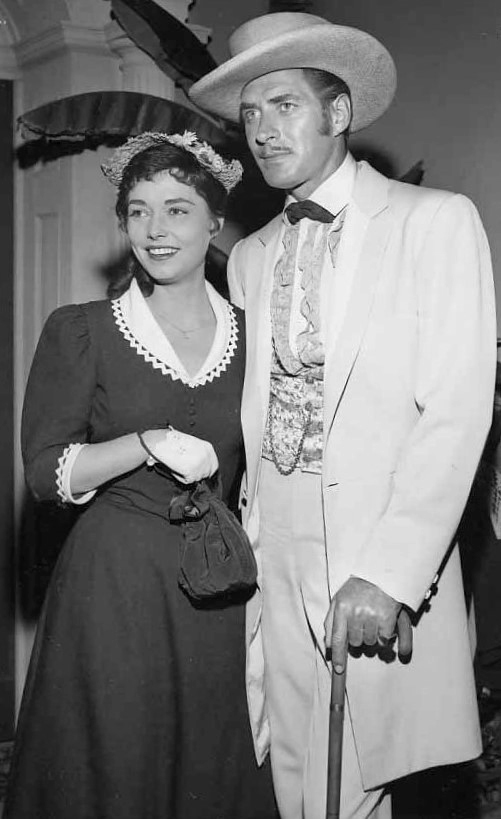
Maggie Mahoney and Jock Mahoney in a 1958 episode of Yancy Derringer

Field was discovered at the Pasadena Playhouse by talent scout Milton Lewis for Paramount Pictures. Following a successful screen test, she was offered an 18-month contract. She then attended Pasadena Junior College, studying voice training and acting, while acting in films. Early in her career, she acted in a series of Musical Parade short films for Paramount and had small roles in 26 full-length films from 1946 to 1953.

She appeared, often more than once, in television series, among which were two roles as defendants on the CBS drama series Perry Mason. In 1959, she played title character Eva Martell in "The Case of the Borrowed Brunette". In 1960, she played Linda Osborne in "The Case of the Nine Dolls". Other television appearances included a 1950 episode of The Lone Ranger entitled "Greed for Gold", Wagon Train, Bonanza, The Virginian, The Range Rider, Yancy Derringer starring her husband Jock Mahoney, To Rome With Love starring John Forsythe, Lawman starring Barry Sullivan and Clu Gulager, Westinghouse Desilu Playhouse, and the 1963 Twilight Zone episode "The New Exhibit", among many others. She also appeared in the science-fiction films Captive Women (1952), and The Man from Planet X (1951). In February 1956, Field co-starred with her husband Jock Mahoney in the Death Valley Days episode "Swamper Ike".

== Personal life ==
In 1942, Field married Richard Dryden Field, an Army officer, and had two children with him: television and film actress Sally Field and physicist Richard D. Field.

On January 21, 1952, Field married actor Jock Mahoney in Tijuana, Mexico, thereafter billed in her acting work as "Maggie Mahoney". Together they had a daughter, Princess O'Mahoney, a director of television shows including ER and Shameless. Field and Mahoney divorced in June 1968.

== Death ==
Field, aged 89, died of cancer at her home in Malibu, California, on November 6, 2011, which was her daughter Sally Field's 65th birthday.

== Filmography ==
Year	Title	Role	Notes
1946	Our Hearts Were Growing Up	Lowell Schoolgirl	Uncredited
1946	Blue Skies	Showgirl	Uncredited
1947	Ladies' Man	Girl at Cocktail Table	Uncredited
1947	The Imperfect Lady	Chorus Girl	Uncredited
1947	Blaze of Noon	Nurse	Uncredited
1947	Welcome Stranger	Photo of Cousin Hattie	Uncredited
1947	The Perils of Pauline	Juliet in Show	Uncredited
1948	The Big Clock	Second Secretary	
1948	Beyond Glory	Cora	
1948	Night Has a Thousand Eyes	Agnes	Uncredited
1948	Isn't It Romantic?	Burly Gent's Second Girl	Uncredited
1948	The Paleface	Guest	Uncredited
1949	My Friend Irma	Alice	
1949	Chicago Deadline	Minerva	
1949	Samson and Delilah	Temple Spectator	Uncredited
1950	Paid in Full	Mother of Betsy	Uncredited
1950	Riding High	Maid	Uncredited
1950	It's a Small World	Janie at Age 16	
1950	A Modern Marriage	Evelyn Brown	
1950	The Du Pont Story	Housewife	Uncredited
1951	The Man from Planet X	Enid Elliot	
1951	The Dakota Kid	Mary Lewis	
1951	Take Care of My Little Girl	Party Guest	Uncredited
1951	Yukon Manhunt	Polly Kaufman	
1951	Chain of Circumstance	Dell Dawson	
1951	The Valparaiso Story		
1951	Venture of Faith		
1952	For Men Only	Julie Brice	
1952	Carrie	Servant Girl	Uncredited
1952	The Story of Will Rogers	Sally Rogers	
1952	Captive Women	Ruth	
1952	The Raiders	Mary Morrell	
1953	So This Is Love	Edna Wallace	
1956	Inside Detroit	Barbara Linden	
1956	Blackjack Ketchum, Desperado	Nita Riordan	
1957	The Walter Winchell File	Louise Melk	Episode: "Where Is Louise Milk?"
1957	Slim Carter	Hat Check Girl	
1960	Desire in the Dust	Maude Wilson	

== Selected television ==
Year	Title	Role	Notes
1953	Death Valley Days	Laurie	Season 1, Episode 12, "Swamper Ike"
1960	Perry Mason	Linda Osborne	Season 4, Episode 9, "The Case of the Nine Dolls"
1961	Lawman	Ann Turner	Season 3, Episode 38, "Cold Fear"
1963	Twilight Zone	Emma Senescu	Season 4, Episode 13, "The New Exhibit"
