= Lucretia Van Horn =

American artist (1882–1970)

- Born: Lucretia Blow Le Bourgeois; 1882
- Died: 1970 (aged 87–88)
- Education: Art Students League of New York; Académie Julian
- Known for: Painting, Drawing, Sculpture, Printmaking, Ceramics
- Spouse: Robert Osborn Van Horn (m. 1908)
- Awards: Concours Julian-Smith Award

Lucretia Blow Le Bourgeois Van Horn (1882–1970) was an American artist. When she was eighteen, she enrolled in the Art Students League of New York where she took classes from John Twachtman and George Bridgman. She then traveled to Paris in 1902 to continue her studies at the Académie Julian where she was the first woman to be awarded the Concours Julian-Smith in 1904.

On her return to the United States, she began to earn commissions mainly for her meticulous illustrations in magazines and books, like those she drew for Helen Hay Whitney's book of poems, entitled Herbs and Apples (1910). In San Antonio, Texas, she helped form the San Antonio Conversation Society in 1924. In 1926 she met Diego Rivera. As Rivera was finishing his mural project at the Ministry of Education in Mexico City, Mrs. Van Horn joined him and other artists in the production of the work. Rivera painted her face in one of the murals on the third floor of the building.

For four years (1928–1932), she and her husband lived in Berkeley, California where she joined various art leagues and worked with prominent artists in the Bay Area, including John Emmett Gerrity, David Park and Galka Scheyer who represented The Blue Four: European abstractionists, Feininger, Kandinsky, Jawlensky and Klee. She also became a member of the San Francisco Art Association and the Society of Women Artist, won several notable awards, and was included in a major international retrospective at the Legion of Honor in San Francisco as one of thirty-five American artists.

During a trip to Mexico is 1926, Van Horn met and befriended Diego Rivera. He was working on a mural for the Ministry of Education in Mexico city at the time. During her time in Mexico, Van Horn was greatly influenced by Rivera which led to a major transformation in her work. Her subject matter became mostly native peasant women, pictured in an outside setting and much more simplified than her earlier works.

She returned to Berkeley in 1941 after her husband died. She contacted an old Berkeley colleague, Marjorie Eaton who lived in Palo Alto on the Juana Briones Ranch, owned by Ms. Eaton's mother. There she spent the last twenty-eight years of her life. Mrs. Van Horn's life was peripatetic and at times difficult. Her mother died when she was three, and shortly after moved from her family's sugar plantation on the Mississippi River to New Orleans. When she fourteen, she went to live in Washington, D.C., with her socially and politically involved aunt and uncle, Martha and Herbert Wadsworth.

In Washington she met Douglas MacArthur, who fell in love with her, as evidenced by a recently discovered cache of letters written to her by him. Around the same time she met her husband Robert Osborn Van Horn; they were married in 1908. Van Horn was also a military officer who subsequently served under MacArthur during the First World War and retired as a brigadier general in 1940.

During her married years, Van Horn lived in many places: Cuba, Georgia, Kansas, Texas, and California. She and her husband had two daughters: Margaret born in 1909 and Lucretia in 1916. When Margaret contracted tuberculosis and died in 1932, Van Horn, devastated by the loss, left her family for some time. It is not clear where she went or for how long.

Van Horn's artistic evolution went through at least three distinctive phases. Her early illustrations reflect her attraction to the work of Maxfield Parrish, her work of the late 1920s and 1930s are patterned on the images of Diego Rivera, and her later work was influenced by the European abstractionists, most especially her favorite, Paul Klee.
