= Indestructible Man =

1956 film by Jack Pollexfen

- Promotional film poster
- Directed by: Jack Pollexfen
- Written by: Vy Russell; Sue Dwiggins
- Produced by: Jack Pollexfen
- Starring: Lon Chaney Jr.; Max Showalter; Marian Carr
- Cinematography: John L. Russell
- Edited by: Fred R. Feitshans Jr.
- Music by: Albert Glasser (uncredited)
- Production company: C.G.K. Productions
- Distributed by: Allied Artists Pictures
- Release date: March 25, 1956 (United States)
- Running time: 72 minutes
- Country: United States
- Language: English

Full film

Indestructible Man is a 1956 American crime horror science fiction film, an original screenplay by Vy Russell and Sue Dwiggins for producer-director Jack Pollexfen and starring Lon Chaney Jr., Ross Elliott, and Robert Shayne.

The picture was produced independently by C.G.K. Productions, and distributed in the United States by Allied Artists Pictures Corporation. The film was distributed theatrically in 1956 on a double bill with World Without End (and in some areas with Invasion of the Body Snatchers).

== Plot ==
Told in a narrative noir style mostly on Los Angeles location, popularized by the television police series Dragnet, by police detective Dick Chasen, the story concerns a 72-hour period of horror for the city of Los Angeles. Charles "Butcher" Benton is a double-crossed convicted robber and murderer who was executed in the gas chamber. His body is unlawfully sold to a scientist who plans to move his experiments into the cause and cure of cancer to human subjects by rejuvenating damaged human tissue. Benton's corpse is subjected to chemical injection and massive jolts of high-voltage electricity in order to study the effect on human tissues. But Benton's heart is re-stimulated and he completely revives (though rendered mute due to electrical damage to his vocal cords), immensely strong by accelerated growth of cellular mass and with his skin virtually impervious to trauma, scalpels, police bullets, even to bazooka shells.

After killing the doctor and his assistant, Benton sets out in a psychotic rage to avenge himself on his two henchmen and his attorney, Paul Lowe who, in collusion with the henchmen, had betrayed Benton in order to steal his loot. Benton had left the location map of his stash to his stripper-girlfriend, who had since gone straight and begun dating the detective who brought Benton to justice, after she had rejected the lawyer's own advances.

The story then follows Benton's revenge on his enemies; the police who first learn of a wave of mysterious killings, then of Benton's reanimation; and the developing relationship between the detective and the stripper. The lawyer, Lowe, fearing for his life after the two henchmen are murdered, confesses the plot to the police, and reveals that Benton had always used the sewer system to evade detection; and to find a hiding place for the money, as it turns out.

Tracked down by the police, Benton takes a direct hit in the solar plexus from a bazooka, and is heavily burned by a flamethrower. Weakened, he flees to a power station, where he climbs atop a gantry, inadvertently setting it in motion. As he watches the actions of the police down below, he fails to notice that the gantry is moving toward the main transformer. A dangling hook comes too close to one of the terminals, and the other transformers erupt in sparks. as hundreds of thousands of volts surge throughout its metal frame, searing Benton to ashes. On a quiet night a few days later, Chasen successfully proposes to his girlfriend at a drive-in hamburger stand.

== Personnel ==
=== Cast ===
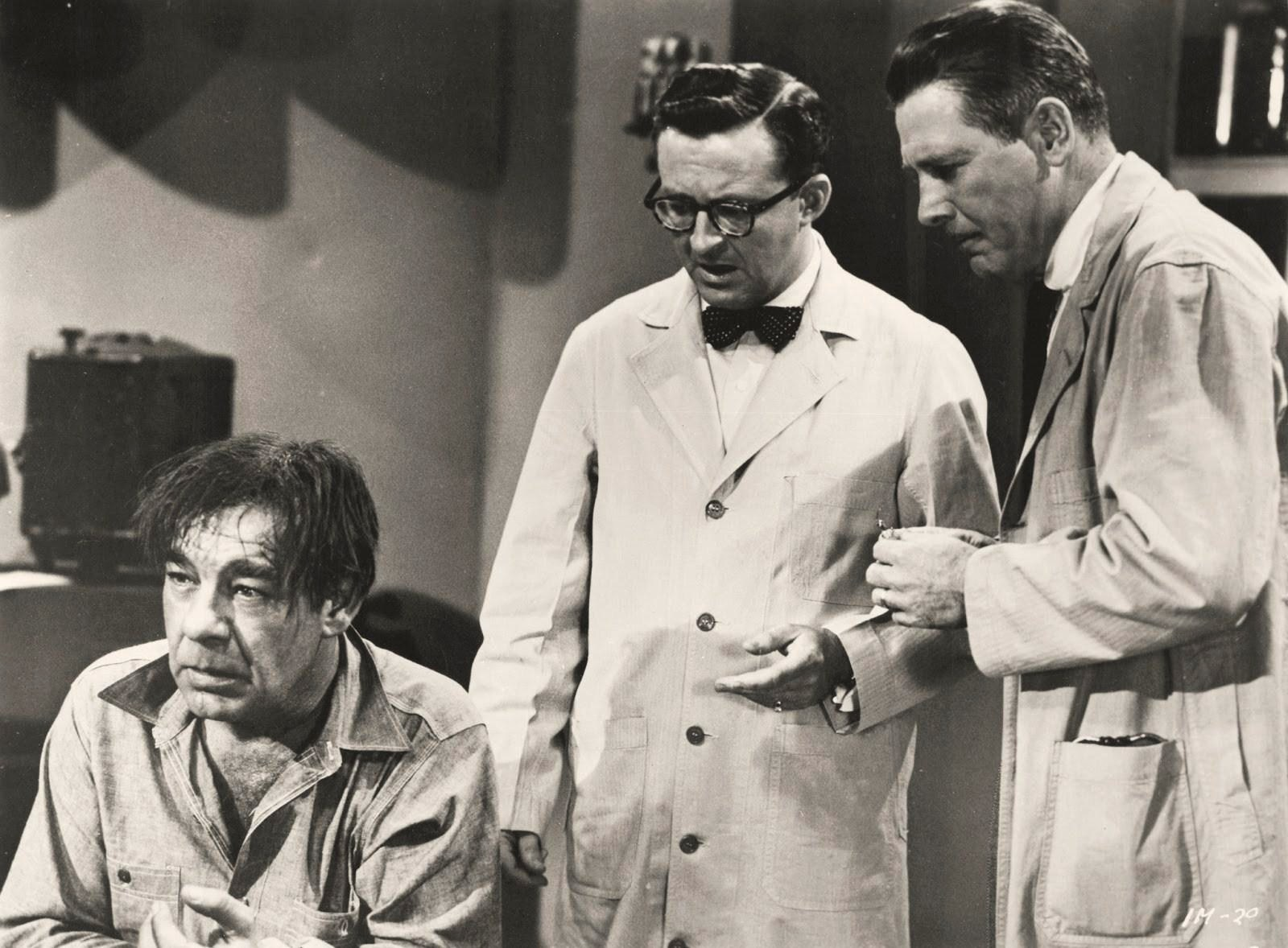
Lon Chaney Jr., Joe Flynn and Robert Shayne in Indestructible Man (1956)

Starring:

- Lon Chaney Jr. as Charles "Butcher" Benton
- Max Showalter as Lt. Richard Chasen (as Casey Adams)
- Marian Carr as Eva Martin
- Ross Elliott as Paul Lowe

Featuring:

- Stuart Randall as Capt. John Lauder
- Marvin Press* as Henchman "Squeamy" Ellis
- Ken Terrell as Henchman Joe Marcelli
- Roy Engel as the Desk Sergeant
- Robert Foulk as Harry the Bartender
- Robert Shayne as Dr. Bradshaw
- Joe Flynn as Bradshaw's Assistant (uncredited)
- Peggy Maley as Francine, a stripper
- Marjorie Bennett as Floozie at Bar

* Marvin Press was misidentified as Marvin Ellis (the last name of his character) in all the film's publicity. His name was entirely omitted from the screen cast list.

=== Crew ===
- Ted Holsopple as Art Director
- John Russell Jr. as Director of Photography
- Fred Feitshans Jr. as Film Editor
- Albert Glasser as "Music"
- Chris Beute as Production Manager

== Production background ==
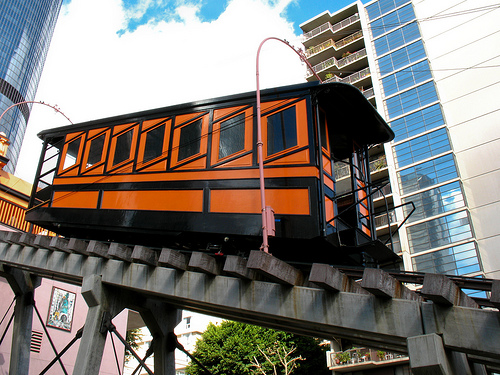
Angels Flight car in 2008

- Chaney has almost no dialogue in the film. His character's emotions were shown through physical gesture reminiscent of his iconic father’s silent movie persona and extreme close-ups of his face.

Los Angeles landmarks Angels Flight, a unique short trolly up a steep downtown hill, and the Bradbury Building's interior open air court, appear prominently in this film.

Production stills exist of scenes not in the film as released. One shows "Butcher" Benton at a jail where a policeman's body lies on the ground as Benton carries off Eva Martin. The scene logically came after the police threatened to release Paul Lowe from custody if he does not reveal the location of Benton's loot, and before the scene where it is revealed Eva has checked herself out of a hospital, presumably after recovering from unspecified injuries. Presumably, this scene is where Benton made good on his threat to get Paul Lowe, breaking into the jail to do it.

Lead Max Showalter, credited the film as Casey Adams, appeared in scores of movies and television series episodes, perhaps most uniquely remembered as playing the father, Ward Cleaver, in the pilot for TV series Leave It to Beaver, before being replaced by Hugh Beaumont. Veteran character actor Robert Shayne, as the scientist, was best known for playing Inspector Henderson in the 1950s Adventures of Superman TV series. Although Joe Flynn played a serious short role in this film, he later specialized in comedic roles, most memorably as the irascible Captain Binghamton on TV's McHale's Navy (1962–1966).

== Bibliography ==
The full story of the making of the movie (complete with interviews with some of the participants) plus the script and pressbook are featured in the book Scripts from the Crypt: 'Indestructible Man' (BearManor, 2015) by Tom Weaver.

== In popular culture ==
- John Darnielle of the Mountain Goats wrote and performed "Rotten Stinking Mouthpiece", referencing a line spoken by Chaney's character to his double-crossing lawyer.
- The 2003 Thom Andersen film essay Los Angeles Plays Itself featured clips from the film.

== Home media ==
The film has been released by numerous studios as a "bargain bin" disc. In addition, the Mystery Science Theater 3000 version of the film has been released by Rhino Home Video as part of the Collection Volume 11 box set, which was released by Shout Factory in 2019.

== See also ==
- List of American films of 1956
- List of films in the public domain in the United States
