= Galka Scheyer =

German-American painter

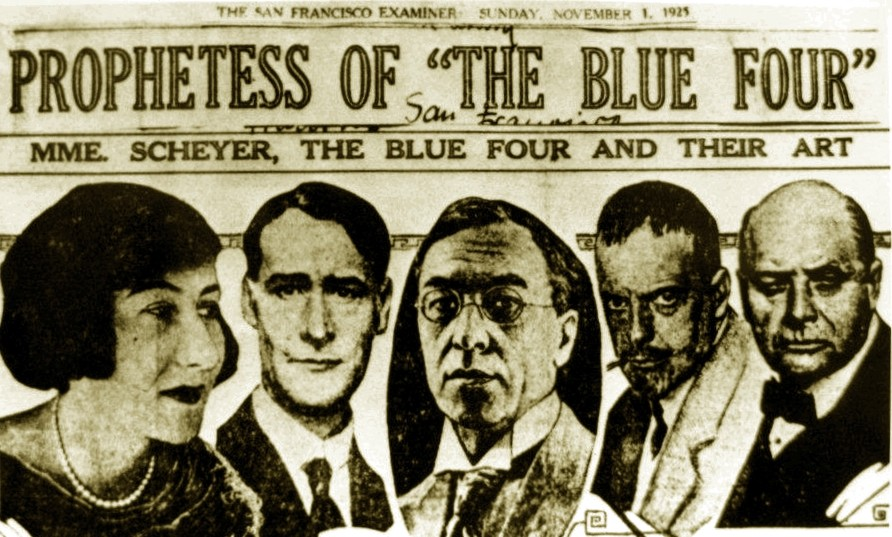
Galka Scheyer with Lyonel Feininger, Wassily Kandinsky, Paul Klee, and Alexej von Jawlensky. Collage on a newspaper page of the "San Francisco Examiner" from November 1, 1925

Galka Scheyer (born Emilie Esther Scheyer; 15 April 1889, Braunschweig – 13 December 1945, Los Angeles) was a German-American painter, art dealer, art collector, and teacher. She was the founder of the "Blue Four," an artists' group that consisted of Lyonel Feininger, Wassily Kandinsky, Paul Klee and Alexej von Jawlensky.

== Early life and education ==
Born in 1889 in Braunschweig, Germany, to a middle-class Jewish family, Galka Emmy Scheyer studied art and English in London, took painting lessons from Braunschweig artist Gustav Lehmann, traveled to Italy with him and spent a couple of years in Paris at the École des Beaux-Arts. By 1916, she was working as a painter in Brussels.

== The Blue Four and California ==
Scheyer's commitment to the Blue Four began in 1915, when she first saw the work of Russian artist Jawlensky in Lausanne, Switzerland. She organized his participation in a group show at Nassauischer Kunstverein, Wiesbaden, in 1921. That same year, on a trip to the Bauhaus in Weimar, Germany, Jawlensky introduced her to Feininger, Kandinsky and Klee, who were instructors at the avant-garde art school.

From 1924 Scheyer represented the Blue Four in the United States, organizing the first American exhibition of their work at the Charles Daniel Gallery, New York, in 1925. The next year she travelled to the west coast and began arranging exhibits of work by the Blue Four and giving lectures on their work in multiple major cities. Scheyer initially settled in the Bay Area. In 1926 she was named the "European representative" of the Oakland Art Gallery, an unpaid position. She also taught art at the Anna Head School in Berkeley in the 1920s. A Blue Four show she co-sponsored in Los Angeles with the film director Josef von Sternberg attracted the modernist collectors Walter and Louise Arensberg, whose holdings Scheyer eventually seeded with Paul Klees. By 1930 she decided to move to Los Angeles, basing that decision on sales to the Arensbergs and on hopes of selling to other Hollywood collectors. In her promotional zeal, Scheyer even lent works by the Blue Four as props in movies. Scheyer had met architect Rudolph Schindler and lived briefly in his Kings Road House in 1931. Scheyer finally moved west in 1933, buying land in the Hollywood Hills and commissioning Richard Neutra to build a concrete and glass house on a winding street, off Sunset Plaza, which she named Blue Heights Drive. In Los Angeles, her circle of friends included artists Edward Weston and Stanton Macdonald-Wright, architects Frank Lloyd Wright, Neutra and Rudolph Schindler, collectors like the Arensbergs, Aline Barnsdall and bookseller Jake Zeitlin.

Scheyer's continuous efforts to promote the Blue Four widened the influence of European modernism in the United States. John Cage and Diego Rivera were among those introduced to the work of these artists through Scheyer. Scheyer also posed for Jawlensky frequently, and in 1927, artist Lucretia Van Horn painted a portrait of Scheyer.

== Blue Four Group Exhibitions ==
- Berlin, 1929
- Chicago, 1932
- Honolulu, 1941
- Los Angeles, 1926, 1933
- Mexico City, 1931
- New York, 1925, 1944
- Oakland, 1926, 1931
- Portland, 1927
- San Diego, 1927
- San Francisco, 1926, 1927, 1931
- Santa Barbara, 1932
- Seattle, 1927
- Spokane, 1927
- Stanford, 1925

== Legacy ==
At her death in 1945, Scheyer left her collection to UCLA with the proviso that the university meet conditions of a 1944 gift of her friend Walter Arensberg's modern art collection. Arensberg's donation required UCLA to provide a building for his collection within five years; Scheyer further stipulated that the university must publish a modest catalogue of her collection. When UCLA failed to meet the conditions, the Arensberg collection went to the Philadelphia Museum of Art, while the fate of the Scheyer collection was left to a committee.

In 1953, the committee entrusted Scheyer's collection of 450 works by the Blue Four and other modern artists (plus a cache of 800 documents) to the Pasadena Art Institute, which evolved into the Pasadena Art Museum and moved to a new building on Colorado Boulevard. The museum's curator, John Coplans, regarded the Scheyer collection as its greatest cultural asset. Norton Simon took over the facility in 1974. A sampling of the Scheyer holding is frequently on view at the Norton Simon Museum.

Scheyer's will required that the institution receiving her collection "publish an illustrated catalogue of the Collection with as many color and photographic reproductions of the pictures as possible, and a minimum of written descriptive matter." Simon fulfilled that obligation in 1976, confirming the museum's ownership of the collection. In 2002, the Norton Simon Art Foundation commissioned scholar Vivan Endicott Barnett to write a complete catalogue of the Blue Four Galka Scheyer Collection, titled "The Blue Four Collection at the Norton Simon Museum" and published by Yale University Press. Her correspondence, the Galka Scheyer papers from 1917 to 1945, are part of the Archives of American Art. In 1960, the University Gallery at the University of Minnesota exhibited paintings, drawings and prints by Paul Klee from the Galka E. Scheyer Collection.

In 2017, the Norton Simon Museum presented a large-scale exhibition about Scheyer and the artists she promoted entitled Maven of Modernism: Galka Scheyer in California.
