= Sword of Venus =

1953 film

- Theatrical release poster
- Directed by: Harold Daniels
- Written by: Jack Pollexfen; Aubrey Wisberg
- Produced by: Jack Pollexfen; Aubrey Wisberg; Albert Zugsmith
- Starring: Robert Clarke; Catherine McLeod; Dan O'Herlihy; William Schallert; Marjorie Stapp
- Cinematography: John L. Russell
- Edited by: W. Donn Hayes
- Music by: Charles Koff
- Production company: American Pictures
- Distributed by: RKO Pictures
- Release dates: January 21, 1953 (Los Angeles); February 20, 1953 (United States)
- Running time: 73 minutes
- Country: United States
- Language: English

Sword of Venus is a 1953 American adventure film directed by Harold Daniels, written by Jack Pollexfen and Aubrey Wisberg, and starring Robert Clarke, Catherine McLeod, Dan O'Herlihy, William Schallert and Marjorie Stapp. It was released on February 20, 1953, by RKO Pictures. It was also released in the U.K. as The Island of Monte Cristo.

== Plot ==
The Count of Monte Cristo's son is framed for a murder he did not commit by a man who is plotting to get his hands on his wealth, a man who was one of his father's deadliest enemies.

== Cast ==
- Robert Clarke as Robert Dantes
- Catherine McLeod as Claire
- Dan O'Herlihy as Danglars
- William Schallert as Valmont
- Marjorie Stapp as Duchess De Villefort
- Merritt Stone as Fernand
- Renee De Marco as Suzette
- Eric Colmar as Goriot
- Stuart Randall as Hugo

== Production ==
The producers wanted Ron Randell for a lead role.
