= Jack Pollexfen =

American film producer

Jack Pollexfen (1908–2003) was an American writer, director and producer.

He collaborated with Aubrey Wisberg on several science fiction and monster movies of the 1950s. Before entering the film industry he worked as a journalist. He directed three films with Dragon's Gold, Indestructible Man and Monstrosity (1964), with the latter being his last film production before retiring back to the Mill Valley area. He suffered through diabetes and diminished eyesight in his later years before contracting pneumonia a few days before he died at Kaiser Permanente Hospital in San Rafael, California. He was married to his wife Lee for 39 years prior to his death.

== Selected filmography ==
- The Man from Planet X (1951)
- Captive Women (1952)
- Sword of Venus (1953)
- Captain John Smith and Pocahontas (1953)
- The Neanderthal Man (1953)
- Captain Kidd and the Slave Girl (1954)
- Return to Treasure Island (1954)
- Son of Sinbad (1955)
- Indestructible Man (1956)
