= Aubrey Wisberg =

American film producer

- Born: October 20, 1909; London, England
- Died: March 14, 1990 (aged 80); New York, New York, U.S.
- Education: Columbia University; New York University
- Occupations: Director; producer; screenwriter

Aubrey Lionel Wisberg (October 20, 1909 – March 14, 1990) was a British-American filmmaker.

== Biography ==
Born in London, Wisberg emigrated to the United States in 1921, attended New York University and Columbia University, and married Barbara Duberstein. Wisberg made his career as a screenwriter, director, and producer with credits in more than 40 films including The Big Fix, The Man from Planet X, Hercules in New York, The Neanderthal Man, Captive Women, Port Sinister and Captain Kidd and the Slave Girl. Three of his early screenplays were World War II films: Counter-Espionage and Submarine Raider in 1942 and They Came to Blow Up America in 1943. Wisberg's 1945 film The Horn Blows at Midnight starred the comedian Jack Benny.

Wisberg was associate producer for Edward Small Productions; founder and executive producer for Wisberg Productions; and co-founder of American Pictures Corporation and Mid-Century Films. Production credits for Mid-Century Film include, The Man From Planet X (1951), Return to Treasure Island (1954) and Murder Is My Beat (1955).

Wisberg was the author of several books, including Patrol Boat 999, Savage Soldiers, This Is the Life and Bushman at Large. Wisberg was also a radio and television dramatist in the United States, Australia, and England; a radio diffusionist in Paris; and a journalist. He won the International Unity Award, from the Inter-Racial Society, for The Burning Cross. Aubrey Wisberg died of cancer in 1990 in New York City. He was 80 years old.

== Selected filmography ==
- 1947: The Big Fix
- 1947: Heaven Only Knows (original story)
- 1951: The Man from Planet X
- 1954: Captain Kidd and the Slave Girl
- 1954: Return to Treasure Island
- 1955: Son of Sinbad
- 1956: The Women of Pitcairn Island
- 1969: Hercules in New York
