= List of American films of 1954 =

American films released in 1954

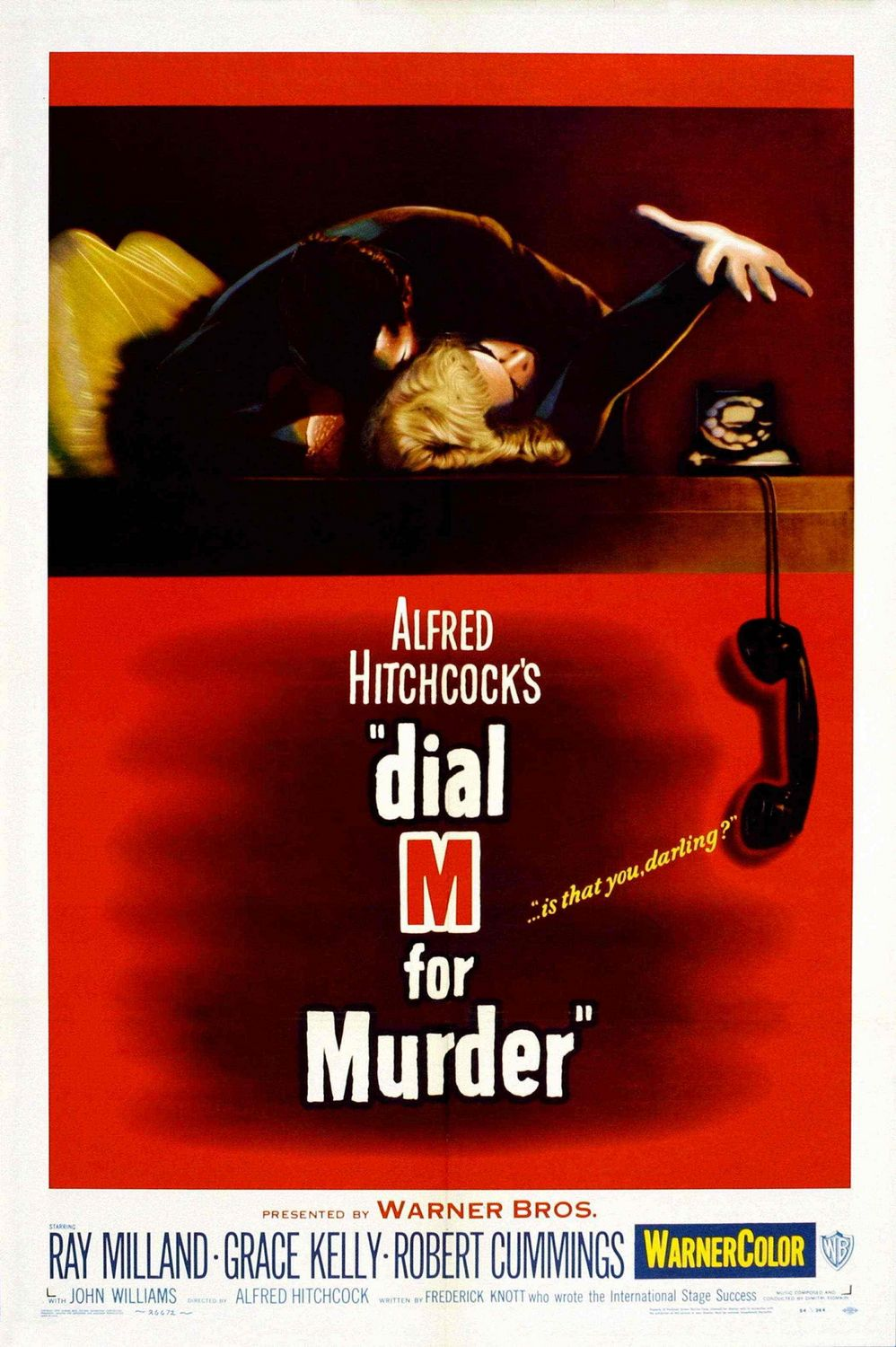
Poster for Dial M for Murder directed by Alfred Hitchcock.

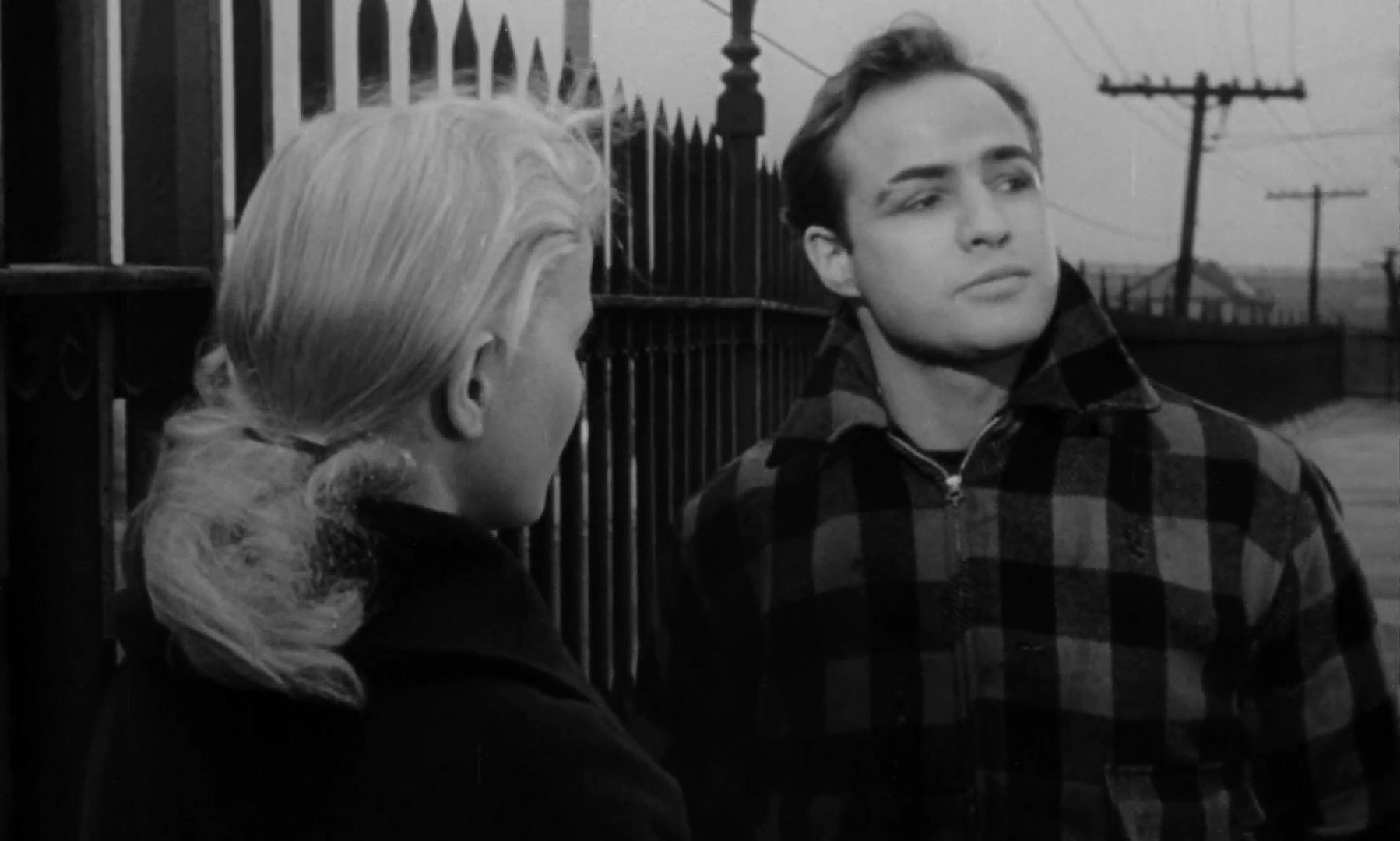
Eva Marie Saint as Edie Doyle and Marlon Brando as Terry Malloy in On the Waterfront

American feature-length motion pictures released in 1954 number at least 253.

On the Waterfront won the Academy Award for Best Picture.

== A-B ==
Title	Director	Cast	Genre	Notes
3 Ring Circus	Joseph Pevney	Dean Martin, Jerry Lewis, Zsa Zsa Gabor, Joanne Dru	Comedy	Paramount
20,000 Leagues Under the Sea	Richard Fleischer	Kirk Douglas, James Mason, Paul Lukas, Peter Lorre	Adventure	Disney; based on the novel by Jules Verne; winner of 2 Academy Awards
About Mrs. Leslie	Daniel Mann	Shirley Booth, Robert Ryan, Marjie Millar	Drama	Paramount
The Adventures of Hajji Baba	Don Weis	John Derek, Elaine Stewart, Rosemarie Bowe	Adventure	20th Century Fox
Alaska Seas	Jerry Hopper	Robert Ryan, Brian Keith, Jan Sterling	Crime	Paramount
Apache	Robert Aldrich	Burt Lancaster, Jean Peters, John McIntire, Charles Bronson	Western	United Artists
Arrow in the Dust	Lesley Selander	Sterling Hayden, Coleen Gray, Keith Larsen	Western	Allied Artists
Athena	Richard Thorpe	Jane Powell, Debbie Reynolds, Virginia Gibson	Musical	MGM
The Atomic Kid	Leslie H. Martinson	Mickey Rooney, Robert Strauss, Elaine Devry	Comedy	Republic
Bait	Hugo Haas	Cleo Moore, John Agar, John Agar	Drama	Columbia
The Bamboo Prison	Lewis Seiler	Robert Francis, Dianne Foster, Brian Keith	War drama	Columbia
The Barefoot Contessa	Joseph L. Mankiewicz	Humphrey Bogart, Ava Gardner, Rossano Brazzi, Edmond O'Brien	Drama	United Artists. Oscar for O'Brien
The Battle of Rogue River	William Castle	George Montgomery, Martha Hyer, Richard Denning	Western	Columbia
Beachhead	Stuart Heisler	Tony Curtis, Frank Lovejoy, Mary Murphy	War	United Artists
Beau Brummell	Curtis Bernhardt	Stewart Granger, Elizabeth Taylor, Peter Ustinov	Biography	MGM; remake of 1924 film
Beautiful Stranger	David Miller	Ginger Rogers, Herbert Lom, Stanley Baker	Mystery	United Artists
Bengal Brigade	Lazlo Benedek	Rock Hudson, Arlene Dahl, Ursula Thiess	Adventure	Universal
Betrayed	Gottfried Reinhardt	Clark Gable, Lana Turner, Victor Mature	Drama	MGM
The Big Chase	Arthur Hilton	Glenn Langan, Adele Jergens, Lon Chaney Jr.	Crime	Lippert
Bitter Creek	Thomas Carr	Bill Elliott, Beverly Garland, Carleton Young	Western	Allied Artists
The Black Dakotas	Ray Nazarro	Wanda Hendrix, Gary Merrill, John Bromfield, Fay Roope, Jay Silverheels, John War Eagle, Noah Beery Jr.	Western	Columbia
Black Horse Canyon	Jesse Hibbs	Joel McCrea, Mari Blanchard, Murvyn Vye	Western	Universal
The Black Knight	Tay Garnett	Alan Ladd, Patricia Medina, Peter Cushing	Adventure	Columbia
The Black Pirates	Allen H. Miner	Anthony Dexter, Martha Roth, Lon Chaney Jr.	Adventure	Lippert
The Black Shield of Falworth	Rudolph Maté	Tony Curtis, Janet Leigh, Barbara Rush	Adventure	Universal
Black Tuesday	Hugo Fregonese	Edward G. Robinson, Peter Graves, Jean Parker	Crime drama	United Artists
Black Widow	Nunnally Johnson	Ginger Rogers, Van Heflin, Gene Tierney, George Raft	Mystery	20th Century Fox
The Bob Mathias Story	Francis D. Lyon	Bob Mathias, Ward Bond, Diane Jergens	Biography	Allied Artists
Border River	George Sherman	Joel McCrea, Yvonne De Carlo, Pedro Armendáriz	Western	Universal
The Bounty Hunter	Andre DeToth	Randolph Scott, Marie Windsor, Dolores Dorn	Western	Warner Bros.
The Bowery Boys Meet the Monsters	Edward Bernds	Leo Gorcey, Huntz Hall, Lloyd Corrigan	Comedy	Allied Artists
The Boy from Oklahoma	Michael Curtiz	Will Rogers Jr., Nancy Olson, Anthony Caruso	Western	Warner Bros.
The Bridges at Toko-Ri	Mark Robson	William Holden, Grace Kelly, Fredric March, Mickey Rooney	War	Paramount; Oscar for Best Visual Effects
Brigadoon	Vincente Minnelli	Gene Kelly, Van Johnson, Cyd Charisse	Musical	MGM; 3 Oscar nominations
Bright Road	Gerald Mayer	Dorothy Dandridge, Harry Belafonte, Barbara Randolph	Drama	MGM
Broken Lance	Edward Dmytryk	Spencer Tracy, Robert Wagner, Richard Widmark, Katy Jurado	Western	20th Century Fox; won Oscar for Best Story
A Bullet Is Waiting	John Farrow	Jean Simmons, Rory Calhoun, Brian Aherne	Film noir	Columbia

== C-D ==
Title	Director	Cast	Genre	Notes
The Caine Mutiny	Edward Dmytryk	Humphrey Bogart, José Ferrer, Van Johnson	War, Drama	Columbia; based on Herman Wouk novel; 7 Oscar nominations
Cannibal Attack	Lee Sholem	Johnny Weissmuller, David Bruce, Bruce Cowling	Adventure	Columbia
Captain Kidd and the Slave Girl	Lew Landers	Anthony Dexter, Eva Gabor, Alan Hale Jr.	Adventure	United Artists
Carmen Jones	Otto Preminger	Harry Belafonte, Dorothy Dandridge, Pearl Bailey	Musical	20th Century Fox; won Golden Globe
Carnival Story	Kurt Neumann	Anne Baxter, Steve Cochran, Lyle Bettger	Drama	RKO; Co-production with West Germany
Casanova's Big Night	Norman Z. McLeod	Bob Hope, Joan Fontaine, Basil Rathbone	Comedy	Paramount
Cattle Queen of Montana	Allan Dwan	Barbara Stanwyck, Ronald Reagan, Gene Evans	Western	RKO
Charge of the Lancers	William Castle	Paulette Goddard, Jean-Pierre Aumont, Karin Booth	Adventure	Columbia
The Command	David Butler	Guy Madison, James Whitmore, Joan Weldon	Western	Warner Bros.
The Country Girl	George Seaton	Bing Crosby, Grace Kelly, William Holden	Drama	Paramount; Oscars for Kelly, screenplay
Creature from the Black Lagoon	Jack Arnold	Richard Carlson, Julie Adams, Richard Denning	Science fiction	Universal; 2 sequels
Crime Wave	André de Toth	Sterling Hayden, Gene Nelson, Ted de Corsia, Phyllis Kirk	Crime drama	Warner Bros.
Crossed Swords	Milton Krims	Errol Flynn, Gina Lollobrigida, Nadia Gray	Swashbuckler	United Artists. Co-produced with Italy
Cry Vengeance	Mark Stevens	Mark Stevens, Skip Homeier, Martha Hyer	Crime	Allied Artists
Dangerous Mission	Louis King	Victor Mature, Piper Laurie, William Bendix	Thriller	RKO
Dawn at Socorro	George Sherman	Rory Calhoun, Piper Laurie, David Brian, Kathleen Hughes	Western	Universal
Deep in My Heart	Stanley Donen	José Ferrer, Merle Oberon, Walter Pidgeon	Musical, Biography	MGM; story of Sigmund Romberg
Demetrius and the Gladiators	Delmer Daves	Victor Mature, Susan Hayward, Michael Rennie, Debra Paget	Adventure	20th Century Fox
Désirée	Henry Koster	Marlon Brando, Jean Simmons, Merle Oberon	Historical	20th Century Fox
The Desperado	Thomas Carr	Wayne Morris, Beverly Garland, Jimmy Lydon	Western	Allied Artists
Destry	George Marshall	Audie Murphy, Mari Blanchard, Lyle Bettger	Western	Universal
Dial M for Murder	Alfred Hitchcock	Grace Kelly, Ray Milland, Robert Cummings, Anthony Dawson	Suspense	Warner Bros.; based on play by Frederick Knott
Down Three Dark Streets	Arnold Laven	Broderick Crawford, Ruth Roman, Martha Hyer	Crime drama	United Artists
Dragnet	Jack Webb	Jack Webb, Richard Boone, Ann Robinson	Film noir	Warner Bros.
Dragon's Gold	Aubrey Wisberg	John Archer, Hillary Brooke, Philip Van Zandt	Crime	United Artists
Dragonfly Squadron	Lesley Selander	John Hodiak, Barbara Britton, Bruce Bennett	War	Allied Artists
Drive a Crooked Road	Richard Quine	Mickey Rooney, Dianne Foster, Kevin McCarthy	Crime	Columbia
Drum Beat	Delmer Daves	Alan Ladd, Audrey Dalton, Marisa Pavan	Western	Warner Bros.
Drums Across the River	Nathan H. Juran	Audie Murphy, Lisa Gaye, Walter Brennan	Western	Universal
Drums of Tahiti	William Castle	Patricia Medina, Dennis O'Keefe, Francis L. Sullivan	Adventure; 3-D	Columbia
Duffy of San Quentin	Walter Doniger	Joanne Dru, Louis Hayward, Maureen O'Sullivan	Drama	Warner Bros.

== E-F ==
Title	Director	Cast	Genre	Notes
The Egyptian	Michael Curtiz	Jean Simmons, Victor Mature, Gene Tierney, Michael Wilding	Adventure	20th Century Fox; based on the book
Elephant Walk	William Dieterle	Elizabeth Taylor, Dana Andrews, Peter Finch	Adventure	Paramount
Executive Suite	Robert Wise	William Holden, Barbara Stanwyck, Fredric March, June Allyson, Walter Pidgeon,	Drama	MGM. 4 Oscar nominations; a rare film with no music
Fangs of the Wild	William F. Claxton	Charles Chaplin Jr., Onslow Stevens, Margia Dean	Adventure; Western	Lippert
The Fast and the Furious	John Ireland	John Ireland, Dorothy Malone, Iris Adrian	Crime	AIP
Fireman Save My Child	Leslie Goodwins	Hugh O'Brian, Buddy Hackett, Adele Jergens	Comedy	Universal
Flame and the Flesh	Richard Brooks	Lana Turner, Pier Angeli, Carlos Thompson	Drama	MGM
The Forty-Niners	Thomas Carr	Bill Elliott, Virginia Grey, Harry Morgan	Western	Allied Artists
Four Guns to the Border	Richard Carlson	Rory Calhoun, Colleen Miller, Nina Foch	Western	Universal
Francis Joins the WACS	Arthur Lubin	Donald O'Connor, Julie Adams, Mamie Van Doren	Comedy	Universal
The French Line	Lloyd Bacon	Jane Russell, Gilbert Roland, Arthur Hunnicutt	Musical	RKO. Made in 3D

== G-H ==
Title	Director	Cast	Genre	Notes
The Gambler from Natchez	Henry Levin	Dale Robertson, Debra Paget, Lisa Daniels	Western	20th Century Fox
Garden of Evil	Henry Hathaway	Gary Cooper, Susan Hayward, Richard Widmark	Western	20th Century Fox
The Glenn Miller Story	Anthony Mann	James Stewart, June Allyson, Charles Drake, George Tobias, Harry Morgan	Biography, Musical	Universal; 3 Oscar nominations
Go Man Go	James Wong Howe	Dane Clark, Sidney Poitier, Ruby Dee	Sports	United Artists
Gog	Herbert L. Strock	Richard Egan, Herbert Marshall, Constance Dowling	Sci-fi	United Artists
The Golden Idol	Ford Beebe	Johnny Sheffield, Anne Kimbell, Paul Guilfoyle	Adventure	Allied Artists
The Golden Mistress	Abner Biberman	John Agar, Rosemarie Bowe	Adventure	United Artists
Gorilla at Large	Harmon Jones	Cameron Mitchell, Anne Bancroft, Lee J. Cobb	Horror	20th Century Fox
The Great Diamond Robbery	Robert Z. Leonard	Red Skelton, James Whitmore, Cara Williams	Comedy	MGM
Green Fire	Andrew Marton	Grace Kelly, Stewart Granger, Paul Douglas	Adventure	MGM
Gypsy Colt	Andrew Marton	Donna Corcoran, Ward Bond, Frances Dee	Family	MGM
Hansel and Gretel	John Paul	Anna Russell, Mildred Dunnock (voices)	Animation	RKO
Hell and High Water	Samuel Fuller	Richard Widmark, Bella Darvi, Victor Francen	Drama	20th Century Fox
Hell Below Zero	Mark Robson	Alan Ladd, Stanley Baker, Joan Tetzel	Adventure	Columbia
Hell's Half Acre	John H. Auer	Evelyn Keyes, Wendell Corey, Marie Windsor	Crime	Republic
Hell's Outpost	Joseph Kane	Rod Cameron, Joan Leslie, John Russell	Drama	Republic
Her Twelve Men	Robert Z. Leonard	Greer Garson, Robert Ryan, Barry Sullivan	Comedy	MGM
The High and the Mighty	William Wellman	John Wayne, Robert Stack, Laraine Day, Claire Trevor	Drama	Warner Bros. 6 Oscar nominations; won for Best Musical Score
Highway Dragnet	Nathan Juran	Richard Conte, Joan Bennett, Wanda Hendrix	Crime drama	Allied Artists
His Majesty O'Keefe	Byron Haskin	Burt Lancaster, Joan Rice, André Morell	Adventure	Warner Bros.
Human Desire	Fritz Lang	Glenn Ford, Gloria Grahame, Broderick Crawford	Suspense	Columbia
The Human Jungle	Joseph M. Newman	Gary Merrill, Jan Sterling, Regis Toomey	Crime	Allied Artists

== I-K ==
Title	Director	Cast	Genre	Notes
The Iron Glove	William Castle	Robert Stack, Ursula Thiess, Richard Stapley	Adventure	Columbia
It Should Happen to You	George Cukor	Judy Holliday, Peter Lawford, Jack Lemmon	Comedy	Columbia. Lemmon's first film
Jail Bait	Ed Wood	Lyle Talbot, Dolores Fuller, Steve Reeves	Drama	Independent
Jesse James vs. the Daltons	William Castle	Brett King, Barbara Lawrence, James Griffith	Western	Columbia
Jesse James' Women	Don "Red" Barry	Peggie Castle, Don "Red" Barry, Lita Baron	Western	United Artists
Jivaro	Edward Ludwig	Fernando Lamas, Rhonda Fleming, Brian Keith	Adventure	Paramount
Johnny Dark	George Sherman	Tony Curtis, Piper Laurie, Don Taylor	Drama, Sport	Universal
Johnny Guitar	Nicholas Ray	Joan Crawford, Sterling Hayden, Mercedes McCambridge	Western	Republic
Jubilee Trail	Joseph Kane	John Russell, Joan Leslie, Forrest Tucker	Western	Republic
Jungle Gents	Edward Bernds	Leo Gorcey, Huntz Hall, Laurette Luez	Comedy	Allied Artists
Jungle Man-Eaters	Sam Katzman	Johnny Weissmuller, Karin Booth, Richard Stapley	Adventure	Columbia
Khyber Patrol	Seymour Friedman	Richard Egan, Dawn Addams, Raymond Burr	Adventure	United Artists
Killer Leopard	Ford Beebe	Johnny Sheffield, Beverly Garland, Leonard Mudie	Adventure	Allied Artists
Killers from Space	W. Lee Wilder	Peter Graves, James Seay, Steve Pendleton	Horror	RKO
King Richard and the Crusaders	David Butler	Rex Harrison, Virginia Mayo, George Sanders	Adventure	Warner Bros.
Knock on Wood	Melvin Frank, Norman Panama	Danny Kaye, Mai Zetterling, Torin Thatcher	Comedy	Paramount

== L-N ==
Title	Director	Cast	Genre	Notes
The Last Time I Saw Paris	Richard Brooks	Van Johnson, Elizabeth Taylor, Donna Reed	Romance	MGM
The Law vs. Billy the Kid	William Castle	Scott Brady, Betta St. John, Paul Cavanagh	Western	Columbia
The Lawless Rider	Yakima Canutt	Johnny Carpenter, Noel Neill, Frankie Darro	Western	United Artists
Living It Up	Norman Taurog	Dean Martin, Jerry Lewis, Janet Leigh	Comedy	Paramount. 11th Martin and Lewis film
The Lone Gun	Ray Nazarro	George Montgomery, Dorothy Malone, Frank Faylen	Western	United Artists
The Long, Long Trailer	Vincente Minnelli	Lucille Ball, Desi Arnaz, Marjorie Main	Comedy	MGM
The Long Wait	Victor Saville	Anthony Quinn, Charles Coburn, Peggie Castle	Film noir	United Artists
Loophole	Harold Schuster	Barry Sullivan, Dorothy Malone, Charles McGraw	Film noir	Monogram
Lucky Me	Jack Donohue	Doris Day, Phil Silvers, Robert Cummings	Musical	Warner Bros.
Ma and Pa Kettle at Home	Charles Lamont	Marjorie Main, Percy Kilbride, Alan Mowbray	Comedy	Universal
The Mad Magician	John Brahm	Vincent Price, Mary Murphy, Eva Gabor	Thriller	Columbia
Make Haste to Live	William A. Seiter	Dorothy McGuire, Stephen McNally	Suspense	Republic
Magnificent Obsession	Douglas Sirk	Rock Hudson, Jane Wyman, Agnes Moorehead, Otto Kruger, Barbara Rush	Drama	Universal. Remake of 1935 film; Oscar nomination for Wyman
Massacre Canyon	Fred F. Sears	Philip Carey, Audrey Totter, Douglas Kennedy	Western	Columbia
Masterson of Kansas	William Castle	George Montgomery, Nancy Gates, James Griffith	Western	Columbia
Men of the Fighting Lady	Andrew Marton	Van Johnson, Walter Pidgeon, Frank Lovejoy	War	MGM
The Miami Story	Fred F. Sears	Barry Sullivan, Luther Adler, Adele Jergens	Film noir	Columbia
Miss Robin Crusoe	Eugene Frenke	Amanda Blake, George Nader	Adventure	20th Century Fox
Monster from the Ocean Floor	Wyott Ordung	Anne Kimbell, Stuart Wade, Inez Palange	Science fiction	Lippert
Naked Alibi	Jerry Hopper	Sterling Hayden, Gloria Grahame, Gene Barry	Film noir	Universal
The Naked Jungle	Byron Haskin	Charlton Heston, Eleanor Parker, Abraham Sofaer	Adventure	Paramount
New Faces	Harry Horner	Ronny Graham, Eartha Kitt, Robert Clary	Musical	20th Century Fox
Night People	Nunnally Johnson	Gregory Peck, Broderick Crawford, Anita Bjork, Rita Gam	Drama	20th Century Fox

== O-R ==
Title	Director	Cast	Genre	Notes
On the Waterfront	Elia Kazan	Marlon Brando, Eva Marie Saint, Karl Malden, Rod Steiger, Lee J. Cobb	Drama	Columbia. Based on novel by Budd Schulberg; Oscars for Brando, Saint, Best Picture
The Other Woman	Hugo Haas	Cleo Moore, Hugo Haas, Lucille Barkley	Drama	20th Century Fox
The Outcast	William Witney	John Derek, Joan Evans, Jim Davis	Western	Republic
The Outlaw's Daughter	Wesley Barry	Bill Williams, Jim Davis, George Cleveland	Western	20th Century Fox
The Outlaw Stallion	Fred F. Sears	Philip Carey, Dorothy Patrick, Billy Gray	Western	Columbia
Overland Pacific	Fred F. Sears	Jock Mahoney, Peggie Castle, Adele Jergens	Western	United Artists
Paris Playboys	William Beaudine	Leo Gorcey, Huntz Hall, Steven Geray	Comedy	Allied Artists
Passion	Allan Dwan	Cornel Wilde, Yvonne De Carlo, Raymond Burr	Western	RKO
Phantom of the Rue Morgue	Roy Del Ruth	Karl Malden, Claude Dauphin, Patricia Medina	Mystery	Warner Bros.; based on a story by Edgar Allan Poe
Phantom Stallion	Harry Keller	Rex Allen, Carla Balenda, Harry Shannon	Western	Republic
Phffft!	Mark Robson	Judy Holliday, Jack Lemmon, Jack Carson	Romantic comedy	Columbia
Playgirl	Joseph Pevney	Shelley Winters, Colleen Miller, Barry Sullivan	Film noir	Universal
Port of Hell	Harold D. Schuster	Dane Clark, Carole Mathews, Wayne Morris	Drama	Allied Artists
Pride of the Blue Grass	William Beaudine	Lloyd Bridges, Vera Miles, Margaret Sheridan	Drama	Allied Artists
Prince Valiant	Henry Hathaway	James Mason, Janet Leigh, Robert Wagner	Adventure	20th Century Fox; based on the comic strip
Princess of the Nile	Harmon Jones	Debra Paget, Jeffrey Hunter, Michael Rennie	Adventure	20th Century Fox
Prisoner of War	Andrew Marton	Ronald Reagan, Steve Forrest, Oscar Homolka	War drama	MGM
Private Hell 36	Don Siegel	Ida Lupino, Howard Duff, Dorothy Malone	Film noir	Independent
Pushover	Richard Quine	Fred MacMurray, Kim Novak, Philip Carey, Dorothy Malone	Film noir	Columbia; Novak's 1st film
Racing Blood	Wesley Barry	Bill Williams, Jean Porter, George Cleveland	Drama	20th Century Fox
The Raid	Hugo Fregonese	Van Heflin, Anne Bancroft, Richard Boone, Lee Marvin	Western	20th Century Fox
Rails Into Laramie	Jesse Hibbs	John Payne, Mari Blanchard, Dan Duryea	Western	Universal
Rear Window	Alfred Hitchcock	Grace Kelly, James Stewart, Thelma Ritter, Wendell Corey, Raymond Burr	Film noir	Universal, 4 Oscar nominations
Red Garters	George Marshall	Rosemary Clooney, Jack Carson, Guy Mitchell, Gene Barry	Musical	Paramount
Return from the Sea	Lesley Selander	Jan Sterling, Neville Brand, John Doucette	Drama	Allied Artists
Return to Treasure Island	Ewald André Dupont	Tab Hunter, Dawn Addams, Porter Hall	Adventure	United Artists
Rhapsody	Charles Vidor	Elizabeth Taylor, Vittorio Gassman, Louis Calhern	Drama	MGM
Ricochet Romance	Charles Lamont	Marjorie Main, Chill Wills, Alfonso Bedoya	Western comedy	Universal
Ride Clear of Diablo	Jesse Hibbs	Audie Murphy, Dan Duryea, Susan Cabot, Russell Johnson	Western	Universal
Riders to the Stars	Richard Carlson	William Lundigan, Martha Hyer, Dawn Addams	Science fiction	United Artists
Riding Shotgun	Andre DeToth	Randolph Scott, Joan Weldon, Wayne Morris	Western	Warner Bros.
Ring of Fear	James Edward Grant	Clyde Beatty, Mickey Spillane, Pat O'Brien	Mystery	Warner Bros.
Riot in Cell Block 11	Don Siegel	Neville Brand, Frank Faylen, Leo Gordon	Film noir	Allied Artists
River of No Return	Otto Preminger	Robert Mitchum, Marilyn Monroe, Rory Calhoun	Western	20th Century Fox
Robinson Crusoe	Luis Buñuel	Dan O'Herlihy, Jaime Fernández, Felipe de Alba	Adventure	United Artists. From Daniel Defoe novel
The Rocket Man	Oscar Rudolph	Charles Coburn, Anne Francis, Spring Byington	Comedy	20th Century Fox
Rogue Cop	Roy Rowland	Robert Taylor, George Raft, Janet Leigh	Film noir	MGM
Roogie's Bump	Harold Young	Ruth Warrick, Olive Blakeney, Robert F. Simon	Comedy	Republic
Rose Marie	Mervyn LeRoy	Ann Blyth, Howard Keel, Fernando Lamas	Musical, Western	MGM; Remake of 1936 film

== S-T ==
Title	Director	Cast	Genre	Notes
Sabaka	Frank Ferrin	Boris Karloff, June Foray, Reginald Denny	Adventure	United Artists
Sabrina	Billy Wilder	Humphrey Bogart, Audrey Hepburn, William Holden	Romantic comedy	Paramount; 6 Oscar nominations; remade in 1995
Salt of the Earth	Herbert J. Biberman	Rosaura Revueltas, Will Geer, David Bauer	Drama	Independent. Subject of One of the Hollywood Ten
The Saracen Blade	William Castle	Ricardo Montalbán, Betta St. John, Carolyn Jones	Adventure	Columbia
Saskatchewan	Raoul Walsh	Alan Ladd, Shelley Winters, J. Carrol Naish	Western	Universal
Secret of the Incas	Jerry Hopper	Charlton Heston, Robert Young, Nicole Maurey	Adventure	Paramount
Security Risk	Harold D. Schuster	John Ireland, Dorothy Malone, Dolores Donlon	Thriller	Allied Artists
Seven Brides for Seven Brothers	Stanley Donen	Howard Keel, Jane Powell, Russ Tamblyn, Jeff Richards, Julie Newmar, Ruta Lee	Musical	MGM; 5 Oscar nominations
The Shanghai Story	Frank Lloyd	Ruth Roman, Edmond O'Brien, Richard Jaeckel	Drama	Republic
She Couldn't Say No	Lloyd Bacon	Robert Mitchum, Jean Simmons, Arthur Hunnicutt	Comedy	RKO. Bacon's final film
Shield for Murder	Edmond O'Brien	Edmond O'Brien, Marla English, John Agar	Film noir	United Artists
Siege at Red River	Rudolph Maté	Van Johnson, Joanne Dru, Richard Boone	Western	20th Century Fox
Sign of the Pagan	Douglas Sirk	Jack Palance, Jeff Chandler, Rita Gam	Adventure	Universal
Silent Raiders	Richard Bartlett	Richard Bartlett, Dean Fredericks	War	Lippert
The Silver Chalice	Victor Saville	Paul Newman, Virginia Mayo, Pier Angeli	Drama	Warner Bros.; first film for Newman
Silver Lode	Allan Dwan	Dan Duryea, John Payne, Lizabeth Scott	Western	RKO
Sitting Bull	Sidney Salkow	Dale Robertson, Mary Murphy, J. Carrol Naish	Western	United Artists
The Snow Creature	W. Lee Wilder	Paul Langton, Teru Shimada, William Phipps	Science fiction	United Artists
Southwest Passage	Ray Nazarro	Joanne Dru, Rod Cameron, John Ireland	Western	United Artists
A Star Is Born	George Cukor	Judy Garland, James Mason, Charles Bickford, Jack Carson, Tommy Noonan	Musical	Warner Bros. remake of 1937 film; 6 Oscar nominations; remade in 1976
The Steel Cage	Walter Doniger	Maureen O'Sullivan, Lawrence Tierney, Paul Kelly	Drama	United Artists
The Student Prince	Richard Thorpe	Ann Blyth, Edmund Purdom, Louis Calhern, Edmund Gwenn, Betta St. John	Musical	MGM; vocals by Mario Lanza; based on the operetta
Suddenly	Lewis Allen	Frank Sinatra, Sterling Hayden, Nancy Gates	Crime drama	United Artists
Susan Slept Here	Frank Tashlin	Dick Powell, Debbie Reynolds, Anne Francis	Romantic comedy	RKO; Powell's final film
Tanganyika	André de Toth	Van Heflin, Ruth Roman, Howard Duff	Action	Universal
Target Earth	Sherman A. Rose	Richard Denning, Kathleen Crowley, Virginia Grey	Sci-fi	Allied Artists
Taza, Son of Cochise	Douglas Sirk	Rock Hudson, Barbara Rush, Rex Reason	Western	Universal
Tennessee Champ	Fred M. Wilcox	Shelley Winters, Keenan Wynn, Dewey Martin	Drama	MGM
Them!	Gordon Douglas	James Whitmore, Edmund Gwenn, Joan Weldon	Science fiction	Warner Bros.
There's No Business Like Show Business	Walter Lang	Ethel Merman, Donald O'Connor, Marilyn Monroe, Mitzi Gaynor, Dan Dailey, Johnnie Ray	Musical	20th Century Fox; 3 Academy Award nominations
They Rode West	Phil Karlson	Robert Francis, Donna Reed, Philip Carey, May Wynn, John War Eagle	Western	Columbia
They Were So Young	Kurt Neumann	Raymond Burr, Scott Brady, Johanna Matz	Crime	Lippert; Co-production with West Germany
This Is My Love	Stuart Heisler	Linda Darnell, Faith Domergue, Dan Duryea	Drama	RKO
Three Coins in the Fountain	Jean Negulesco	Clifton Webb, Dorothy McGuire, Jean Peters, Rossano Brazzi	Drama	20th Century Fox; Oscars for Cinematography and Song
Three Hours to Kill	Alfred L. Werker	Dana Andrews, Donna Reed, Dianne Foster	Western	Columbia
Three Young Texans	Henry Levin	Jeffrey Hunter, Keefe Brasselle, Mitzi Gaynor	Western	20th Century Fox
Thunder Pass	Frank McDonald	Dane Clark, Dorothy Patrick, Andy Devine	Western	Lippert
Tobor the Great	Lee Sholem	Charles Drake, Karin Booth, Steven Geray	Sci-fi	Republic
Top Banana	Alfred E. Green	Phil Silvers, Rose Marie, Judy Lynn	Musical	United Artists. Based on stage musical
Track of the Cat	William Wellman	Robert Mitchum, Teresa Wright, Diana Lynn	Adventure	Warner Bros.

== U-Z ==
Title	Director	Cast	Genre	Notes
Untamed Heiress	Charles Lamont	Judy Canova, George Cleveland, George Cleveland	Comedy	Republic
Two Guns and a Badge	Lewis D. Collins	Wayne Morris, Beverly Garland, Morris Ankrum	Western	Allied Artists
Valley of the Kings	Robert Pirosh	Robert Taylor, Eleanor Parker, Carlos Thompson	Adventure	MGM
Vera Cruz	Robert Aldrich	Gary Cooper, Burt Lancaster, Ernest Borgnine, Cesar Romero, Sara Montiel, Denise Darcel	Western	United Artists
War Arrow	George Sherman	Maureen O'Hara, Jeff Chandler, John McIntire	Western	Universal
White Christmas	Michael Curtiz	Rosemary Clooney, Bing Crosby, Danny Kaye, Vera-Ellen, Dean Jagger	Musical	Paramount; title song by Irving Berlin originally in 1942's Holiday Inn
The White Orchid	Reginald LeBorg	William Lundigan, Peggie Castle, Rosenda Monteros	Adventure	United Artists
Witness to Murder	Roy Rowland	Barbara Stanwyck, George Sanders, Gary Merrill	Suspense	United Artists
Woman's World	Jean Negulesco	Clifton Webb, June Allyson, Van Heflin	Drama	20th Century Fox
World for Ransom	Robert Aldrich	Dan Duryea, Gene Lockhart, Patric Knowles	Drama	Allied Artists
Wyoming Renegades	Fred F. Sears	Phil Carey, Gene Evans, Martha Hyer	Western	Columbia
Yankee Pasha	Joseph Pevney	Rhonda Fleming, Jeff Chandler, Mamie Van Doren	Adventure	Universal
The Yellow Mountain	Jesse Hibbs	Lex Barker, Mala Powers, Howard Duff	Western	Universal
The Yellow Tomahawk	Lesley Selander	Rory Calhoun, Peggie Castle, Warner Anderson	Western	United Artists
Young at Heart	Gordon Douglas	Doris Day, Frank Sinatra, Gig Young	Musical, Drama	Warner Bros.
Yukon Vengeance	William Beaudine	Kirby Grant, Mary Ellen Kay, Monte Hale	Adventure	Allied Artists

== Documentaries ==
Title	Director	Cast	Genre	Notes
The Vanishing Prairie	James Algar		Documentary	Academy Award winner

== Serials ==
Title	Director	Cast	Genre	Notes
Gunfighters of the Northwest	Spencer Bennet	Jock Mahoney, Phyllis Coates	Western	Columbia
Man with the Steel Whip	Franklin Adreon	Dick Simmons, Dale Van Sickel	Western	Republic
Trader Tom of the China Seas	Franklin Adreon	Harry Lauter, Lyle Talbot	Serial	

== Shorts ==
Title	Director	Cast	Genre	Notes
Inauguration of the Pleasure Dome	Kenneth Anger	Anaïs Nin	Drama	38-minute film

== See also ==
- 1954 in the United States
