= The Killer Is Loose =

1956 American film by Budd Boetticher

- Theatrical release poster
- Directed by: Budd Boetticher
- Screenplay by: Harold Medford
- Based on: The Killer Is Loose by: John Hawkins; Ward Hawkins
- Produced by: Robert L. Jacks
- Starring: Joseph Cotten; Rhonda Fleming; Wendell Corey
- Cinematography: Lucien Ballard
- Edited by: George A. Gittens
- Music by: Lionel Newman
- Production company: Crown Productions
- Distributed by: United Artists
- Release date: February 6, 1956
- Running time: 73 minutes
- Country: United States
- Language: English

The Killer Is Loose is a 1956 American crime film directed by Budd Boetticher and starring Joseph Cotten, Rhonda Fleming and Wendell Corey. An independent production, it was released by United Artists. It is based on a 1953 novelette published in The Saturday Evening Post, written by John and Ward Hawkins.

== Plot ==
A savings and loan company is robbed by men displaying abnormal familiarity with the building. Police inquiries led by Lt. Sam Wagner discern that soft-spoken bank employee Leon Poole is complicit in the crime. Poole starts a gunfight when the police appear at his apartment, but surrenders after Sam accidentally shoots and kills Poole's wife (whom the police officers are told by the neighbours is not in the apartment, and whose presence Poole does not announce). She was, in Poole's words, the only person who respected him and made his life worth living. The teller is sentenced to a decade in prison for his part in the robbery, promising that someday he will have revenge on Wagner.

Two years later, Sam has switched to a desk job at the behest of his wife Lila, who has feared his being killed on duty ever since she heard Poole threaten him. Poole, meanwhile, has been transferred to the prison's honor farm for good behavior. But his mild demeanor was a deception; at the first opportunity he kills a guard and escapes. By the time the authorities discover his absence, Poole has also murdered a farmer, stolen his victim's truck and clothing, and driven towards the city where the Wagners live. He successfully passes through roadblocks and police patrols, having realized that nobody recognizes him when he takes off his distinctive glasses, needed for his extreme short-sightedness. Sam is asked to resume active duty and help with the case. Lila worries about him, but he tries to minimize the danger.

Interviews with Poole's former cellmates make it clear that he is still obsessed with revenge, and that he plans to make Sam suffer by killing Lila. Sam sends Lila into hiding in the home of a police colleague but to prevent her worrying, does not explain why; she assumes he is using himself as bait to bring Poole into the open. She accuses Sam of preferring his job to her and threatens to leave him. He does not take the threat seriously and returns home, which has been made into a trap for Poole.

Needing food and rest, Poole breaks into the home of his former army sergeant, Otto Flanders. While claiming he doesn't wish to harm her, he terrorises Flanders' wife until her husband comes home. Accustomed to bullying Poole during their military years, Flanders tries to intimidate the convict into surrendering. Poole kills him in cold blood, then leaves with a raincoat stolen from Flanders' wife.

Exasperated after an interval of hiding, Lila decides to leave but Sam's colleague's wife finally tells her about Poole's real intentions, adding that all policemen's families face emotional strain and Lila is not taking it as bravely as she should.

Ashamed, Lila leaves the hideout and heads home, wanting to reconcile with Sam whatever the risk. As she approaches her house, Poole begins following her, disguised in the stolen raincoat, with trousers rolled up to look from a distance like a woman. Keeping her wits, she leads him into the police ambush and he is shot down. Sam and Lila embrace as the police gather around Poole's corpse.

== Cast ==
- Joseph Cotten as Detective Sergeant Sam Wagner
- Rhonda Fleming as Lila Wagner
- Wendell Corey as Leon 'Foggy' Poole
- Alan Hale Jr. as Denny, Detective (credited as Alan Hale)
- Michael Pate as Det. Chris Gillespie
- John Larch as Otto Flanders
- Dee J. Thompson as Grace Flanders
- John Beradino as Mac, plainclothes cop
- Virginia Christine as Mary Gillespie
- Paul Bryar as Greg Boyd

== Production ==
Budd Boetticher made the film with Lucien Ballard, who he called "the best cinematographer there ever was". They had made The Magnificent Matador (1955) and, Boetticher said, "when we got through with that, all the producers said, 'don't let these two guys make a picture together ever again; they're tough as Hell; they don't care about the money; they're going to break the studio.' I discovered that there was an eighteen-day picture called The Killer Is Loose at Warner Brothers, so Lucien and I went there and we made it in fifteen days. And that put that rumor to rest. Joseph Cotten was the star, a complete professional, always knew his lines."

== Critical reaction ==
The Monthly Film Bulletin wrote: "Manufactured to formula, both in its main plot and the domestic side-issues, this thriller fails to crown its build-up with a sufficiently suspenseful climax. Somehow it all falls rather flat, though Wendell Corey's performance goes some way towards rescuing the film from banality."

The New York Times film critic, Bosley Crowther, found nothing original about the film, calling the lead actors (Cotten and Corey) "first rate" and the crime film "third rate."

Critic Dennis Schwartz wrote, "A typical 1950s noir, distinguished by its rapid pace and taut script, that delves mainly into the character of the villain—making him out to be someone who went over-the-edge when he couldn't take being ridiculed as a failure, anymore ...The suburban atmosphere and the no-nonsense style of telling the story add to the blandness of the story and the failure to elicit anything out of the ordinary to the build-up of the suspense that comes with the climax. The result is a watchable film which could be seen for the sense of nostalgia of the 1950s it evokes, a time when it was more receptive for noir to work as well as it does."
