= White Feather (film) =

1955 film by Robert D. Webb

- Theatrical release poster
- Directed by: Robert D. Webb
- Screenplay by: Delmer Daves; Leo Townsend
- Based on: My Great-Aunt Appearing Day; 1952 story in Lilliput magazine by John Prebble
- Produced by: Robert L. Jacks
- Starring: Robert Wagner; Jeffrey Hunter; John Lund; Debra Paget
- Cinematography: Lucien Ballard
- Edited by: George A. Gittens
- Music by: Hugo Friedhofer
- Color process: Technicolor
- Production company: Panoramic Pictures
- Distributed by: Twentieth Century Fox
- Release date: February 16, 1955
- Running time: 102 minutes
- Country: United States
- Language: English
- Budget: $1.125 million
- Box office: $1.65 million (US rentals)

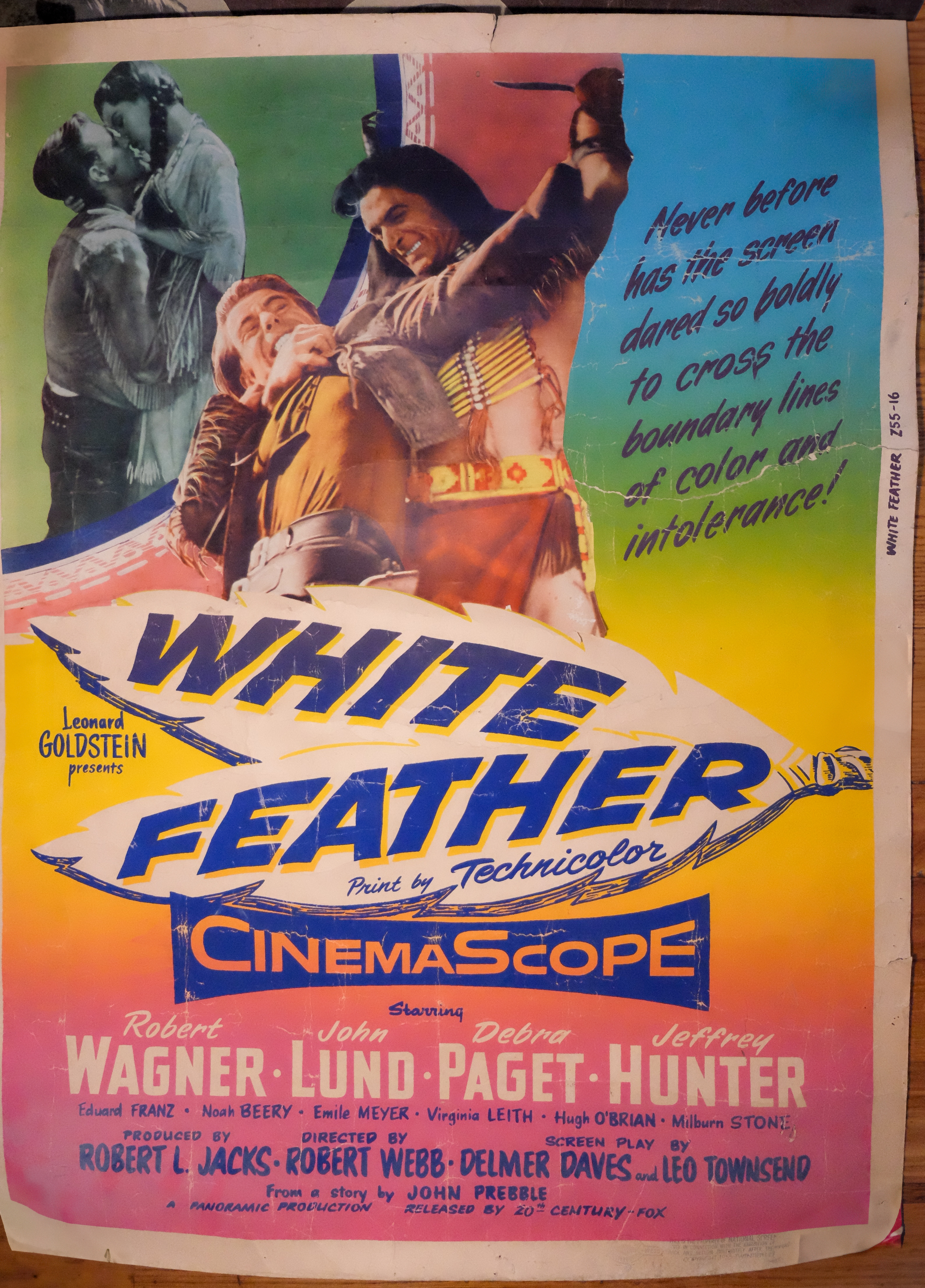

White Feather is a 1955 American CinemaScope Western film directed by Robert D. Webb and starring Robert Wagner. The movie was filmed in Durango, Mexico. The story is based on fact; however, the particulars of the plot and the characters of the story are fictional. (Note: For instance, Josh Tanner's real name was Charles Petley, while Appearing Day is elsewhere called Dawn.)

== Plot ==
The story of the peace mission from the U.S. cavalry to the Cheyenne Indians in Wyoming during the 1870s. The Cheyenne agree to leave their hunting grounds so that white settlers can move in to search for gold. Colonel Lindsay and land surveyor Josh Tanner are in charge of the resettlement, but the mission is threatened when Appearing Day, the sister of Little Dog and fiancée of Cheyenne tribesman American Horse, falls for Tanner.

When Appearing Day runs away to join Tanner at the fort, American Horse follows, seeking to kill him. He is captured, but later freed by Little Dog and the two ride off to the hills. Tanner, Col. Lindsay and a troop of soldiers go to the Cheyenne camp where Chief Broken Hand has agreed to sign a peace treaty. After the signing, a warrior rides up and throws down a knife with a white feather attached, a declaration of war by American Horse and Little Dog against all the soldiers. Tanner convinces the Chief to allow the matter to be resolved between themselves. Col. Lindsay calls out the full complement of cavalry. Appearing Day and Ann leave the fort to try and prevent more deaths. Col. Lindsay and the cavalry look for Little Dog and American Horse, preparing to fight with them. The Cheyenne gather on their side of the river. Lt. Ferguson takes troops to bring in Little Dog and American Horse but is told to not fire any shots. Col. Lindsay has the recall sounded and the troops return. Tanner goes out to speak with them. He asks Little Dog not to die and dishonour his father by breaking the treaty. Tanner offers to fight both of them but it will be one against two. Tanner tries to goad them into firing the first shot. Chief Broken Hand fires the first shot and kills American Horse, as he has shamed them. Appearing Day arrives and asks her brother to trust Tanner. Little Dog charges and is killed by the cavalry. Tanner goes to his body and shows his respect for him by placing the reins of his horse in his hand. Tanner tells the colonel that Appearing Day will be his wife. The Cheyenne return to their village.

== Cast ==
- Robert Wagner as Josh Tanner
- Debra Paget as Appearing Day
- John Lund as Col. Lindsay
- Jeffrey Hunter as Little Dog
- Eduard Franz as Chief Broken Hand
- Noah Beery Jr. as Lt. Ferguson
- Virginia Leith as Ann Magruder
- Emile Meyer as Magruder
- Hugh O'Brian as American Horse
- Milburn Stone as Commissioner Trenton
- Iron Eyes Cody as Indian Chief

== Production ==
The film was based on the magazine story My Great Aunt Appearing Day by John Prebble which concerns a Native American woman who marries a British major.

Film rights were purchased by Panoramic Productions, a company under Leonard Goldstein, who had a ten-picture deal with 20th Century Fox. Delmer Daves did the original script. It was the last of Panoramic's ten-picture deal (replacing another intended project, Hawk of the Desert) before they left to set up at United Artists, and their first in CinemaScope. Robert Webb was assigned to direct and Robert Jacks (vice president at Panoramic) to produce. The lead cast originally announced in June 1954 were all Fox contractees – Robert Wagner, Jeffrey Hunter, Terry Moore, Dale Robertson and Rita Moreno.

Moreno was replaced by Debra Paget. Moore and Robertson would not appear in the final film.

Filming began in July 1954 in Durango, Mexico. It was the first Hollywood movie shot in Durango, which would become a regular location for Hollywood films, especially Westerns.

Early into the shoot, Goldstein died unexpectedly.

== Reception ==
The film was a moderate box-office success earning North American rentals of $1,650,000.

== See also ==
- List of American films of 1955
