= Find a Place to Die =

1968 film

- Directed by: Giuliano Carnimeo; Hugo Fregonese
- Written by: Lamberto Benvenuti; Giuliano Carnimeo; Hugo Fregonese
- Produced by: Hugo Fregonese
- Starring: Jeffrey Hunter; Daniela Giordano; Pascale Petit
- Cinematography: Riccardo Pallottini
- Music by: Gianni Ferrio
- Distributed by: Variety Distribution
- Release date: 1968
- Country: Italy
- Language: Italian

Find a Place to Die (aka Joe... cercati un posto per morire!) is a 1968 Spaghetti Western film starring Jeffrey Hunter and Pascale Petit. It was co-written and directed by Giuliano Carnimeo (credited as Anthony Ascott) with sequences directed by Hugo Fregonese who also produced the film.

== Story ==
A remake of 1954's Garden of Evil. A beautiful woman recruits five men to help save her husband trapped in their gold mine menaced by a vicious gang of bandits led by Chato. One of the five men is a member of the gang, another sells weapons to Chato. They are joined by a man professing to be a pastor. All of the party want the gold and the woman for themselves.

== Cast ==
- Jeffrey Hunter as Joe Collins
- Pascale Petit as Lisa Martin
- Piero Lulli (Peter Lull) as Paul Martin
- Reza Fazeli as Paco
- Daniela Giordano as Juanita
- Adolfo Lastretti (Peter Lastrett) as Reverend Riley
- Giovanni Pallavicino (Gordon York) as Gomez
- Giovanni Pazzafini (Ted Carter) as Fernando
- Mario Darndanelli (Mario Darnell) as Chato
- Seraphino Profuno as Miguel
- Anthony Blond as Bobo
- Umberto Di Grazia as bandit
- Pietro Ceccarelli

== Production ==
Hunter had a financial interest in the picture, and controlled its initial distribution in the United States.
