= Cleopatra's Daughter (film) =

1960 film

- Directed by: Fernando Cerchio
- Screenplay by: Damiano Damiani; Fernando Cerchio
- Starring: Debra Paget; Ettore Manni; Erno Crisa
- Cinematography: Anchise Brizzi
- Edited by: Antonietta Zita
- Music by: Giovanni Fusco
- Production companies: Explorer Film '58; Comptoir Francais du Productions
- Distributed by: Variety Distribution
- Release date: 7 December 1960 (Italy)
- Running time: 109 minutes
- Countries: Italy; France
- Language: Italian

Cleopatra's Daughter (Italian: Il sepolcro dei re) is a 1960 historical drama film set in Egypt during the reign of the pharaoh Khufu (r. 2589-2566 BC). The film stars Debra Paget and was directed by Fernando Cerchio. For some reason, the English version was translated very differently from the original Italian script, setting the film in the 1st century BC, rather than the early Bronze Age.

== Plot ==
After the death of Antony and Cleopatra, Egypt is ruled by the young tyrant Pharaoh Nemorat and his mother Tegi. Cleopatra has left a surviving daughter, Shila, raised by the king and queen of Assyria. When Nemorat conquers Assyria, Shila is brought to the Egyptian court and, at the instigation of Nemorat's mother, marries him. The pharaoh, who is a mentally disturbed hypochondriac, has a good and wise physician, Resi, who falls in love with Shila and encourages her to go on living despite the killing of her Assyrian surrogate parents by Tegi.

When Shila spurns an amorous Nemorat one evening, he goes into a violent rage causing him to faint. He is then poisoned by his ambitious chief overseer Kefren and his mistress. Shila is convicted of the murder and sentenced to be buried alive with Nemorat. Resi comes up with a plan to save Shila by having her take a drug, which causes her to lapse into a temporary coma, while he bribes the chief of the "house of death" to allow him to take Shila away in the middle of the night. The chief of the house of death proves treacherous, but in a struggle with Resi he is killed. Resi is seriously wounded and is rescued and tended by his faithful servant, but he does not recover before Shila is entombed with Pharaoh Nemorat.

The common people, who have benefited from Resi's care, help him in capturing the royal architect, who helps Resi and his associates, greedy tomb robbers, break into Nemorat's tomb. Shila is saved and she rides off with Resi to freedom, while Kefren is killed when Tegi finds out that it was he who poisoned Nemorat.

== Cast ==
- Debra Paget as Shila
- Ettore Manni as Resi
- Erno Crisa as Kefren
- Corrado Pani as Nemorat
- Yvette Lebon as Tegi
- Robert Alda as Inuni
- Rosalba Neri

== Release ==
Cleopatra's Daughter was released in Italy on 7 December 1960.

== See also ==
- List of historical drama films
