= The River's Edge =

1957 film by Allan Dwan

- Original movie poster
- Directed by: Allan Dwan
- Screenplay by: James Leicester; Harold Jacob Smith
- Based on: The Highest Mountain by Harold Jacob Smith
- Produced by: Benedict Bogeaus
- Starring: Ray Milland; Anthony Quinn; Debra Paget
- Cinematography: Harold Lipstein
- Edited by: James Leicester
- Music by: Louis Forbes
- Color process: Color by DeLuxe
- Production company: Benedict Bogeaus Productions
- Distributed by: 20th Century Fox
- Release date: April 11, 1957
- Running time: 87 minutes
- Country: United States
- Language: English

The River's Edge is a 1957 American film noir adventure, crime, and drama DeLuxe CinemaScope film directed by Allan Dwan and starring Ray Milland, Anthony Quinn and Debra Paget. The picture is based on the unpublished short story "The Higher Mountain" by Harold Jacob Smith. Location filming was done in Amecameca and Iztaccihuatl in Mexico. The supporting cast features Harry Carey, Jr. and Chubby Johnson.

== Plot ==
Ben Cameron is a struggling New Mexico rancher who is devoted to his wife Meg. They married while she was on parole for a ten-year prison sentence. Meg has not adjusted to ranch life and she still loves her former partner in crime, Nardo Denning, who abandoned her after her arrest.

After an argument with Ben, Meg prepares to leave him. Denning arrives and wants Ben to help him cross the border to Mexico. Ben refuses, and Denning and Meg leave for town. Ben finds a photograph of Denning and realizes that he and Meg were lovers.

Denning apologizes for deserting Meg and reveals that he has $1 million in cash from a recent job. While driving, they are stopped by a police officer who looks into the trunk. Denning backs over him several times. Hysterical, Meg runs from the car and Denning drives towards her before crashing into a boulder. He tells her he backed over the officer by accident.

Ben returns to the ranch, where he finds Denning and Meg. Ben wants her to go to the police, but Meg refuses because they will find out she violated her parole. Denning eventually agrees to give Ben $10,000 for escorting him and Meg over the border.

After Denning kills a friend of Ben's, Meg realizes that he is a coldblooded killer. During an attempt to escape him, she cuts her arm on a barbed wire fence. She tells Ben she no longer loves Denning.

Later, Meg collapses due to her infected injury. They shelter in a cave, where Ben starts a fire with his $10,000 to boil water for her injured arm. He tells her he would wait forever for her if she went back to jail. The next morning, Denning and Ben fight, resulting in Ben being pinned under a boulder. He gives Denning a choice of paths: to an airport or to a village that will send help for him and Meg.

That night, Denning is knocked into a gorge while trying to stop a truck. Ben and Meg find the money and Denning's broken body, discovering that he was going for help. They bury him and return home to face the consequences of the past few days.

== Cast ==
- Ray Milland as Nardo Denning
- Anthony Quinn as Ben Cameron
- Debra Paget as Meg Cameron
- Harry Carey, Jr. as Chet
- Chubby Johnson as Whiskers
- Byron Foulger as Barry
- Tom McKee as U.S. Border Patrol Captain
- Frank Gerstle as Harry Castleton

== See also ==
- List of American films of 1957
