= Seven Angry Men =

1955 film by Charles Marquis Warren

- Directed by: Charles Marquis Warren
- Written by: Daniel B. Ullman
- Produced by: Vincent M. Fennelly; Walter Mirisch
- Starring: Raymond Massey; Debra Paget; Jeffrey Hunter; Larry Pennell
- Cinematography: Ellsworth Fredericks
- Edited by: Richard C. Meyer
- Music by: Carl Brandt
- Production company: Allied Artists Pictures Corporation
- Distributed by: Allied Artists Pictures Corporation
- Release date: March 27, 1955
- Running time: 92 minutes
- Country: United States
- Language: English

Seven Angry Men is a 1955 American Western film directed by Charles Marquis Warren and starring Raymond Massey, Debra Paget and Jeffrey Hunter.

It is about the abolitionist John Brown, particularly his involvement in Bleeding Kansas and his leadership of the Raid on Harpers Ferry. The title refers to Brown and his six sons.

== Plot ==
John Brown is a 19th-century abolitionist. After cutting a bloody swath through Kansas, Brown and his followers take refuge in a warehouse at Harper's Ferry, Virginia, where he meets his own personal Waterloo at the hands of federal troops.

== Cast ==
- Raymond Massey as John Brown
- Debra Paget as Elizabeth Clark
- Jeffrey Hunter as Owen Brown
- Larry Pennell as Oliver Brown
- Leo Gordon as Martin White
- John Smith as Frederick Brown
- James Best as Jason Brown
- Dennis Weaver as John Brown Jr.
- Guy Williams as Salmon Brown
- Tom Irish as Watson Brown
- James Anderson as Henry Thompson
- James Edwards as Ned Green
- John Pickard as George Wilson
- Smoki Whitfield as Newby
- Jack Lomas as Doyle
- Robert Simon as Lewis Washington
- Richard H. Cutting as Maj. Beckham (uncredited)
- Lester Dorr as Henry David Thoreau (uncredited)
- Selmer Jackson as Ralph Waldo Emerson (uncredited)
- John Lupton as J.E.B. Stuart (uncredited)
- Robert Osterloh as Robert E. Lee (uncredited)
- Carleton Young as Judge (uncredited)

== Production ==
Raymond Massey had previously played Brown in Santa Fe Trail (1940) and appeared on stage in John Brown's Body.

The planned film was known as John Brown's Raiders. In July 1954 Walter Mirisch announced the film would be one of 15 Allied Artists would make over the next 6 months. The same month the studio announced that Massey would play Brown.

Hunter and Paget were borrowed from 20th Century Fox. Filming started in September 1954.

== Reception ==
The New York Times critic called it a "competent if hardly inspired Allied Artists presentation".

== See also ==
- List of American films of 1955
- List of films featuring slavery
