= Why Must I Die? =

1960 film

- Film poster
- Directed by: Roy Del Ruth
- Screenplay by: Richard Bernstein; George W. Waters
- Story by: George W. Waters
- Produced by: Richard Bernstein
- Starring: Terry Moore; Debra Paget
- Cinematography: Ernest Haller
- Edited by: John Hoffman
- Music by: Richard LaSalle
- Production company: Viscount Films
- Distributed by: American International Pictures
- Release date: June 1960
- Running time: 86 minutes
- Country: United States
- Language: English

Why Must I Die? is a 1960 American crime drama film directed by Roy Del Ruth and starring Terry Moore and Debra Paget. It was released by American International Pictures as a double feature with The Jailbreakers. This was Del Ruth's final film.

== Plot ==
Lois King keeps her troubled past from nightclub owner Kenny Randall, who hires her to sing at his club, The Cockatoo, and has fallen in love with her.

Lois is blackmailed by Eddie, the ex-partner of her father, Red, who is in prison. Eddie and a female safecracker, Dottie Manson, will see to it that Red's sentence is extended to life unless Lois helps them rob the nightclub.

Kenny accidentally comes across the burglars and is killed. Lois finds his body and is arrested and falsely convicted for his murder.

Lois is on death row when Dottie is brought to the prison. By the time other inmates can convince Dottie to confess to killing Kenny, the execution has been carried out.

== Cast ==
- Terry Moore as Lois King
- Debra Paget as Dottie Manson
- Bert Freed as Adler
- Juli Reding as Mitzi
- Lionel Ames as Eddie Rainey
- Robert Shayne as Charlie Munro
