= George A. Gittens =

American film editor (1909–1974)

- Born: January 16, 1909; New Orleans, Louisiana, U.S.
- Died: September 19, 1974 (aged 65); Los Angeles County, California, U.S.
- Occupation: Film editor
- Years active: 1952–1971

George A. Gittens (January 16, 1909 – September 19, 1974) was an American film editor. He was a member of the American Cinema Editors. Gittens was buried in Forest Lawn Memorial Park.

== Selected filmography ==
- Don't Bother to Knock (1952)
- Bloodhounds of Broadway (1952)
- The Silver Whip (1953)
- City of Bad Men (1953)
- Gorilla at Large (1954)
- Princess of the Nile (1954)
- White Feather (1955)
- Robbers' Roost (1955)
- A Life in the Balance (1955)
- The Killer Is Loose (1956)
- A Kiss Before Dying (1956)
- Nightmare (1956)
- Hot Cars (1956)
- Pharaoh's Curse (1957)
- Bailout at 43,000 (1957)
- Appointment with a Shadow (1957)
- Voice in the Mirror (1958)
- Kathy O' (1958)
- The Monster of Piedras Blancas (1959)
- Curse of the Undead (1959)
- The Wild and the Innocent (1959)
- Town Tamer (1965)
- The Legend of Custer (1968)
