= The Gambler from Natchez =

1954 film by Henry Levin

- Theatrical release poster
- Directed by: Henry Levin
- Screenplay by: Gerald Drayson Adams; Irving Wallace
- Story by: Gerald Drayson Adams
- Produced by: Leonard Goldstein
- Starring: Dale Robertson; Debra Paget
- Cinematography: Lloyd Ahern
- Edited by: William B. Murphy
- Music by: Lionel Newman
- Color process: Technicolor
- Production company: Panoramic Productions
- Distributed by: 20th Century Fox
- Release date: August 4, 1954
- Running time: 88 minutes
- Country: United States
- Language: English

The Gambler from Natchez is a 1954 American Western film directed by Henry Levin and starring Dale Robertson and Debra Paget. It was Robertson's favorite among his own films.

== Plot ==
In 1848, after four years away from New Orleans, Vance Colby is summoned by his gambler father. On a riverboat, a gambler named Gottfried accuses him of cheating. Vance beats him into submission, but when Vance's back is turned, Gottfried comes after him with a baling hook. Riverboat captain Barbee's attractive daughter Melanie intervenes to save Vance.

Ashore, Vance comes to the aid of Ivette Rivage when her carriage's horse goes lame. At her family plantation, Araby, he meets her brother André and fiancé Claude St. Germaine, who become noticeably less friendly when they learn that he is Chip Colby's son. After Vance departs, André sends his henchman Etienne and two others to ambush him. Etienne throws a knife that pierces Vance's side, but he manages to shoot Etienne in the arm and escape in a small boat. He is spotted by Melanie, and his wound is treated by Barbee after Josh pulls the knife carefully out. Barbee informs Vance that his father once saved Barbee from losing his riverboat to a card sharp.

When Vance goes to see his father, he finds a coffin. He learns from Police Commissioner Renard that the elder Colby was accused of cheating and shot by Rivage. Rivage's claim is backed by casino owner Nicholas Cadiz and a waiter named René Garonne. Vance writes the three names on a three of spades playing card. Vance abducts Cadiz' waiter Garonne and pressures him into telling the truth. Chip Colby and Rivage were playing 21 in a private room at Cadiz's establishment. Rivage lost his brand new riverboat, the Baton Rouge, to Colby, then insisted on one more hand, wagering Araby against the Baton Rouge. After he lost, he became enraged and shot Colby. Cadiz then placed a marked deck in the dead man's hand. Garonne also reveals that Rivage, St. Germaine, Cadiz, and Colby were partners in the riverboat. However, Garonne is taken in the middle of the night, leaving Colby with no proof.

Vance's enemies try to frame him by planting Garonne's body in his hotel room, but St. Germaine is caught in the act. With Vance in pursuit, St. Germaine falls to his death.

Vance then has Barbee pose as a fabulously wealthy owner of a coffee plantation in order to gamble at Cadiz's casino. When Barbee begins to win, Cadiz sends a ringer to the table who gives a code phrase to the dealer to switch to marked cards. Barbee spots the marked cards, so he gives the prearranged signal to Vance who then brings Commissioner Renard to Barbee's table. Vance proceeds to prove that Cadiz is cheating his patrons. Renard revokes Cadiz's license. Cadiz strikes Vance in the face, which leads to a duel. Before the pistol duel, Vance gets Cadiz to bet his stake in the Baton Rouge against Vance's inheritance of $50,000. Cadiz fires, but only nicks Vance's cheek. Vance holds his fire, offering to spare Cadiz if he will confess what really happened to Vance's father. Cadiz agrees, but then draws a derringer, and Vance kills him.

When Rivage's final scheme fails, which involves sending his sister to Vance's room in order to compromise him, he challenges Vance to one hand of 21, each wagering their half share of the Baton Rouge. When Vance wins, Rivage once again bets Araby against the riverboat. He loses again by drawing a three of spades and going over 21, just as he did against Vance's father. He then draws his cane sword and attacks the unarmed Vance. Melanie throws Vance a sword, and a prolonged duel ensues. Etienne waits to throw his knife, but Josh deals with him. Then Vance kills Rivage.

Afterward, Vance returns the estate's deed to a grateful Ivette. She invites him to stay with her, but he has other plans, which include Melanie.

== Cast ==
- Dale Robertson as Vance Colby
- Debra Paget as Melanie Barbee
- Thomas Gomez as Captain Antoine Barbee
- Lisa Daniels as Ivette Rivage
- Kevin McCarthy as André Rivage
- Douglas Dick as Claude St. Germaine
- John Wengraf as Nicholas Cadiz
- Donald Randolph as Pierre Bonet
- Henri Letondal as Police Commissioner Robert Renard
- Jay Novello as René Garonne
- Woody Strode as Josh

== See also ==
- List of American films of 1954
