= Three Young Texans =

1954 film by Henry Levin

- Directed by: Henry Levin
- Screenplay by: Gerald Drayson Adams
- Story by: William MacLeod Raine
- Produced by: Leonard Goldstein
- Starring: Mitzi Gaynor; Keefe Brasselle; Jeffrey Hunter
- Cinematography: Harold Lipstein
- Edited by: William B. Murphy
- Color process: Technicolor
- Production company: Panoramic Productions
- Distributed by: 20th Century-Fox
- Release date: January 16, 1954
- Running time: 78 minutes
- Country: United States
- Language: English
- Budget: $505,000

Three Young Texans is a 1954 American Western film directed by Henry Levin and starring Mitzi Gaynor, Keefe Brasselle and Jeffrey Hunter.

== Plot ==
A couple of cowboys, Johnny Colt and Tony Ballew, both have a romantic interest in tomboy Rusty Blair while working for her father. Tony loses his wages gambling, then borrows money from Johnny and wins $700, which they intend to put toward a ranch of their own.

Johnny's nervous because his father Jim is also a gambler. Jim goes to Mexico, gets drunk, catches a man named McAdoo cheating at cards, then shoots him in self-defense. McAdoo's two associates, Catur and Joe, decide to blackmail Jim into helping them rob a train of its $50,000 in payroll loot. If he refuses, they'll tell the law Jim shot their friend in cold blood.

To help his father, Johnny robs the train first. He hides the money with the $700. A posse is formed, which Johnny joins to go search for a thief who is actually himself.

McAdoo turns out to have been wounded, not killed. He turns up and Tony is shot in the back. McAdoo and Catur are done away with in a gunfight, and when Joe flees on horseback from Johnny, he falls to his death over a cliff. Johnny returns the robbery money, then ends up with a $10,000 reward and Rusty to boot.

== Cast ==
- Mitzi Gaynor as Rusty Blair
- Keefe Brasselle as Tony Ballew
- Jeffrey Hunter as Johnny Colt
- Harvey Stephens as Jim Colt
- Dan Riss as Sheriff Carter
- Michael Ansara as Apache Joe
- Aaron Spelling as Catur
- Morris Ankrum as Jeff Blair
- Frank Wilcox as Bill McAdoo
- Helen Wallace as Martha Colt

== Production ==
The film was made by Panoramic Pictures, a company of producer Leonard Goldstein, who signed a ten picture deal with 20th Century Fox.
