= Princess of the Nile =

1954 film by Harmon Jones

- Directed by: Harmon Jones
- Written by: Gerald Drayson Adams
- Produced by: Robert L. Jacks
- Starring: Debra Paget; Jeffrey Hunter; Michael Rennie
- Cinematography: Lloyd Ahern
- Edited by: George A. Gittens
- Music by: Lionel Newman
- Color process: Technicolor
- Production company: Panoramic Productions
- Distributed by: 20th Century Fox
- Release date: June 11, 1954 (New York)
- Running time: 71 minutes
- Country: United States
- Language: English
- Budget: $475,000

Princess of the Nile is a 1954 American adventure film directed by Harmon Jones and starring Debra Paget, Jeffrey Hunter and Michael Rennie. It was shot in Technicolor and distributed by Twentieth Century-Fox. Originally conceived as a more lavish film, it was ultimately produced as a second feature.

== Plot ==
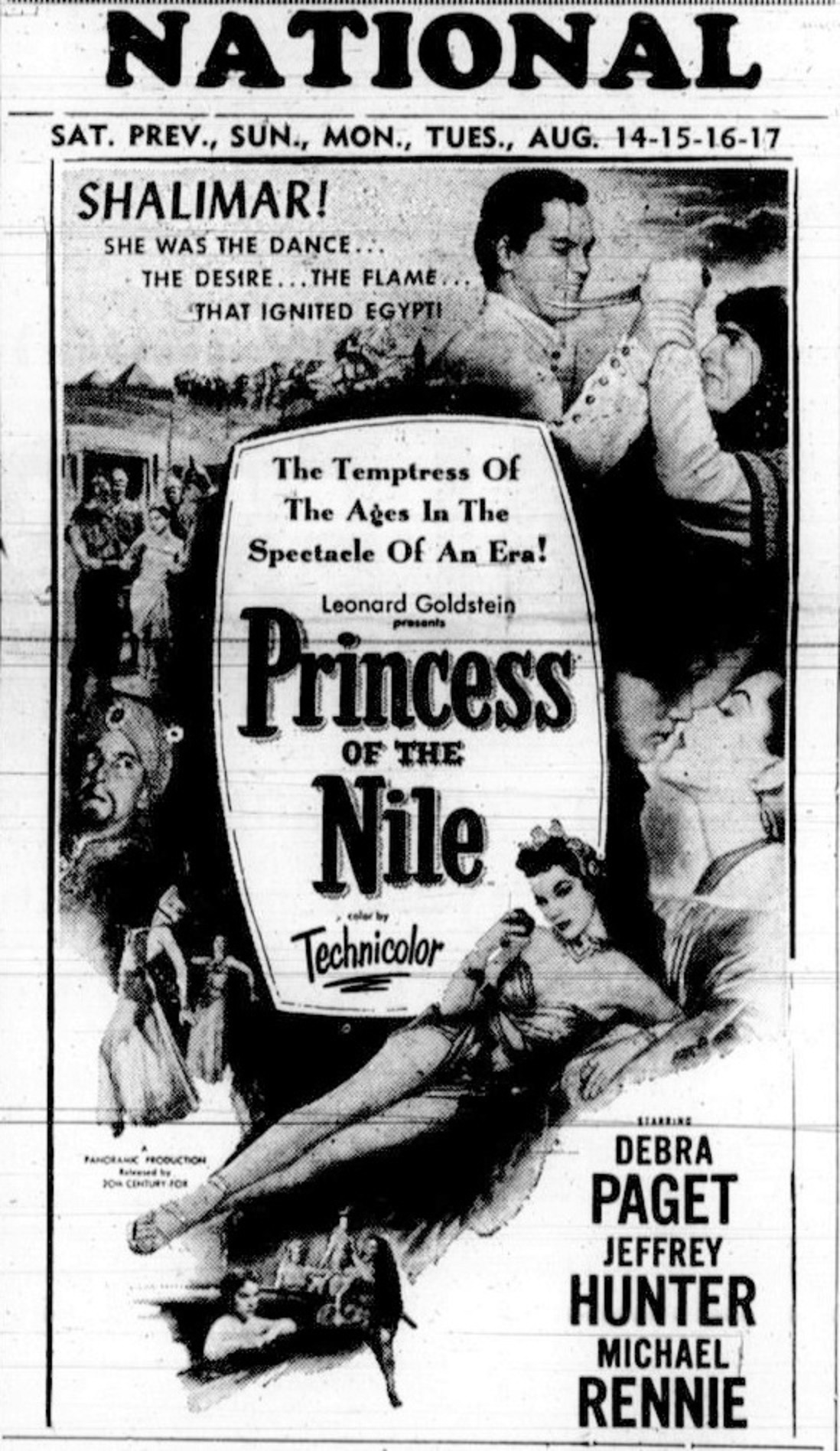
Advertisement from 1954

In Egypt in 1249, the father of Princess Shalimar has fallen under the spell of the sinister Shaman, who drugs him and tries to keep his daughter Shalimar as a prisoner. She knows a secret passage and escapes at night to entertain the oppressed villagers of Hanwan by disguising herself as Taura, a popular dancer at the Tambourine Tavern.

Prince Haidi, the son of the caliph of Bagdad, rides into town accompanied by his close friend Captain Hussein. At the same time, the menacing Rama Khan and his powerful army arrive. Rama Khan is conspiring with the Shaman to overthrow the Hanwan rulers.

Hussein is killed by Khan, and in the confusion, Taura stabs Prince Haidi with a dagger, unaware that he is a potential ally. However, Haidi's wounds are not fatal. As he consults Princess Shalimar's father about how to conquer the invading horde, he inquires about Taura, unaware that she and Shalimar are the same.

Rama Khan wants the princess for himself. He threatens to kill villagers unless she gives herself to him. A battle ensues in which Haidi, who now realizes her true identity, overcomes Khan, and Shaman is killed.

== Cast ==
- Debra Paget as Princess Shalimar / Taura
- Jeffrey Hunter as Prince Haidi
- Michael Rennie as Rama Khan
- Dona Drake as Mirva
- Michael Ansara as Captain Kral
- Edgar Barrier as Shaman
- Wally Cassell as Goghi
- Jack Elam as Basra
- Lisa Daniels as Handmaiden
- Phyllis Winger as Handmaiden
- Merry Anders as Handmaiden
- Honey Bruce Harlow as Handmaiden (as Honey Harlow)
- Suzanne Alexander as Handmaiden
- Genice Grayson as Handmaiden
- Cheryll Clarke as Handmaiden
- Kitty London as Handmaiden
- Bobette Bentley as Handmaiden

== Production ==
In January 1953, Fox announced that the film would be shot in CinemaScope as a vehicle for Marilyn Monroe. The studio hoped to recruit Tyrone Power to play the male lead. However, the film became a cheaper production with lesser stars.

== Reception ==
In a contemporary review for The New York Times, critic Howard Thompson wrote: "[T]his stale, laborious mixture of muscularity, exotic trappings and undulating background cuties can't easily be excused as passable, lightweight entertainment. Certainly not when three such performers as lovely Debra Paget, the curiously neglected young Jeffrey Hunter and reliable Michael Rennie are embarrassingly wasted. The only diversion, indeed, is the sight of this trio valiantly trying to remain above the waterline, figuratively and literally."
