= Garden of Evil =

1954 film by Henry Hathaway

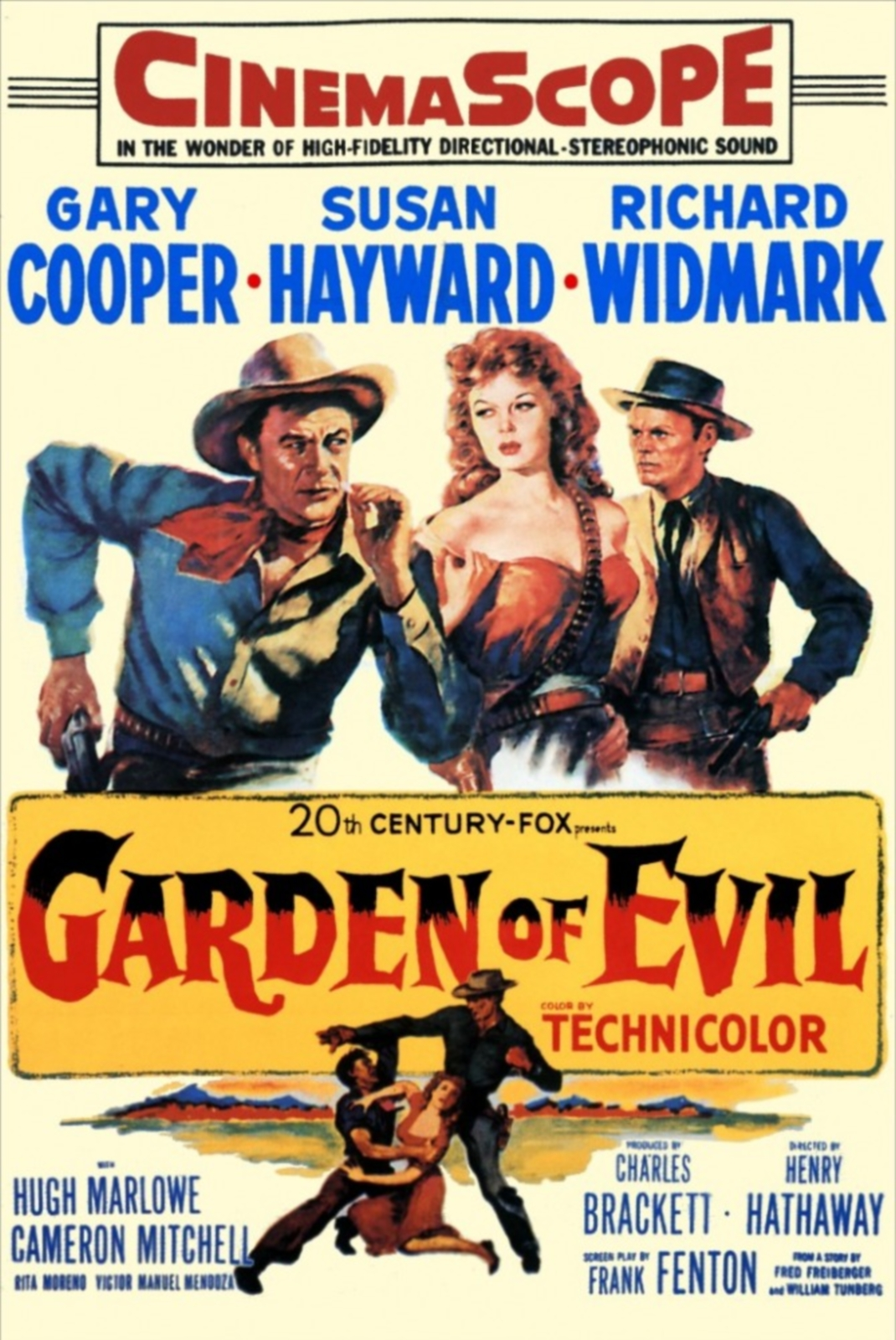
- Directed by: Henry Hathaway
- Screenplay by: Frank Fenton
- Story by: Fred Freiberger; William Tunberg
- Produced by: Charles Brackett
- Starring: Gary Cooper; Susan Hayward; Richard Widmark
- Cinematography: Milton R. Krasner; Jorge Stahl, Jr.
- Edited by: James B. Clark
- Music by: Bernard Herrmann
- Color process: Technicolor
- Production company: 20th Century Fox
- Distributed by: 20th Century Fox
- Release date: July 9, 1954
- Running time: 100 minutes
- Country: United States
- Language: English
- Budget: $2,070,000 or $2.5 million
- Box office: $3.1 million (US rentals) or $3.4 million

Garden of Evil is a 1954 American CinemaScope Western film directed by Henry Hathaway about three somewhat disreputable 19th-century soldiers of fortune, played by Gary Cooper as an ex-lawman, Richard Widmark as a gambler, and Cameron Mitchell as a bounty hunter, who, along with Vicente, played by Víctor Manuel Mendoza, are hired by a woman (Susan Hayward) to rescue her husband (Hugh Marlowe), who is trapped in a collapsed mine. Rita Moreno appears at the beginning of the film as a Mexican cantina singer/dancer. Director Hathaway took special pains to use the stunning vistas of the Mexican locations to show off the CinemaScope screen dimensions to best effect.

== Plot ==
Three American adventurers are stranded in a Mexican fishing village when their ship develops engine trouble. As they discuss their options in a local saloon, Leah Fuller, whose husband John is trapped in a distant gold mine, enters. She offers them $2,000 each, tossing a bag of coins on their table. Her gesture attracts the attention of another saloon customer, Vicente, who accepts. The Americans -- an ex-sheriff named Hooker, a gambler dubbed Fiske, and a young upstart bounty hunter -- sign on as well.

During the harrowing journey inland, Leah informs Hooker that the site where her husband is trapped was once a boom town. It was erased by a volcanic eruption, leaving only a church steeple and a gold mine. The resident priest called it the "garden of evil." The Indians now consider the volcano sacred. One of the group, Vicente, keeps marking the trail and leaving stone arrows with direction-pointers, but Leah quietly dismantles the markings so that only she knows the way. When the group arrives at the mine, they discover John unconscious but alive. They work to free him just before the ceiling falls. They then transport him to a cabin where Hooker sets his broken leg. John sees the men with Leah and suspects she came back for the gold rather than him, but she denies it.

With hostile Apache nearby, the group leave. During their return, John sees he is slowing the group's progress and, with the help of the young bounty hunter, disappears. Shortly, Indians kill the bounty hunter with an arrow in the back. Later, at a burnt-out mission, the group finds John dead, hung upside down on a cross. Vicente falls next, the victim of multiple arrows. Later, the three survivors reach a choke point in a cliff-hugging pathway, the only way back to the village. Hooker and Fiske draw cards. The loser will stay behind to hold off the Indians while the other escorts Leah to safety. Fiske loses. After Leah and Hooker depart, Fiske succeeds in killing or driving off most of the Apache. However, he is mortally wounded. After seeing Leah to safety, Hooker returns to aid the besieged gambler. Fiske admits he cheated on the card draw to guarantee he would stay behind. Before he dies, Fiske urges Hooker to settle down with Leah. Hooker returns to Leah, and they ride off into the sunset.

== Cast ==
- Gary Cooper as Hooker
- Susan Hayward as Leah Fuller
- Richard Widmark as Fiske
- Hugh Marlowe as John Fuller
- Cameron Mitchell as Luke Daly
- Rita Moreno as Cantina singer
- Víctor Manuel Mendoza as Vicente Madariaga

== Production ==
The working title for the film was Volcano. It was changed because there was an Italian-made picture of the same title playing in U.S. art-house cinemas. This 1950 film, Volcano, was directed by William Dieterle and starred Rossano Brazzi and Anna Magnani.

Robert L. Jacks was originally set to produce, but he left 20th Century-Fox to join Panoramic Productions and was replaced by Charles Brackett.

Outdoor sequences in Mexico were shot at "the colonial town" of Tepotzotlán, in the jungle areas near Acapulco, Parícutin volcano with the church ruin of Nuevo San Juan Parangaricutiro, and the village of Guanajuato with the then-unrestored church ruins of Templo Santiago Apóstol, Marfil. Interior scenes were also shot at the Churubusco Studios in Mexico City.

According to author John M. Whalen, some of the outdoor footage was augmented by matte paintings:

Art directors Edward Fitzgerald and Lyle Wheeler came up with some fantastic matte paintings...The vistas that spread out on the vast Cinemascope screen are breathtaking and add a weird touch of fantasy to the film....The use of the matte paintings to enhance the natural scenery of the Guanajuato, Mexico location [established] a demarcation between the everyday world of Puerto Miguel and the mysterious Garden of Evil, where the mine is located.

== Reception ==
The New York Times reviewer wrote, "Although the story and its fireworks are interesting, they are dwarfed by the rugged mountains and lush coconut and banana-tree jungles of the film's natural settings."

Film critic of the day, Pauline Kael, called the film bloated and the meaning too obvious.

In his 1988 book, The American West in Film: Critical Approaches to the Western, author Jon Tuska observed that the American characters in Garden of Evil are "stalked on the way to the mine by Apaches wearing Mohawk hairpieces." Tuska was referencing one of the filmmakers' gaffes—dressing Apache tribe members as Mohawks. According to author Josephine Paterek, Apache generally "wore the hair long and flowing or in two braids." This was sometimes augmented with a war cap consisting of "fur and curved antelope horns." Mohawk and Iroquois tribes, those located in the northeastern U.S. almost exclusively, "shaved off all the hair except for the scalplock at the back", adorned with "a roach spreader of bone holding erect a feather that rotated freely..." Mohawk hairstyles, however, were virtually nonexistent among Native-Americans in the Southwest.

== See also ==
- List of American films of 1954
