= Jeffrey Hunter =

American actor (1926–1969)

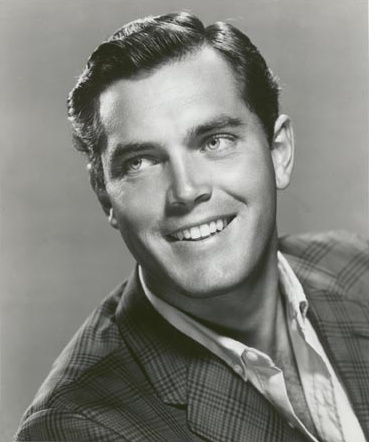
- Hunter in 1960
- Born: Henry Herman McKinnies Jr. November 25, 1926; New Orleans, Louisiana, U.S.
- Died: May 27, 1969 (aged 42); Los Angeles, California, U.S.
- Resting place: Glen Haven Memorial Park; Los Angeles, California
- Other name: Hank McKinnies
- Education: Northwestern University; University of California, Los Angeles
- Occupations: Actor; producer
- Years active: 1942–1969
- Spouses: Barbara Rush (m. 1950; div. 1955) Joan Bartlett (m. 1957; div. 1967) Emily McLaughlin (m. 1969)
- Children: 4
- Awards: Hollywood Walk of Fame

Jeffrey Hunter (born Henry Herman McKinnies Jr.; November 25, 1926 – May 27, 1969) was an American film and television actor and producer known for his roles in films such as The Searchers and King of Kings. On television, Hunter is known for his 1965 role as Captain Christopher Pike in the original pilot episode of Star Trek: The Original Series.

== Early life ==
Hunter was born in New Orleans, Louisiana, the son of Edith Lois (née Burgess) and Henry Herman McKinnies. His family was of Scottish ancestry. After 1930, he was reared in Milwaukee, Wisconsin, where he graduated from Whitefish Bay High School. He was involved in school sports and began acting in local theater and radio in his early teens.

From 1942 to 1945, he spent his summers appearing in small roles for a touring summer-stock theater company from New York called the Northport Players. He made his professional radio debut in his senior year in high school on a program called Those Who Serve, playing a G.I. After graduating from high school in 1945, Hunter joined the United States Navy. He completed a naval radar course at the Radio Technical School and was assigned to Communications Division, Headquarters of the Ninth Naval District in Great Lakes, Illinois. Although he served during World War II, he did not see any battle duty because of a broken arch bone suffered in a high school football injury.

=== College ===
After the war, he attended Northwestern University (NU), from which he graduated in 1949. Here, he was a member of Phi Delta Theta fraternity.

In college, Hunter appeared in two NU stage productions, including Ruth Gordon's Years Ago (as Captain Absolute). He also acted with the NU Theatre summer-stock company at Eagles Mere, Pennsylvania, in 1947, appearing in Too Many Husbands, The Late George Apley, Payment Deferred, The Merchant of Venice, and Fata Morgana. He did radio work with the NU Radio Workshop and Radio Guild, and worked summers with the NBC Radio Institute in Chicago.

Hunter's first film role came in 1949. While at NU, he was one of a number of students who were cast in David Bradley's version of Julius Caesar (1950). The movie featured a young Charlton Heston as Mark Antony.

He graduated from NU on August 26, 1949, then moved to the University of California at Los Angeles to get his master's degree in radio. In 1950, he was appearing in a college production of All My Sons in the role of Chris and was spotted by talent scouts from Paramount and 20th Century Fox. Paramount tested him doing two scenes from All My Sons with Ed Begley. They were impressed and offered him an option; Darryl F. Zanuck of Fox heard about this and offered him a long-term contract. The young actor agreed and the studio changed his name to "Jeffrey Hunter" on June 1, 1950.

== 20th Century Fox ==
Fox started off Hunter in a small role in Fourteen Hours (1951), shot in New York City for director Henry Hathaway; he and Debra Paget were two young people who connect while watching a man about to jump off a ledge. He had a two-minute scene in Call Me Mister (1951) and was a "campus Casanova" in a Jeanne Crain drama, Take Care of My Little Girl (1952), directed by Jean Negulesco. Hunter then was given a bigger part in the all-male war movie The Frogmen (1951) for director Lewis Milestone, supporting Richard Widmark and Dana Andrews; among his fellow support players was Robert Wagner, another young actor under contract to Fox at the time. The two would appear in several movies together and were often rivals for the same part.

=== Leading man ===
Frogmen, and Hunter's role in it, received favorable reviews and he moved into leading roles with Red Skies of Montana (1952), billed third in a film about smokejumpers with Richard Widmark and Constance Smith. He had a more conventional male juvenile lead in Belles on Their Toes (1953), a sequel to Cheaper by the Dozen, which reunited him with Crain.

Marilyn Monroe later gave an interview where she discussed Hunter's appeal:

To me, Jeff is the acme of young American manhood. Why, he looks like he just stepped off a college campus. He's extremely handsome, but this is not what impresses me. He has sort of — well, an all-encompassing type of magnetism. And he's a walking advertisement for marriage. You can't be with Jeff more than two minutes without realizing that he takes his marriage seriously, and adores his wife and child. He talks about them constantly, and with extreme pride ... You would be certain to guess, even without knowing, that Jeff is the real athletic type. He likes to ski especially, and can you think of anyone who would look better soaring down a mountain?

Fox gave Hunter his first starring role in Lure of the Wilderness (1952), a remake of Swamp Water, directed by Negulesco and opposite Jean Peters. After Dreamboat (1952), where Hunter supported Clifton Webb and Ginger Rogers, he was given his best role yet, the starring part in a war film, Sailor of the King (1953), based on C. S. Forester's book, Brown on Resolution. Although financed by Fox, it was essentially a British film, with British talent — Hunter was cast as a Canadian to explain his accent (his casting led to some difficulties with British film unions).

Sailor of the King was a minor success, Filmink arguing Hunter "didn't have that X factor of great, or even second tier stars – Hunter lacked individuality, a presence that compelled the audience to look at him, and we think this is what would hold him back as a star for the rest of his career." Hunter followed it with a Western he made with Mitzi Gaynor, Three Young Texans (1954). Princess of the Nile (1954) was an "Eastern" with Debra Paget in the title role. It was not particularly successful, either, and Hunter did not manage to transition into being a top-line star. The title role in Prince Valiant, which had been mentioned for him, was given to Robert Wagner. "It was a terrible disappointment to me", said Hunter later. "I just didn't know what to do. It seemed my career was over. They were making a lot of pictures on the lot, but I wasn't cast in any of them and I couldn't understand why, particularly since I started out with such a terrific lot of luck."

=== Career lull ===
Fox lent him out, along with Debra Paget, to Allied Artists to play the abolitionist Owen Brown in Seven Angry Men (1955), with Raymond Massey in the lead.

Hunter then played an Indian chief in the Western White Feather (1955), essentially supporting Robert Wagner. It was a moderate hit at the box office. Hunter said after it, "I had no immediate pictures scheduled... Nothing seemed to be coming up. I wasn't thinking of leaving my studio — it's important having a major studio behind you. It was just that I was restless, and nothing seemed to be happening."

With a friend, Bill Hayes, he set up a production company, Hunter Enterprises. They produced a documentary, The Living Swamp. Hunter also began appearing regularly on television, having particular success in an episode of Climax! he made with Margaret O'Brien. Back at Fox, he supported Anthony Quinn in Seven Cities of Gold (1955).

He was lent to United Artists along with fellow Fox contract players Wagner and Joanne Woodward for A Kiss Before Dying (1956). Wagner had the best role—as a killer—while Hunter had the more conventional leading-man part. (The movie was shelved for a year before being released.) Filmink wrote "Hunter's specialty by this time might best be described as 'sensible principled character who acts as a counterpoint to a neurotic lead'." A loan-out to co-star with John Wayne in the title roles of the now-classic Western The Searchers (1956) began the first of three pictures he made with director John Ford, followed by The Last Hurrah (1958) and Sergeant Rutledge (1960).

=== The Searchers ===
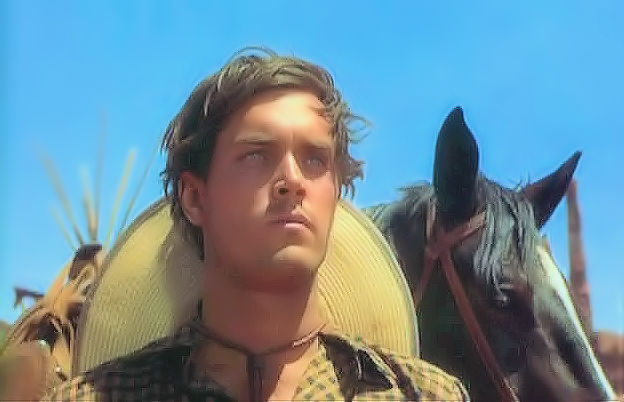
Hunter as Martin Pawley in The Searchers

Hunter's career was revitalized when he successfully lobbied John Ford to cast him as the second lead in The Searchers (1956), supporting John Wayne. Filmink argued "There's a reason that critics don't rhapsodise too much over Jeffrey Hunter, but it's a fine performance, far superior to those given by other male juveniles who supported John Wayne in Ford pictures."

Disney borrowed him to play William Allen Fuller in the Civil War action movie The Great Locomotive Chase (1956), opposite Fess Parker. Ironically, according to Parker's Archive of American Television interview, Ford had originally wanted to cast Parker in Hunter's role in The Searchers, but Disney refused to lend him out, something Parker did not hear about until years later; Parker referred to this lost opportunity as his single biggest career setback.

The success of The Searchers and The Great Locomotive Chase reignited Fox's interest in Hunter and the studio re-signed him, while giving him the right to make one "outside" film a year.

He supported Robert Ryan in a Western, The Proud Ones (1956). Hunter went over to Universal Studios and supported another older star, Fred MacMurray, in another Western, Gun for a Coward (1957), in a role originally meant for James Dean. Back at Fox, Hunter was reunited with Wagner as the James brothers in The True Story of Jesse James (1957), directed by Nicholas Ray (Hunter played Frank); it was mildly popular, although considered a critical disappointment.

Fox gave him a leading role in The Way to the Gold (1957), another Western. It was a low-budget production, but proved profitable. He was one of several leads in Fox's look at young people, No Down Payment (1957) – not a big hit, but the early work for director Martin Ritt received some critical acclaim. Fox sent Hunter to Britain to be an American star in a British war film once more: Count Five and Die (1957).

=== Illness ===
In October 1957, Hunter started shooting for his role in the Universal film If I Should Die (later Appointment with a Shadow), but collapsed following his first day on the set, and was replaced by George Nader. He was off the screen for 14 months while ill with what was diagnosed as hepatitis.

John Ford cast him in another film, The Last Hurrah (1958), starring Spencer Tracy. He had a cameo as himself in the Pat Boone musical at Fox, Mardi Gras (1958).

Hunter then made a war film, In Love and War (1958), co-starring with several other Fox signees such as Wagner. It proved popular.

Hunter formed a production company, Mexico Films, and made a film in Mexico, The Holy City, The Sacred City. It struggled to find a release.

John Ford used him for a third (and final) time as the lead in the Western legal drama Sergeant Rutledge (1960) starring Woody Strode, and the film was not a big success.

Hunter was in an urban thriller, Key Witness (1960), directed by Phil Karlson. After making the film, Fox did not renew its contract with Hunter.

In June 1959 he announced he would make The Golden Horde for his own company, Hunter Enterprises.

== Career after Fox ==
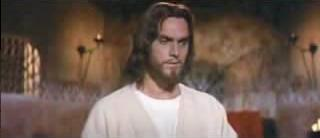
Hunter as Jesus in King of Kings

Hunter's next film was with Karlson; he played Guy Gabaldon in the Allied Artists film Hell to Eternity (1960), which was a hit at the box office. Gabaldon later named one of his sons Jeffrey Hunter Gabaldon.

Nicholas Ray cast Hunter in the role of Jesus Christ in the $8 million epic King of Kings (1961), produced by Samuel Bronston. "I've broken my shackles at last", said Hunter at the time. He told Louella Parsons, "Christ was a carpenter and 33 years old, and I am 33, and I suppose my physical measurements fitted the description in the New Testament. At the time of His death, He was robust, and not a delicate man."

It was a difficult part, met by critical reaction that ranged from praise to ridicule because of Hunter's youthful, matinee-idol appearance. However, the film was a box-office hit and remains one of Hunter's best-remembered roles. Hunter later said: "I still get an average of 1,500 letters a month from people who saw me in that film and share the beauty and inspiration I derived from it with me. There are some things that can't be measured in dollars and cents and how can anyone put a price—even the price of a million-dollar career—on the role of the greatest Being this mortal world has ever known?"

When Hunter returned to Hollywood, he deliberately selected parts that were different, such as that of a psychopathic killer in an episode of Checkmate and as the lead in a heist thriller Man-Trap (1961), directed by actor Edmond O'Brien.

At Universal, Hunter starred in No Man Is an Island (1962), the story of George Ray Tweed. He joined an all-star cast in the Fox World War II battle epic The Longest Day. Hunter provided a climactic heroic moment playing a sergeant who is killed while leading a successful attempt to breach the defense wall atop Omaha Beach in Normandy.

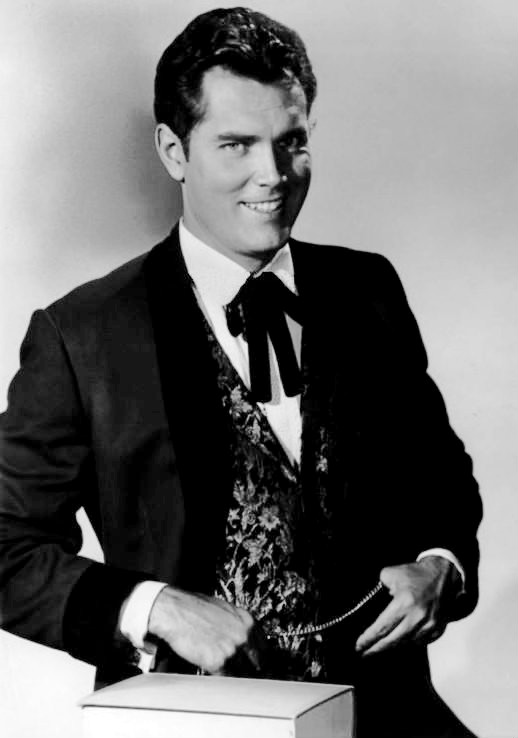
Hunter as Temple Houston (1963)

He traveled to Italy to make Gold for the Caesars (1963) with director André de Toth. He was set to costar with Spencer Tracy and James Stewart in The Long Flight when he received an offer to appear in a television show.

Having guest-starred on television dramas since the mid-1950s, Hunter was offered a two-year contract by Warner Bros. studio head Jack Warner that included a starring role as circuit-riding Texas lawyer Temple Lea Houston, the youngest son of Sam Houston, in the NBC series Temple Houston (1963–1964), which Hunter's production company coproduced.

Temple Houston did not survive beyond 26 weeks, and in 1964, Hunter accepted the lead role of Captain Christopher Pike in "The Cage", the first pilot episode of Star Trek, completed in early 1965 (with a copyright date of 1964). Hunter declined to appear in a second Star Trek pilot requested by NBC in 1965 in order to concentrate on film roles. He told the press, "I was asked to do it, but had I accepted, I would have been tied up much longer than I care to be. I have several things brewing now and they should be coming to a head in the next few weeks. I love doing motion pictures and expect to be as busy as I want to be in them."

Later in 1965, Hunter filmed the pilot for another NBC series, the espionage thriller Journey into Fear, which the network rejected.

== Later career ==
With the demise of the studio contract system in the early 1960s and the outsourcing of much feature production, Hunter, like many other leading men of the 1950s, found work in B movies produced in Italy, Hong Kong and Mexico, with an occasional television guest part in Hollywood.

His films included the William Conrad thriller Brainstorm (1965), the Western Murieta (1965), the spy film Dimension 5 (1965), the Hong Kong-filmed but unreleased Strange Portrait (1966) and A Witch Without a Broom (1967), a comedy fantasy set in Spain. He guest-starred on Insight, Daniel Boone and The F.B.I.

After a cameo in A Guide for the Married Man (1967), Hunter took the lead role in a Western shot in Spain for Sidney W. Pink, The Christmas Kid (1967). Tab Hunter (no relation) recalled in his autobiography Tab Hunter Confidential how they swapped roles:

Jeff was there to make a thriller, The Cup of St. Sebastian. Over dinner and drinks that evening, we hatched a plan.

"What the hell?" we agreed. "The producers won't know Jeffrey Hunter from Tab Hunter. Let's switch movies!"

And we did. Jeff did the western, I did the thriller. No one was the wiser.

Hunter appeared in Custer of the West (1968), shot in Spain, before returning to Hollywood, where he supported Bob Hope in The Private Navy of Sgt. O'Farrell (1968). He returned to low-budget films such as Find a Place to Die (1968), a spaghetti Western, although in the lead role. He appeared in Italian films such as Sexy Susan Sins Again (1968) and Cry Chicago (1969), and was set to make A Band of Brothers with Vince Edwards when he died.

== Personal life ==
Hunter's first marriage from 1950 to 1955 to actress Barbara Rush produced a son, Christopher (born 1952). From 1957 to 1967, Hunter was married to model Dusty Bartlett. He adopted her son Steele, and the couple had two other children, Todd and Scott. In February 1969, just three months before his death, he married actress Emily McLaughlin.

Hunter was a Republican.

== Death ==
While in Spain in November 1968 to film Cry Chicago (¡Viva América!), a story about the Chicago Mafia, Hunter was injured in an on-set explosion when a car window near him, which had been rigged to explode outward, accidentally exploded inward. Hunter sustained a serious concussion. According to Hunter's wife Emily, he "went into shock" on the flight back to the United States after filming and "couldn't speak. He could hardly move." After landing, Hunter was taken to Good Samaritan Hospital in Los Angeles, but doctors could not find any serious injuries except for a displaced vertebra and a concussion.

In April 1969, Hunter was thrown against a train compartment while filming a movie in Spain. This led to him suffering from recurring dizzy spells. On the afternoon of May 26, 1969, Hunter suffered an intracranial hemorrhage while walking down stairs at his home in Van Nuys, California. He fell, fracturing his skull. He was found unconscious and taken to Valley Presbyterian Hospital, where he underwent brain surgery. He died at about 9:30 the following morning at the age of 42.

Hunter's funeral was held at St Mark's Episcopal Church in Van Nuys on May 31. He is interred at Glen Haven Memorial Park in Sylmar.

== Honors ==
For his contribution to the television industry, Hunter has a star on the Hollywood Walk of Fame at 6918 Hollywood Boulevard.

== Filmography ==
Film
Year	Title	Role	Notes
1950	Julius Caesar	Third Plebeian	Uncredited
1951	Call Me Mister	The Kid	Two minute part.
1951	Fourteen Hours	Danny Klempner	First film under the contract with Fox. Also stars Grace Kelly in a small role.
1951	The Frogmen	Pappy Creighton	First featured billing. First film with Robert Wagner.
1951	Take Care of My Little Girl	Chad Carnes	
1952	Red Skies of Montana	Edward J. (Ed) Miller	Alternative title: Smoke Jumpers. Billed third.
1952	Belles on Their Toes	Dr. Bob Grayson	
1952	Lure of the Wilderness	Ben Tyler	First leading role.
1952	Dreamboat	Bill Ainslee	
1953	Sailor of the King	Signalman Andrew 'Canada' Brown	Alternative titles: C.S. Forester's Sailor of the King, Single-Handed. First starring role.
1954	Three Young Texans	Johnny Colt	First Western.
1954	Princess of the Nile	Prince Haidi	
1955	White Feather	Little Dog	
1955	Seven Angry Men	Owen Brown	Alternative title: God's Angry Man. First film made on loan out to another studio, Allied Artists.
1955	Seven Cities of Gold	Matuwir	
1955	The Living Swamp	–	Documentary film. Hunter produced.
1956	The Great Locomotive Chase	William A. Fuller	Alternative title: Andrews' Raiders
1956	A Kiss Before Dying	Gordon Grant	Filmed immediately before The Searchers but not released until after.
1956	The Searchers	Martin Pawley	
1956	The Proud Ones	Thad Anderson	
1957	Gun for a Coward	Bless Keough	
1957	The True Story of Jesse James	Frank James	
1957	The Way to the Gold	Joe Mundy	
1957	No Down Payment	David Martin	
1958	Count Five and Die	Captain Bill Ranson	Shot in Britain.
1958	The Last Hurrah	Adam Caulfield	Second film for John Ford.
1958	In Love and War	Sgt. Nico Kantaylis	Last film under contract to Fox.
1959	La ciudad sagrada	–	Credited as producer; re-released in 1964 as The Mighty Jungle, combined with new African-shot footage with Marshall Thompson
1960	Sergeant Rutledge	Lt. Tom Cantrell	Last film for John Ford.
1960	Hell to Eternity	Guy Gabaldon	
1960	Key Witness	Fred Morrow	
1961	Man-Trap	Matt Jameson	
1961	King of Kings	Jesus	
1962	No Man Is an Island	George R. Tweed	
1962	The Longest Day	Sgt. (later Lt.) John H. Fuller	Credited as Jeff Hunter
1963	Gold for the Caesars	Lancer	Alternative title: Oro per i Cesari. Filmed in Italy.
1963	The Man from Galveston	Timothy Higgins	Pilot for Temple Houston.
1965	Murieta	Joaquín Murrieta	Alternative title: Joaquín Murrieta
1965	Uncle Tom's Cabin		Alternative title: Onkel Toms Hütte; Voice, Uncredited
1965	Brainstorm	Jim Grayam	Credited as Jeff Hunter
1966	Dimension 5	Justin Power	
1966	Strange Portrait	Mark	Film never released theatrically.
1967	A Witch Without a Broom	Garver Logan	Credited as Jeff Hunter
1967	A Guide for the Married Man	Technical Adviser (Mountain Climber)	Cameo role
1967	The Christmas Kid	Joe Novak	
1967	Custer of the West	Capt. Frederick Benteen	
1968	The Private Navy of Sgt. O'Farrell	Lt. (J.G.) Lyman P. Jones	
1968	Find a Place to Die	Joe Collins	Alternative title: Joe... cercati un posto per morire!
1968	Sexy Susan Sins Again	Count Enrico	Alternative titles: Frau Wirtin hat auch einen Grafen; The Hostess Also Has a Count
1969	Super Colt 38	Billy Hayes	
1969	¡Viva América!	Frank Mannata	Alternative titles: The Mafia Mob; Cry Chicago (final film role)

Television
Year	Title	Role	Notes
1955–1957	Climax!	Wesley Jerome Penn; Phil Aubry	Episode: "South of the Sun"; Episode: "Hurricane Diane"
1956	The 20th Century Fox Hour	Dick Cannock	Episode: "The Empty Room"
1958	Pursuit	Lt. Aaron Gibbs	Episode: "Kiss Me Again, Stranger"
1960	Destiny, West!	John Charles Fremont	TV movie
1961	Checkmate	Edward "Jocko" Townsend	Segment: "Waiting For Jocko"
1962	The Alfred Hitchcock Hour	Harold	Episode: "Don't Look Behind You"
1962	Death Valley Days	Capt. Walter Reed, MD	Episode: "Suzie"
1962	Combat!	Sergeant Dane	Episode: "Lost Sheep, Lost Shepherd"
1963–1964	Temple Houston	Temple Houston	26 episodes Star and Executive producer
1963–1964	Bob Hope Presents the Chrysler Theatre	Gabe; Barry Stinson	Episode: "Seven Miles of Bad Road"; Episode: "Parties to the Crime"
1965	Kraft Suspense Theatre	Fred Girard	Episode: "The Trains of Silence"
1965–1968	The F.B.I.	Francis Jerome; Ralph Stuart	Episode: "The Monsters"; Episode: "The Enemies"
1966	Journey into Fear	Dr. Howard Graham	Episode: "Seller's Market"
1966	The Legend of Jesse James	Jeremy Thrallkill	Episode: " A Field of Wild Flowers"
1966	Daniel Boone	Roark Logan	Episode: "Requiem for Craw Green"
1966	The Green Hornet	Emmet Crown	Episode: "Freeway to Death"
1965–1966	Star Trek	Captain Christopher Pike	Episode: "The Cage"; Released posthumously (1986); Episode: "The Menagerie"; Footage incorporated from "The Cage"
1967	The Monroes	Ed Stanley	Episode: "Wild Bill"
1967–1969	Insight	James Smith; Ken	Episode: "Madam"; Episode: "The Poker Game"
