= Debra Paget =

American actress and entertainer (born 1933)

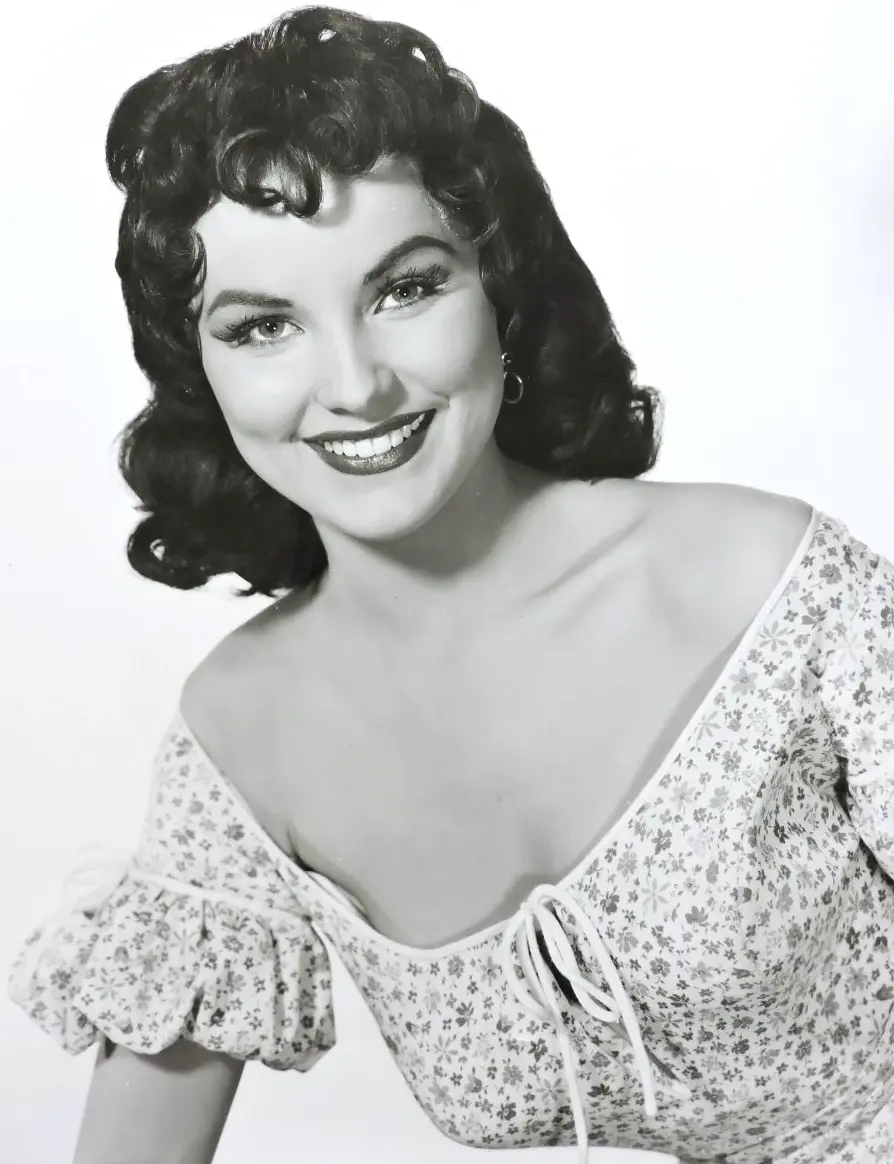
- Paget in 1954
- Born: Debralee Griffin; August 19, 1933 (age 92); Denver, Colorado, U.S.
- Occupation: Actress
- Years active: 1948–1965
- Spouses: David Street (m. 1958; div. 1958); Budd Boetticher (m. 1960; div. 1961); Louis Ling-Chieh Kung (m. 1962; div. 1980)
- Children: 1
- Relatives: Lisa Gaye (sister); Teala Loring (sister)

Debra Paget (born Debralee Griffin; August 19, 1933) is a retired American actress and entertainer. She is perhaps best known for her performances in Cecil B. DeMille's epic The Ten Commandments (1956) and in Elvis Presley's film debut, Love Me Tender (1956), as well as for her snake dance scene in The Indian Tomb (1959).

== Early life ==
Paget was born in Denver, Colorado, one of five children of Margaret Allen (née Gibson), a former actress (one source says "ex-burlesque queen"), and Frank Henry Griffin, a painter. The family moved to Los Angeles in the 1930s, to be near the film industry. Paget was enrolled in the Hollywood Professional School when she was 11. Margaret was determined that Debra and her siblings would also make their careers in show business. Three of Paget's siblings, Marcia (Teala Loring), Leslie (Lisa Gaye), and Frank (Ruell Shayne), entered show business.

Paget had her first professional job at age 8, and acquired some stage experience at 13 when she acted in a 1946 production of Shakespeare's The Merry Wives of Windsor.

== Career ==
=== 20th Century-Fox ===
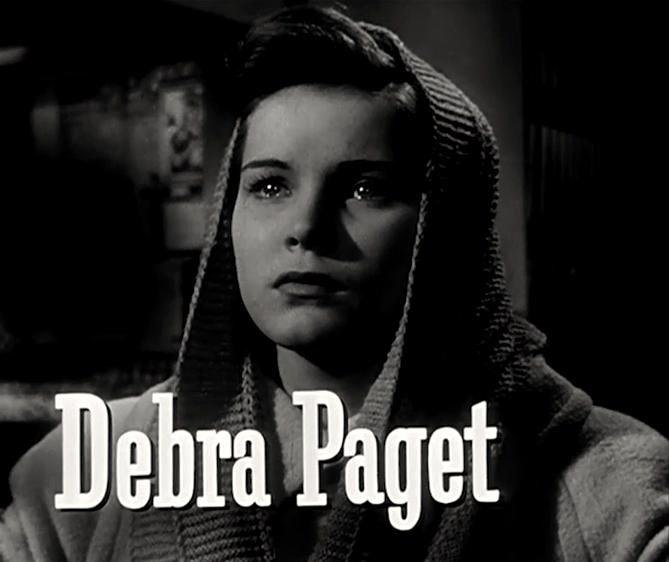
Paget in the trailer for Cry of the City (1948)

Paget's first notable film role was as Teena Riconti in Cry of the City, a 1948 film noir directed by Robert Siodmak for 20th Century Fox studios, where the 14-year-old actress played the girlfriend of a hoodlum played by 38-year-old Richard Conte.

Fox liked her and signed her to a long-term contract. She had small roles in several subsequent motion pictures in the next year in Mother Is a Freshman (1949), It Happens Every Spring (1949) and House of Strangers (1949).

==== Early vehicles ====
Paget's first vehicle for Fox was the successful Broken Arrow with James Stewart. At the age of 16, Paget played a Native American maiden, Sonseeahray ("morningstar"), who falls in love with Stewart's character. Stewart was 42 at the time.

From 1950 to 1956, she took part in six original live radio plays broadcast nationally on Family Theater. During that same period, she read parts in four adaptations of recently released and upcoming theatrical feature films on the Lux Radio Theatre program, sharing the microphone with such actors as Burt Lancaster, Tyrone Power, Cesar Romero, Ronald Colman, and Robert Stack. She reprised two of her feature film roles in these broadcasts.

Paget had a sizable role in Fourteen Hours (1951) and was reunited with Broken Arrow director Delmer Daves and star Jeff Chandler in Bird of Paradise (1951), playing a similar role as that in Broken Arrow.

Paget was the second female lead in Anne of the Indies (1951). She was third billed in Belles on Their Toes (1952) and second billed in Les Misérables (1952), playing Cosette.

Paget was Robert Wagner's love interest in Stars and Stripes Forever (1952) and Prince Valiant (1954). In 1953, wearing a blonde wig, she auditioned along with Anita Ekberg and Irish McCalla, among others, for the starring role in Sheena, Queen of the Jungle, which went to McCalla.

==== Leading roles ====
Fox finally gave Paget top billing with the swashbuckler and historical fiction epic Princess of the Nile (1954), co-starring Jeffrey Hunter. The film was not a notable success at the box office. However, during the year after Princess of the Nile was released, the fan mail Paget received at 20th Century-Fox studios was topped only by that for Marilyn Monroe and Betty Grable.

Paget had a substantial supporting role in Demetrius and the Gladiators (1954), starring Victor Mature, the sequel to the earlier The Robe (1953), starring Richard Burton, Jean Simmons and Victor Mature. Like the first film, it was a commercial success. She was Dale Robertson's love interest in The Gambler from Natchez (1954) and played another Native American in the next year's White Feather (1955), playing the sister of Jeffrey Hunter's character, and lover of Robert Wagner's character.

Fox loaned Paget and Hunter to Allied Artists to appear in Seven Angry Men (1955). At MGM (Metro-Goldwyn-Mayer), when Anne Bancroft was injured during filming The Last Hunt (1956), that studio borrowed Paget to substitute and play her role, another Native American character.

=== The Ten Commandments ===
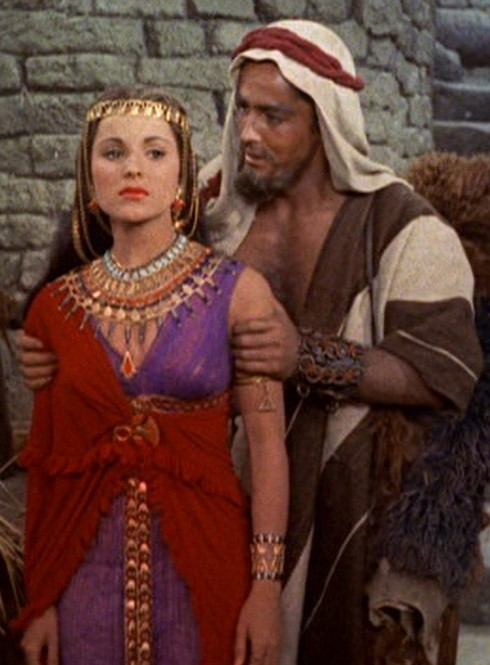
With John Derek in the trailer for The Ten Commandments (1956)

Paramount Pictures borrowed her from 20th Century Fox for the part of Lilia, the water girl, in Cecil B. DeMille's biblical epic The Ten Commandments (1956), her most successful film. She had to wear brown contact lenses to hide her blue eyes; she said that "If it hadn't been for the lenses I wouldn't have gotten the part". She also said that the lenses were "awful to work in because the klieg lights heat[ed] them up".

The film was a huge success, as was Paget's Fox western, Love Me Tender (1956) alongside Elvis Presley. Paget and Richard Egan were billed above Presley, but it was the explosion of the newly discovered rock 'n roll singer's popularity and charisma that made the film so successful.

The River's Edge (1957) was the last film she made for Fox.

=== Post-Fox ===
After that, Paget's career began to decline. She went to Paramount Pictures to play Cornel Wilde's love interest in Omar Khayyam (1957). She was the juvenile lead in From the Earth to the Moon (1958), based on the Jules Verne’s 1865 science fiction novel.

A talented dancer and singer, Paget also had a successful occasional nightclub act at the Flamingo Hotel in Las Vegas, Nevada.

=== European productions ===
In 1958, she traveled to Germany to headline the cast of Fritz Lang's two-film adventure saga, The Tiger of Eschnapur and The Indian Tomb (1959), a role that recalled her character in Princess of the Nile. In both films, she has a lengthy and erotic dance scene, which achieved a certain fame.

Paget appeared in Cleopatra's Daughter (1960) and Rome 1585 (1961), both filmed in Italy.

=== Return to Hollywood and television roles ===
She returned to the US to make Why Must I Die? (1960) for American International Pictures and Most Dangerous Man Alive (1961) for Columbia Pictures. Her final two films were for producer/director Roger Corman at American International Pictures: Tales of Terror (1963) and The Haunted Palace (1963).

She did television work throughout her career. In 1959, Paget appeared as Lela Russell with Russell Johnson in the episode "The Unwilling" of the NBC Western television series Riverboat (1959-1961), starring Darren McGavin. In the first episode of the third season (1959) of NBC's Wagon Train, she played a Mexican revolutionary.

In 1960, she appeared as Laura Ashley in the episode "Incident of the Garden of Eden" on CBS's Western series, Rawhide. That same year, she played the only surviving witness to a stagecoach robbery in another CBS Western, Johnny Ringo, starring Don Durant. In 1962, she returned to Rawhide to play the part of Azuela in the episode "Hostage Child" along with James Coburn.

Her last performance in this medium came in a December 1965 episode of the ABC detective drama Burke's Law, starring Gene Barry.

She retired from entertainment roles that year after marrying a wealthy oil executive, by whom she later had one son, her only child.

=== Post-Hollywood career ===
Paget became a born-again evangelical Christian. She hosted her own show, An Interlude with Debra Paget, on the Trinity Broadcasting Network (TBN), a conservative, fundamentalist Christian cable television network, in the early 1990s, and also was involved in Praise the Lord. She occasionally appeared on TBN as a guest.

In 1987, the Motion Picture and Television Fund presented Paget with its Golden Boot Award, which is awarded to those actors, writers, directors, and stunt crew who "have contributed so much to the development and preservation of the western tradition in film and television."

Independent filmmaker Mark Rappaport paid tribute to her in his 2016 documentary essay, Debra Paget, For Example.

== Personal life ==
During production of Love Me Tender (1956), Elvis Presley became smitten with Paget, who in 1997 said that he had proposed marriage. At the time the media reported that she was once romantically linked with Howard Hughes, but nothing came of this infatuation. A 1956 article quoted Paget's comments about Hughes:

I was in love with Howard for two years, and I don't care who knows it... I was never alone with him in the whole two years. Mother was always with us... I haven't seen Howard for a long time now, because I'm a one-man woman, and I've got to have a one-woman man... But I'll always remember Howard with fondness.

Paget married actor and singer David Street on January 14, 1958, but she obtained a divorce on April 11, 1958.

On March 27, 1960, she married director Budd Boetticher in Tijuana, Mexico. They separated after 22 days, and their divorce became official in 1961.

Paget left the entertainment industry in 1964 after marrying Louis Ling-Chieh Kung (孔令傑) on April 19, 1962. Kung, a descendant of Confucius, was a Chinese-American oil industry executive. His parents were banker and politician H. H. Kung and businesswoman Soong Ai-ling. His maternal aunts were Soong Mei-ling, wife of Chiang Kai-shek and First Lady of the Republic of China, and political figure Soong Ching-ling. Paget and Kung had one son, Gregory Teh-chi Kung. Their marriage ended in divorce in 1980.

== Filmography ==
=== Feature films ===
Year	Title	Role
1948	Cry of the City	Teena Riconti
1949	Mother Is a Freshman	Linda
1949	It Happens Every Spring	Alice
1949	House of Strangers	Maria Domenico
1950	Broken Arrow	Sonseeahray
1950	Fourteen Hours	Ruth
1951	Bird of Paradise	Kalua
1951	Anne of the Indies	Molly LaRochelle
1952	Belles on Their Toes	Martha Gilbreth
1952	Les Misérables	Cosette
1952	Stars and Stripes Forever	Lily Becker
1954	Prince Valiant	Ilene
1954	Princess of the Nile	Princess Shalimar/Taura
1954	Demetrius and the Gladiators	Lucia
1954	The Gambler from Natchez	Melanie Barbee
1955	White Feather	Appearing Day
1955	Seven Angry Men	Elizabeth Clark
1956	The Last Hunt	Indian girl
1956	The Ten Commandments	Lilia
1956	Love Me Tender	Cathy Reno
1957	The River's Edge	Margaret Cameron
1957	Omar Khayyam	Sharain
1957	From the Earth to the Moon	Virginia Nicholl
1959	The Tiger of Eschnapur	Seetha
1959	The Indian Tomb	Seetha
1960	Cleopatra's Daughter	Shila
1960	Why Must I Die?	Dottie Manson
1961	Most Dangerous Man Alive (shot in 1958)	Linda Marlow
1961	Rome 1585	Esmeralda
1962	Tales of Terror (segment: "The Facts in the Case of M. Valdemar")	Helene Valdemar
1963	The Haunted Palace	Ann Ward

=== Radio plays broadcast ===
==== Family Theater ====
- November 29, 1950 - "The Clown" – Debra Paget, Stephen Dunn
- January 23, 1952 - "The Thinking Machine" – Donald O'Connor, Debra Paget
- February 11, 1953 - "The Indispensable Man" – Lisa Gaye, Robert Stack, Debra Paget
- December 9, 1953 - "The Legend of High Chin Bob" – Debra Paget, Walter Brennan
- July 27, 1955 - "Fairy Tale" – Debra Paget, Jack Haley
- November 7, 1956 - "Integrity" – Debra Paget, Cesar Romero

==== Lux Radio Theatre ====
- January 22, 1951 - "Broken Arrow" – Burt Lancaster, Debra Paget
- September 22, 1952 -"I'll Never Forget You" – Tyrone Power, Debra Paget, Michael Pate
- December 22, 1952 - "Les Misérables" – Ronald Colman, Debra Paget, Robert Newton
- April 20, 1953 - "Deadline USA" – Dan Dailey, Debra Paget, William Conrad

==== Stars over Hollywood ====
- February 21, 1953 - "The Wonderful Miss Prinn" – Debra Paget
