= Lisa Daniels (actress) =

British actress (1930–2010)

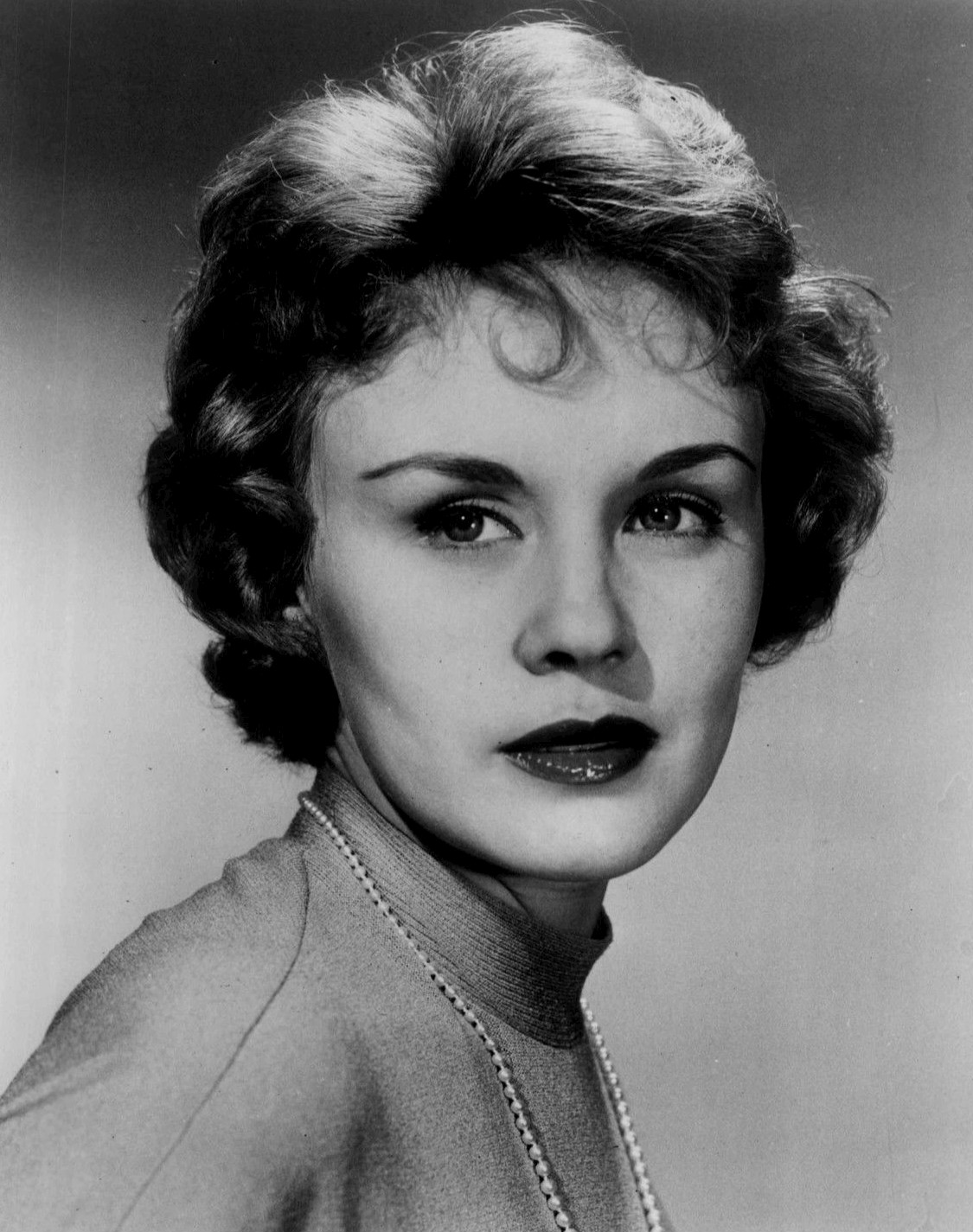
- Daniels in 1957
- Born: Gladys Elizabeth Morgan; 31 December 1930; Hockley, Birmingham, England
- Died: 12 February 2010 (aged 79); Los Angeles, California, United States
- Other names: Elizabeth Morgan; Lisbeth Kearns
- Occupation: Actress
- Years active: 1953–1976
- Spouses: Peter Daniels; Roger Hill Lewis

Gladys Elizabeth Morgan (31 December 1930 – 12 February 2010), known professionally as Lisbeth Kearns and later Lisa Daniels, was an English actress and dancer. She began her career on the West End stage before moving to Hollywood. She also worked as a voice actress on the 1961 film One Hundred and One Dalmatians as Perdita.

== Biography ==
Gladys Elizabeth Morgan was born in the back of her mother May's fish and chip shop on Icknield Street in Hockley, Birmingham. Her mother was from Aston, while her father was a Welsh miner from Ebbw Vale. She attended Ellen Street and Camden Street schools. At age 13, she won Miss Birmingham.

At age 14, she was a dancer in Cinderella at the Alexandra Theatre. She took over the lead role from Noele Gordon when Gordon fell ill. Morgan then went to London to make a name for herself on the West End stage as Lisbeth Kearns.

She relocated to Pasadena in 1953 after marrying pianist Peter Daniels and changed her stage name to Lisa Daniels. The marriage did not last and was annulled. She later married Roger Hill Lewis. Her niece Jean Blytheway said her aunt "never forgot her life in Birmingham and was proud of where she came from".

== Filmography ==
- Man in the Attic (1953) - Mary Lenihan
- Princess of the Nile (1954) - Handmaiden
- The Gambler from Natchez (1954) - Ivette Rivage
- The Glass Slipper (1955) - Serafina
- The Virgin Queen (1955) - Mary
- One Hundred and One Dalmatians (1961) - Perdita (voice)
- The Swimmer (1968) - Matron at the Biswangers' Pool (uncredited)
- The Andromeda Strain (1971) - Woman (uncredited)
- Swashbuckler (1976) - Pirates' Lady

== Bibliography ==
- Charles Affron. Star acting: Gish, Garbo, Davis. Dutton, 1977.
- John Grant. Encyclopedia of Walt Disney's animated characters. Hyperion Books, 1998.
