= Prince Valiant (1954 film) =

1954 film by Henry Hathaway

- Theatrical release poster
- Directed by: Henry Hathaway
- Written by: Dudley Nichols
- Based on: Prince Valiant; 1937 American comic strip by Hal Foster
- Produced by: Robert L. Jacks
- Starring: James Mason; Janet Leigh; Robert Wagner; Debra Paget; Sterling Hayden; Victor McLaglen; Donald Crisp; Brian Aherne; Barry Jones
- Cinematography: Lucien Ballard
- Edited by: Robert L. Simpson
- Music by: Franz Waxman
- Production company: 20th Century-Fox
- Distributed by: 20th Century-Fox
- Release date: April 2, 1954 (Los Angeles)
- Running time: 100 minutes
- Country: United States
- Language: English
- Budget: $2.97 million
- Box office: $2.6 million (US rentals)

Prince Valiant is a 1954 American historical adventure film directed by Henry Hathaway and produced by Robert L. Jacks, in Technicolor and Cinemascope, produced and released by 20th Century-Fox. Based on the King Features syndicated newspaper comic strip of the same name by Hal Foster, the film stars James Mason, Janet Leigh, Robert Wagner, Debra Paget, and Sterling Hayden.

== Plot ==
Usurper Sligon, a worshipper of the old Norse god pantheon, and other rebel Vikings have forced into exile the Christian royal family of the Viking kingdom of Scandia: King Aguar, his wife, and their son, Prince Valiant. The family comes under King Arthur's protection. After having grown to become a man, Valiant is sent to Camelot to train under the tutelage of Aguar's family friend, a knight of the Round Table, Sir Gawain.

During his wanderings, Valiant witnesses a clandestine meeting between some of Sligon's Vikings and a black-clad knight. Valiant is discovered, but eludes his pursuers and runs into Sir Gawain. Gawain takes Valiant to King Arthur, who decrees that Valiant shall become a knight by undergoing a squire's training. One of Arthur's knights, Sir Brack, offers to take him on, but Valiant is instead made squire to Sir Gawain.

Brack offers to take Valiant to the place where the prince has seen the Black Knight, someone known only by rumor in Camelot, in order to backtrack him. Once there, they separate, and Valiant is ambushed by bowmen. He escapes with an arrow in his back, stumbles into the territory of King Luke and is taken in by his daughters, Aleta and Ilene. Aleta and Valiant fall in love, but Luke disapproves of Valiant's Viking origin; so their relationship must remain a secret. Meanwhile, Ilene is attracted to Gawain. Back at Camelot, Valiant discovers that, while searching for him, Gawain ran into an ambush by the Black Knight and barely survived it. Noting that Brack had disappeared around the same time, Valiant becomes suspicious.

Later, Aleta and Ilene attend a tournament held in Camelot in their honor. As an added prize, the victor of the tournament will win Aleta's hand. Sir Gawain is too wounded to participate. Valiant dons Gawain's armor in order to win Aleta, but loses his joust and is unmasked. Another contender appears and wins the bout before falling off his horse. This knight is actually Gawain. Awakening on his sickbed, Gawain beholds Aleta and falls in love with her. Out of respect for his patron, Valiant withholds the truth about their relationship from him.

For his act of presumption, Valiant is confined to his quarters and forced to tend Gawain. A messenger comes to the castle to see Brack, and the same night Aguar's seal ring is thrown through the window of Gawain's chambers. Realizing that his parents are in trouble, Valiant prepares to return to his home. Before he can do this, however, he is captured by Sligon's Vikings and the Black Knight, who is actually Brack. Brack made a pact with Sligon: For delivering Aguar's family, Sligon will aid him in conquering Camelot and becoming the King of Britain.

Worried about Valiant, Aleta arrives and is captured. The two are brought to Scandia, where Sligon prepares to execute them and Valiant's captured parents. However, a group of Christian Vikings, led by Aguar's family friend Boltar, stage a revolt. Boltar infiltrates the castle to assassinate Sligon, encounters Valiant, who escaped his cell, and orders him to give the attack signal to their group once Sligon has fallen. But Valiant is discovered before Boltar can kill Sligon; and during his struggle with a guard a false signal is given, causing the Christian Vikings to attack too soon. To solve the situation, Valiant sets parts of the castle ablaze, breaching the wall and throwing the defenders into confusion, and manages to slay Sligon.

Valiant then returns to Camelot with Aleta and accuses Brack of treachery before Arthur and the assembled Round Table knights. Brack calls for a trial by combat, and despite Gawain's protest and his offer to fight in Valiant's stead, the prince accepts the challenge. In the ensuing fight, Valiant kills Brack. He offers Aleta to Gawain; but during the period of worry about them, the latter had learned the truth. Gawain gives Aleta and Valiant his blessing, and having redeemed his honor by exposing Brack, Valiant is made a Knight of the Round Table by King Arthur.

== Cast ==
- Robert Wagner as Prince Valiant
- James Mason as Sir Brack
- Janet Leigh as Princess Aleta of Ord
- Debra Paget as Princess Ilene of Ord
- Sterling Hayden as Sir Gawain
- Victor McLaglen as Boltar
- Donald Crisp as Aguar, exiled King of Scandia
- Brian Aherne as King Arthur
- Barry Jones as King Luke of Ord
- Mary Philips as Queen of Scandia
- Howard Wendell as Morgan Todd
- Tom Conway as Sir Kay
- Primo Carnera as Sligon, usurping King of Scandia
- Don Megowan as Sir Lancelot
- Richard Webb as Sir Galahad
- Jarma Lewis as Queen Guinevere
- Neville Brand as Viking Warrior Chief
- John Davidson as Patriarch
- John Dierkes as Sir Tristram
- Otto Waldis as Patch-Eye
- Percival Vivian as Royal Physician
- Robert Adler as Brack's Man-at-Arms
- James Dime
- Michael Rennie as Narrator (voice only)

== Production ==
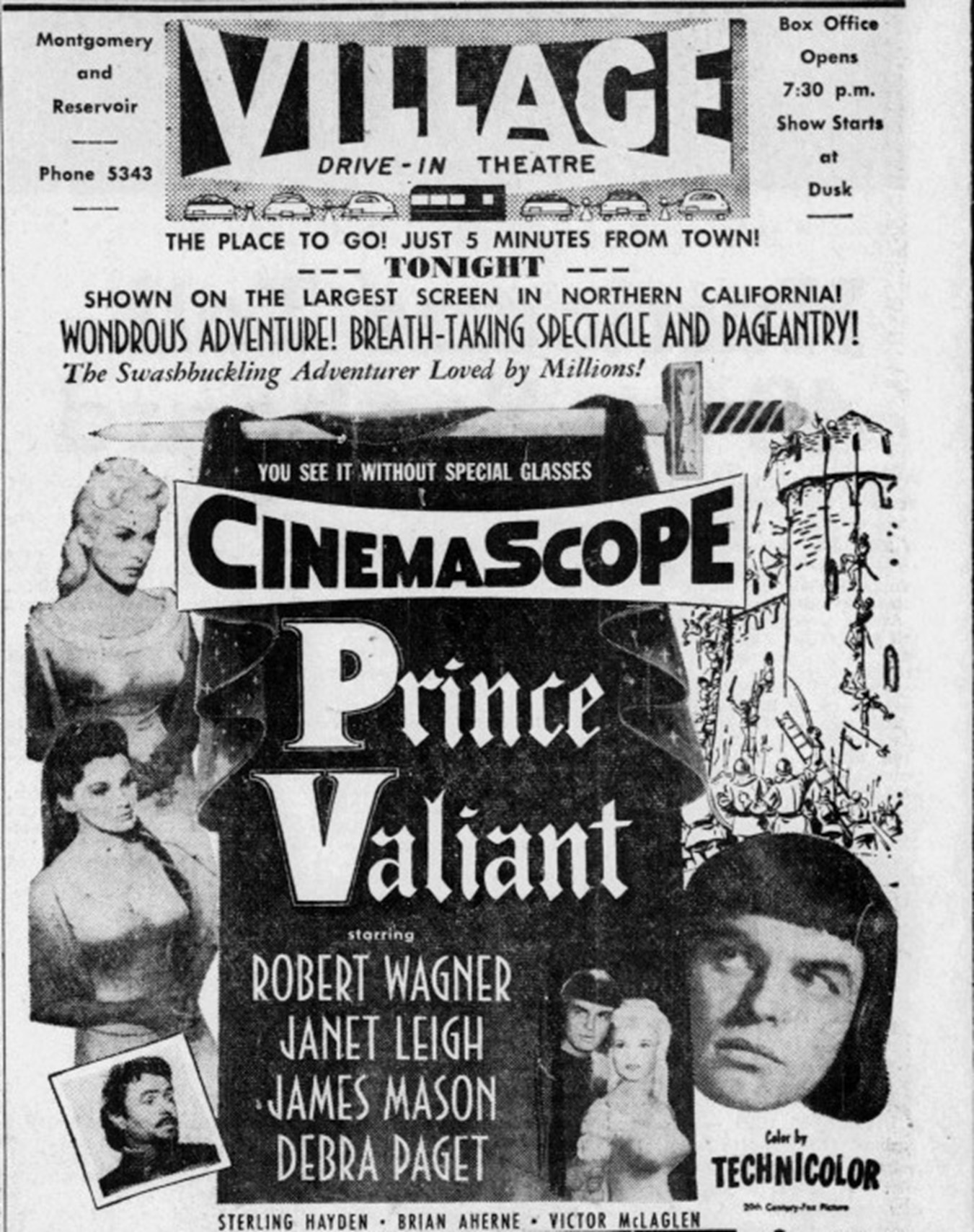
Drive-in advertisement from 1954.

A number of studios had been interested in the film rights to the comic strip. In 1946 Eagle Lion announced they had purchased them. Then rights transferred to MGM. 20th Century-Fox obtained the rights to the comic strip after MGM allowed their option to lapse. The film was the idea of producer Robert Jacks, the son-in-law of Fox head Darryl F. Zanuck. Fox bought the rights to eight years of published comic strip stories, but adapted only a 1937 storyline.

In December 1952 Henry Hathaway was assigned as director. Medieval swashbucklers had been an experiencing a recent surge of popularity since the success of MGM's Ivanhoe (1952). Hathaway later called Jacks "a beach bum surfer" and did the film only as a personal favour for Zanuck adding "I didn't particularly care one way or the other and the picture looked it."

In March 1953 Robert Wagner was cast to star in the title role. He had his hair cut to match that in the comic strip. The actor later joked "Dean Martin passed me on the lot and thought I was Jane Wyman."

Wagner later wrote in his memoirs that he loved the comic strip as a child, was happy to be working with Henry Hathaway and James Mason: "I thought the picture was good, and I loved the romance of the subject matter... and I thought I was sensational. I had no idea it would become for me what "Yonda lies the castle of my fadduh" was for Tony Curtis". He put this down to miscasting and being teased for his appearance: "I got upset about the ridicule, so much so that I still have a block about that movie."

Shot in CinemaScope, the film - along with The Robe - would be the studio's biggest production of the year, with a budget of $3 million. Michael Rennie was going to play King Arthur and Robert Newton Bolthar. Hathaway and producer Robert Jacks left for England in April to scout locations. Eventually, neither Rennie or Newton would appear in the final film, although Rennie ended up narrating it.

The castle was constructed at a cost of $83,000. The castle battle sequence cost $250,000. Filming started on July 7, 1953, on the Fox backlot although Hathaway shot background footage in Scotland from April through to June. The shoot took until that November.

A sequel, Valiant and Aleta dealing with Valiant's married life with Aleta, was planned but never produced.

== Reception ==
=== Box office ===
According to contemporary reports the film made $2.6 million in North America, which did not recoup its reported cost of $2.9 million.

=== Critical ===
Bosley Crowther of The New York Times wrote that the film was a faithful adaptation of the comic strip, and that the best part were the epic action scenes. He observed that the film would satisfy younger viewers. Variety wrote: "Although the picture comes in a bit overlength at 100 minutes, the direction and Dudley Nichols' scripting combine to bring it off acceptably against some rather dazzling settings, including authentic castles actually lensed in England". A rave review in Harrison's Reports called it "one of the most exciting and thrilling action-filled romantic adventure melodramas ever brought to the screen", and called Wagner "a human dynamo" in the title role. John McCarten of The New Yorker wrote in a negative review of the film that "as it flounders about, it cuts some unintentionally comic capers that might amuse you if you are feeling amiable ... Prince Valiant is played by Robert Wagner, who reads his lines in a vacant monotone and wears a long Dutch bob and a jerkin with the skittish air of a man trying to be funny in a lady's hat". The Monthly Film Bulletin declared: "Judged as an articulated comic strip, the film is intermittently amusing; by any other standards, it is merely a tasteless costume-piece". FilmInk called Wagner "absurdly miscast".
