= Robert L. Jacks =

American film and television producer (1927–1987)

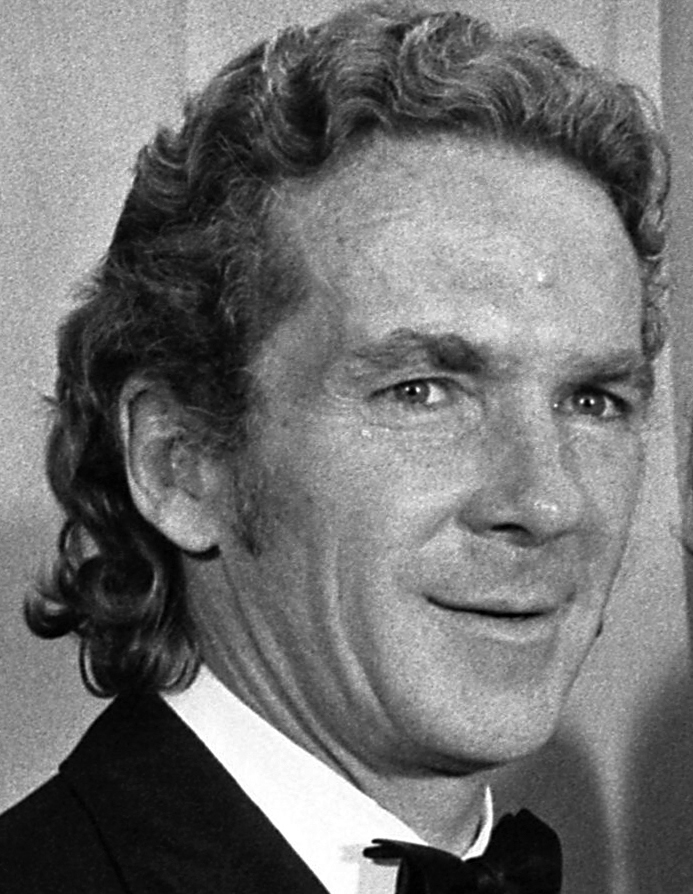
Jacks in 1973

Robert L Jacks (1927–1987) was an American film producer.

He married the daughter of Darryl F. Zanuck who gave him a job at 20th Century Fox.

He set up his own company in the late 1960s.

== Select filmography ==
- Lure of the Wilderness (1952)
- Princess of the Nile (1954)
- The Proud Ones (1956)
