= Cavalcade of America =

American anthology drama radio and TV series

- Musical director Donald Voorhees (1935–41 and 1949–53)
- Genre: Anthology drama
- Running time: 25 minutes
- Country of origin: United States
- Language: English
- Home station: CBS Radio; NBC Red Network; NBC Blue network NBC Radio Network
- Starring: Numerous Broadway and Hollywood stars
- Announcer: Frank Singiser; Gabriel Heatter; Basil Ruysedael; Bud Collyer; Gayne Whitman; Ted Pearson; Bill Hamilton; Ross Martin
- Created by: Roy S. Durstine
- Written by: Arthur Miller; Norman Rosten; Robert Tallman; Peter Lyon; Robert Richards; Stuart Hawkins; Arthur Arent; Edith Sommer; Halsted Welles; Henry Denker; Priscilla Kent; Virginia Radcliffe; Frank Gabrielson; Margaret Lewerth; Morton Wishengrad; George Faulkner; Irve Tunick
- Directed by: Kenneth Webb; Homer Fickett; Bill Sweet; Jack Zoller
- Produced by: Arthur Pryor, Jr. Louis Mason; Larry Harding; Homer Fickett; Jack Zoller; Roger Pryor; H.L. Blackburn
- Executive producer: Roy S. Durstine
- Narrated by: Walter Huston
- Original release: October 9, 1935 – March 31, 1953
- No. of series: 18
- No. of episodes: 781
- Audio format: Monaural sound
- Opening theme: Glory of America (by Alexander László)
- Ending theme: March Theme (by Alexander László)
- Sponsored by: DuPont Company

Cavalcade of America is an anthology drama series that was sponsored by the DuPont Company, although it occasionally presented musicals, such as an adaptation of Show Boat, and condensed biographies of popular composers. It was initially broadcast on radio from 1935 to 1953, and on television from 1952 to 1957. Originally on CBS Radio, the series pioneered the use of anthology drama for company audio advertising. The series moved to the NBC Red Network, NBC Blue network, and NBC Radio Network.

== Radio ==
=== Background ===
DuPont's motto, "Maker of better things for better living through chemistry," was read at the beginning of each program, and the dramas emphasized humanitarian progress, particularly improvements in the lives of women, often through technological innovation.

Cavalcade of America started as part of a successful campaign to reinvigorate DuPont. In the early 1930s, the Nye Committee investigations concluded that DuPont had made a fortune profiteering in World War I. The company stood accused of encouraging an arms race between World War I enemies, after being heavily subsidized by the Allies to increase black powder production. The negative effects of the investigation left the company demoralized, directionless and with a tarnished corporate image in the middle of the Great Depression. DuPont was not the only company being investigated, those were H Hercules Powder Company, General Motors Corporation, Anaconda Copper Company, United States Steel Corporation, and Bethlehem Steel Company.

DuPont's products were primarily not for public consumption, so there was no purpose in promoting them through advertising. As a solution to DuPont's troubles, Roy S. Durstine, then creative director of Batten, Barton, Durstine & Osborn, proposed the creation of Cavalcade of America using the company motto. This was to be an important element in the successful rebranding of DuPont as an American legacy engaged in making products for the well-being of Americans and humanity in general. Durstine hired Arthur Pryor, Jr. in 1927 to head the BBDO radio department. Pryor either directed or oversaw the development of General Motors Family Party and The Parade of the States, Standard Oil of New York's Soconyland Sketches, and DuPont's Cavalcade of America. BBDO presented DuPont with two programs: a Channing Pollock monologue and Cavalcade of America. Lammot du Pont II and DuPont's executive committee inspected in detail the show until Bruce Barton got involved. Durstine and Columbia Broadcasting System came to terms with network affiliates and its willingness to broadcast a program from an advertising firm. Edgar Kobak, vice president of sales at NBC Radio Network, was not happy that NBC had lost out to CBS.

=== Content ===
DuPont's image problems led the company to promote some pacifist and socialist ideals. DuPont stipulated several topics would be taboo on the show, such as gunfire of any kind, which attracted writers such as Norman Rosten and Arthur Miller, who had signed the Oxford Pledge while at University of Michigan. For scripts, the program was also able to attract such prominent writers as Maxwell Anderson, Stephen Vincent Benét, Carl Sandburg and Robert Sherwood. Although Yale University historian Frank Monaghan signed on as an advisor to ensure historically accuracy of the scripts, listeners were quick to point out anachronisms; trains did not use air brakes in 1860 instead used brakemen, and Washington's troops could not have sung O Tannenbaum while crossing the Delaware since it was written forty-eight years after that event making the program not have continuity.

Cavalcade of America offered something different than the escapist entertainment, the sensationalized cries of soap operas, or the hard-boiled dialogue of crime thrillers. It offered a look back at American History. Producers made careful decisions on scripts deliberately trying to avoid offending the affluent audience and not including people of color. The show gained a wider audience giving producers confidence to do different story material. This produced stories from Hollywood screenwriters, film adaptions, and original works. Singer Woody Guthrie performed on an episode titled Wild Bill Hickok: The Last Of Two Gun Justice in 1940. In June 1944, producers thought about changing the program to a folksy serial and sought out stars and stories for its upcoming season.

=== Episodes ===
Season	Start date	End date	Num. of ep	Station	Audience rating (in millions)	Day	Time (Eastern Time Zone)
1	October 9, 1935	September 30, 1936	51	CBS Radio	6.3	Wednesday	8:00 P.M.
2	October 7, 1936	June 29, 1937	51	CBS Radio	5.9	Wednesday	8:00 P.M.
3	October 6, 1937	June 29, 1938	39	CBS Radio	7.4	Wednesday	8:00 P.M.
4	December 5, 1938	May 29, 1939	26	CBS Radio	6.0	Monday	8:00 P.M.
5	January 2, 1940	June 25, 1940	26	NBC Red Network; &; NBC Blue Network	6.5	Tuesday	7:30 P.M.
6	October 2, 1940	September 29, 1941	53	NBC Red Network; &; NBC Blue Network	7.9	Wednesday; Monday; Monday	7:30 P.M.; 7:30 P.M.; 8:00 P.M.
7	October 6, 1941	September 28, 1942	52	NBC Red Network; &; NBC Blue Network	11.9	Monday	7:30 P.M.
8	October 5, 1942	September 27, 1943	52	NBC Red Network; &; NBC Blue Network	13.0	Monday	8:00 P.M.
9	October 4, 1943	September 11, 1944	50	NBC Red Network; &; NBC Blue Network	11.5	Monday	8:00 P.M.
10	September 18, 1944	June 25, 1945	40	NBC Red Network; &; NBC Blue Network	11.6	Monday	8:00 P.M.
11	August 27, 1945	June 24, 1946	44	NBC Radio Network	10.4	Monday	8:00 P.M.
12	August 26, 1946	June 16, 1947	43	NBC Radio Network	10.7	Monday	8:00 P.M.
13	August 18, 1947	July 12, 1948	48	NBC Radio Network	10.4	Monday	8:00 P.M.
14	September 13, 1948	June 27, 1949	44	NBC Radio Network	8.1	Monday	8:00 P.M.
15	August 30, 1949	June 27, 1950	48	NBC Radio Network	10.2	Tuesday	8:00 P.M.
16	August 29, 1950	July 3, 1951	45	NBC Radio Network	6.8	Tuesday	8:00 P.M.
17	September 4, 1951	June 24, 1952	43	NBC Radio Network	8.5	Tuesday	8:00 P.M.
18	August 26, 1952	March 31, 1953	31	NBC Radio Network	4.5	Tuesday	8:00 P.M.

The premiere episode of Cavalcade of America titled No Turning Back starred Walter Hampden as Edward Winslow in part one and a farmer, a descendent of Winslow, in South Dakota in part two on October 9, 1935.

In the summer of 1936 Cavalcade of America deviated from its normal storytelling to air music starting with The Development Of Band Music In America, Part 1: The Small Bands: Sousa, Gilmore And Pryor and ending with Music Of The Movies. The September 1, 1936, episode opened with Gypsy Love Song from Victor Herbert's The Fortune Teller and featured from the Broadway plays On Your Toes and Florodora.

The May 20, 1937, episode, the life of Thomas Edison, "Wizard of Menlo Park" aired. The Don Voorhees orchestra played.

The January 2, 1940, episode starred Burgess Meredith in the title role based on the life of Italian explorer, navigator and popular author Amerigo Vespucci with Marquis James, Carl Carmer, and Frank Monaghan. Don Voorhees directed. The February 13, episode featured Raymond Massey starring in which Robert E. Sherwood wrote an adaptation (radio transcript) of Carl Sandburg's Abraham Lincoln: The War Years, part of the six volume set of Lincoln's biography. The April 30, episode titled Thomas Paine starred Frank Readick.

The January 22, 1941, episode titled Life Of Emily Dickinson was broadcast on radio featuring Anne Sterrett. The March 31, episode has actor Paul Muni in the title role of the life of Edwin Booth. The April 7, episode Maxwell Anderson's Ode To A Nightingale was played. The August 4, episode that was broadcast on radio was Dr. Sara Josephine Baker. The October 13, episode titled Waters Of The Wilderness, starred Kay Francis which was based on Shirley Seifert's novel of the same name. The October 27, 1941, episode featured Claude Rains as Captain Paul from Edward Ellsberg's book Captain Paul. In November 1941, Drums Along The Mohawk was presented featuring Henry Fonda and They Died With Their Boots On featuring Errol Flynn. A week following the bombing of Pearl Harbor, The Great Man Vote featuring Orson Welles premiered. The December 22, episode was a repeat of its annual Christmas version of Marc Connelly's The Green Pastures featuring the Hall Johnson Choir and Juano Hernandez.

The February 2, 1942, episode titled Captains Of The Clouds debuted featuring James Cagney before the film was released on February 12, 1942.

The February 7, 1944, episode Prologue to Glory aired in honor of President Abraham Lincoln. Massey starred where it emanated at the Radio City Music Hall in New York City. Massey once again starred in Abraham Lincoln: The War Years and Abraham Lincoln. The March 2, episode titled The First Commando starred Alfred Drake and Everett Sloane. The March 13, episode had opera singer Patrice Munsel. The September 4, episode What Makes A Hero, was the story of corporal Jim Slaton. The November 6, episode titled Jane Adams Of Hull House (Note: Acctual spelling of her name is Jane Addams) was preempted for President Franklin D. Roosevelt's speech.

The February 5, 1945, episode starred Bing Crosby in a musical revue supported by the USO.

The September 29, 1947, episode Big Boy starred Brian Donlevy about Babe Ruth.

The October 4, 1948, episode Action At Santiag, starring John Dall and Robert Trout.

The February 28, 1950, episode Young Man In A Hurry told the story of Heinz Joseph Gerber's immigration to the United States, his determination to go to high school and graduate, go to college, and inventing the rubber ruler. The April 15 episode titled The Firefly Lamp starred William Holden and how Norfolk and Western Railway was built. The December 17, episode titled Spindletop with stars Robert Cummings and Teresa Wright.

=== Notable cast ===
This is the cast listing according to The Concise Encyclopedia of American Radio. Actor, announcer, and Game show host Bud Collyer remembered his time on the show. Other announcers were on the show. Hans Conried was in eight radio performances.

Narrator
- Walter Huston
Announcers
- Bud Collyer
- Bill Hamilton
- Gabriel Heatter
- Ross Martin
- Ted Pearson
- Basil Ruysedael
- Frank Singiser
- Gayne Whitman
Actors
- Walter Brennan
- Ray Collins
- Hans Conried
- Ted de Corsia
- Kenny Delmar
- Ross Elliott
- Cary Grant
- Gary Gray
- Ted Jewett
- Raymond Edward Johnson
- Bill Johnstone
- John McIntire
- Agnes Moorehead
- Dennis Morgan
- Jeanette Nolan
- Tyrone Power
- Frank Readick
- Ronald Reagan
- Stafford Repp
- Mickey Rooney
- Luis van Rooten
- Everett Sloane
- Jack Smart
- Paul Stewart
- Karl Swenson
- Orson Welles

=== Advertising ===
DuPont, a chemical corporation that did not sell public goods, sponsored Cavalcade of America and integrated their company slogan and agenda into the inspirational and pro-American achievement themes of each episode.

A world-class PR firm helped DuPont shake the "merchant of death" label, and it remained a sponsor for a top radio program.

Cavalcade of America was an early exercise in corporate image-building. DuPont promoted itself as a hero for America. This type of propaganda was shrewd but effective; it put a corporate image behind the real-life heroes that lived a century before. One way DuPont was able to emphasize its own products in episodes of Cavalcade of America was by having health-related episodes that promoted the use of chemical-compound products manufactured by DuPont. This was not necessarily advertising, since individuals could not go to the store and purchase these chemical items.

According to DuPont public relations executives, the goal was not to directly sell their products, but rather to explain the company's goals and foster the confidence, respect and goodwill of the public. By recreating little-known events in the lives of historically respected Americans through dramatizations, Cavalcade of America caused listeners to associate DuPont's products with patriotism and self-reliance. The series also gave history and chemistry more prestige than it would have otherwise had. By making the show thrilling, but not over-sensationalized, DuPont was able to better its own branding and get away from being perceived as a military-only company.

==== Nylon show ====
At the World's Fair in New York City in 1939, DuPont introduced nylon women's hosiery. On May 15, 1940, DuPont made nylon women's hosiery available to the public and began an advertising blitz. The day was designated "N-day" by DuPont's marketers, and an entire episode of Cavalcade of America was markedly different: DuPont selected a "typical" housewife to interview G.P. Hoff, Director of Research of DuPont's Nylon Division. In the rigged interview, Hoff expounded at length on the virtues of nylon. Eager to purchase nylon hose, thousands of women waited in lines for department stores to open the following morning. 750,000 nylons had been manufactured for N-Day, but all were sold on the first day they went on sale.

=== Awards ===
In August 1952, Cavalcade of America was nominated for the American Legion Auxiliary award for the third consecutive year. In February 1954, DuPont won the Freedoms Foundation award with the Firestone Tire & Rubber Company.

== Television ==
Cavalcade of America
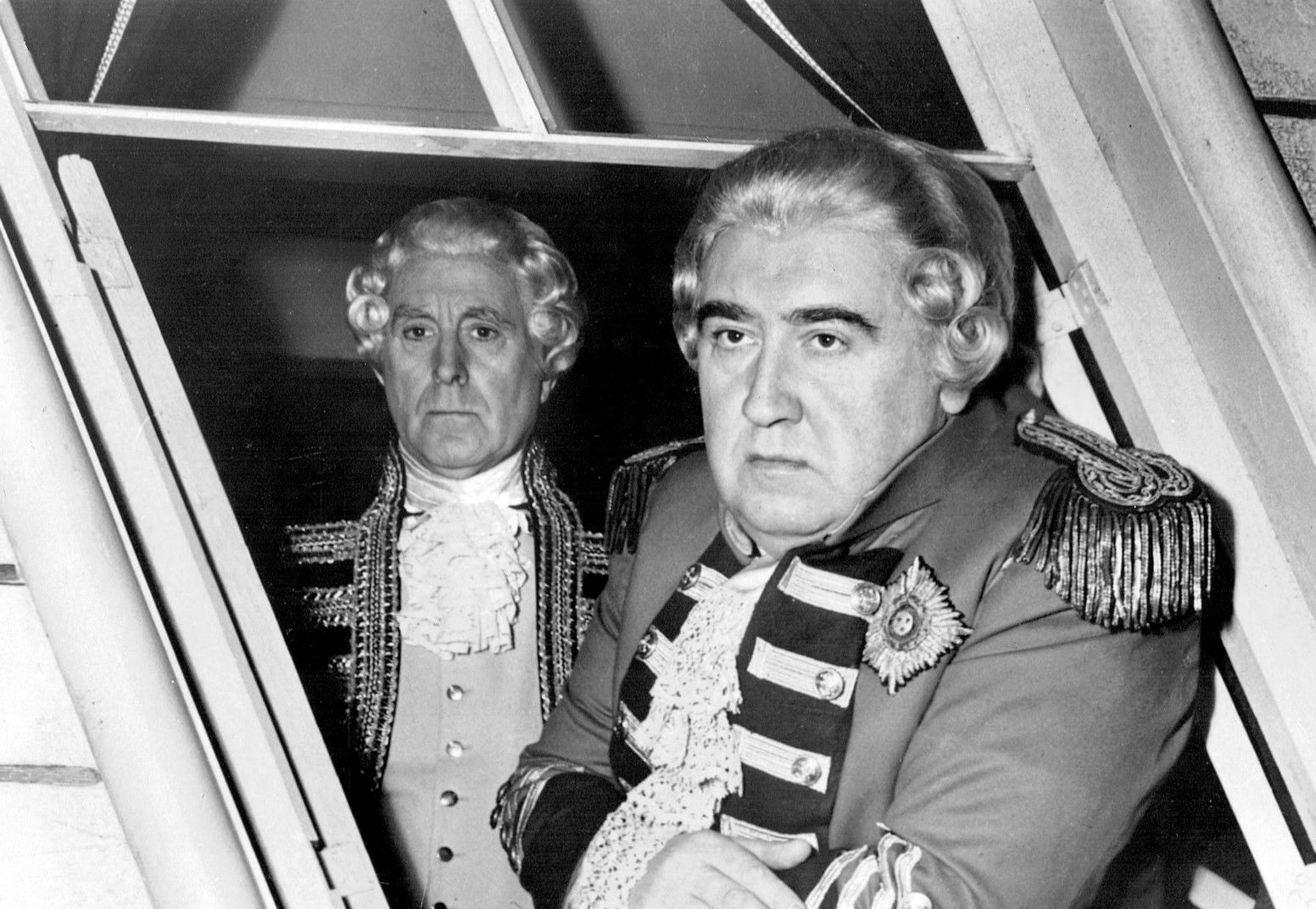
- Francis L. Sullivan and Richard Avonde in "Margin for Victory", 1954
- Genre: Anthology drama
- Based on: Cavalcade of America by Roy S. Durstine's radio series
- Directed by: Robert Stevenson; László Benedek; Peter Godfrey; John Brahm; William A. Seiter; Harry Horner
- Starring: Numerous Broadway and Hollywood stars
- Theme music composer: Josef Zimanich
- Country of origin: United States
- Original language: English
- No. of seasons: 5
- No. of episodes: 131

Production
- Executive producers: Don Sharpe; Jacques Braunstein
- Producers: Warren Lewis; Jack Chertok; Jack Denove; Gilbert Ralston; Arthur Ripley
- Running time: 25 minutes
- Production companies: Leonard Freeman Productions; CBS Productions

Original release
- Network: NBC
- Release: October 1, 1952 – June 24, 1953
- Network: ABC
- Release: September 29, 1953 – March 30, 1957

In the 1950s, DuPont switched its advertising strategy from radio to television, and Cavalcade of America became a television series mainly produced by Jack Chertok. One hundred and thirty-one episodes were aired over five seasons between 1952 and 1957. During a six-month period, the television and radio series overlapped. The show was telecast on both NBC (1952–53) and ABC (1953–57). It was renamed DuPont Cavalcade Theater in August 1955, and it was known as DuPont Theater during its last year. In the 1957 fall season, it was replaced by DuPont Show of the Month, a 90-minute live dramatization of popular novels and short stories or abridged versions of films and plays. That series ran until 1961.

Many kinescopes of Cavalcade of America survive at the UCLA Film and Television Archive.

The first episode of Cavalcade of America was Poor Richard which debuted on October 1, 1952. In season 3, episode 23 Sunrise On A Dirty Face the American juvenile justice system was established in 1899 in Cook County, Illinois. In Season 3, episode 25, The Palmetto Conspiracy, Detective Allan Pinkerton allegedly sets out to stop an assiassination attempt on President-elect Abraham Lincoln. Season 4, episode 25, The Major of St. Lo deals with the events of the Battle of Saint-Lô where Major Thomas D. Howie lost his life.

=== Cast members with 4 or more appearances ===
Name	Num of ep
Robert Foulk	8
James Seay	8
Richard Gaines	7
Raymond Greenleaf	7
Dayton Lummis	6
Harlan Warde	6
Morris Ankrum	5
James Best	5
Robert Cornthwaite	5
Everett Glass	5
John Hamilton	5
Harry Harvey Sr.	5
Louis Jean Heydt	5
John Hoyt	5
Paul Keast	5
Hugh Sanders	5
Donald Murphy	5
Rhys Williams	5
Stephen Wootton	5
Willis Bouchey	4
Edgar Buchanan	4
Claire Carleton	4
Booth Colman	4
Walter Coy	4
Emlen Davies	4
John Dodsworth	4
Ross Elliott	4
Sam Flint	4
Nancy Hale	4
Richard Hale	4
Pitt Herbert	4
Robin Hughes	4
Morgan Jones	4
Lamont Johnson	4
Stacy Keach Sr.	4
Don Kennedy	4
Maurice Marsac	4
Howard Negley	4
Susan Odin	4
Patrick O'Moore	4
James Parnell	4
Carl Benton Reid	4
Roy Roberts	4
Dan White	4

=== Episodes ===
Seasons of Cavalcade of America
Season	Episodes	Originally released			Day	Time
Season	Episodes	First released	Last released	Network	Day	Time
1	20	October 1, 1952	June 24, 1953	NBC	Wednesdays	8:30–9 P. M.
2	33	September 29, 1953	June 22, 1954	ABC	Tuesdays	7:30–8 P. M.
3	26	October 12, 1954	June 21, 1955	ABC	Tuesdays	9:30–10 P. M.
4	25	September 13, 1955	June 5, 1956	ABC	Tuesdays	9:30–10 P. M.
5	27	September 18, 1956	March 30, 1957	ABC	Tuesdays	9:30–10 P. M.

==== Season 1 (1952–53) ====
No. overall	No. in season	Title	Directed by	Written by	Original release date
1	1	"Poor Richard"	Peter Godfrey	Frederick Jackson & Arthur Ripley	October 1, 1952
Benjamin Franklin delays the conference between Lord Howe and John Adams (Greer) so George Washington can disengage his troops from Long Island. Guest stars: Henry Brandon, Leo Britt, Roy Darmour, Dabbs Greer, Cecil Kellaway, Alan Napier, Patrick O'Moore, Tudor Owen, Hilda Plowright, and Almira Sessions
2	2	"All's Well with Lydia"	Arthur Ripley	Frederick Jackson	October 15, 1952
Lydia Darragh (Warrick) gains information instrumental in an American victory. Guest stars: William Bakewell, Phil Chambers, Esther Dale, Reginald Denny, John Dodsworth, John Downey, Everett Glass, Burt Mustin, and Ruth Warrick
3	3	"The Man Who Took a Chance"	Jules Bricken	Catherine Turney	October 29, 1952
Eli Whitney's (Denning) life is examined and interchangeable parts for riffles are invented. Guest stars: Harry Cheshire, Richard Denning, Byron Foulger, Thurston Hall, John Litel, Lewis Martin, and Rhys Williams
4	4	"A Romance to Remember"	Jules Bricken	David Dortort	November 12, 1952
Nathaniel Hawthorne (O'Herlihy) is inspired to write. Guest stars: Fay Baker, Mary Alan Hokanson, Dayton Lummis, Dan O'Herlihy, Katherine Warren, and Helen Westcott
5	5	"What God Hath Wrought"	Jules Bricken	Story by : Teleplay by : Richard Blake	November 26, 1952
Samuel Morse (Franz) invents the first telegraph. Guest stars: Steven Clark, Edward Earle, Eduard Franz, Don Gibson, Tom Henry, Earl Lee, Ilsa Mader, and Frank Wilcox
6	6	"No Greater Love"	Wilhelm Thiele	Tom Seller	December 10, 1952
Nurse Clara Louise Maass (Anderson) volunteers herself for research in the disease yellow fever. Guest stars: Mary Anderson, David Bond, Arthur Franz, and Reed Hadley
7	7	"In This Crisis"	Robert Stevenson	David Dortort	December 24, 1952
John Honeyman, (Tully) an American spy and British informant for George Washington (Gaines), gets important information about the Hessians. Guest stars: Ann Doran, Richard Gaines, Harry Harvey, John Hoyt, and Tom Tully
8	8	"The Arrow and the Bow"	Arthur Ripley	Frederick Jackson	January 7, 1953
President Andrew Johnson's (McClory) life is examined. Guest stars: Frances Bavier, Booth Colman, Sean McClory, Elena Verdugo, and O.Z. Whitehead
9	9	"What Might Have Been"	John English	Warner Law	January 21, 1953
Jefferson Davis (Ford) courts Sarah Knox Taylor (Hale). Guest stars: Robert Barrat, Ross Ford, Nancy Hale, and Dayton Lummis
10	10	"New Salem Story"	Jules Bricken	DeWitt Bodeen	February 4, 1953
Abraham Lincoln (Griffith) courts Ann Rutledge (Donnell). Guest stars: Lloyd Corrigan, Jeff Donnell, James Griffith, Louis Jean Heydt, and Kathryn Card
11	11	"A Matter of Honor"	Arthur Hilton	Van Norcross	February 18, 1953
The drama between Sam Houston (Stevens) and Eliza Houston (Stuart) plays out. Houston resigns from the governorship of Tennessee as a result. Guest stars: Stanley Andrews, Richard Bartell, Jonathan Hale, Preston Hanson, Taylor Holmes, Onslow Stevens, Randy Stuart, and Pierre Watkins
12	12	"Experiment at Monticello"	Jules Bricken	Brown Holmes	March 4, 1953
President Thomas Jefferson (Rhodes) volunteers himself to be inoculated with the germs of small pox. Guest stars: Morgan Farley, Raymond Greenleaf, John Hamilton, Donald Randolph, Grandon Rhodes, and Barbara Woodell
13	13	"Mightier Than the Sword"	Wilhelm Thiele	Tom Seller	March 18, 1953
With the trial and acquittal of John Peter Zenger, his lawyers worked to uphold the freedom of the press in Colonial America. Guest stars: John Alvin, Whit Bissell, John Doucette, John Eldredge, Byron Foulger, Eduard Franz, John Hamilton, Harry Harvey, Earle Hodgins, Douglas Kennedy, Adele Longmire, Robert Rockwell, and Hayden Rorke
14	14	"The Indomitable Blacksmith"	Wilhelm Thiele	Warner Law	April 1, 1953
Thomas Davenport (Connor) invents the electric motor. Guest stars: Harris Brown, Whitfield Connor, John Dehner, Frank Ferguson, Robert Foulk, Kathleen Freeman, Paul Keast, Kenneth MacDonald, Geraldine Wall, Katherine Warren, and Peggy Webber
15	15	"The Gingerbread Man"	Robert Stevenson	Robert Stevenson	April 15, 1953
Hessian soldiers desert the British Army during the American Revolutionary War. Guest stars: Edith Angold, Tony Christian, Richard Gaines, John Hamilton, Skelton Knaggs, Otto Waldis, John Wengraf, and William Yetter Jr.
16	16	"Night Strike"	Robert Stevenson	Robert Stevenson	April 29, 1953
John Paul Jones (Langan) tries to invade England with the American Navy. Guest stars: Glenn Langan, Richard Garrick, James Best, Russell Simpson, Maurice Marsac, Robert Edward Osterloh, Dayton Lummis, Dorothea Wolbert, Norman Dupont, John Fraser, Kenneth Donald Murray, Harry Wilson, and Hank Mann
17	17	"Slater's Dream"	Wilhelm Thiele	John Thiele, Wilhelm Thiele, & Charles Larson	May 13, 1953
Samuel Slater (Kilburn) brings British textile technology to the United States, modifying it for American use. Guest stars: Harvey B. Dunn, Robert Foulk, James Guilfoyle, Mary Ellen Kay, and Terence Kilburn
18	18	"The Pirate's Choice"	Wilhelm Thiele	Curtis Kenyon & David P. Sheppard	May 27, 1953
Pirate Jean Lafitte (Bishop) joins General Andrew Jackson to defend New Orleans from the British Army and Navy in 1814–15. Guest stars: Morris Ankrum, Sig Arno, Ben Astar, William Bishop, Douglas Evans, Jim Hayward, Gladys Hurlbut, Peter Mamakos, Donna Martell, James Seay, Mario Siletti, Philip Tonge, and Rhys Williams
19	19	"John Yankee"	Wilhelm Thiele	Charles Larson	June 10, 1953
John Adams (Connor) defends eight English soldiers before the American Revolutionary War begins. Guest stars: John Alderson, Whitfield Connor, Watson Downs, Robert Neil, Norman Field, Lowell Gilmore, Raymond Greenleaf, Harry Harvey, Teddy Infuhr, Paul Keast, Nolan Leary, Patrick O'Moore, Emory Parnell, and Helen Parrish
20	20	"The Tenderfoot"	Wilhelm Thiele	Tom Seller	June 24, 1953
Teddy Roosevelt (Brown) goes west to capture three outlaws in the Dakota Bad Lands during a blizzard. Guest stars: Tom Brown, Edgar Buchanan, Robert Cornthwaite, John Kellogg, Nolan Leary, Ludwig Stössel, Lee Van Cleef, and James Young

==== Season 2 (1953–54) ====
No. overall	No. in season	Title	Directed by	Written by	Original release date
21	1	"Sam and the Whale"	Tim Whelan	George H. Faulkner	September 29, 1953
Sam Mulford (Kellaway) disagrees with taxes on whales so he goes to England to see the British Royal Court. Guest stars: Evelyn Ankers, Charles Cane, Russ Conklin, John Dodsworth, Rex Evans, Robert Foulk, Arthur Gould-Porter, Alec Harford, Cecil Kellaway, Doris Lloyd, Don Megowan, Charles Nolte, and Ben Wright
22	2	"The Stolen General"	Robert Stevenson	Arthur Ripley	October 6, 1953
Lieutenant-general Richard Prescott (Denny) meets up with Dorothea Meadows (Billingsley) in Rhode Island unbeknownst Colonel William Barton (Abbott) is waiting for him. (Note: Fictional as Barton captured Prescott on Prescott Farm.) Guest stars: Reginald Denny, John Abbott, Barbara Billingsley, John Dodsworth, Rex Evans, Walter Kingsford, and Ben Wright
23	3	"Breakfast at Nancy's"	Sidney Salkow	George H. Faulkner	October 13, 1953
While hiding a messenger beneath the floor of her cabin in Georgia, Nancy Hart (Blake) is forced to protect the messenger when tories come to her cabin. Guest stars: Amanda Blake, Frank Christi, Noreen Corcoran, Bobby Hyatt, Charles McGraw, and Bill Phipps
24	4	"Sunset at Appomattox"	Robert Stevenson	Robert Stevenson	October 20, 1953
The 1865 meeting of General Robert E. Lee and General Ulysses S. Grant at Appomattox happens. Guest stars: Robert Cornthwaite, Kenny Delmar, Robert Easton, William Johnstone, John Kellogg, Glenn Langan, Harry Morgan, Ralph Reed, Vernon Rich, Harlan Warde, Dan White, and Ian Wolfe
25	5	"And to Fame Unknown"	John M. Barnwell Jr.	E.R. Murkland	October 27, 1953
A high school teacher (Gladieux) helps students in science. Guest star: Rolland Gladieux
26	6	"A Time to Grow"	Wilhelm Thiele	Bill Bruckner	November 3, 1953
The Louisiana Territory is purchased from the French First Republic in 1803. Guest stars: William Bishop, Booth Colman, Raymond Greenleaf, Stacy Keach, Douglas Kennedy, Maurice Marsac, Torben Meyer, Roy Regnier, and John Wengraf
27	7	"The Tiger's Tail"	Robert Stevenson	N. Richard Nash	November 17, 1953
Cartoonist Thomas Nast (Cornthwaite) creates newspaper cartoons about the corruption of Boss Tweed. Guest stars: Robert Cornthwaite, Howard Freeman, William Haade, Paul Harvey, Earl Lee, Judy Osborne, Ray Teal, and Robert Warwick
28	8	"The Last Will of Daniel Webster"	Robert Stevenson	N. Richard Nash	November 24, 1953
Daniel Webster (Collins) reflects on his life while on his deathbed with friends surrounding him. Guest stars: Ray Collins, Ann Doran, Richard Gaines, Everett Glass, John Hamilton, Paul Harvey, and Carl Benton Reid
29	9	"Major Pauline"	Robert Stevenson	Robert Stevenson	December 1, 1953
During the American Civil War, Pauline Cushman (Michael) becomes a spy for the Union. Guest stars: Trevor Bardette, Richard Baumann, Fred Beir, Harry Cheshire, Robert Foulk, William Grueneberg, Michael Hall, John Holland, Dayton Lummis, Hank Mann, Gertrude Michael, and Robert Paige
30	10	"The Betrayal"	Wilhelm Thiele	Curtis Kenyon	December 8, 1953
General Benedict Arnold (O'Herlihy) defects from the Continental Army to the British Army by trying to give them West Point. Guest stars: Robert Clarke, Kirby Grant, Robin Hughes, Anthony Jochim, Betty Lynn, Dan O'Herlihy, Grandon Rhodes, Pierre Watkin, and Frank Wilcox
31	11	"The Riders of the Pony Express"	Robert Stevenson	Robert Stevenson	December 15, 1953
The Pony Express is explored from its beginnings to the end. Guest stars: Trevor Bardette, Howard Negley, Lewis Martin, Jonathan Hale, Robert Warwick, John Qualen, Robert Cornthwaite, Jim Hayward, Richard Bauman, Ralph Reed, and William Johnstone
32	12	"One Nation Indivisible"	Wilhelm Thiele	Warner Law	December 22, 1953
Horace Greeley (Buchanan) keeps his promise he made to President Abraham Lincoln (Ferguson) about former Confederate States of America President Jefferson Davis (Kimmell). Guest stars: Edgar Buchanan, Herbert Butterfield, Stephen Chase, Frank Ferguson, Raymond Greenleaf, Judd Holdren, Leslie Kimmell, James Parnell, Marion Ross, Lyle Talbot, Ferris Taylor, Fay Wray, and Will Wright
33	13	"Mr. Peale's Dinosaur"	Wilhelm Thiele	Bill Buckner & Charles Larson	December 29, 1953
Painter Charles Willson Peale (Gilmore) exhumes a mastodon. (Note: In Peale's time, a mastodon was called a mammoth.) Guest stars: Lowell Gilmore, Louis Jean Heydt, John Lupton, Anne O'Neal, Hayden Rorke, Lurene Tuttle, and Dan White
34	14	"G for Goldberger"	Wilhelm Thiele	Warner Law	January 12, 1954
Epidemiologist Joseph Goldberger's (Coy) studies on pellagra are ridiculed. Guest stars: Walter Coy, Emlen Davies, King Donovan, William Fawcett, William Forrest, Louis Jean Heydt, Ruth Lee, Dayton Lummis, William March, Adrienne Marden, Patrick O'Neal, John Phillips, Susan Seaforth Hayes, Abbe Starr, Anthony Sydes, Dennis Weaver, and Rhys Williams
35	15	"Smyrna Incident"	Robert Stevenson	Robert Stevenson	January 19, 1954
An Austrian-born prisoner seeking citizenship aboard an American ship may cause a battle in a Turkish port. Guest stars: Robert Cornthwaite, Everett Glass, Charles La Torre, Donald Murphy, Carl Benton Reid, Konstantin Shayne, Ted Stanhope, Albert Szabo, Otto Waldis, Mel Welles, and John Wengraf
36	16	"Man of Glass"	Wilhelm Thiele	Tom Seller	January 26, 1954
Henry William Stiegel's (Fafara) life is explored. Guest stars: John Anderson, Harris Brown, Phil Chambers, John Eldredge, Charles Evans, Tiger Fafara, Charles Meredith, Carl Benton Reid, Robert Strauss, and June Whitley
37	17	"The Plume of Honor"	George Archainbaud	Paul Gangelin	February 9, 1954
Francis Kinloch Huger (Bauman) and Erich Bollman (Winter) attempt to rescue Marquis de Lafayette (Marsac) from detention in Olomouc. Guest stars: John Banner, Richard H. Bauman, Gábor Curtiz, Maurice Marsac, Otto Reichow, Henry Rowland, Albert Szabo, and Larry Winter
38	18	"Margin for Victory"	Arthur Ripley	Arthur Ripley	February 16, 1954
Abraham Woodhull and Anna Strong (The Culpers) allow reinforcements to come to Newport, Colony of Rhode Island and Providence Plantations by making the British think the city of New York would be invaded by the Patriots. Guest stars: Edward Ashley, Richard Avonde, Myrna Fahey, Richard Gaines, John Hoyt, Scott Lee, John Patrick, and Francis L. Sullivan
39	19	"The Absent Host"	Sidney Salkow	Russell S. Hughes	March 2, 1954
When Thomas Jefferson is not home at Monticello, the British Army fails in capturing him. Guest stars: James Adamson, Charles Bastin, Leo Britt, John Doucette, Gil Herman, Jimmy Horan, Robin Hughes, Don Kennedy, Howard Negley, Nestor Paiva, John Patrick, James Seay, and William Tannen
40	20	"Duel at the O.K. Corral"	Wilhelm Thiele	Bill Bruckner	March 9, 1954
Wyatt Earp tries to defend the cities of Dodge City, Kansas, Deadwood, South Dakota, and Tombstone, Arizona in the American frontier. Guest stars: Jim Bannon, Peter Hansen, Morgan Jones, Fred Libby, Pierce Lyden, Harry Morgan, Keith Richards, Lyle Talbot, Kenneth Tobey, Lee Van Cleef, and Alan Wells
41	21	"The Splendid Dream"	Wilhelm Thiele	Paul Gangelin & Charles Larson	March 16, 1954
The life of William Penn (Carroll) is explored. Guest stars: Leo G. Carroll, Mark Dana, Lisa Daniels, John Dodsworth, Leonard Mudie, and Richard Stapley
42	22	"Young Andy Jackson"	Robert Stevenson	Robert Stevenson	March 23, 1954
Andrew Jackson (Gray) joins the South Carolina militia and engages the British military forces. Guest stars: Douglass Dumbrille, Billy Gray, William Haade, Fiona Hale, Robin Hughes, Orley Lindgren, Tom McKee, Mabel Paige, Richard Reeves, and Russell Simpson
43	23	"Escape: The Story of Carl Schurz"	George Archainbaud	Paul Gangelin	March 30, 1954
Carl Schurz (Alpert) escapes Prussia while on his way he makes stops in Paris and London and finally immigrating to the United States. Guest stars: David R. Alpert, Ashley Cowan, Dabbs Greer, Virginia Lee, Frances Morris, Robert A. Paquin, and Lawrence Ryle
44	24	"Riddle of the Seas"	Wilhelm Thiele	William Bruckner	April 6, 1954
After breaking his right leg preventing him from being on United States Navy vessels, Matthew Fontaine Maury (Johnson) becomes an oceanographer studying naval meteorology, navigation, and charting the winds and ocean currents. Guest stars: Sheila Clark, Len Hendry, John Hoyt, Lamont Johnson, Roy Roberts, Laura Elliot, and John Stephenson
45	25	"Crazy Judah"	Lewis R. Foster	Lewis R. Foster	April 13, 1954
Theodore Judah (Elliott) builds the transcontinental railroad system. Guest stars: Ray Bennett, Robert Carson, Ross Elliott, Gene Foley, William O'Neal, Frances Rafferty, Hugh Sanders, Forrest Taylor, Beverly Washburn, and Frank Wilcox
46	26	"A Strange Journey"	Robert Stevenson	Robert Stevenson	April 20, 1954
Following the invasion of colonial Virginia, the British Army planned a daring scheme to abduct Thomas Jefferson. Guest stars: George Baxter, Barry Bernard, Harry Cording, Walter Coy, John Dierkes, Robert Easton, Richard Gaines, Art Gilmore, Arthur Gould-Porter, Bernie Gozier, Fred Keating, Walter Kingsford, Mitchell Kowall, Lester Matthews, Rodd Redwing, Dick Rich, Hugh Sanders, Harlan Warde, Mack Williams, and Will Wright
47	27	"The Paper Sword"	Wilhelm Thiele	Curtis Kenyon, Charles Larson, & David Stephenson	April 27, 1954
James King of William (O'Neal) uses the San Francisco Evening Bulletin to crusade against political corruption. Guest stars: Hugh Beaumont, Margaret Field, Leo Gordon, Harry Harvey, Pitt Herbert, Barry Kelly, Bill Kennedy, Don Kennedy, Patrick O'Neal, Stuart Randall, Tracey Roberts, Hugh Sanders, and Barbara Woodell
48	28	"Saturday Story"	Francis D. Lyon	Joel Murcott & Merwin Gerard	May 4, 1954
High school coach Mark Wilson teaches Graham skills in football. Guest stars: Frank Leahy, Otto Graham, Dabbs Greer, Joyce Mackenzie, Ralph Moody, Charles Meredith, George Wallace, Richard Shackleton, and Morgan Jones
49	29	"Spindletop: Texas' First Oil Gushers"	Robert G. Walker	Winston Miller	May 11, 1954
Spindletop in 1901 starts the Texas oil boom. Guest stars: Chris Alcaide, Stanley Andrews, William Bishop, Richard Eyer, Russell Gaige, Richard Gaines, Nancy Hale, Coulter Irwin, Renny McEvoy and Burt Mustin
50	30	"Moonlight School"	Wilhelm Thiele	Louella MacFarlane	May 18, 1954
Cora Wilson Stewart (Davies) opens up a Moonlight School in Rowan County, Kentucky to help educate illiterate adults learn. Guest stars: Bonnie Bidy, Lon Chaney Jr., Emlen Davies, Edith Evanson, Mary Field, Pitt Herbert, George Nader, Harry Shannon, Houseley Stevenson, Gloria Talbot, and Stephen Wootton
51	31	"Cat with the Crimson Eyes"	John Brahm	Bernard C. Schoenfeld	May 25, 1954
If newspaper editors in Colonial America spoke against certain people, they were tried in court where freedom of the press was under fire. Guest stars: Jan Arvan, Claudia Barrett, Richard Benedict, Eugene Iglesias, Charles McGraw, and Rita Moreno
52	32	"The Skipper's Lady"	Wilhelm Thiele	William Sackheim & David Stephenson	June 8, 1954
A woman races to stop an Indian uprising. Guest stars: Sally Brophy, Paul Langton, Lee Van Cleef, Harvey Stephens, Harry Bartell, Houseley Steven, John Picard, and Paul Keast
53	33	"Courage in Connecticut"	Wilhelm Thiele	Warner Law	June 22, 1954
Before the American Revolutionary War, many struggle for liberty. Guest stars: Morris Ankrum, Booth Colman, Raymond Greenleaf, John Hoyt, Paul Keast, Anne Kimbell, Donald Lawton, Sean McClory, Keith McConnell, and Patrick O'Moore

==== Season 3 (1954–55) ====
No. overall	No. in season	Title	Directed by	Written by	Original release date
54	1	"The Great Gamble"	Wilhelm Thiele	Warner Law	October 12, 1954
Cyrus W. Field (Connor) lays the first telegraph cable across the Atlantic Ocean. Guest stars: Florenz Ames, Whitfield Connor, Logan Field, Marjorie Lord, Robert Middleton, Susan Odin, Herbert Rudley, and Harry Shannon
55	2	"The Forge"	Wilhelm Thiele	Warner Law	October 26, 1954
Eliphalet Remington II's (Nader) life is explored and the invention of the rifle barrel. Guest stars: Richard Bartell, Kathleen Crowley, Bill Kennedy, Madge Meredith, George Nader, Vernon Rich, Walter Sande, James Seay, Russell Simpson, and Roland Varno
56	3	"Moonlight Witness"	Maurice Geraghty	Maurice Geraghty	November 2, 1954
Abraham Lincoln (Bennett) defends the son of a childhood friend. Guest stars: Bruce Bennett, Rhys Williams, Claire Du Brey, Ralph Reed, Michael Hall, Robert Quarry, Jonathan Hale, Byron Foulger, Sam Flint, Mel Ford, Jimmie Dodd, John Force, and Frank Jaquet
57	4	"The Gentle Conqueror"	Wilhelm Thiele	Tom Seller	November 9, 1954
Franciscan Order missionary Junípero Serra comes to New Spain and arrives in Alta California in 1769. Guest stars: Wilton Graff, Donald Randolph, Lamont Johnson, Ted de Corsia, Alan Wells, Chief Yowlachie, Rico Alaniz, Richard Beymer, David Bond, Rus Conklin, Dorothy Sky Eagle, Pitt Herbert, Gil Warren, and Tom Tamaras
58	5	"Mountain Man"	Robert G. Walker	Paul Franklin	November 16, 1954
On the way to Alta California, James Ohio Pattie (Picerni) and his father, Sylvester, are arrested and arrive in San Diego in 1828 where José María de Echeandía imprisons them and their party for forged passports. James recounts their adventures to John Bradshaw. Guest stars: Edward Colmans, Eugenia Paul, Paul Picerni, Guy Prescott, Keith Richards, and Gregory Walcott
59	6	"The American Thanksgiving: Its History and Meaning"	Robert Stevenson	George Faulkner & Robert Stevenson	November 23, 1954
Thanksgiving is explored during George Washington and Abraham Lincoln's time respectively. Guest stars: Marshall Bradford, Alec Campbell, Marilyn Carroll, Walter Coy, Ann Doran, Richard Gaines, Herbert Heyes, Larry Johns, Doris Kemper, John McGovern, Dick Rich, Harvey Stephens, Venetia Stevenson, Regis Toomey, Helen Van Tuyl, Harlan Warde, and Stephen Wootton
60	7	"Ordeal In Burma"	Wilhelm Thiele	Charles Larson	November 30, 1954
American missionaries, Ann (Gerry) and Adoniram Judson (Murphy), helped to end the First Anglo-Burmese War of 1824. Guest stars: Argentina Brunetti, Danny Chang, Peter Chong, Noel Drayton, Toni Gerry, Quon Gong, Weaver Levy, Shirley Lew, Richard Loo, Keye Luke, Donald Murphy, and Kam Tong
61	8	"Night Call"	Robert Stevenson	Lawrence B. Marcus	December 7, 1954
A dramatization of a typical day in a doctor's professional and personal life. Guest stars: Richard H. Bauman, Sheila Bromley, Harry Brown, Paul E. Burns, Alice Drake, Nancy Hale, Coulter Irwin, Dean Jagger, Doris Kemper, Scott Lee, Alyn Lockwood, Rory Mallinson, Muriel Mansell, Claire Meade, Donald Murphy, Fred Sherman, and Jill St. John
62	9	"A Medal For Miss Walker"	Wilhelm Thiele	William Sackheim	December 14, 1954
Surgeon, abolitionist, prohibitionist, spy, and prisoner of war in the American Civil War, Mary Edwards Walker's (Murphy) life is explored and the only woman to date to receive the Congressional Medal of Honor. Guest stars: Taggart Casey, James Diehl, Frank Ferguson, John Hamilton, Pitt Herbert, Dennis Hopper, DeForest Kelley, Maura Murphy, Walter Reed, Roy Roberts, Hugh Sanders, and Alan Wells
63	10	"A Man's Home"	Harry Horner	Eugene Vale	December 28, 1954
James Otis (Elliott), an advocate general to the British crown in Colonial America, steps down in protest of British troops going into American homes unwanted. Guest stars: James Best, Hillary Brooke, Ross Elliott, Anthony Eustrel, Everett Glass, Dorothy Green, William Haade, Lumsden Hare, Frank Kreig, Richard Peel, and Emerson Treacy
64	11	"The Marine Who Was 200 Years Old"	Robert Stevenson	Lawrence B. Marcus	January 4, 1955
52 year old Leland "Lou" Diamond (Bond), a U. S. Marine master gunnery sergeant refuses to leave his post during World War II at the Battle of Guadalcanal after being sick. Guest stars: Ward Bond, John Cliff, Herbert Deans, James Flavin, Alex Frazer, Steve Hayes, Mary Alan Hokanson, John McGovern, Richard Newton, Jimmy Ogg, Gregg Palmer, Gene Reed, Bing Russell, Norma Varden, and Larry Winter
65	12	"A Message From Garcia"	Wilhelm Thiele	Charles Larson	January 18, 1955
First lieutenant Andrew Summers Rowan (Murphy) in the United States Army risks his life as a spy in the Spanish–American War to help General Calixto García (Baguez) free Cuba of Colonial rule by Spain. Guest stars: Salvador Baguez, Sheryl Gallaway, Peter Mamakos, Alberto Mariscal, Alex Montoya, Donald Murphy, George Navarro, James Seay, Jonathan Seymour, Randy Stuart, Phil Tead, James Todd, and Murvyn Vye
66	13	"Petticoat Doctor"	Wilhelm Thiele	Story by : William Sackheim, Charles Larson, & Jack Bennett; Teleplay by : Jack Bennett	January 25, 1955
Elizabeth Blackwell (Raymond) becomes the United States first woman physician. Guest stars: Willis Bouchey, Edgar Buchanan, Betty Caulfield, Mike Dengate, Byron Foulger, Sherry Jackson, Don Kennedy, David Post, Paula Raymond, Minerva Urecal, Dan White and Mary Young
67	14	"Take Off Zero"	Charles Bennett	Harold Shumate	February 1, 1955
Lt. James Francis Coleman (Johnson) test pilots the Convair XFY Pogo. Guest stars: Edgar Dearing, James Flavin, Lamont Johnson, Nelson Leigh, Fred Libby, Alyn Lockwood, Marjorie Lord, Rory Mallinson, Steve Pendleton, and James Seay
68	15	"Decision For Justice"	Wilhelm Thiele	Story by : Samuel Rice; Teleplay by : Charles Larson	February 15, 1955
One of the few who have held constitutional office in all three branches of the United States federal government, John Marshall's (Morrow) life is explored. Guest stars: Phil Chambers, Robert Foulk, Marjorie Lord, Dayton Lummis, Jeff Morrow, Ralph Reed, Addison Richards, Hayden Rorke, Howard Wendell, and Anne Whitfield
69	16	"The Hostage"	Charles Bennett	Harold Shumate	February 22, 1955
Captain Robert Stobo (Langan) of the Virginia militia during the French and Indian War. Following the Battle of the Great Meadows, he and Captain Jacob Van Braam (Adams) were prisoners-of-war in 1754. Guest stars: Peter Adams, Paul Bryar, Peter Camlin, Iron Eyes Cody, Suzanne Dalbert, Claudia Drake, Abel Fernandez, Glenn Langan, Laurette Luez, Maurice Marsac, Gene Roth, Paul Sorensen, Liam Sullivan, and Phil Tead
70	17	"That They Might Live"	Robert Stevenson	Gwen Bagni	March 8, 1955
Pediatrition Abraham Jacobi and physician, teacher, scientist, writer, and suffragist Mary Putnam Jacobi bring light to prenatal and child care. Guest stars: Peter Adams, Louise Arthur, Booth Colman, Emlen Davies, Claire Du Brey, Paul Harvey, Louis Jean Heydt, Natalie Norwick, William Pullen, Norbert Schiller, Fred Sherman, and Stephen Wootton
71	18	"Man On The Beat"	Wilhelm Thiele	Charles Larson	March 15, 1955
A day in the life of a city patrolman. Guest stars: Hal Baylor, Paul Bryar, William Campbell, Richard Crane, Constance Ford, Sara Harte, Grace Hayle, Stacy Keach Sr., Harry Lauter, Len Lesser, Joe McTurk, Vicente Padula, Jerome Sheldon, and Dorothea Wolbert
72	19	"The Ship That Shook The World"	Robert Stevenson	Robert Stevenson	March 29, 1955
The events leading up to the construction of the USS Monitor to fight the casemate ironclad CSS Virginia is explored. Guest stars: Don Beddoe, John Close, Willa Pearl Curtis, Ernest Dominy, Watson Downs, John Ericson, Alex Gerry, Richard Hale, Lumsden Hare, Archer MacDonald, Gregg Palmer, Carl Benton Reid, Robert Warwick, and Carleton Young
73	20	"The Gift Of Dr. Minot"	Charles Bennett	Lawrence B. Marcus	April 12, 1955
George Minot (Coy), a Boston medical researcher, sacrifices his own health to find a cure for pernicious anemia. Guest stars: Phyllis Coates. Walter Coy, Richard Erdman, Nancy Evans, Diane F. Ross, Don Shelton, Aline Towne, and Noel Toy
74	21	"How To Raise A Boy"	Lewis Foster	Edith Sommer & Robert Soderberg	April 26, 1955
A resentful teenage orphan visits a mid-western farm. Guest stars: Gordon Gebert, Tommy Ivo, Paul Kelly, George Marshall, Tyler McVey, Brad Morrow, Erin O'Brien-Moore, and Ferris Taylor
75	22	"Stay On, Stranger!"	Wilhelm Thiele	Jack Bennett	May 3, 1955
Alice Spencer Geddes Lloyd (Converse) moves from Boston to Caney Creek, Kentucky to educate children. Guest stars: Peggy Converse, Lon Chaney, Sallie Brophy, Edgar Buchanan, Adrienne Marden, Louise Lorimer, Florence Shaen, James Griffith, Steven Clark, Jeannine Ducasse, Bobby Diamond, Martin Dean, and Susan Odin
76	23	"Sunrise On A Dirty Face"	Wilhelm Thiele	Jack Laird	May 10, 1955
James E. West (Kelly) and Theodore Dreiser (Seay) establish the American juvenile justice system in the District of Columbia. (Note: The American juvenile justice system was established in 1899 in Cook County, Illinois.) Guest stars: Ben Bard, Olive Blakeney, Lois Collier, Raymond Greenleaf, Jack Kelly, Don Megowan, Marvin Miller, Patrick O'Moore, Peter Raynolds, Roy Roberts, and James Seay
77	24	"Six Hours To Deadline"	Jack Denove	Lawrence B. Marcus	May 24, 1955
A newspaper editor (McIntire) has issues with an article that may effect someone he respects. Guest stars: King Donovan, Sara Haden, Bonnie Henjum, Gladys Hurlbut, John McIntire, William Page, Helen Spring, Forrest Taylor, Ray Walker, and Will Wright
78	25	"The Palmetto Conspiracy"	Charles Bennett	Charles Bennett	June 7, 1955
Detective Allan Pinkerton (Watkin) stops an assassination attempt on President-elect Abraham Lincoln (Hale). (Note: Known as the Baltimore Plot.) Guest stars: Dorothy Bruce, Joseph J. Greene, Richard Hale, Howard Negley, Byron Palmer, John Pickard, Ric Roman, Pierre Watkin, Rhys Williams, and Rush Williams
79	26	"The Rescue Of Dr.Beanes"	Sobey Martin	Harold Shumate	June 21, 1955
The life of Francis Scott Key (Murphy) before he wrote the Star Spangled Banner. Guest stars: Donald Murphy, Paula Raymond, Byron Palmer, Anthony Eustrel, Griff Barnett, Barry Bernard, Jonathan Hale, Sam Flint, Christopher Dark, Robin Hughes, Philip Tonge, Clark Howat, Richard Reeves, Herbert Deans, John Irving, Kenneth Donald Murray, and Gordon Richards

==== Season 4 (1955–56) ====
No. overall	No. in season	Title	Directed by	Written by	Original release date
80	1	"A Time for Courage"	Robert G. Walker	Joel Murcott	September 13, 1955
Nancy Merki (Talbott) overcomes polio to become an Olympic swimmer. Guest stars: Hugh Beaumont, Gloria Talbott, Noreen Corcoran, (Note: Noreen Corcoran as Merki at age 9.) Pauline Moore, Emlen Davies, Don Dillaway, and Edgar Dearing
81	2	"The Texas Rangers"	Alvin Ganzer	Lawrence B. Marcus	September 27, 1955
John Barclay Armstrong (Davis) captures outlaw John Wesley Hardin (Talman). Guest stars: Erville Alderson, Harry Antrim, Malcolm Atterbury, Robert Clarke, Jim Davis, Lester Dorr, Edith Evanson, Glen Gordon, Gary Gray, Selmer Jackson, Emory Parnell, James Parnell, Barry Regan, William Talman, Ferris Taylor, and Robert Williams
82	3	"Toward Tomorrow"	John Meredyth Lucas	Story by : Richard Bluek & William Koenig; Teleplay by : Joel Murcott & John Meredyth Lucas	October 4, 1955
Ralph Bunche (Edwards) is appointed Ambassador to the United Nations. Guest stars: James Edwards, Ruby Goodwin, McHenry Norman, Maidie Norman, Bernie Hamilton, Morris D. Erby, Ron Hargrave, Gregory Walcott, Alan Reynolds, and Lee Erickson
83	4	"Disaster Patrol"	Charles Bennett	Charles Bennett	October 18, 1955
An earthquake makes in impossible to get supplies so an airplane pilot flies them in. Guest stars: Robert Anderson, Mark Barry, Diana Brewster, Steve Brodie, Fred Ford, Tim Johnson, Billy Lechner, Steve Pendleton, Jean Ruth, and Lyle Talbot
84	5	"The Swamp Fox"	Wilhelm Thiele	Robert Warnes Leach	October 25, 1955
Colonel Banastre Tarleton is sent to capture or kill Brigadier General Francis Marion (Conried) during the American Revolutionary War. Guest stars: Paul Brinegar, Hans Conried, Scott Forbes, Robert Foulk, Michael Garrett, Nancy Hadley, John Irving, Barry Kelley, Ron Randell, Addison Richards, and Kay Stewart
85	6	"A Chain of Hearts"	László Benedek	Story by : William Koenig & Richard Bluel; Teleplay by : Frederic Brady	November 1, 1955
A Polish seaman seeks United States citizenship. Guest stars: Charles Bronson, Joyce McCluskey, Robert Burton, Harlan Warde, Malcolm Atterberry, Alex Frazer, William Forrest, Felix Nelson, Rodney Bell, William Boyett, Stephen Coit, and Peter Brocco
86	7	"One Day at a Time"	László Benedek	Story by : William Koenig & Richard Bluel; Teleplay by : Lawrence B. Marcus	November 15, 1955
Bill Wilson and Bob Smith become friends and co–found Alcoholics Anonymous. Guest stars: James Daly, James Bell, John Litel, Barbara Eiler, Eve March, James Best, Hugh Sanders, Jack Reitzen, Nolan Leary, Robert Bice, Virginia Christine, Edward Earle, Sam Gilman, Charlotte Lawrence, Tyler McVey, and Napoleon Whiting
87	8	"Crisis in Paris"	Wilhelm Thiele	Jack Laird	November 29, 1955
Benjamin Franklin (St. John) travels to France for a treaty during the American Revolutionary War. Guest stars: Edgar Barrier, James Best, Whit Bissell, Robert Brubaker, Jack Chefe, Noel Drayton, Leslie Gray, Preston Hanson, Howard St. John,
88	9	"Doctor on Wheels"	John Meredyth Lucas	Story by : William Koenig & Richard Bluel; Teleplay by : John Meredyth Lucas	December 13, 1955
A student who has polio struggles to get through medical school. Guest stars: Lamont Johnson, Betty Lynn, Ed Kemmer, Harry Hickox, Marshall Bradford, Dan Barton, Jon Deere, Ike Jones, James Lilburn, Morgan Jones, and Donald Kirke
89	10	"Barbed Wire Christmas"	Robert Stevenson	Lawrence B. Marcus	December 20, 1955
Prisoners-of-war in a German prison camp during World War II celebrate Christmas. Guest stars: Alan Aric, Peter Bourne, John Bryant, Chuck Connors, Robert Ellis, Steven Geray, James Hong, John Hoyt, Strother Martin, Thomas Mitchell, Norbert Schiller, and Carleton Young
90	11	"Postmark: Danger"	Wilhelm Thiele	Jack Laird	December 27, 1955
A civilian supervisor extorts from parents of United States military personnel reported missing in action during the Korean War. Two postal inspectors expose the supervisor. Guest stars: Barry Atwater, Paul Birch, Whit Bissell, Claire Carleton, Taggart Casey, John Doucette, Scott Forbes, Byron Foulger, Jack Harris, Russell Johnson, Stacy Keach, Helen Mayon, and Jeanne Moody
91	12	"The Boy Who Walked to America"	László Benedek	Story by : Howard Singer, William Koenig & Richard Bluel; Teleplay by : Frederic Brady	January 3, 1956
A Korean child dreams of becoming a United States citizen. Guest stars: Danny Chang, Hugh Beaumont, John Dennis, John Stephenson, Virginia Stefan, George Pirrone, John Bryant, Tyler McVey, James Parnell, Steve Mitchell, Harry Harvey Jr., Gayle Kellogg, S. John Launer, Jerry Mickelsen, William Schallert, Grant Scott, Leon Tyler, and Stuart Whitman
92	13	"The Prison Within"	John Meredyth Lucas	Story by : David Dressler; Teleplay by : John Meredyth Lucas	January 17, 1956
After an actress' boyfriend is killed in the Korean War, she has a mental breakdown and is sent to prison for check kiting. Guest stars: Gloria Talbott, Claire Carleton, Edward Platt, Mark Damon, William Swan, Joi Lansing, Robert Bice, Don Rickles, Gertrude Graner, and Charles Victor
93	14	"Star and Shield"	Wilhelm Thiele	Story by : Irve Tunick (radio play); Teleplay by : Merwin Gerard	January 24, 1956
A policeman comes to the aid of a woman and her young grandchild. Guest stars: Cheryl Callaway, Mark Damon, Paul Engle, Harry Harvey, Joyce Holden, Gordon Jones, Joi Lansing, Harry Lauter, Jon Locke, William Newell, Elizabeth Patterson, Walter Sande, Reba Tassell, and Stephen Wootton
94	15	"The Secret Life of Joe Swedie"	Richard Kinon	Story by : Joseph N. Bell, William Koenig, & Richard Bluel; Teleplay by : Jack Bennett	February 7, 1956
A child psychotherapist helps confined children. Guest stars: Chick Chandler, Edward Platt, Linda Stirling, John Hensley, Sam Flint, Don Beddoe, Mary Alan Hokanson. Harrison Lewis, Louise Arthur, Susan Odin, John Close, John Doolittle, and Morgan Jones
95	16	"Call Home the Heart"	László Benedek	Jo Pagano	February 21, 1956
Carl G. Fisher (Roberts) develops the city of Miami Beach. Guest stars: Teru Shimada, Roy Roberts, James Seay, Donald Curtis, Kristine Miller, Chiyoko Baker, Don C. Harvey, Robert Karnes, and Richard James
96	17	"The Listening Hand"	Richard Kinon	Story by : William Koenig & Richard Bluel; Teleplay by : Dick Carr	March 6, 1956
A couple who have a baby are blind and deaf have problems with CPS. Guest stars: Barbara Eiler, John Craven, Edith Evanson, Morris Ankrum, Nan Boardman, Ruth Lee, Arthur Space, Thomas B. Henry, William Leicester, Aline Towne, John Alvin, Jack Carol, Jack Daly, Skipper W. Olsen, and Eddie Ryder
97	18	"A Life to Live By"	William A. Seiter	Story by : Melvin Durslag, William Koenig, & Richard Bluel; Teleplay by : Laszlo Gorog	March 20, 1956
A high school athlete is determined not to let his incurable disease stop him. Guest stars: John Ericson, Sally Fraser, Russ Conway, Chris Warfield, Alexander Campbell, and Shirley Bernard
98	19	"The Doll Who Found a Mother"	László Benedek	Story by : William Koenig & Richard Bluel; Teleplay by : Joel Murcott	April 3, 1956
A miserable child is introduced to a library that loans toys. Guest stars: Peggy Webber, Cheryl Callaway, Jeanette Nolan, Willis Bouchey, Mort Mills, Fred Sherman, Scotty Morrow, Sharron Manns, and James Parnell
99	20	"The Jackie Jensen Story"	Alvin Ganzer	Lou Rusoff	April 17, 1956
A junior high school coach (Elliott) helps beset teen Jackie Jensen. Guest stars: Jackie Jensen, Ross Elliott, B.G. Norman, (Note: As Jenson at age 13.) Gary Gray, (Note: As Jensen at age 16.) Vivi Janiss, Lorna Thayer, Stafford Repp, Skip Torgerson, John Close, Rickey Murray, and Jeff Froner
100	21	"Diplomatic Outpost"	Reginald LeBorg	Story by : John R. Roberts, William Koenig, & Richard Bluel; Teleplay by : John R. Roberts	May 1, 1956
An American diplomat in southeast Asia takes over a plane from two business men so that children van go to the hospital. Guest stars: John Hudson, Cynthia Stone, Willis Bouchey, Richard Loo, Robert Karnes, Frances Fong, Sammee Tong, Harlan Warde, Noel de Souza, Jean Wong, and Wendy Winkelman
101	22	"Danger at Clover Ridge"	Lewis R. Foster	Story by : William Koenig & Richard Bluel; Teleplay by : Al C. Ward	May 8, 1956
A man living in the mountains is blamed for a forest fire. Guest stars: Robert Horton, Harry Shannon, Gordon Mills, Jean Howell, Ray Teal, Howard Negley, Don Harvey, Maudie Prickett, Bing Russell, and Jesse Kirkpatrick
102	23	"Who Is Byington?"	Charles Bennett	Charles Bennett	May 22, 1956
A reporter helps rescue Union troops during the American Civil War Guest stars: Larry Blake, George Chandler, William Hayden, Anthony Jochim, Harry Morgan, Tom Powers, Alan Reynolds, Bing Russell, Dan Tobin, and Don Wilmot
103	24	"The Boy Nobody Wanted"	Richard Kinon	Story by : Winfred L. Van Atta & Gwendolen Sherman; Teleplay by : László Benedek	May 29, 1956
Two boys are playing, and one is accidentally killed. Guest stars: Virginia Gregg, Jean Inness, Roy Barcroft, John E. Crawford, Ron Hagerthy, James Nolan, Milton Frome, Mike Winkelman, and Don Ross
104	25	"The Major of St. Lo"	Lewis R. Foster	Story by : Cornelius Ryan, William Koenig, & Richard Bluel; Teleplay by : Al C. Ward	June 5, 1956
During the Battle of Saint-Lô, which took place between July 7 and 19, 1944, Major Thomas D. Howie (Graves) is killed by shrapnel during a mortar barrage after talking with Major General Charles H. Gerhardt (Ankrum). (Note: Actual events at the Battle of Saint-Lô.) Guest stars: Peter Graves, Nick Dennis, Morris Ankrum, Frank Gerstle, Robert Crosson, James Dobson, Stuart Whitman, Ed Kemmer, John Stephenson, Paul Sorensen, Julian Upton, Paul Grant, and Norman Bartold

==== Season 5 (1956–57) ====
No. overall	No. in season	Title	Directed by	Written by	Original release date
105	1	"Monument to a Young Man"	Tom Gries	Story by : William Koenig & Richard Bluel; Teleplay by : A.I. Bezzerides	September 18, 1956
A LAPD detective, school principal, and high school student help a younger student. Guest stars: Miguel Landa, Perry Lopez, John Beradino, Louise Lorimer, Michael Fox, Wayne Taylor, Joyce Stoner, Gil Frye, Valentin De Vargas, Frances Dominguez, Belle Mitchell, and Joan Lora
106	2	"A Bed of Roses"	John Meredyth Lucas	Story by : Ben Canfield, William Koenig, & Richard Bluel; Teleplay by : Ben Canfield	September 25, 1956
An engaged girl's parents disagree with her on wedding plans. Guest stars: Susan Kohner, Dick Foran, Greta Granstedt, James Lilburn, Kathryn Card, Arlen Stuart, Ottola Nesmith, Sam Flint, and Franklyn Farnum
107	3	"The People and General Glancy"	Alvin Ganzer	Frederick Brady	October 9, 1956
Gwinnett County, Georgia has its first hospital built. Guest stars: Minor Watson, Ruth Lee, Ruby Goodwin, Ralph Moody, Nancy Hale, Michael Garrett, Lillian Bronson, and Tim Graham
108	4	"Wild April"	Jack Denove	Story by : Walter Havighurst; Teleplay by : Arthur Ripley	October 16, 1956
The later stages of Johnny Appleseed's (McIntire) life is explored. Guest stars: John McIntire, Jesse White, Robert Wilke, Carolyn Kearney, Willis Bouchey, Paul E. Burns, Ellen Corby, Jim Hayward, Percy Helton, Louis Jean Heydt, and Paul Newlan
109	5	"The Hobo Kid"	George Archainbaud	Story by : Billie Davis, William Koenig, & Richard Bluel; Teleplay by : A.I. Bezzerides	October 23, 1956
Billie's parents do not accept schooling for her. Guest stars: Reba Waters, Caroline Craig, Robert Foulk, Adrienne Marden, Penny Carpenter, Melinda Casey, Sarah Selby, Richard Cutting, Louise Lorimer, Harlan Warde, Arthur Space, and Franklyn Farnum
110	6	"Date with a Stranger"	Anton Leader	Story by : Harry T. Madden, William Koenig, Richard Bluel; Teleplay by : Frederic Brady	October 30, 1956
A lady and a gentleman meet in Philadelphia. The lady is surprised when he does noes not show up on the next date. Guest stars: Arthur Franz, Judith Braun, Madge Blake, Jess Kirkpatrick, Frank Scannell, Will J. White, Edna Holland, Russell Thorson, Jacqueline Holt, and James Knight
111	7	"Innocent Bystander"	László Benedek	Story by : László Görög, William Koenig, & Richard Bluel; Teleplay by : László Görög & Jack Laird	November 13, 1956
A journalist wonders why he was hit in the head with a rock. Guest stars: Don Taylor, Reba Tassell, Herb Vigran, Robert Foulk, Virginia Christine, Fred Sherman, Robert Nichols, Nesdon Booth, Raymond Bailey, Larry J. Blake, Johnny Crawford, Lee Erickson, Patricia Hardy, Dennis Moore, and Skip Torgerson
112	8	"Woman's Work"	William A. Seiter	John D. Weaver	November 20, 1956
An old man believes that women should cater to men. Guest stars: Walter Brennan, Mary Murphy, James Best, Jane Darwell, Tom Fadden, Clem Bevans, and Irving Bacon
113	9	"Return of a Bombardier"	Alvin Ganzer	Story by : Jacob DeShazer (book); Teleplay by : Jo Pagano	November 27, 1956
An American U.S. Army Air Force pilot vows to return to Japan if and when he leaves a Japanese POW camp as a missionary. Guest stars: Clifford Arashi, Sue Carlton, Dominique De Leon, James Dobson, Herb Ellis, Chick Furuye, Skip Homeier, Clifford Kawada, Don Kennedy, Bob Kino, Bob Okazaki, Joseph V. Perry, Wally Richards, and John Sheppod
114	10	"Pursuit of a Princess"	William A. Seiter	Story by : George Loveridge, William Koenig, & Richard Bluel; Teleplay by : László Görög	December 4, 1956
An older lady does not realize the valuable wood carvings she has in her possession. Guest stars: Brian Aherne, Fred Clark, Ida Moore, Mary Lawrence, Dick Elliott, Paul Burns, Florenz Ames, Oliver Blake, and Edward Schryver
115	11	"Once a Hero"	Lee Sholem	Story by : Jack Schaefer; Teleplay by : John Dunkel	December 11, 1956
A former rodeo star yearns to be one again. Guest stars: Ward Bond, Richard Eyer, Ben Johnson, Sarah Selby, Chris Olsen, Mike Winkelman, Robert Eyer, David McMahon, Ralph Peters, Dan White, Bob Burrows, Frank Ellis, Bob Folkerson, Herman Hack, and Pamela Jayson
116	12	"The Blessed Midnight"	László Benedek	William Jerome Fay	December 18, 1956
Two boys on Christmas Eve, one steals for his aunt, the other tries to make things right. Guest stars: Maureen O'Sullivan, Danny Richards Jr., David Saber, Virginia Gregg, Frances Bavier, Ray Teal, Victor Sutherland, Stephen Wootton, Carole Wells, Joseph Mell, Harry Arnie, Steve Stevens, David Leonard, Clark Howat, James Bates, Ronnie Paul, and St. Paul's Little Singers
117	13	"Three Young Kings"	Richard Kinon	Story by : George Sumner Albee; Teleplay by : László Görög	December 25, 1956
Three young boys dressed as the Three Wise Men on their way to the mission church give the gifts to the poor children instead. Guest stars: Thomas Mitchell, Frank Puglia, Robert Hernandes, Tony Terry, Carlos Vera, Nestor Paiva, Alma Beltram, Edward Colmans, Joe Dominguez, Michelle Ducasse, Nacho Galindo, Michael Lewis, Tina Menard, Joseph Sanchez, and Felipe Turich
118	14	"The Two Worlds of Nicolo"	Alvin Ganzer	Story by : Anne Howard Bailey, William Koenig, & Richard Bluel; Teleplay by : Jo Pagano	January 1, 1957
A teenager comes to America as a foreign exchange student and is happy until he finds out there are problems at home. Guest stars: Peter Raynolds, James Seay, Sheila Bromley, Susan Odin, Joseph V. Perry, Gary Gray, Michael Winkelman, Tom Brandt, Lorey Allen, and Melody O'Connell
119	15	"The House of Empty Rooms"	Anton Leader	Story by : Doris Hume, William Koenig, & Richard Bluel; Teleplay by : Gabrielle Upton	January 8, 1957
The son and daughter-in-law of an aging lady moves out of the house. Guest stars: Ann Harding, Helen Westcott, Ross Ford, Carol Veazie, Judith Ames, Robert Crosson, Beverly Long, Ray Walker, Sydney Mason, Mack Williams, Sven-Hugo Borg, and Jimmy Carter
120	16	"Leap to Heaven"	Alvin Ganzer	Story by : William Koenig & Richard Bluel; Teleplay by : Frederic Brady	January 15, 1957
Bob Richards's life is explored from athlete to minister to politician. Guest stars: Bob Richards, James McCallion, Hal Stalmaster, Richard Tyler, Louise Arthur, Gloria Castillo, Marjorie Owens, Donna Corcoran, Alan Dinehart III, and Alan Reynolds
121	17	"Dowry for Ilona"	László Benedek	Story by : Al Martin & László Görög; Teleplay by : Al Martin	January 22, 1957
A family argues over the dowry to give the groom. Guest stars: Oscar Homolka, Steven Geray, Dan Barton, Carolyn Craig, Lisa Golm, Everett Glass, Oliver McGowan, and Amalia Liggett
122	18	"The Man from St. Paul"	Wilhelm Thiele	Story by : John Driscoll; Teleplay by : Merwin Gerard	January 27, 1957
A school principal (Picerni) goes out of his way for a student accused of robbery even when the school's lunch line register has money come up missing. Guest stars: Bud Alberts, Claire Carleton, Bonnie Franklin, James Goodwin, Raymond Greenleaf, Mary Jackson, Stacy Keach, Michael Landon, Norman Ollestad, Paul Picerni, Aline Towne, and Harry Townes
123	19	"Are Trees People?"	William A. Seiter	Story by : Paul Hackett, William Koenig, & Richard Bluel; Teleplay by : Paul Hackett	February 5, 1957
A widow living with her daughter yearns to live where she once did. Guest stars: Ruth Donnelly, Ricky Vera, Clancy Cooper, Jean Howell, Ed Brophy, Marjorie Bennett, Percy Helton, Thomas Bonilla, and Marty Carrizosa
124	20	"Decision for a Hero"	László Benedek	Story by : William E. Barrett, William Koenig, & Richard Bluel; Teleplay by : Gabrielle Upton	February 12, 1957
When a bony college student forces himself too much and ends up dead, his mother tells the star athlete they were friends when in reality they were not. Guest stars: John Ericson, Joan Evans, Lurene Tuttle, William Swan, Donald Freed, Wade Cagle, Patrick Clement, Hooper Dunbar, Guy Williams, Larry Bracken, and Ron Foster
125	21	"The Frightened Witness"	Anton Leader	Story by : Mildred Cram; Teleplay by : Malvin Wald & Jack Jacobs	February 19, 1957
When a butcher witnesses a hit, The butcher and his family are threatened by the mob. Guest stars: Dan Duryea, Harold Stone, Barbara Billingsley, Herbert Rudley, Christian Pasques, Wendy Winkelman, Eleanor Audley, Lewis Charles, Edward Jerome, Jim Nolan, Philip Van Zandt, and Dan Riss
126	22	"The Man Who Asked No Favors"	László Benedek	Jo Pagano & Rosalie Bodrero	March 5, 1957
When a preacher decides not to pray for rain, the town rejects him. Guest stars: Lew Ayres, Sandy Descher, Whitney Blake, Rhodes Reason, Morris Ankrum, Malcolm Atterbury, Howard Wright, and Kathleen Mulqueen
127	23	"Don Marshall's Brat"	Reginald LeBorg	Michael Fessier	March 19, 1957
When a young girl (McCormack) saves an elderly Mexican (McDonald), he tries to help her end a feud between her paternal grandfather and her parents. Guest stars: Patty McCormack, Paul Fix, Francis J. McDonald, Barbara Eiler, Russell Johnson, Charles Smith, Kenneth MacDonald, Betty Farrington, William Challee, and Tex Palmer
128	24	"The Widow Is Willing"	Harry Horner	Story by : Merle Constiner, William Koenig, & Richard Bluel; Teleplay by : Dane Lussier	March 26, 1957
Having made a firm decision, a widow decides to remarry. Guest stars: Anne Jeffreys, Robert Sterling, Jean Inness, Paul Keast, Claire Carleton, Pat O'Hara, Anthony Jochim, Emmett Vogan, and Dee Carroll
129	25	"The Last Signer"	George Archainbaud	Frederic Brady	April 2, 1957
Someone writes on the Declaration of Independence. Guest stars: Kevin McCarthy, Vladimir Sokoloff, Lisa Montell, Otto Waldis, Howard McNear, Brad Morrow, Barbara Wooddell, Lewis Martin, Robert Osterloh, Edit Angold, Joe Quinn, and Dick Rich
130	26	"The Shark on the Mountain"	Louis King	Bob Mitchell	April 23, 1957
A young man (Eyer) has been telling lies until he witnesses a murder, and he is not believed. Guest stars: Ross Elliott, Richard Eyer, James Gleason, Jean Howell, Henry Kulky, William F. Leicester, and Ted Stanhope
131	27	"Chicago 2–1–2"	Norman Foster	Story by : Jo B. Regan & Phil Regan; Teleplay by : William P. Rousseau	March 30, 1957
Before an arsonist can murder someone in abandoned buildings, a fire investigator (Lovejoy) looks to stop it. Guest stars: Frank Lovejoy, Roy Thinnes, Curley Bradley, Tomi Thurston, Franklyn MacCormack, Clifford Soubier, and Fern Persons

== Books ==
Martin Grams, Jr.'s history of Cavalcade of America was published in 1998.

During the late 1930s, Dixon Ryan Fox, Arthur Meier Schlesinger, and William Sanderson edited a series of books based on the series published by Milton Bradley Company. In 1956, the series was adapted into a book, Cavalcade of America: The Deeds and Achievements of the Men and Women Who Made Our Country Great. Chapters covered such historical figures as Abraham Lincoln, telegraph organizer Hiram Sibley, engineer James Eads, John Quincy Adams fighting the gag rule and Clara Barton's career that led her to head the American Red Cross. Martin Grams, Jr.'s The History of the Cavalcade of America features episode guides for both the radio and TV series.

== See also ==
- Academy Award
- Author's Playhouse
- The Campbell Playhouse
- The CBS Radio Workshop
- Curtain Time
- Ford Theatre
- General Electric Theater
- Lux Radio Theater
- The Mercury Theatre on the Air
- The MGM Theater of the Air
- Screen Director's Playhouse
- The Screen Guild Theater
- Suspense
- The United States Steel Hour
