= List of The Lone Ranger guest stars =

The Lone Ranger is an American Western television series that aired on the ABC Television network from 1949 to 1957, with Clayton Moore in the starring role. Jay Silverheels, a member of the Mohawk Aboriginal people in Canada, played The Lone Ranger's Indian companion Tonto.

Guest star	Role(s)	Episode(s)	Year
Michael Ansara	Angry Horse	"Trouble at Black Rock"	1951
James Arness	Deputy Bud Titus	"Matter of Courage"	1950
John Banner	Von Baden	"Damsels in Distress"	1950
Frances Bavier	Aunt Maggie Sawtelle	"Sawtelle Saga's End"	1955
Hugh Beaumont	Reverend Randy Roberts	"The Godless Men"	1953
Lane Bradford	Jake	"The Legion of Old Timers"	1949
Lane Bradford	Slick	"Greed for Gold"	1950
Lane Bradford	Sergeant Pala	"White Man's Magic"	1950
Lane Bradford	Lige Watkin	"Crime in Time"	1950
Lane Bradford	Joe	"Desert Adventure"	1950
Lane Bradford	Gat Towson	"The Outcast"	1951
Lane Bradford	Dusty	"The Hooded Men"	1951
Lane Bradford	Rufe	"Jeb's Gold Mine"	1952
Lane Bradford	Zeke	"A Stage for Mademoiselle"	1953
Lane Bradford	Smiley Hawks	"The Deserter"	1953
Lane Bradford	Gus	"Message to Fort Apache"	1954
Lane Bradford	Matt Rusk	"Stage to Teshimingo"	1954
Lane Bradford	Jed	"The Cross of Santo Domingo"	1956
Lane Bradford	George Stark	"Christmas Story"	1956
Lane Bradford	Duke Wade	"Mission for Tonto"	1957
Robert Bray	Al Davis	"Jeb's Gold Mine"	1952
Robert Bray	Ben	"Bandits in Uniform"	1953
Robert Bray	Dan Glick	"The Perfect Crime"	1953
Robert Bray	Joe Tarbuck	"Outlaw's Trail"	1954
Robert Bray	Mace	"Two for Juan Ringo"	1954
Robert Bray	Mike Barty	"False Accusation"	1955
Harry Carey Jr.	Jay Thomasson	"The Return of Dice Dawson"	1955
Harry Cheshire	Judge Wells	"Word of Honor"	1952
Harry Cheshire	Doc Wilson	"The Midnight Rider"	1953
Phyllis Coates	Ann Wyman	"Stage to Estacado"	1953
Phyllis Coates	Naomi Courtwright	"The Perfect Crime"	1953
Phyllis Coates	Jane Johnson	"Woman in the White Mask"	1955
Christopher Dark	Kat-Kem	"The Return"	1955
Gail Davis		"Buried Treasure"	1950
Gail Davis		"Spanish Gold"	1950
Gail Davis		"Friend In Need"	1951
John Doucette	Dirk	"The Masked Rider"	1949
John Doucette	Ox Martin	"Gold Fever"	1950
John Doucette	Rocky Hanford	"Sheriff of Gunstock"	1950
John Doucette	Pierre Dumont	"Thieves' Money"	1950
John Doucette	Flack	"The Hooded Men"	1951
John Doucette	Andrew Gage	"Bandits in Uniform"	1953
John Doucette	Blaze	"The Fugitive"	1954
John Doucette	Kelso	"Rendezvous at Whipsaw"	1954
John Doucette	Lew Cates	"The School Story"	1955
John Doucette	Deputy Sawyer	"Trapped"	1955
John Doucette	Beau Slate	"Counterfeit Redskins"	1955
Frank Ferguson	Lester Grey	"The Globe"	1954
Frank Ferguson	Oscar Vale	"Enfield Rifle"	1955
Frank Ferguson	Cassius Holt	"Death Goes to Press"	1955
Frank Ferguson	Bennett	"Trapped"	1955
Margaret Field		"Greed for Gold"	1950
John Hart		"Rifles and Renegades"	1950
John Hart		"Sheriff at Gunstock"	1950
Percy Helton		"Dan Reid's Sacrifice"	1955
Dwayne Hickman		"Two Gold Lockets"	1951
Darryl Hickman		"Two Gold Lockets"	1951
David Holt	prison warden's kidnapped son	"Never Say Die"	1950
I. Stanford Jolley	Asa Jones	"Rifles and Renegades"	1950
I. Stanford Jolley	Stark Durfee	"Eye for an Eye"	1950
I. Stanford Jolley	Seth	"Lady Killer"	1950
I. Stanford Jolley	Will Motter	"Trader Boggs"	1953
I. Stanford Jolley	Don Esteban	"Bandits in Uniform"	1953
I. Stanford Jolley	Dave	"Hidden Fortune"	1953
Dick Jones		"Man Without a Gun"	1950
Stacy Keach Sr.		"Showdown at Sand Creek"	1955
DeForest Kelley	Bob Kittridge	"The Legion of Old Timers"	1949
DeForest Kelley		"Gold Trains"	1950
DeForest Kelley		"Death in the Forest"	1953
Douglas Kennedy	Curley Bates	"A Pardon for Curley"	1950
Douglas Kennedy	Slim Roberts	"Desperado at Large"	1952
Douglas Kennedy	Bull Gunderson	"Ranger in Danger"	1952
Douglas Kennedy	George Milliner	"Right to Vote"	1953
Douglas Kennedy	Sheriff Tom Lowell	"Six Gun Sanctuary"	1954
Douglas Kennedy	John Trent	"Trigger Finger"	1955
Nan Leslie	Nancy Barton	"The Masked Rider"	1949
Nan Leslie	Alicia Scoville	"The Wrong Man"	1950
Nan Leslie	Leia Anson	"Lady Killer"	1950
Nan Leslie	Martha Neal	"Special Edition"	1952
Nan Leslie	Molly O'Connel	"The Durango Kid"	1953
Nan Leslie	Kitty Martin	"Gentleman from Julesburg"	1953
Nan Leslie	Jean Scott	"A Broken Match"	1954
Nan Leslie	Susan Starr	"Adventure at Arbuckle"	1956
Marjorie Lord		"The Law Lady"	1955
Tyler MacDuff	Brad Stanton	"One Nation, Indivisible"	1955
Tyler MacDuff	Clint Harkey	"The Twisted Track"	1956
Tyler MacDuff	Kip Holloway	"Mission for Tonto"	1957
David McMahon	Clay Durfee	"Eye for an Eye"	1950
David McMahon	Jim Collins	"Thieves' Money"	1950
David McMahon	Mr. Herbert	"Mr. Trouble"	1951
David McMahon	Bert	"Word of Honor"	1952
Martin Milner		"Pay Dirt"	1950
Ewing Mitchell	Major	"The Courage of Tonto"	1957
Ewing Mitchell	Tom Bryan	"The Banker's Son"	1957
Ewing Mitchell	Noel Neill	"Letter of the Law"	1951
John M Pickard	Smokey Baines	"Outlaw's Son"	1952
John M Pickard	Jeff Seaton	"Best Laid Plans"	1952
John M Pickard	Henry Flack	"The Ghost of Coyote Canyon"	1953
John M Pickard	Matt Coleman	"Sunstroke Mesa"	1955
John M Pickard	Moose Miller	"Heart of a Cheater"	1955
John M Pickard	Jess Tyler	"Trouble at Tylerville"	1956
John M Pickard	Lem Hollister	"Outlaws in Grease Paint"	1957
Slim Pickens		"The Sheriff of Smoke Tree"	1956
Slim Pickens		"The Letter Bride"	1956
Denver Pyle		"The Outcast"	1951
Denver Pyle		"Backtrail"	1951
Denver Pyle		"The Hooded Men"	1951
Denver Pyle		"The Woman in the White Mask"	1955
Denver Pyle		"The Cross of Santo Domingo"	1956
Denver Pyle		"Quicksand"	1956
Mike Ragan	Curly	"Barnaby Boggs, Esquire"	1950
Mike Ragan	Pike Lane	"Bullets for Ballots"	1950
Mike Ragan	Crane	"The Black Widow"	1950
Mike Ragan	Al	"Danger Ahead"	1950
Mike Ragan	Chad Hackett	"Silent Voice"	1951
Mike Ragan	Jeff Durbin	"Through the Wall"	1952
Mike Ragan	Dave	"White Hawk's Decision"	1956
Mike Ragan	Slim Wiley	"Quarter Horse War"	1956
Mike Ragan	Sloat	"Ghost Canyon"	1956
Marion Ross		"Texas Draw"	1954
Victor Sen Yung		"The Letter Bride"	1956
Kim Spalding	Moose	"Million Dollar Wallpaper"	1950
Kim Spalding	Ed	"Backtrail"	1951
Kim Spalding	Joe	"Tumblerock Law"	1953
Glenn Strange	Butch Cavendish	"Enter the Lone Ranger"	1949
Glenn Strange	Butch Cavendish	"The Lone Ranger Fights On"	1949
Glenn Strange	Butch Cavendish	"The Lone Ranger's Triumph"	1949
Glenn Strange	Butch Cavendish	"Never Say Die"	1950
Glenn Strange	Bart Walton	"Indian Charlie"	1953
Glenn Strange	Tom Casley	"Gunpowder Joe"	1953
Glenn Strange	stagecoach driver	"Ex-Marshal"	1954
Glenn Strange	stagecoach driver	"The Too-Perfect Signature"	1955
William Tannen	Curly	"Man of the House"	1950
William Tannen	Major Halliday	"Quarter Horse War"	1956
William Tannen	Seth McKeever	"Decision for Chris McKeever"	1956
Carol Thurston	Beata	"Finders Keepers"	1949
Carol Thurston	Mary Turner	"Masked Deputy"	1950
Minerva Urecal		"Ghost Town Fury"	1950
Minerva Urecal		"Homer With a High Hat"	1954
Lee Van Cleef		"Desperado at Large"	1952
Lee Van Cleef		"The Brown Pony"	1953
Lee Van Cleef		"Stage to Estacado"	1953
Eddy Waller	Jules	"The Gentleman from Julesburg"	1953
Eddy Waller	Jim Haskell	"Heart of a Cheater"	1955
Eddy Waller	Hardrock Hazen	"The Swami"	1955
Frank Wilcox	Ross Colby	"The Map"	1952
Frank Wilcox	Samuel DeWitt	"A Stage for Mademoiselle"	1953
Frank Wilcox	Slate Corbaley	"Prisoner in Jeopardy"	1953
Frank Wilcox	Bradford	"The Return"	1955
Guy Williams	love-struck sheriff	"Six-Gun Artist"	1955
Michael Winkelman	Chip Truett	"The Prince of Buffalo Gap"	1957
Sheb Wooley		"The Wake of War"	1953
Sheb Wooley		"Stage to Estacado"	1953
Sheb Wooley		"Message to Fort Apache"	1954
Sheb Wooley		"Wanted: The Lone Ranger"	1955
Hank Worden	Rusty Bates	"The Tenderfeet"	1949
Hank Worden	Stage Driver Whip	"Woman from Omaha"	1953
Hank Worden	Ed	"The Ghost of Coyote Canyon"	1953
Hank Worden	Ike Beatty	"Stage to Teshimingo"	1954
Hank Worden	Jud	"The Bait: Gold"	1955
Hank Worden	Bruckner	"The Banker's Son"	1957
