= Don Kennedy (actor) =

American film and television actor (1921–2013

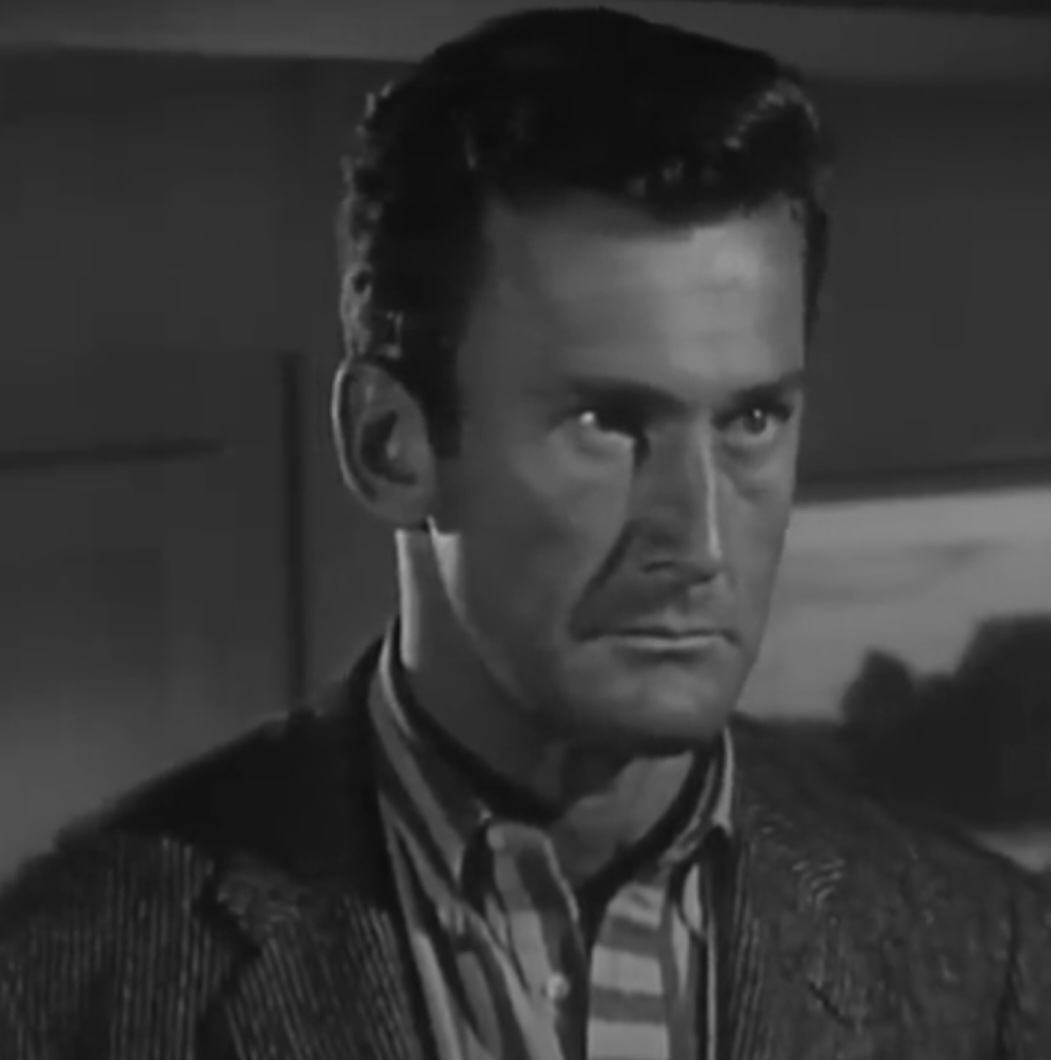
- Kennedy in Man with a Camera, 1958
- Born: Donald Frederick Kennedy; September 2, 1921; Los Angeles, California, U.S.
- Died: April 3, 2013 (aged 91); Del Mar, California, U.S.
- Years active: 1950–1988
- Father: Tom Kennedy

Donald Frederick Kennedy (September 3, 1921 – April 3, 2013), better known as Don Kennedy or Bud Kennedy, was an American film and television actor. He was known for playing Charlie Tucker in the 1963 film Hud.

Kennedy was born in Los Angeles, California on September 3, 1921, the son of actor Tom Kennedy and Frances Marshall. He died in Del Mar, California on April 3, 2013, at the age of 91.

== Selected filmography ==
Year	Title	Role	Notes
1954	Return from the Sea	Joe	
1955	An Annapolis Story	McClaren	
1956	Friendly Persuasion	Buster - Whacked by Eliza (uncredited)	
1960	Spring Affair	Dan	
1980	The Stunt Man	Lineman	Season 1, Episode 14
1963	Hud	Charlie Tucker	

== Selected television ==
Year	Title	Role	Notes
1953	You Are There	Lt. Edward Doherty	Episode "The Capture of John Wilkes Booth" (April 26, 1865)
1954	Hopalong Cassidy	Bob Murdock (as Donald Kennedy)	Episode "Steel Trails West"
1954	Annie Oakley	Bart Thompson	Episode "Annie Makes a Marriage"
1956	You Are There (TV Series)		Episode - Decatur's Raid at Tripoli (February 16, 1804)
1956	Highway Patrol	Highway Patrolman	Episode "Girl Bandit" (1956)
1957	Zane Grey Theatre	Stony Fields	Episode "Three Graves"
1957	Tales of the Texas Rangers	Dirk	Episode "The Kid from Amarillo"
1959	Bat Masterson	Sheriff Tim Lockhart	Season, Episode "Death and Taxes"
1959	Bat Masterson	Fred Sanders	Episode "Wanted: Dead"
1956	The Life and Legend of Wyatt Earp	Chief Sheriff's Deputy Bill Tilghman	Episode: Dodge City Gets a New Marshal
1958	The Life and Legend of Wyatt Earp	Sam Price (uncredited)	Episode "Wyatt Earp Rides Shotgun"
1959	The Life and Legend of Wyatt Earp	Todd	Episode "Wells Fargo Calling Marshal Earp"
1960	Wanted Dead or Alive	Marc	Season 2, Episode 30 "The Inheritance"
1966	The Monkees	Policeman	S1:E11, "Monkees à la Carte"
