= John Dodsworth (actor) =

English actor (1910–1964)

- Born: John Cecil Dodsworth; 17 September 1910; London, England
- Died: 11 September 1964 (aged 53); Los Angeles, California, USA
- Occupation: Actor
- Years active: 1934–1958
- Spouse: Donna Heydt (1961-1964) (his death)

John Cecil Dodsworth (17 September 1910 – 11 September 1964) was an English actor.

== Biography and career ==
Born John Cecil Dodsworth in London, England. Dodsworth started his film career as an extra in British films of the 1930s before taking on small parts in The Next of Kin (1942), They Were Sisters and The Rake's Progress (both 1945). He had much larger roles in his next two films, as the romantic lead in the Bud Flanagan and Chesney Allen comedy Here Comes the Sun (1946), and Who Killed Van Loon? (1948), an early film from Hammer Film Productions.

Like a lot of British actors of the period he moved to America in the 1950s, where he was usually cast as the archetypal English officer or aristocrat. He made his Hollywood film debut in Up Front (1951), followed by supporting roles in prestige films including Singin' in the Rain (1952), The Snows of Kilimanjaro (1952) and Lust for Life (1956). Interspersed with these small parts were more substantial roles in modest scale productions, such as William Cameron Menzies' cult classic The Maze (1953) and the Bowery Boys comedies Loose in London (1953) and In the Money (1958). He also appeared in TV shows such as Jungle Jim, Alfred Hitchcock Presents, Maverick and 77 Sunset Strip.

He married film production secretary Donna Hedyt in 1961. Dodsworth committed suicide in 1964 at the age of 53.

== Filmography ==
Year	Title	Role	Notes
1934	The Return of Bulldog Drummond	Extra - Audience Member Leaving Auditorium	Uncredited
1942	The Next of Kin	Officer Giving Davis a Lift	Uncredited
1945	They Were Sisters	Cyril	Uncredited
1945	The Rake's Progress	Team Manager	Uncredited
1946	Here Comes the Sun	Roy Lucas	
1948	Who Killed Van Loon	Ian Ferguson	
1951	Up Front	British Officer	Uncredited
1951	David and Bathsheba	Ahithophel	Uncredited
1952	Singin' in the Rain	Baron de la Ma de la Toulon	Uncredited
1952	Storm Over Tibet	Malloy	
1952	Les Misérables	Sergeant	Uncredited
1952	The Snows of Kilimanjaro	Compton	Uncredited
1952	Bwana Devil	Sir William Drayton	
1953	Rogue's March	Major MacStreet	
1953	The Magnetic Monster	Dr. Carthwright	
1953	Titanic	Stoker Exclaiming 'For God's Sake!'	Uncredited
1953	Loose in London	Sir Edgar Whipsnade	
1953	The Maze	Dr. Bert Dilling	
1954	Her Twelve Men	Mr. Curtis	Uncredited
1954	Charade	Lieutenant Meyerdorf	
1954	Bengal Brigade	Captain Guy Fitz-Morell	Uncredited
1955	Untamed	Captain Richard Eaton	Uncredited
1955	Escape to Burma	Undetermined Role	Uncredited
1955	The Sea Chase	British Officer of the Watch	Uncredited
1956	Gaby	Broadcaster	Uncredited
1956	Lust for Life	Handsome Man	Uncredited
1956	The Mole People	Priest	Uncredited
1957	Something of Value	Doctor	Uncredited
1957	The 27th Day	BBC Newscaster	Uncredited
1958	In the Money	Blake Cummings	
1958	Merry Andrew	Lord Elmwood	Uncredited

== Television ==
Year	Title	Role	Episode
1952	Fireside Theater	Undetermined Role	Season 4 Episode 36: 'The Last Stop'
1952	Schlitz Playhouse of Stars	Undetermined Role	Season 1 Episode 40: 'The House of Death'
1952	Cavalcade of America	Lt. Allen	Season 1 Episode 2: 'All's Well With Lydia'
1953	Cavalcade of America	Undetermined Role	Season 2 Episode 1: 'Sam and the Whale'
1953	Cavalcade of America	Undetermined Role	Season 2 Episode 2: 'The Stolen General'
1953	Chevron Theatre	Undetermined Role	Season 2 Episode 6: 'Adventure in Java'
1953	General Electric Theater	Undetermined Role	Season 1 Episode 4: 'Best Seller'
1954	Cavalcade of America	John Morley	Season 2 Episode 21: 'The Splendid Dream'
1955	TV Reader's Digest	Undetermined Role	Season 1 Episode 12: 'Incident on the China Coast'
1955	Climax!	Major Adams	Season 1 Episode 29: 'To Wake at Midnight'
1955	NBC Matinee Theater	Undetermined Role	Season 1 Episode 14: 'The Aspern Papers'
1955	Jungle Jim	Neil Croft	Season 1 Episode 10: 'The Deadly Idol'
1956	Alfred Hitchcock Presents	Calender	Season 1 Episode 31: 'The Gentleman From America'
1956	Telephone Time	Undetermined Role	Season 1 Episode 7: 'Time Bomb'
1956	General Electric Summer Originals	Undetermined Role	Season 1 Episode 2: 'Duel at Dawn'
1958	Maverick	Clayton Palmer	Season 1 Episode 20: 'The Savage Hills'
1958	77 Sunset Strip	Martin Melville	Season 1 Episode 2: 'Lovely Lady, Pity Me'
