= Jalopy (film) =

1953 film by William Beaudine

- Directed by: William Beaudine
- Written by: Tim Ryan; Edmond Seward; Jack Crutcher
- Produced by: Ben Schwalb
- Starring: Leo Gorcey; Huntz Hall; David Gorcey; Bernard Gorcey
- Cinematography: Harry Neumann
- Edited by: William Austin
- Music by: Marlin Skiles
- Production company: Allied Artists Pictures
- Distributed by: Allied Artists Pictures
- Release date: February 15, 1953
- Running time: 62 minutes
- Country: United States
- Language: English

Jalopy is a 1953 comedy film starring The Bowery Boys. The film was released on February 15, 1953 by Allied Artists and is the twenty-ninth film in the series. Jalopy represents the first Bowery Boys film to be released by Allied Artists, previous were by Monogram Pictures.

== Plot ==
Sach convinces Louie to rent the back room of the sweet shop to a professor. Meanwhile, Slip is preoccupied with entering their car in an auto race to raise enough money to help Louie pay his bills. They don't have any luck with the car until Sach invents a formula that makes the car go faster. A crooked gambler tries to steal the formula from them, with no luck. Slip enters into another race, but has to start the race without the formula in the car as Sach was making another batch. When Sach reaches him in the middle of the race and puts the formula in the gas tank the cars begins to accelerate...only in reverse! Sach and Slip then continue the race in reverse and wind up winning. Sach then realizes why the formula didn't work as it did before...the seltzer that he added to the formula was flat!

== Cast ==
=== The Bowery Boys ===
- Leo Gorcey as Terrance Aloysius "Slip" Mahoney
- Huntz Hall as Horace Debussy "Sach" Jones
- David Gorcey as Chuck (Credited as David Condon)
- Bennie Bartlett as Butch

=== Remaining cast ===
- Bernard Gorcey as Louie Dumbrowski
- Robert Lowery as "Skid" Wilson
- Jane Easton as Bobbie Lane
- Leon Belasco as Professor Bosgood Elrod

== Production ==
The race scenes were filmed at the Culver City Stadium in Culver City, California and were mainly unused scenes from The Roar of the Crowd, which was released by Allied Artists in the same year. It was also the first Bowery Boys' film released by Allied Artists, which was the new name of Monogram Pictures, the same company that all their previous films were released under.

== Home media ==
Warner Archives released the film on made-to-order DVD in the United States as part of "The Bowery Boys, Volume Three" on October 1, 2013.

| Preceded by No Holds Barred; 1952 | 'The Bowery Boys' movies 1946-1958 | Succeeded by Loose in London; 1953 |
