= Loose in London =

1953 film by Edward Bernds

- Directed by: Edward Bernds
- Written by: Elwood Ullman; Edward Bernds
- Produced by: Ben Schwalb
- Starring: Leo Gorcey; Huntz Hall; David Gorcey; Bernard Gorcey
- Cinematography: Harry Neumann
- Edited by: Allan K. Wood
- Music by: Marlin Skiles
- Production company: Allied Artists Pictures
- Distributed by: Allied Artists Pictures
- Release date: May 24, 1953
- Running time: 62 minutes
- Country: United States
- Language: English

Loose in London is a 1953 American comedy film directed by Edward Bernds and starring The Bowery Boys. The film was released on May 24, 1953, by Allied Artists and is the thirtieth film in the series.

== Plot ==
Sach receives notice that a dying British earl is his long-lost relative. He travels there with the rest of the gang after exchanging his free first-class ticket for four economy class tickets. Meanwhile, Louie, who is on board to say goodbye, gets locked in a closet and becomes a stowaway. When the boys arrive in London they are treated with disdain from the earl's other relatives, who are secretly plotting to kill the earl. Sach livens up the earl by telling him to eat ice cream instead of his medicine, and generally making him laugh. The earl's health begins to improve and he decides to make Sach his sole heir. The other relatives decide they need to kill off the earl immediately, but are foiled by the boys. Unfortunately just before the earl is to sign the paperwork making Sach the heir, his lawyer arrives and informs them that he made an error and Sach isn't really his relative.

== Cast ==
=== The Bowery Boys ===
- Leo Gorcey as Terence Aloysius 'Slip' Mahoney
- Huntz Hall as Horace Debussy 'Sach' Jones
- David Condon as Chuck Anderson
- Bennie Bartlett as Butch Williams

=== Remaining cast ===
- Bernard Gorcey as Louie Dumbrowski
- Angela Greene as Lady Marcia
- Walter Kingsford as Sir Percy, Earl of Walsingham
- Norma Varden as Aunt Agatha
- John Dodsworth as Sir Edgar Whipsnade
- William Cottrell as Reggie
- Rex Evans as Herbert
- James Logan as Hoskins
- Alex Frazer as J. Allison Higby
- Charles Keane as Bly
- Clyde Cook as Taxi driver
- Matthew Boulton as Ames
- John Rogers as Ship Steward

== Production ==
The film was originally planned to be produced in 1950, under then title Knights of the Square Table. This is the first film in the series where Chuck and Butch are given last names, 'Anderson' and 'Williams', respectively.

== Home media ==
Warner Archives released the film on made-to-order DVD in the United States as part of "The Bowery Boys, Volume Two" on April 9, 2013.

Preceded by Jalopy; 1953	'The Bowery Boys' movies 1946-1958	Succeeded by Clipped Wings; 1953
