= Thomas D. Howie =

United States Army officer killed in WWII (1908–1944)

Thomas Dry Howie
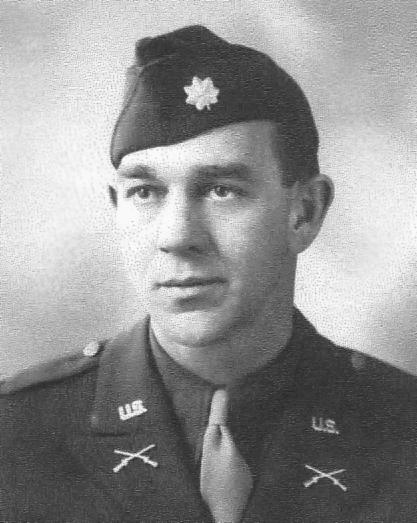
- Born: April 12, 1908; Abbeville, South Carolina, US
- Died: July 17, 1944 (aged 36) Saint-Lô, France
- Buried: Normandy American Cemetery
- Allegiance: United States of America
- Branch: Virginia National Guard; United States Army
- Service years: 1929–1944
- Rank: Major
- Commands: 2d and 3rd Battalions, 116th Infantry Regiment, 29th Infantry Division
- Conflicts: World War II: Invasion of Normandy
- Awards: Silver Star; Bronze Star; Purple Heart; Croix de Guerre

Major Thomas Dry Howie (April 12, 1908 – July 17, 1944) was a United States Army infantry officer and battalion commander in the 29th Infantry Division who was killed in action during the Battle of Normandy in World War II while leading his unit in an effort to capture the strategic French town of Saint-Lô. He became immortalized as "The Major of St. Lo".

== Early life ==
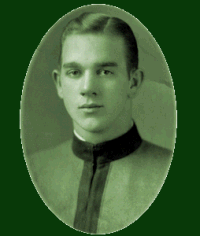
Howie as a cadet at The Citadel

Howie was a native of Abbeville, South Carolina and the fifth of seven children born to Torrance and Cora Dry Howie. He attended Abbeville High School where he was a star athlete and also worked part-time jobs at a print shop and local mill. At The Citadel in Charleston, South Carolina he was a Dean's List English major, president of his class, All-State halfback on the football team and captain of the baseball team; he was also voted “Most Versatile, Popular and Best All Around” by his classmates. His principles and leadership abilities became evident in his junior year when he led a hunger strike by the Corps of Cadets to protest the poor quality of food in the mess hall. In the fall of 1928 Howie travelled to Columbia, South Carolina to take the qualifying test for the Rhodes Scholarship then was hurriedly driven back to Charleston by an assistant coach to play in the homecoming football game; he arrived just in time for the opening kickoff, and later scored the winning touchdown as The Citadel beat Clemson 12-7.

After graduating in 1929, he taught English, served as athletic director and coached sports at Staunton Military Academy in Virginia where his football teams won four Military School State Championships. During his time in Staunton he would meet and marry Elizabeth Payne (1905-1989). A daughter, Sally, was born in 1938.

== Military service ==
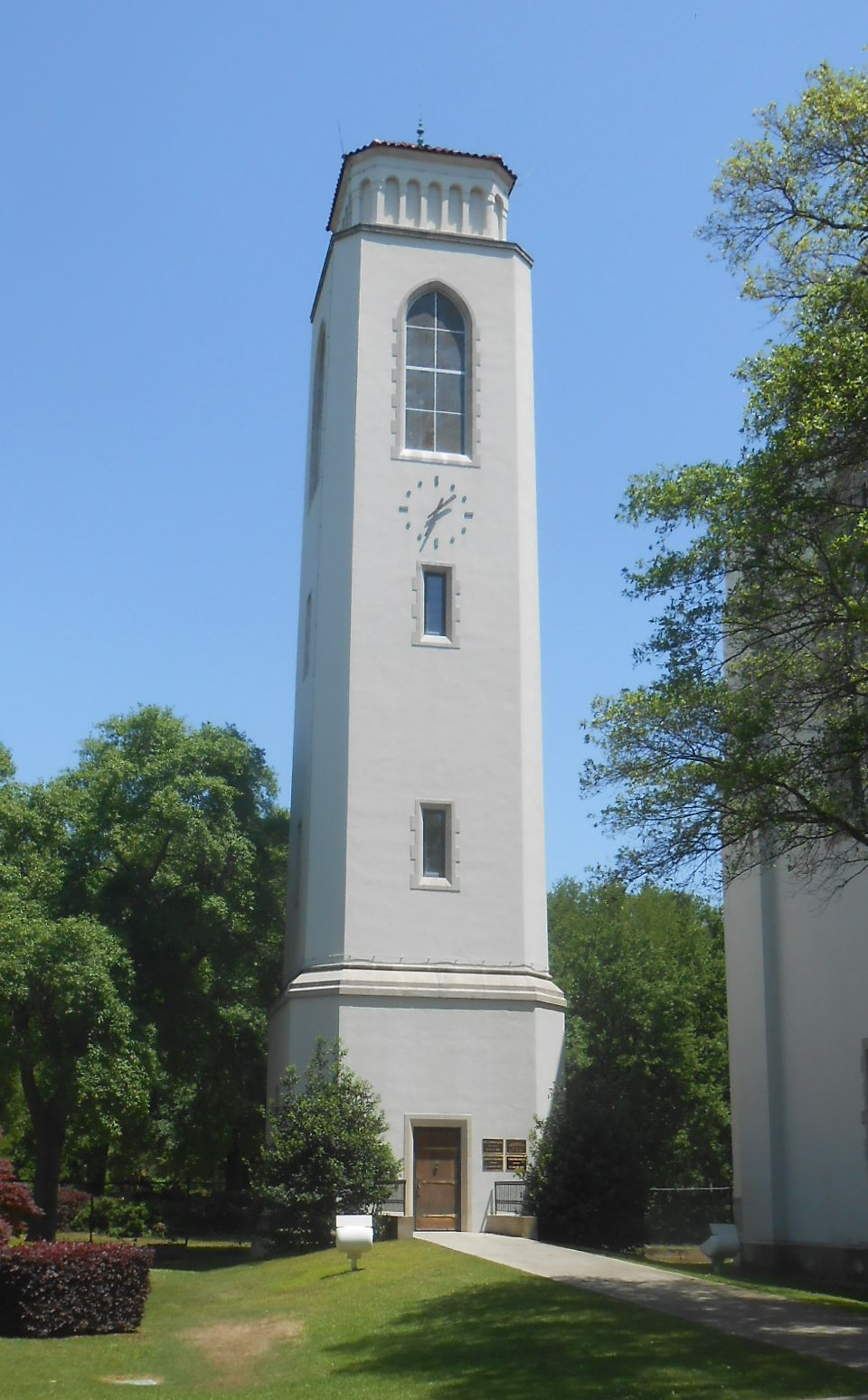
Howie Belltower on the campus of The Citadel

After graduation, Howie accepted a commission as a second lieutenant in the Officers Reserve Corps on 4 June 1929. On 10 January 1934, he transferred to the Virginia National Guard, joining Company L of the 2nd Battalion, 116th Infantry Regiment, which was based in Staunton. He entered active duty when the 29th Division was federalized on 3 February 1941. Howie was promoted to first lieutenant on 18 June 1941. The 29th trained at bases in Maryland, North Carolina and Florida, then moved to the United Kingdom in September 1942 and underwent further intensive training. Howie was promoted to captain on 13 April 1942 and to major on 9 November 1942. On 6 June 1944, the regiment landed at Omaha Beach on D-Day; a little more than a month later, on July 13, 1944, Major Howie was assigned to command the 3rd Battalion. On July 16, the 3rd Battalion was given the task of rescuing their comrades of the 2nd Battalion who had been surrounded and were nearly out of food and ammunition. Using only hand grenades and bayonets Howie's men broke through the German forces on the “Martinsville Line” in less than 2 hours despite being at only half strength. Howie personally led the attack and eliminated 2 enemy machine gun nests. After resupplying his fellow soldiers he then left the 2nd Battalion to defend their position, reporting that they were "too cut up", and planned to use the 3rd Battalion alone to push ahead and liberate St. Lô. On the morning of July 17, Howie phoned Major General Charles Gerhardt, the division commander, saying “Yes, we can do it” and "See you in St. Lo!"; then issued orders for the attack. Moments later he was killed by shrapnel during a mortar barrage. The next day, the 3rd Battalion entered Saint-Lô, with Howie's body on the hood of the lead jeep, at Gerhardt's order, so that Howie would be the first American to enter the town. The flag-draped body was placed in the rubble of the St. Croix Cathedral, and soldiers filed past in a show of respect. Local citizens also came out and placed flowers at the site.

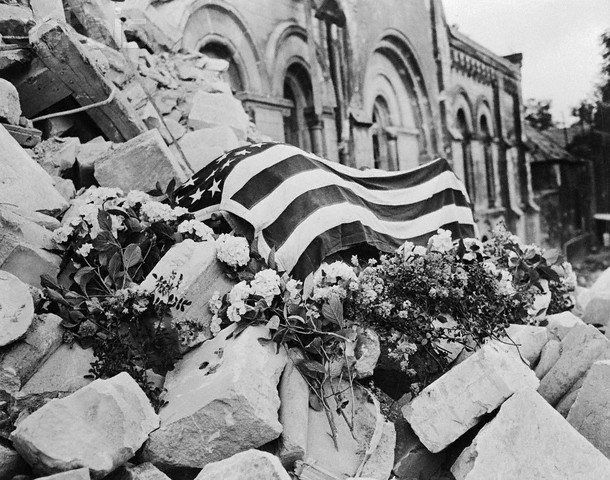
Howie's flag-draped body on the rubble of the St. Croix Cathedral in St. Lo

The photo of Howie's flag-draped body in the rubble of the St. Croix Cathedral was widely circulated in the United States and became one of the most iconic images of the war, coming to symbolize the sacrifices of Americans in the European Theater. Because of wartime security, Howie's name could not be revealed and it was only announced that the person in the photograph was "a U.S. Army major." Famed New York Times correspondent Drew Middleton dubbed Howie "The Major of St. Lo". 60 Minutes commentator Andy Rooney, then a reporter with the Stars and Stripes (newspaper), witnessed the event and called it "one of the truly heartwarming and emotional scenes of a gruesome and frightful war"; years later in a speech he stated “I guess there never was an American soldier more honored by what the people who loved him did for him after he died. There can be no doubt that Thomas Howie was a charismatic leader, a courageous soldier and a man of outstanding character". Howie is buried at the Normandy American Cemetery; a cenotaph was placed at Long Cane Cemetery in his hometown of Abbeville.

== Postwar honors ==
Staunton Military Academy honored Howie with a bust placed at Kable Hall, the administration building, and by establishing a drill team called the Howie Rifles, which is now part of the Army ROTC detachment of the Virginia Women's Institute for Leadership at Mary Baldwin College; in 1954 The Citadel erected the Howie Bell Tower next to its chapel and a mural of his body being carried into St. Lo is one of a series on school history displayed in Daniel Library. In 1956, Collier's magazine printed a story, "The Major of St. Lo" by Cornelius Ryan; it was made into an episode of the TV show Cavalcade of America that was broadcast on June 5, 1956, with Peter Graves playing the part of Howie. In 1969 as part of the 25th Anniversary of D-Day the town of St. Lo dedicated a large memorial to Howie and a plaque is on the cathedral at the site where his body had laid. The character of Captain John Miller in the movie Saving Private Ryan was largely based on Major Howie In 2003 he was enshrined in the South Carolina Hall of Fame. A historical marker stands in front of the Howie home in Abbeville and a granite monument is in the town square with the inscription “Dead in France, Deathless in Fame”; Army Reserve Centers in Greenwood, South Carolina and Staunton, Virginia are named in Howies honor.

== Awards and decorations ==
Combat Infantry Badge
Silver Star
Bronze Star
Purple Heart
Presidential Unit Citation
American Defense Service Medal
American Campaign Medal
European-African-Middle Eastern Campaign Medal
World War II Victory Medal
French Croix de guerre
Legion of Honour
