= Noel De Souza =

American actor (born 1925)

- Born: Noel John De Souzs; December 27, 1925 (age 100); India
- Occupations: Actor; journalist
- Years active: 1955–present

Noel John De Souza (born December 27, 1925) is an American actor and journalist. He is recognized as one of the earliest actors of Indian origin in Hollywood and has also built a long career as a correspondent for Indian publications, interviewing some of the most prominent figures in the film industry. His work spans acting, journalism, and later contributions to the Golden Globe Awards and fiction writing.

== Career ==
De Souza began his acting journey after training at the Pasadena Playhouse in 1955. His first television appearance was in The Loretta Young Show in 1953, where he was cast as a Mexican character, reflecting the typecasting common for ethnic actors at the time. Over the following decades, he appeared in a wide range of popular American television series, including The Man from U.N.C.L.E., Mission: Impossible, and Kolchak: The Night Stalker. In 1995, he portrayed Mahatma Gandhi in a holodeck simulation on Star Trek: Voyager, a role that highlighted his Indian heritage. His film credits include appearances in Wedding Crashers (2005) and Sofia Coppola's Somewhere (2010). Though often cast in supporting roles, his longevity and versatility made him a familiar presence in Hollywood production.

=== Journalism ===
Parallel to his acting work, De Souza pursued a career as a journalist, writing for major Indian outlets such as Times of India, Cine Blitz, Mid-Day, and Open. He became known for his interviews with Hollywood's biggest names, including Tom Cruise, Steven Spielberg, Brad Pitt, Quentin Tarantino, Martin Scorsese, Meryl Streep, Nicole Kidman, and Leonardo DiCaprio. His journalistic style focused less on promotional material and more on the personal lives and perspectives of the stars he interviewed, offering Indian readers a window into Hollywood culture. His dual identity as both actor and journalist gave him unique access and credibility in the entertainment world.

== Later years ==
In his later years, De Souza collaborated with the Hollywood Foreign Press Association and the Dick Clark Company, contributing to the Golden Globe Awards. His work in this sphere further cemented his role as a bridge between Hollywood and international audiences. In 2016, he was nominated for the International Cinematographers Guild (ICG) Publicist Media Award, recognizing his contributions to entertainment journalism. Remarkably, at the age of 100, he published his debut novel, demonstrating his enduring creativity and commitment to storytelling. His career reflects both the challenges and achievements of early Indian representation in Hollywood, and his legacy continues to inspire actors and journalists alike.

== Filmography ==
- The Big Bang Theory (2015) - Old Indian Man
- Somewhere (2010) - Indian journalist
- Wedding Crashers (2005) - Old Indian Man
- Star Trek: Voyager (1997) - Mahatma Gandhi
- Unabomber: The True Story (1997) - Juan Sanchez Arreola
- B.O.R.N. (1989) - Programmer
- Tour of Duty (1989) - Rama
- Deadly Intent (1988)
- Deadly Care (1987) - Dr. Wasanta
- MacGyver (1986) - Batu Das
- Wildcats (1986) - Doctor
- The Man with One Red Shoe (1985) - Officer
- Bring 'Em Back Alive (1982) - Darmid
- The Glove (1979) - Tab Driver
- Hanging on a Star (1978) - Guru
- Karen (1975) - Doctor
- Sanford and Son (1974) - Salim
- Kolchak: The Night Stalker (1974) - Chandr
- The Six Million Dollar Man (1974)
- Mission: Impossible (1969–1971)
- That Girl (1971) - Ambassador
- Bracken's World (1970)
- Gambit (1966)
- The Man from U.N.C.L.E. (1965–1966)
- The Outer Limits (1963)
- Wagon Train (1963)
- The Beachcomber (1962)
- Sex Kittens Go to College (1960)
- Never So Few (1959)
- Adventures in Paradise (1959) - Ananda
- Zorro (1958) - Paco
- Istanbul (1957)
- Cavalcade of America (1956)
- Jungle Jim (1955)
- The Loretta Young Show (1955)
