= Peter Lyon (author) =

American author and screenwriter

Peter Lyon (1915–1996) was an American author, biographer and radio program writer. His 1963 biography of innovative magazine editor S. S. McClure was a finalist for the National Book Award and was awarded a George Polk Award. Lyon transitioned from writing for different radio programs in the 1940s to becoming a non-fiction author and magazine reporter.

The biography detailed how McClure, as editor of his magazine McClure's, pioneered a new form of investigative journalism known as muckraking and introduced the public to some of the 20th century's most well known writers. Muckracking was a new style of investigative journalism intended to expose to the public various injustices occurring in government, commercial, educational and other institutions. McClure was the maternal grandfather of Lyon.

The biography, entitled Success Story: The Life and Times of SS McClure, was negatively reviewed in The American Historical Review. The reviewer noted that despite having a new trove of primary source material (the McClure Papers), Lyon had failed to synthesize a coherent narrative of McClure's personal life or motivations, instead mostly rehashing what was previously written about the editor. The reviewer noted that very few parts of the biography were devoted to the more turbulent and challenging latter part of McClure's life, after the golden age of the magazine (1893–1912) had passed. The reviewer concluded that: "Lyon's treatment of the magazine is as incomplete as is his portrait of McClure." The reviewer also stated that McClure's editorial decisions and leadership at the magazine are poorly explained, further concluding: "The reader receives little understanding of McClure's precise contribution to the success of the magazine" In a positive review in The New York Times, Charles Poore commended Lyon for explaining the intricacies of how McClure engaged in his novel form of investigative journalism; shedding light on unethical behaviors of individuals and groups, with the goal of bettering society. The reviewer concluded that the biography was one of the outstanding books of the year.

Lyon spent most of his career as a freelance writer. His other books included: The Wild, Wild West and Eisenhower: Portrait of the Hero. He was also a contributor to American Heritage magazine.

Early in his career, during the 1940s, Lyon was a writer for many radio programs including The March of Time, Cavalcade of America, Theater Guild on the Air, and The Eternal Light. Lyon was the president of the Radio Writer's Guild which was the predecessor to the Writers Guild of America. His radio career was abruptly ended in 1950 when he was accused of being a communist by Senator Joseph McCarthy during the Red Scare. A victim of McCarthyism, he was promptly expelled from any further radio work.
