= Transfer (propaganda) =

Projection of qualities of one entity onto another

Transfer is a technique used in propaganda and advertising. Also known as association, this is a technique of projecting positive or negative qualities (praise or blame) of a person, entity, object, or value (an individual, group, organization, nation, patriotism, etc.) to another in order to make the second more acceptable or to discredit it. It evokes an emotional response, which stimulates the target to identify with recognized authorities. Often highly visual, this technique often utilizes symbols superimposed over other visual images. An example of common use of this technique in the United States is for the President to be filmed or photographed in front of the country's flag. Another technique used is celebrity endorsement. Example of using the method for negative purpose is association of LGBTQ with pedophilia that is used by the authorities and pro-government media in Russia.

== See also ==
- Propaganda
- Advertising
- Persuasion
- Gestalt psychology
