= The Parade of States =

The Parade of States (a.k.a. The Parade of the States) was a radio series broadcast in the United States on NBC in 1931 and 1932.

Parade of States presented a tribute to a different American state each week. Sponsored by General Motors, the series aired at 8:30 pm EST on Monday evenings to 40 NBC affiliated stations.

The series premiered October 12, 1931, with a coverage of Virginia, featuring musical numbers and representative of the state. The radio actor Charles Webster read a tribute written by advertising man Bruce Barton.

The Governor of Virginia, the Chambers of Commerce in Virginia and other civic organizations were advised of the Virginia episode., which played a role in NBC's expansion. For the premiere performance, station WRVA in Richmond, Virginia was added to the coast-to-coast NBC network.

Montana and other states were covered in succeeding weeks.
