= Tales of the Texas Rangers =

Western old-time radio and television police procedural drama

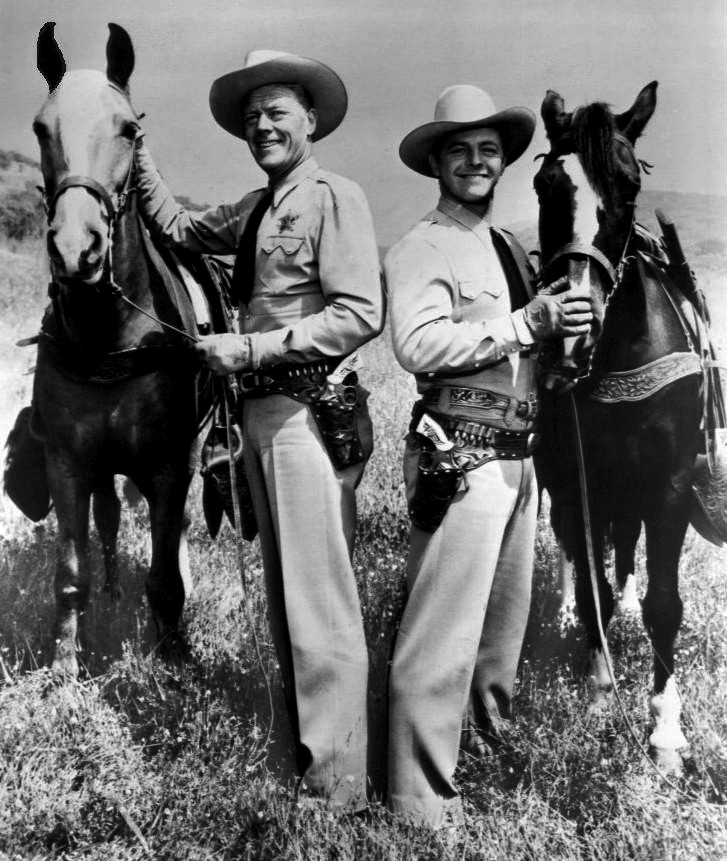
- Willard Parker (left) and Harry Lauter in 1957.
- Genre: Western
- Written by: Eric Freiwald; Robert Schaefer
- Directed by: Stacy Keach, Sr.; Lew Landers; Irving J. Moore; George Blair; Earl Bellamy; Robert G. Walker
- Starring: Willard Parker; Harry Lauter
- Opening theme: "These are Tales of Texas Rangers"
- Composer: Redd Harper
- Country of origin: United States
- Original language: English
- No. of seasons: 3
- No. of episodes: 52

Production
- Executive producers: Stacy Keach Sr.; Harry Briskin
- Producers: Stacy Keach Sr.; Colbert Clark
- Running time: 30 mins. (approx)

Original release
- Network: CBS; ABC
- Release: August 27, 1955 – December 26, 1958

Tales of the Texas Rangers is a 20th century Western old-time radio and television police procedural drama which originally aired on NBC Radio from 1950 to 1952 and later on CBS Television from 1955 to 1958. Film star Joel McCrea voiced the radio version as the fictitious Texas Ranger Jace Pearson, who uses the latest scientific techniques to identify criminals. His faithful horse, Charcoal (or "Charky"), helps Pearson to track down the culprits. The radio shows, some of which are available on the Internet, are reenactments of actual Texas Ranger cases.

The television version was produced and also directed for several episodes by Stacy Keach, Sr. It was sponsored for part of its run by Wheaties cereal. Captain Manuel T. "Lone Wolf" Gonzaullas, a legendary officer of the Texas Ranger, was the consultant for the radio and television series. The television version was filmed by Screen Gems.

On radio, Joel McCrea's Pearson often worked by request with a local sheriff's office or police department, to help resolve complex or dead-end cases (nearly always murders). The series dramatized actual cases from the 1920s to the early 1950s, a period intended to show the variety of investigations that might have been handled by a typical Texas Ranger across his career. But in the television version, Willard Parker assumed the role of Jace Pearson and had a regular partner, Ranger Clay Morgan, who had been an occasional character on the radio show. Morgan was portrayed in the television version by Harry Lauter. William Boyett appeared five times on the television series, including the role of Wade Crowell in the 1955 premiere episode, "Ransom Flight."

During the opening and closing credits of the television series, the actors march toward the camera as an off-screen men's chorus sings the theme song, "These Are Tales of Texas Rangers", to the tune of "The Eyes of Texas Are Upon You" and "I've Been Working on the Railroad". The radio series used contemporary cases and modern detective methods to solve crimes; it was a procedural drama, in many ways Jack Webb's Dragnet with a Western flavor.

The television version had some episodes set in the 1950s, comparable in some ways to Rod Cameron's syndicated series, State Trooper. Other episodes were set in the 19th century in a traditional Western genre. In each case, Parker and Lauter were involved with chases and shoot-outs.

Irving J. Moore, later with Gunsmoke, began his career as a director on two episodes of Tales of the Texas Rangers. Besides Keach and Moore, the other directors included Lew Landers, George Blair, and Earl Bellamy.

== Guest stars (TV series) ==
- Chris Alcaide, as Clint Hollister in "Uranium Pete", as Slade in "Hail to the Rangers" (both 1955), and as Ben Thomas in "Trail Herd" (1957)
- Stanley Andrews, four episodes, mainly as Marshal MacDonald
- Morris Ankrum, as Colonel Cole Bryson in "Trail Herd" (1957)
- Gregg Barton, as George Webster in "Horseman of the Sierras" (1956) and as Quiqley in "Double Reward" (1957)
- Ray Boyle, in "Streamlined Rustlers" (1957)
- Lane Bradford, as Asa Brockway in "Blazing Across the Pecos" and as Big Jack in "The Rough Tough West" (both 1955)
- X Brands, as Johnnie Tyce in "Whirlwind Raiders" (1957)
- Paul Brinegar, as the lead guest star in "The Hobo" (1956)
- Harry Cheshire, as Joe Chaney in "Desert Fury" (1958)
- Andy Clyde in "Hardrock's Dilemma" and "Double Reward" (both 1957)
- Michael Dante, as Alfred in "Edge of Danger" (1958)
- Anthony Eisley, as Jack Carr in "Kickback" (1958)
- Dick Elliott, as prospector Pete Cooper in "Uranium Pete" (1955) and as Sheriff Tiny Morris in "Both Barrels Blazine" (1957)
- Frank Ferguson, as Dembrow in "Deadfall" (1958)
- Leo Gordon, as Joe Brock in "Desert Fury" (1958)
- Ron Hagerthy, as Jim Hartley in "The Devil's Deputy" (1956)
- Don C. Harvey, as Milo Paxin in "Return of the Rough Riders" (1955)
- Harry Harvey, Jr., as Jeff Thorpe in "Traitor's Gold" (1958)
- Ed Hinton, as Matt Carter in "Blazing Across the Pecos" and as Walker in "The Rough, Tough West" (both 1955)
- I. Stanford Jolley, as Sheriff Clinton in "West of Sonora"; the sheriff fights a former outlaw for custody of a little girl.
- Jimmy Lydon, as Lt. Jared Evans in "Warpath" (1958)
- Ewing Mitchell, as Tom Weldon in "Whirlwind Raiders" (1957)
- Dennis Moore, as Jim Webb in "Panhandle" (1956)
- Burt Mustin, as Ned Watkins in "Home in San Antone" (1955)
- Gregg Palmer, as Pete Hackett in "Panhandle" (1956)
- Eddie Parker, three times and as stuntman
- John M. Pickard, as Frank Warren in "Ransom Flight", the series premiere
- Paul Picerni, as Philip Conzog in "Gypsy Boy" (1957)
- Denver Pyle, as Noah Reed in "Texas Flyer" (1958)
- Rhodes Reason, as Sheriff Tom Keever in "Uranium Pete" and as Dave in "Hail to the Rangers" (both 1955)
- Olan Soule, as Bill Peters in "Steel Trap" (1958)
- Marjorie Stapp, as Stacey Walker in "Ambush" (1958, series finale)
- Dub Taylor, as Jack Geyer in "The Fifth Plague" (1958)
- Pierre Watkin, as Ross Oliver in "Jace and Clay" (1958)
- Grant Withers, as Ramrod Johnson in "Cattle Drive" (1958)

== Radio episode log ==
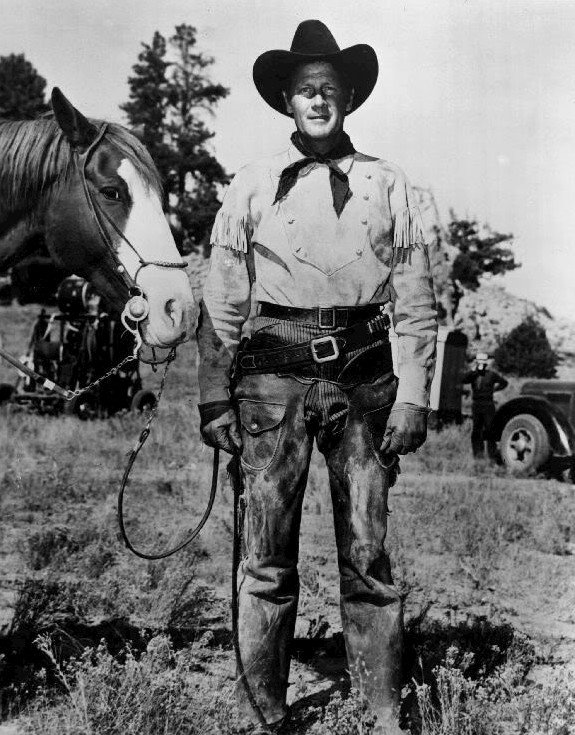
Joel McRae in publicity still issued for radio series (but actually in costume for the 1950 film The Outriders).

Number	Title	Airdate	Notes
AUD	Just A Number	04-13-50 :27:40
1	Just A Number	07-08-50 :29:40
2	The White Elephant	07-15-50 :29:40
3	Apache Peak	07-22-50 :29:40
4	The Trigger Man	07-29-50 :29:40
5	Quick Silver	08-05-50 :29:30
6	The Broken Spur	08-12-50 :29:10
7	Fool's Gold	08-19-50 :29:40
8	The Open Range	08-26-50 :29:40
9	Play For Keeps	09-02-50 :29:50
10	Dead Or Alive	09-09-50 :29:30
11	Candy Man	09-16-50 :29:40
12	Open And Shut	09-23-50 :29:20	This is the broadcast of 11-11-51 of the same title.
13	Clean Up	09-30-50 :29:40
14	Living Death	10-08-50 :29:40	Show moves to Sundays at this point
15	Dead Give-Away	10-15-50 :29:40
16	Title Unknown	10-22-50 :30:00
17	Soft Touch	10-29-50 :29:50
18	The White Suit	11-05-50 :30:00
19	Blood Relative	11-12-50 :30:00
20	Hanging By A Thread	11-26-50 :30:00	show of 11-19 Pre-Empted for Hedda Hopper Program
21	Room 114	12-03-50 :30:00
22	The Lucky Dollar	12-10-50 :30:00
23	The Cactus Pear	12-17-50 :30:00
24	Christmas Present	12-24-50 :30:00	Christmas Program
25	The Devil's Share	12-31-50 :30:00
26	Deadhead Freight	01-07-51 :30:00
27	Death In The Cards	01-14-51 :30:00
28	Blood Harvest	01-21-51 :30:00
29	Night Chase	01-28-51 :30:00
30	Logger's Larceny	02-04-51 :30:00
31	The Hatchet	02-11-51 :30:00
32	Sweet Revenge	02-18-51 :30:00
33	The Trap	02-25-51 :30:00
34	Blind Justice	03-11-51 :30:00	Show of 3/4 Pre-empted for "Theatre Guild's" HAMLET
35	Death By Adoption	03-18-51 :30:00
36	Breakdown	03-25-51 :30:00
37	Pressure	04-01-51 :30:00
38	Bad Blood	04-08-51 :30:00
39	Conspiracy	04-15-51 :30:00
40	Canned Death	04-22-51 :30:00
41	Title Unknown	04-29-51 :30:00
42	No Living Witnesses	05-06-51 :30:00
43	Paid In Full	05-13-51 :30:00
44	Squaredance	05-20-51 :30:00
45	Joy Ride	05-27-51 :30:00
46	Death Shaft	09-30-51 :30:00
47	The Wheelchair Killer	10-07-51 :30:00
48	Play For Keeps	10-14-51 :30:00
49	Fugitive Trail	10-21-51 :30:00
50	The White Elephant	10-28-51 :30:00
51	Helping Hand	11-04-51 :30:00
52	Open And Shut	11-11-51 :30:00
53	Wild Crop	11-18-51 :30:00
54	The Blow Off	11-25-51 :30:00
55	The Dead Give-Away	12-02-51 :30:00
56	Death Plant	12-09-51 :30:00
57	Pick-Up	12-16-51 :30:00
58	Christmas Payoff	12-23-51 :30:00	Christmas Program
59	Killer's Crop	12-30-51 :30:00
60	Birds Of A Feather	01-06-52 :30:00
61	Clip Job	01-13-52 :30:00
62	Blood Trail	01-20-52 :30:00
63	Night Chase	01-27-52 :30:00
64	The Rub Out	02-03-52 :30:00
65	Hitchhiker	02-10-52 :30:00
66	Cold Blood	02-17-52 :27:20
67	Bright Boy	02-24-52 :30:00
68	The Ice Man	03-02-52 :30:00
69	Dream Farm	03-09-52 :30:00
70	Prelude To Felony	03-16-52 :30:00
71	Nighthawk	03-30-52 :30:00	Program of 3-23 Preempted
72	Troop Train	04-06-52 :30:00
73	Uncertain Death	04-13-52 :30:00
74	Illusion	04-20-52 :30:00
75	Address Unknown	04-27-52 :30:00
76	Little Sister	05-04-52 :30:00
77	Unleashed Fury	05-11-52 :30:00
78	Smart Kill	05-18-52 :30:00
79	Jailbird	05-25-52 :30:00
80	Sell-Out	06-01-52 :30:00
81	Illegal Entry	06-08-52 :30:00
82	Travesty	06-15-52 :30:00
83	Knockout	06-22-52 :30:00
84	Ex-Con	06-29-52 :30:00
85	The Boomerang	07-06-52 :30:00
86	Finger Man	07-13-52 :30:00
87	Round Trip	07-20-52 :30:00
88	Stick-Up	07-27-52 :30:00
89	Double Edge	08-03-52 :30:00
90	Last Stop	08-10-52 :30:00
91	Cover-Up	08-17-52 :30:00
92	Three Victims	08-24-52 :30:00
93	Misplaced Person	08-31-52 :30:00
94	Alibi	09-07-52 :30:00
95	Drive-In	09-14-52 :30:00

== Comic book adaptations ==
The series was adapted into a comic book distributed by Dell Comics and drawn by Dan Spiegle. It also inspired Willy Vandersteen's Suske en Wiske album De Texasrakkers.
