= Robert G. Walker =

American television director

- Born: Robert Glen Walker; December 22, 1917; Lynn, Massachusetts, U.S.
- Died: February 7, 1988 (aged 70)
- Occupation: Television director

Robert Glen Walker (December 22, 1917 – February 7, 1988) was an American television director. He directed for television programs including Tales of the Texas Rangers, The Roy Rogers Show, The Adventures of Rin Tin Tin, Rescue 8, Circus Boy, Captain Midnight and Annie Oakley.
