= Everett Glass =

American actor (1891–1966)

- Born: 23 July 1891; Bangor, Maine, United States
- Died: 22 March 1966 (aged 74)
- Education: Amherst College
- Occupation: character actor
- Years active: 1940s–1960s
- Known for: more than 80 films and TV shows

Everett Glass (July 23, 1891 – March 22, 1966) was an American character actor who appeared in more than eighty films and television shows from the 1940s through the 1960s, including Invasion of the Body Snatchers (1956) and episodes of Adventures of Superman, Lassie, and Perry Mason. He began as a stage actor and had a long career as a theatre director and playwright before coming to Hollywood in his 50s.

== Career ==
Everett William Glass was born in Bangor, Maine and attended Amherst College, where he was on the editorial staff of the Amherst Monthly. By 1916 he was living in Boston and working as assistant to the Polish emigre director Richard Ordynski in producing Henry IV for the Shakespeare Tercentenery. In 1917 he was one of the original members of the permanent company of the Greenwich Village Theatre in New York.

In 1926 Glass was in Berkeley, California, where he received rave reviews for his starring role in The Drunkard, a comedy. By 1928 he was directing at the Berkeley Playhouse and in charge of the Wheeler Hall Plays series at the University of California, a position he held into the 1930s. After 1938 he was also writing as well as directing plays, such as "Princes, Ltd." (a comedy), "Summer Heat", and "Coolhaven" (a horror story).

Glass began his career as a film actor in 1948, with uncredited appearances in four films, and ten more in 1949. His first credited part was in Easy Living (1949). Glass found more regular work in television, starting with an episode of Family Theatre in 1951, and in the Fireside Theatre (1952), where he played in seven episodes. He eventually appeared in episodes of dozens of television shows in the 1950s and early 1960s, from The Twilight Zone to Rawhide, usually playing a scientist, judge, elder, or some equally distinguished character role. He retired from acting in 1962 following an appearance on Perry Mason as Carlton Gage in "The Case of the Capricious Corpse." He died in 1966 in Los Angeles.

== Selected filmography ==
- Beyond Glory (1948) – West Point Investigation Board Member (uncredited)
- The Girl from Manhattan (1948) – Committeeman (uncredited)
- Joan of Arc (1948) – Judge Anselene (uncredited)
- The Lucky Stiff (1949) – Henry – Waiter (uncredited)
- Act of Violence (1949) – Hotel Night Clerk (uncredited)
- Alias Nick Beal (1949) – Party Guest (uncredited)
- The Undercover Man (1949) – Judge Allen F. Parker (uncredited)
- The Great Sinner (1949) – Pince-Nez Man at Casino (uncredited)
- The Secret of St. Ives (1949) – Priest (uncredited)
- In the Good Old Summertime (1949) – Doctor (uncredited)
- Easy Living (1949) – Virgil Ryan
- Pinky (1949) – Jeffers Wooley (uncredited)
- The Reckless Moment (1949) – Drug Clerk (uncredited)
- Bride for Sale (1949) – Willie (uncredited)
- And Baby Makes Three (1949) – Minister (uncredited)
- Key to the City (1950) – Elderly Gentleman (uncredited)
- Young Man with a Horn (1950) – Mission Song Leader (uncredited)
- When Willie Comes Marching Home (1950) – Colonel J.W. Hollingsworth (uncredited)
- Tarnished (1950) – Jake Patterson (uncredited)
- Mother Didn't Tell Me (1950) – Reverend (uncredited)
- Rock Island Trail (1950) – Judge (uncredited)
- Father Makes Good (1950) – Proprietor (uncredited)
- The Big Hangover (1950) – Alumni Dinner Headwaiter (uncredited)
- Destination Moon (1950) – Mr. La Porte (uncredited)
- The Petty Girl (1950) – Professor Haughton (uncredited)
- The Killer That Stalked New York (1950) – Elderly Doctor (uncredited)
- Two Flags West (1950) – Rev. Simpkins (uncredited)
- Two Weeks with Love (1950) – Mr. Hibbs (uncredited)
- Counterspy Meets Scotland Yard (1950) – Hugo Borin aka Dr. Victor Ritter
- The Magnificent Yankee (1950) – Justice Peckham (uncredited)
- The Thing from Another World (1951) – Dr. Wilson (uncredited)
- My Forbidden Past (1951) – Elderly Doctor (uncredited)
- Best of the Badmen (1951) – Doctor (uncredited)
- A Millionaire for Christy (1951) – Dr. Whipple (uncredited)
- Journey Into Light (1951) – Deacon Adams
- Flight to Mars (1951) – Montar (uncredited)
- Too Young to Kiss (1951) – Village Druggist (uncredited)
- The Greatest Show on Earth (1952) – Board Member (uncredited)
- Deadline – U.S.A. (1952) – Doctor Emanuel (uncredited)
- Macao (1952) – Garcia (uncredited)
- Belles on Their Toes (1952) – Faculty Member (uncredited)
- Paula (1952) – Professor (uncredited)
- The Girl in White (1952) – Dean (uncredited)
- Three for Bedroom "C" (1952) – Dr. Radcliffe (uncredited)
- Dreamboat (1952) – George Bradley (uncredited)
- O. Henry's Full House (1952) – Desk Clerk (uncredited)
- The Merry Widow (1952) – Putney (uncredited)
- Horizons West (1952) – Judge Smithers (uncredited)
- Call Me Madam (1953) – Announcer at Sally's Party (uncredited)
- Inferno (1953) – Mason, Carson's Butler (uncredited)
- Three Sailors and a Girl (1953) – Bank Client (uncredited)
- Demetrius and the Gladiators (1954) – Kaeso (uncredited)
- Day of Triumph (1954) – Annas
- The Purple Mask (1955) – Father Brochard
- Trial (1955) – George – Law School Dean (uncredited)
- Invasion of the Body Snatchers (1956) – Dr. Ed Pursey
- World Without End (1956) – Timmek
- The Harder They Fall (1956) – Minister (uncredited)
- Friendly Persuasion (1956) – Brother Amos – Elder (uncredited)
- Alfred Hitchcock Presents (1956) (Season 1 Episode 22: "Place of Shadows") - Brother Giles
- The Quiet Gun (1957) – Circuit Judge (uncredited)
- Pal Joey (1957) – Pet Store Owner (uncredited)
- Gunman's Walk (1958) – The Reverend Arthur Stotheby (uncredited)
- Alfred Hitchcock Presents (1959) (Season 4 Episode 31: "Your Witness") - Judge
- A Summer Place (1959) – Dean (uncredited)
- Elmer Gantry (1960) – Reverend Brown (uncredited)
- " The Twilight Zone" (1961) S2 E25 "The Silence" - as a member of an exclusive gentleman's club who witnesses a bizarre wager.
- The Marriage-Go-Round (1961) – Older Professor (uncredited)
- Susan Slade (1961) – Mr. White (uncredited)
