= David McMahon =

Australian rules footballer (born 1951)

Personal information
- Born: 19 October 1951 (age 75)
- Original team: Ivanhoe / Preston
- Height: 180 cm (5 ft 11 in)
- Weight: 83 kg (183 lb)

Playing career^{1}
Years	Club	Games (Goals)
1973–1984	Fitzroy	218 (236)
- ^{1} Playing statistics correct to the end of 1984.

David McMahon (born 19 October 1951) is a former Australian rules footballer who played with Fitzroy in the VFL.

McMahon played on the half forward flank and after being recruited from Preston he made his league debut in 1973. He retired in 1984 with 218 VFL games to his name which puts him at 7th on the all-time list for the Fitzroy Football club.
