= List of adventure films of the 1950s =

A list of adventure films released in the 1950s.

== 1950 ==
Title	Director	Cast	Country	Subgenre/Notes
Abbott and Costello in the Foreign Legion	Charles Lamont	Bud Abbott, Lou Costello, Patricia Medina, Walter Slezak	United States	Adventure comedy
The Adventurers of the Air	René Jayet	Ginette Leclerc, Yves Furet, Jean Murat, Elina Labourdette	France	
The Avengers	John H. Auer	John Carroll, Adele Mara	United States	
The Bandit Queen	William Berke	Barbara Britton	United States	Western
Bitter Springs	Ralph Smart	Tommy Trinder, Chips Rafferty, Gordon Jackson	Australia; United Kingdom	
Black Jack	Julien Duvivier	George Sanders, Patricia Roc, Herbert Marshall, Agnes Moorehead, Marcel Dalio	France; United States; Spain	Sea adventure
The Black Rose	Henry Hathaway	Tyrone Power, Orson Welles, Cécile Aubry, Jack Hawkins	United States	
Bomba 3: The Lost Volcano	Ford Beebe	Johnny Sheffield	United States	
Bomba 4: The Hidden City	Ford Beebe	Johnny Sheffield	United States	
The Breaking Point	Michael Curtiz	John Garfield, Patricia Neal	United States	Sea adventure
Buccaneer's Girl	Fred de Cordova	Yvonne De Carlo, Philip Friend, Robert Douglas	United States	Pirate film
Captain China	Lewis R. Foster	John Payne, Gail Russell	United States	Sea adventure
Cargo to Capetown	Earl McEvoy	Broderick Crawford, John Ireland, Ellen Drew	United States	Sea adventure
Cartouche, King of Paris	Guillaume Radot	Roger Pigaut	France	
The Count of Saint Elmo	Guido Brignone	Massimo Serato, Anna Maria Ferrero, Nelly Corradi	Italy	
The Desert Hawk	Fred de Cordova	Yvonne De Carlo, Richard Greene	United States	
Destination Moon	Irving Pichel	John Archer, Warner Anderson, Tom Powers, Dick Wesson	United States	Space adventure
Don Juan	José Luis Sáenz de Heredia	António Vilar, Annabella, María Rosa Salgado	Spain	
The Eagle and the Hawk	Lewis R. Foster	John Payne, Rhonda Fleming, Dennis O'Keefe	United States	Western
The Elusive Pimpernel	Michael Powell, Emeric Pressburger	David Niven, Margaret Leighton, Jack Hawkins	United Kingdom	
The Flame and the Arrow	Jacques Tourneur	Burt Lancaster, Virginia Mayo, Robert Douglas	United States	
Forbidden Jungle	Robert Emmett Tansey	Don C. Harvey, Forrest Taylor, Alyce Lewis	United States	
Fortunes of Captain Blood	Gordon Douglas	Louis Hayward, Patricia Medina, George Macready	United States	Pirate film
Golden Salamander	Ronald Neame	Trevor Howard, Anouk Aimée, Herbert Lom, Walter Rilla	United Kingdom	
The Iroquois Trail	Phil Karlson	George Montgomery, Brenda Marshall	United States	Western
Killer Shark	Budd Boetticher	Roddy McDowall	United States	Sea adventure
The Man from Jamaica	Maurice de Canonge	Pierre Brasseur, Véra Norman	France	
Jungle Jim 3: Mark of the Gorilla	William Berke	Johnny Weissmuller	United States	
Jungle Jim 4: Captive Girl	William Berke	Johnny Weissmuller, Buster Crabbe	United States	
Jungle Jim 5: Pygmy Island	William Berke	Johnny Weissmuller, Ann Savage	United States	
Kim	Victor Saville	Errol Flynn, Dean Stockwell, Paul Lukas, Robert Douglas	United States	
King Solomon's Mines	Compton Bennett, Andrew Marton	Stewart Granger, Deborah Kerr, Richard Carlson	United States	Romantic adventure
Kon-Tiki	Thor Heyerdahl		Norway; Sweden	Documentary, sea adventure
Last of the Buccaneers	Lew Landers	Paul Henreid	United States	Pirate film
The Lion of Amalfi	Pietro Francisci	Vittorio Gassman, Milly Vitale	Italy	
The Mark of the Fox	Gilberto Martínez Solares	Germán Valdés, Silvia Pinal	Mexico	Adventure comedy
The Mystery of the Snakeskin Belt	Frank Cadman	Colin Barlow, Ursula Strachey	United Kingdom	Serial, family-oriented adventure
Mystery Submarine	H. Bruce Humberstone	Macdonald Carey, Märta Torén, Robert Douglas, Carl Esmond	United States	
On the Isle of Samoa	William Berke	Jon Hall	United States	
Operation Haylift	William Berke	Bill Williams, Ann Rutherford, Tom Brown	United States	
Pirates of the High Seas	Spencer Gordon Bennet, Thomas Carr	Buster Crabbe	United States	Serial, sea adventure
Prehistoric Women	Gregg G. Tallas	Laurette Luez, Allan Nixon, Joan Shawlee, Judy Landon	United States	
The Reluctant Widow	Bernard Knowles	Jean Kent, Guy Rolfe	United Kingdom	
Rocketship X-M	Kurt Neumann	Lloyd Bridges, Osa Massen, John Emery, Noah Beery Jr., Hugh O'Brian	United States	Space adventure
Rogues of Sherwood Forest	Gordon Douglas	John Derek, Diana Lynn	United States	
Shadow of the Eagle	Sidney Salkow	Richard Greene, Valentina Cortese	United Kingdom; Italy	
Sinbad the Seasick	Gilberto Martínez Solares	Germán Valdés	Mexico	Adventure comedy
South Sea Sinner	H. Bruce Humberstone	Shelley Winters, Macdonald Carey	United States	
State Secret	Sidney Gilliat	Douglas Fairbanks Jr., Glynis Johns, Jack Hawkins, Walter Rilla, Karel Stepanek, Herbert Lom	United Kingdom	
Tarzan and the Slave Girl	Lee Sholem	Lex Barker, Denise Darcel	United States	
Timber Fury	Bernard B. Ray	David Bruce	United States	
The Thief of Venice	John Brahm	Maria Montez, Paul Hubschmid, Massimo Serato	Italy; United States	
Treasure Island	Byron Haskin	Robert Newton, Bobby Driscoll	United States; United Kingdom	Sea adventure, pirate film
Tripoli	Will Price	Maureen O'Hara, John Payne	United States	
Two Lost Worlds	Norman Dawn	James Arness, Kasey Rogers, Bill Kennedy	United States	Sea adventure, fantasy
Tyrant of the Sea	Lew Landers	Rhys Williams, Ron Randell	United States	Sea adventure
The White Hell of Pitz Palu	Rolf Hansen	Hans Albers, Liselotte Pulver, Adrian Hoven	West Germany	Mountaineering adventure
The White Tower	Ted Tetzlaff	Glenn Ford, Claude Rains, Lloyd Bridges, Alida Valli, Oskar Homolka	United States	Mountaineering adventure
Women and Brigands	Mario Soldati	Amedeo Nazzari, Maria Mauban, Paolo Stoppa	Italy; France	
Young Daniel Boone	Reginald LeBorg	David Bruce, Kristine Miller	United States	Western

== 1951 ==
Title	Director	Cast	Country	Subgenre/Notes
Across the Wide Missouri	William A. Wellman	Clark Gable, Ricardo Montalbán, Adolphe Menjou, María Elena Marqués	United States	Western
The Adventurers	David MacDonald	Jack Hawkins, Dennis Price, Grégoire Aslan	United Kingdom	
Adventures of Captain Fabian	William Marshall	Errol Flynn, Micheline Presle, Vincent Price, Agnes Moorehead	United States; France	
The African Queen	John Huston	Humphrey Bogart, Katharine Hepburn, Robert Morley	United States; United Kingdom	
Anne of the Indies	Jacques Tourneur	Jean Peters, Louis Jourdan, Debra Paget, Herbert Marshall	United States	
Atoll K	Léo Joannon, John Berry	Stan Laurel, Oliver Hardy, Suzy Delair	France; Italy	Adventure comedy
The Barefoot Mailman	Earl McEvoy	Robert Cummings, Terry Moore, Jerome Courtland	United States	Adventure comedy
The Big Gusher	Lew Landers	Wayne Morris, Preston Foster, Dorothy Patrick	United States	
Bird of Paradise	Delmer Daves	Louis Jourdan, Debra Paget, Jeff Chandler	United States	
The Black Captain	Giorgio Ansoldi, Alberto Pozzetti	Steve Barclay, Marina Berti, Paul Muller	Italy	
Bomba 5: The Lion Hunters	Ford Beebe	Johnny Sheffield	United States	
Bomba 6: Elephant Stampede	Ford Beebe	Johnny Sheffield	United States	
Captain Ardant	André Zwoboda	Yves Vincent, Renée Saint-Cyr, Jean Danet	France	
Captain Horatio Hornblower	Raoul Walsh	Gregory Peck, Virginia Mayo, Robert Beatty	United Kingdom; United States	Sea adventure
The Captain of Venice	Gianni Puccini	Leonardo Cortese, Mariella Lotti, Andrea Checchi	Italy	
China Corsair	Ray Nazarro	Jon Hall, Lisa Ferraday, Ron Randell, Ernest Borgnine	United States	Sea adventure
Crosswinds	Lewis R. Foster	John Payne, Rhonda Fleming	United States	Sea adventure
Dakota 308	Jacques Daniel-Norman	Jean Pâqui, Suzy Carrier, Louis Seigner, Ketty Kerviel	France	
Darling Caroline	Richard Pottier	Martine Carol, Jacques Dacqmine, Marie Déa, Raymond Souplex, Jacques Clancy, Pierre Cressoy, Alfred Adam	France	
Dawn of America	Juan de Orduña	António Vilar	Spain	Sea adventure
Dick Turpin's Ride	Ralph Murphy	Louis Hayward, Patricia Medina	United States	
Double Crossbones	Charles Barton	Donald O'Connor, Helena Carter	United States	Adventure comedy
Duel in Dakar	Georges Combret, Claude Orval	Maurice Régamey, Lysiane Rey, Pierre Cressoy	France	
Flame of Araby	Charles Lamont	Maureen O'Hara, Jeff Chandler	United States	
Flight to Mars	Lesley Selander	Marguerite Chapman, Cameron Mitchell, Arthur Franz	United States	Space adventure
The Golden Horde	George Sherman	Ann Blyth, David Farrar	United States	
The Highwayman	Lesley Selander	Philip Friend, Charles Coburn	United States	
Hurricane Island	Lew Landers	Jon Hall, Marie Windsor	United States	
Jungle Headhunters	Lewis Cotlow		United States	Documentary
Jungle Jim 6: Fury of the Congo	William Berke	Johnny Weissmuller	United States	
Jungle Jim 7: Jungle Manhunt	Lew Landers	Johnny Weissmuller	United States	
The King's Mail	Ricardo Gascón	Cesare Danova	Spain	
Lorna Doone	Phil Karlson	Barbara Hale, Richard Greene	United States	
Lost Continent	Sam Newfield	Cesar Romero, Hillary Brooke, Acquanetta	United States	Fantasy adventure
The Magic Carpet	Lew Landers	Lucille Ball, John Agar, Patricia Medina, Raymond Burr	United States	
The Mark of the Renegade	Hugo Fregonese	Ricardo Montalbán, Cyd Charisse, Gilbert Roland, J. Carrol Naish	United States	
Mask of the Avenger	Phil Karlson	John Derek, Anthony Quinn, Jody Lawrance	United States	
Mysterious Island	Spencer Gordon Bennet	Richard Crane	United States	Serial
Outcast of the Islands	Carol Reed	Trevor Howard, Kerima, Ralph Richardson, Robert Morley, Wendy Hiller	United Kingdom	
Peking Express	William Dieterle	Joseph Cotten, Corinne Calvet, Edmund Gwenn	United States	
The Prince Who Was a Thief	Rudolph Maté	Tony Curtis, Piper Laurie	United States	
Quebec	George Templeton	John Drew Barrymore, Corinne Calvet, Barbara Rush, Patric Knowles	United States	
Revenge of Black Eagle	Riccardo Freda	Rossano Brazzi, Gianna Maria Canale	Italy	
Revenge of the Pirates	Primo Zeglio	Maria Montez, Jean-Pierre Aumont, Milly Vitale, Paul Muller	Italy	
Sadan miekan mies	Ilmari Unho	Kalervo Nissilä	Finland	
Savage Drums	William Berke	Sabu	United States	
The Sea Hornet	Joseph Kane	Rod Cameron	United States	Sea adventure
Sirocco	Curtis Bernhardt	Humphrey Bogart, Lee J. Cobb, Zero Mostel, Märta Torén	United States	
Smuggler's Gold	William Berke	Cameron Mitchell, Amanda Blake	United States	Sea adventure
Smuggler's Island	Edward Ludwig	Jeff Chandler	United States	Sea adventure
Soldiers Three	Tay Garnett	Stewart Granger, Walter Pidgeon, David Niven, Robert Newton	United States	
Un sourire dans la tempête	René Chanas	Roger Pigaut, Jean-Pierre Kérien, Richard Ney, Michèle Martin	France; West Germany	Arctic adventure
Strange World	Franz Eichhorn	Angelika Hauff, Helmuth Schneider	Brazil; West Germany	
Superman and the Mole Men	Lee Sholem	George Reeves, Phyllis Coates	United States	
The Sword of Monte Cristo	Maurice Geraghty	Rita Corday, George Montgomery	United States	
Tales of Robin Hood	James Tinling	Robert Clarke, Mary Hatcher	United States	
Tarzan's Peril	Byron Haskin	Lex Barker, Dorothy Dandridge	United States	
Ten Tall Men	Willis Goldbeck	Burt Lancaster, Jody Lawrance, Gilbert Roland	United States	
Where No Vultures Fly	Harry Watt	Anthony Steel	United Kingdom	
Yellow Fin	Frank McDonald	Wayne Morris	United States	Sea adventure

== 1952 ==
Title	Director	Cast	Country	Subgenre/Notes
Abbott and Costello Meet Captain Kidd	Charles Lamont	Bud Abbott, Lou Costello, Charles Laughton	United States	Adventure comedy, pirate film
Against All Flags	George Sherman	Errol Flynn, Maureen O'Hara, Anthony Quinn	United States	Pirate film
Aladdin and His Lamp	Lew Landers	Patricia Medina, Johnny Sands	United States	Fantasy adventure
Arctic Flight	Lew Landers	Wayne Morris, Alan Hale Jr., Lola Albright	United States	Arctic adventure
At Sword's Edge	Carlo Ludovico Bragaglia	Frank Latimore, Milly Vitale	Italy	
At Sword's Point	Lewis Allen	Cornel Wilde, Maureen O'Hara, Robert Douglas, Dan O'Herlihy	United States	
The Bandit of Tacca Del Lupo	Pietro Germi	Amedeo Nazzari	Italy	
The Big Sky	Howard Hawks	Kirk Douglas, Dewey Martin, Elizabeth Threatt	United States	Western
The Black Mask	Filippo Walter Ratti	Cesare Danova	Italy	
Blackbeard the Pirate	Raoul Walsh	Robert Newton, Linda Darnell, William Bendix	United States	Pirate film
The Blazing Forest	Edward Ludwig	John Payne, Agnes Moorehead	United States	
Bomba 7: African Treasure	Ford Beebe	Johnny Sheffield	United States	
Bomba 8: Bomba and the Jungle Girl	Ford Beebe	Johnny Sheffield	United States	
The Brigand	Phil Karlson	Anthony Dexter, Anthony Quinn, Jody Lawrance	United States	
Buridan, héros de la tour de Nesle	Émile Couzinet	Jacques Torrens, Clarisse Deudon, Georges Rollin	France	
Bwana Devil	Arch Oboler	Robert Stack, Barbara Britton, Nigel Bruce	United States	
California Conquest	Lew Landers	Cornel Wilde, Teresa Wright	United States	Western
A Caprice of Darling Caroline	Jean Devaivre	Martine Carol, Jean-Claude Pascal, Jacques Dacqmine	France	Romantic adventure
Captain Pirate	Ralph Murphy	Louis Hayward, Patricia Medina	United States	Pirate film
Caribbean Gold	Edward Ludwig	John Payne, Arlene Dahl, Cedric Hardwicke	United States	
The Crimson Pirate	Robert Siodmak	Burt Lancaster, Eva Bartok, Nick Cravat	United States; United Kingdom	
Desperate Search	Joseph H. Lewis	Howard Keel, Jane Greer, Patricia Medina, Keenan Wynn	United States	
The Dream of Zorro	Mario Soldati	Walter Chiari, Vittorio Gassman	Italy	Adventure comedy
Fanfan la Tulipe	Christian-Jaque	Gérard Philipe, Gina Lollobrigida, Marcel Herrand	France; Italy	
The Fighter	Herbert Kline	Richard Conte, Vanessa Brown, Lee J. Cobb	United States	
La figlia del diavolo	Primo Zeglio	Marina Vlady, Massimo Serato	Italy	
The Golden Coach	Jean Renoir	Anna Magnani, Duncan Lamont, Paul Campbell, Jean Debucourt, Odoardo Spadaro, Riccardo Rioli	France; Italy	Romantic adventure
The Golden Hawk	Sidney Salkow	Rhonda Fleming, Sterling Hayden	United States	Pirate film
Hong Kong	Lewis R. Foster	Ronald Reagan, Rhonda Fleming	United States	
Hurricane Smith	Jerry Hopper	John Ireland, Yvonne de Carlo	United States	Sea adventure
Ivanhoe	Richard Thorpe	Robert Taylor, Elizabeth Taylor, Joan Fontaine, George Sanders, Robert Douglas	United States; United Kingdom	Romantic adventure
Jolanda, the Daughter of the Black Corsair	Mario Soldati	May Britt, Marc Lawrence, Renato Salvatori	Italy	
Jungle Jim 8: Jungle Jim in the Forbidden Land	Lew Landers	Johnny Weissmuller	United States	
Jungle Jim 9: Voodoo Tiger	Spencer Gordon Bennet	Johnny Weissmuller	United States	
Kaadu	William Berke	Rod Cameron, Cesar Romero, Marie Windsor	United States; India	Fantasy adventure
King of the Congo (The Mighty Thun'da)	Spencer Gordon Bennet, Wallace Grissell	Buster Crabbe	United States	Serial
Klettermaxe	Kurt Hoffmann	Liselotte Pulver, Albert Lieven, Hubert von Meyerinck	West Germany	Adventure comedy
Lady in the Iron Mask	Ralph Murphy	Louis Hayward, Patricia Medina	United States	
Last Train from Bombay	Fred F. Sears	Jon Hall	United States	
Lost in Alaska	Jean Yarbrough	Bud Abbott, Lou Costello	United States	Adventure comedy
Lure of the Wilderness	Jean Negulesco	Jean Peters, Jeffrey Hunter, Constance Smith, Walter Brennan	United States	
Lydia Bailey	Jean Negulesco	Anne Francis, Dale Robertson	United States	
Macao	Josef von Sternberg	Robert Mitchum, Jane Russell, William Bendix, Gloria Grahame	United States	
Manina, the Girl in the Bikini	Willy Rozier	Brigitte Bardot, Jean-François Calvé, Howard Vernon	France	Sea adventure
Mara Maru	Gordon Douglas	Errol Flynn, Ruth Roman, Raymond Burr	United States	Sea adventure
Milady and the Musketeers	Vittorio Cottafavi	Rossano Brazzi, Yvette Lebon, Armando Francioli, Massimo Serato	Italy; France	
The Mute of Portici	Giorgio Ansoldi	Flora Mariel, Doris Duranti, Paolo Carlini	Italy	
Mutiny	Edward Dmytryk	Mark Stevens, Angela Lansbury, Patric Knowles	United States	Sea adventure
The Pathfinder	Sidney Salkow	George Montgomery, Jay Silverheels	United States	Western
The Phantom Musketeer	Max Calandri	Vasito Bastino, Rossana Podestà, Tamara Lees	Italy	
The Planter's Wife	Ken Annakin	Claudette Colbert, Jack Hawkins, Anthony Steel	United Kingdom	
Plymouth Adventure	Clarence Brown	Spencer Tracy, Gene Tierney, Van Johnson, Leo Genn	United States	Sea adventure
The Prisoner of Zenda	Richard Thorpe	Stewart Granger, Deborah Kerr, James Mason, Louis Calhern, Robert Douglas, Jane Greer	United States	Romantic adventure
Red Shirts	Goffredo Alessandrini, Francesco Rosi	Anna Magnani, Raf Vallone, Serge Reggiani, Alain Cuny, Jacques Sernas	Italy; France	
Red Skies of Montana	Joseph M. Newman	Richard Widmark, Jeffrey Hunter, Constance Smith	United States	
Road to Bali	Norman Z. McLeod	Bob Hope, Bing Crosby, Dorothy Lamour	United States	Adventure comedy
Scaramouche	George Sidney	Stewart Granger, Mel Ferrer, Eleanor Parker, Janet Leigh	United States	
Sea Tiger	Frank McDonald	Marguerite Chapman, John Archer, Harry Lauter	United States	Sea adventure
The Secret of Three Points	Carlo Ludovico Bragaglia	Massimo Girotti, Tamara Lees	Italy	
The Snows of Kilimanjaro	Henry King	Gregory Peck, Susan Hayward, Ava Gardner, Hildegard Knef	United States	
Son of Ali Baba	Kurt Neumann	Tony Curtis, Piper Laurie	United States	
Son of the Hunchback	Fernando Cerchio	Rossano Brazzi, Milly Vitale	Italy; France	
Storm Over Tibet	Andrew Marton	Rex Reason, Diana Douglas	United States	Mountaineering adventure
The Story of Robin Hood	Ken Annakin	Richard Todd, Peter Finch, Joan Rice, James Robertson Justice	United States	
Tarzan's Savage Fury	Cy Endfield	Lex Barker, Patric Knowles	United States	
Thief of Damascus	Will Jason	Paul Henreid	United States	
The Three Pirates	Mario Soldati	Ettore Manni, Marc Lawrence, Renato Salvatori, Cesare Danova	Italy	Pirate film
Thunder in the East	Charles Vidor	Alan Ladd, Deborah Kerr, Charles Boyer	United States	
Towers of Silence	Hans Bertram	Philip Dorn, Gisela Uhlen, Carl Raddatz	West Germany	
The Treasure of Lost Canyon	Ted Tetzlaff	William Powell	United States	
Untamed Women	W. Merle Connel	Mikel Conrad, Doris Merrick	United States	
Velké dobrodružství	Miloš Makovec	Otomar Krejča	Czechoslovakia	
Viva Zapata!	Elia Kazan	Marlon Brando, Jean Peters, Anthony Quinn, Joseph Wiseman	United States	
Way of a Gaucho	Jacques Tourneur	Rory Calhoun, Gene Tierney	United States	
Wings of Danger	Terence Fisher	Zachary Scott, Robert Beatty	United Kingdom	
The Wonderful Adventures of Guerrin Meschino	Pietro Francisci	Gino Leurini, Leonora Ruffo, Tamara Lees	Italy	
The World in His Arms	Raoul Walsh	Gregory Peck, Anthony Quinn, Ann Blyth	United States	Sea adventure
A Yank in Indo-China	Wallace Grissell	John Archer	United States	
Yankee Buccaneer	Fred de Cordova	Jeff Chandler, Scott Brady	United States	Sea adventure

== 1953 ==
Title	Director	Cast	Country	Subgenre/Notes
The Adventurer of Chad	Willy Rozier	Madeleine Lebeau, Jean Danet	France	
Alarm in Morocco	Jean Devaivre	Jean-Claude Pascal, Gianna Maria Canale, Erich von Stroheim, Peter van Eyck	France	
All the Brothers Were Valiant	Richard Thorpe	Robert Taylor, Stewart Granger, Ann Blyth	United States	Sea adventure
Appointment in Honduras	Jacques Tourneur	Glenn Ford, Ann Sheridan, Zachary Scott, Jack Elam	United States	
Back to God's Country	Joseph Pevney	Rock Hudson, Steve Cochran, Hugh O'Brian, Marcia Henderson	United States	
The Bandits of Corsica	Ray Nazarro	Richard Greene, Raymond Burr	United States	
Beat the Devil	John Huston	Humphrey Bogart, Jennifer Jones, Gina Lollobrigida, Robert Morley, Peter Lorre	United States; United Kingdom; Italy	Adventure comedy
The Beggar's Opera	Peter Brook	Laurence Olivier	United Kingdom	Adventure comedy
Beneath the 12-Mile Reef	Robert D. Webb	Robert Wagner, Gilbert Roland, Terry Moore	United States	Sea adventure, adventure Drama
Blowing Wild	Hugo Fregonese	Gary Cooper, Anthony Quinn, Barbara Stanwyck, Ruth Roman	United States	
Bomba 9: Safari Drums	Ford Beebe	Johnny Sheffield	United States	
Botany Bay	John Farrow	Alan Ladd, James Mason, Patricia Medina, Cedric Hardwicke	United States	Sea adventure
O Cangaceiro	Lima Barreto	Alberto Ruschel, Marisa Prado, Milton Ribeiro, Vanja Orico	Brazil	
Captain John Smith and Pocahontas	Lew Landers	Anthony Dexter, Jody Lawrance	United States	Western, romantic adventure
Captain Phantom	Primo Zeglio	Frank Latimore, Maxwell Reed, Anna Maria Sandri	Italy	Sea adventure
Captain Scarface	Paul Guilfoyle	Barton MacLane, Leif Erickson	United States	
Captain Scarlett	Thomas Carr	Richard Greene, Leonora Amar	United States	
Cat-Women of the Moon	Arthur D. Hilton	Sonny Tufts, Victor Jory, Marie Windsor	United States	Space adventure
City Beneath the Sea	Budd Boetticher	Robert Ryan, Anthony Quinn	United States	Sea adventure
The Count of Monte Cristo	León Klimovsky	Jorge Mistral	Argentina	
Decameron Nights	Hugo Fregonese	Joan Fontaine, Louis Jourdan	United States; United Kingdom	
Desert Legion	Joseph Pevney	Alan Ladd, Richard Conte, Arlene Dahl, Akim Tamiroff	United States	
The Desert Song	H. Bruce Humberstone	Kathryn Grayson, Gordon MacRae, Steve Cochran, Raymond Massey	United States	Musical
Destination Gobi	Robert Wise	Richard Widmark	United States	War adventure
The Diamond Queen	John Brahm	Fernando Lamas, Arlene Dahl, Gilbert Roland	United States	
East of Sumatra	Budd Boetticher	Jeff Chandler, Anthony Quinn	United States	Sea adventure
Endless Horizons	Jean Dréville	Gisèle Pascal	France	
Fair Wind to Java	Joseph Kane	Fred MacMurray, Vera Ralston, Robert Douglas	United States	Sea adventure
Flame of Calcutta	Seymour Friedman	Denise Darcel, Patric Knowles	United States	
Flight to Tangier	Charles Marquis Warren	Joan Fontaine, Jack Palance, Corinne Calvet, Robert Douglas, Marcel Dalio	United States	
Forbidden	Rudolph Maté	Tony Curtis, Joanne Dru	United States	
Fort Algiers	Lesley Selander	Yvonne De Carlo, Carlos Thompson, Raymond Burr	United States	
Fort Ti	William Castle	George Montgomery	United States	Western
Die Geschichte vom kleinen Muck	Wolfgang Staudte	Thomas Schmidt	East Germany	Fantasy adventure
The Glorious Avenger	Vittorio Cottafavi	Armando Francioli, Yvette Lebon, Renée Saint-Cyr, Vittorio Sanipoli	Italy; France	
The Golden Blade	Nathan H. Juran	Rock Hudson, Piper Laurie	United States	
The Great Adventures of Captain Kidd	Derwin Abrahams, Charles S. Gould	Richard Crane, David Bruce, John Crawford, George Wallace	United States	Serial, pirate film
The Heart of the Matter	George More O'Ferrall	Trevor Howard, Elizabeth Allan, Maria Schell	United Kingdom	
Island in the Sky	William A. Wellman	John Wayne	United States	
Ivan, Son of the White Devil	Guido Brignone	Paul Campbell, Nadia Gray, Arnoldo Foà	Italy	
Jamaica Run	Lewis R. Foster	Ray Milland, Arlene Dahl, Wendell Corey, Patric Knowles	United States	Sea adventure
Jonny Saves Nebrador	Rudolf Jugert	Hans Albers, Margot Hielscher	West Germany	
Jungle Drums of Africa	Fred C. Brannon	Clayton Moore, Phyllis Coates, Roy Glenn, Don Blackman, John Cason	United States	Serial
Jungle Jim 10: Savage Mutiny	Spencer Gordon Bennet	Johnny Weissmuller	United States	
Jungle Jim 11: Valley of the Head Hunters	William Berke	Johnny Weissmuller	United States	
Jungle Jim 12: Killer Ape	Spencer Gordon Bennet	Johnny Weissmuller	United States	
King of the Khyber Rifles	Henry King	Tyrone Power, Michael Rennie, Terry Moore	United States	
Knights of the Round Table	Richard Thorpe	Ava Gardner, Robert Taylor, Mel Ferrer	United States; United Kingdom	Romantic adventure
Laughing Anne	Herbert Wilcox	Wendell Corey, Margaret Lockwood, Forrest Tucker, Ronald Shiner	United Kingdom	Sea adventure
Legione straniera	Basilio Franchina	Viviane Romance, Marc Lawrence, Alberto Farnese, Irène Galter, John Kitzmiller	Italy; France	
Little Fugitive	Morris Engel, Ray Ashley, Ruth Orkin	Ricky Brewster, Richie Andrusco, Winifred Cushing	United States	Adventure drama
Lovers of Toledo	Henri Decoin	Alida Valli, Pedro Armendáriz, Françoise Arnoul, Gérard Landry	France; Italy; Spain	
The Man from Cairo	Ray Enright	George Raft, Gianna Maria Canale, Massimo Serato, Irene Papas	United States; Italy	
The Master of Ballantrae	William Keighley	Errol Flynn, Roger Livesey, Anthony Steel, Beatrice Campbell, Yvonne Furneaux	United Kingdom	
Men Against the Sun	Brendan J. Stafford	John Bentley, Zena Marshall	United Kingdom	
The Mississippi Gambler	Rudolph Maté	Tyrone Power, Piper Laurie, Julie Adams	United States	
Mogambo	John Ford	Clark Gable, Ava Gardner, Grace Kelly	United States	
Our Girl Friday	Noel Langley	Joan Collins, Kenneth More	United Kingdom	Adventure comedy
The Pagans	Ferruccio Cerio	Pierre Cressoy, Hélène Rémy	Italy	
A Perilous Journey	R. G. Springsteen	Vera Ralston, David Brian, Scott Brady	United States	
Perils of the Jungle	George Blair	Clyde Beatty	United States	
Peter Pan	Clyde Geronimi, Wilfred Jackson, Hamilton Luske		United States	Animated film, fantasy adventure
I Piombi di Venezia	Gian Paolo Callegari	Massimo Serato, Armando Francioli	Italy	
Plunder of the Sun	John Farrow	Glenn Ford, Diana Lynn, Patricia Medina	United States	Adventure drama
Port Sinister	Harold Daniels	James Warren, Lynne Roberts, Paul Cavanagh	United States	
Prince of Pirates	Sidney Salkow	John Derek, Barbara Rush	United States	
Prisoner in the Tower of Fire	Giorgio Walter Chili	Milly Vitale, Rossano Brazzi	Italy	
Prisoners of the Casbah	Richard L. Bare	Gloria Grahame, Cesar Romero, Turhan Bey	United States	
Raiders of the Seven Seas	Sidney Salkow	John Payne, Donna Reed	United States	Pirate film
Return to Paradise	Mark Robson	Gary Cooper	United States	
Rob Roy, the Highland Rogue	Harold French	Richard Todd, Glynis Johns, James Robertson Justice	United States	
Rogue's March	Allan Davis	Peter Lawford, Richard Greene, Janice Rule	United States	
The Royal African Rifles	Lesley Selander	Louis Hayward	United States	
Saadia	Albert Lewin	Cornel Wilde, Mel Ferrer, Rita Gam, Michel Simon	United States	
Sadko	Alexander Ptushko	Sergei Stolyarov, Alla Larionova, Mikhail Troyanovsky	Soviet Union	
Sangaree	Edward Ludwig	Fernando Lamas, Arlene Dahl, Patricia Medina	United States	
Sea Devils	Raoul Walsh	Rock Hudson, Yvonne De Carlo	United States; United Kingdom	Sea adventure
The Ship of Condemned Women	Raffaello Matarazzo	May Britt, Kerima, Ettore Manni	Italy; France	Sea adventure
Sins of Rome	Riccardo Freda	Massimo Girotti, Ludmilla Tchérina, Gianna Maria Canale	Italy	
Siren of Bagdad	Richard Quine	Paul Henreid, Patricia Medina	United States	Fantasy adventure
Slaves of Babylon	William Castle	Richard Conte, Linda Christian	United States	
South of Algiers	Jack Lee	Van Heflin	United Kingdom	
The Steel Lady	E. A. Dupont	Rod Cameron, Tab Hunter	United States	
The Sword of Granada	Edward Dein, Carlos Véjar hijo	Cesar Romero, Katy Jurado	Mexico; United States	
Sword of Venus	Harold Daniels	Robert Clarke, Catherine McLeod, Dan O'Herlihy	United States	
Tangier Incident	Lew Landers	George Brent, Mari Aldon	United States	
Target Hong Kong	Fred F. Sears	Richard Denning	United States	
Tarzan and the She-Devil	Kurt Neumann	Lex Barker, Monique van Vooren, Raymond Burr	United States	
The Three Musketeers	André Hunebelle	Georges Marchal, Gino Cervi, Yvonne Sanson, Bourvil	France; Italy	
Thunder Bay	Anthony Mann	James Stewart, Joanne Dru, Gilbert Roland, Dan Duryea	United States	
The Treasure of Bengal	Gianni Vernuccio	Sabu, Luisella Boni	Italy; France	
Treasure of the Golden Condor	Delmer Daves	Cornel Wilde, Constance Smith	United States	
The Veils of Bagdad	George Sherman	Victor Mature	United States	
The Wages of Fear	Henri-Georges Clouzot	Yves Montand, Charles Vanel, Peter Van Eyck, Folco Lulli	France; Italy	Adventure drama
White Witch Doctor	Henry Hathaway	Robert Mitchum, Susan Hayward, Walter Slezak	United States	
Wings of the Hawk	Budd Boetticher	Van Heflin, Julie Adams	United States	Western

== 1954 ==
Title	Director	Cast	Country	Subgenre/Notes
20,000 Leagues Under the Sea	Richard Fleischer	Kirk Douglas, James Mason, Paul Lukas, Peter Lorre	United States	Sea adventure, science fiction adventure
The Adventures of Hajji Baba	Don Weis	John Derek, Elaine Stewart, Rosemarie Bowe	United States	Romantic adventure
Adventures of the Barber of Seville	Ladislao Vajda	Luis Mariano	Spain	Musical, adventure comedy
Africa Adventure	Robert Ruark	Robert Ruark	United States	Documentary
Alaska Seas	Jerry Hopper	Robert Ryan, Brian Keith, Jan Sterling, Gene Barry	United States	Arctic adventure
Ali Baba and the Forty Thieves	Jacques Becker	Fernandel, Dieter Borsche, Samia Gamal	France	Adventure comedy
Attila	Pietro Francisci	Anthony Quinn, Sophia Loren	Italy; France	
The Beachcomber	Muriel Box	Robert Newton, Glynis Johns, Donald Sinden	United Kingdom	Adventure comedy
Bengal Brigade	László Benedek	Rock Hudson, Arlene Dahl, Ursula Thiess, Dan O'Herlihy	United States	
The Black Knight	Tay Garnett	Alan Ladd, Patricia Medina, Peter Cushing	United Kingdom	
The Black Pirates	Allen H. Miner	Anthony Dexter, Martha Roth	United States	Pirate film
The Black Shield of Falworth	Rudolph Maté	Tony Curtis, Janet Leigh, David Farrar, Barbara Rush, Herbert Marshall, Dan O'Herlihy	United States	Romantic adventure
Bomba 10: Killer Leopard	Ford Beebe	Johnny Sheffield	United States	
Bomba 11: The Golden Idol	Ford Beebe	Johnny Sheffield	United States	
Cadet Rousselle	André Hunebelle	François Périer, Bourvil, Dany Robin	France	Adventure comedy
Cannibal Attack	Lee Sholem	Johnny Weissmuller	United States	
Captain Kidd and the Slave Girl	Lew Landers	Anthony Dexter, Eva Gabor	United States	Romantic adventure, pirate film
Charge of the Lancers	William Castle	Paulette Goddard, Jean-Pierre Aumont	United States	
Conchita and the Engineer	Franz Eichhorn, Hans Hinrich	Paul Hartmann, Vanja Orico, Robert Freitag	Brazil; West Germany	
The Count of Monte Cristo	Robert Vernay	Jean Marais	France; Italy	
Crossed Swords	Milton Krims	Errol Flynn, Gina Lollobrigida, Cesare Danova, Nadia Gray	Italy; United States	
Dangerous Mission	Louis King	Victor Mature, Piper Laurie, William Bendix, Vincent Price	United States	
Drums of Tahiti	William Castle	Dennis O'Keefe, Patricia Medina, Francis L. Sullivan	United States	
Duel in the Jungle	George Marshall	Dana Andrews, Jeanne Crain, David Farrar	United Kingdom	
Elephant Walk	William Dieterle	Elizabeth Taylor, Peter Finch, Dana Andrews	United States	
Fire Over Africa	Richard Sale	Maureen O'Hara, Macdonald Carey	United Kingdom	
Flesh and the Woman	Robert Siodmak	Jean-Claude Pascal, Gina Lollobrigida, Peter van Eyck, Arletty, Raymond Pellegrin	France; Italy	
Garden of Evil	Henry Hathaway	Gary Cooper, Richard Widmark, Susan Hayward, Cameron Mitchell	United States	Western
Golden Ivory	George Breakston	Robert Urquhart, John Bentley, Susan Stephen	United Kingdom	
The Golden Mistress	Abner Biberman	John Agar	United States	
The Great Warrior Skanderbeg	Sergei Yutkevich	Akaki Khorava	Soviet Union; Albania	
Green Fire	Andrew Marton	Stewart Granger, Grace Kelly	United States	
Hell Below Zero	Mark Robson	Alan Ladd	United Kingdom	Sea adventure, arctic adventure
His Majesty O'Keefe	Byron Haskin	Burt Lancaster	United States	Sea adventure
The Iron Glove	William Castle	Robert Stack, Ursula Thiess	United States	
The Island Princess	Paolo Moffa	Silvana Pampanini, Marcello Mastroianni, Gustavo Rojo	Italy; Spain	
Jivaro	Edward Ludwig	Fernando Lamas, Rhonda Fleming, Brian Keith	United States	
Jungle Jim 13: Jungle Man-Eaters	Lee Sholem	Johnny Weissmuller	United States	
Khyber Patrol	Seymour Friedman	Richard Egan, Dawn Addams, Patric Knowles, Raymond Burr	United States	
King of the Coral Sea	Lee Robinson	Chips Rafferty, Charles Tingwell	Australia	Sea adventure
King Richard and the Crusaders	David Butler	Rex Harrison, Virginia Mayo, George Sanders, Laurence Harvey, Robert Douglas	United States	
The King's Prisoner	Giorgio Venturini, Richard Pottier	Andrée Debar, Pierre Cressoy	Italy; France	
Kongeligt besøg	Erik Balling	Grethe Thordahl, Kai Holm, Bjørn Watt-Boolsen	Denmark	
Long John Silver	Byron Haskin	Robert Newton	Australia	Family-oriented adventure, pirate film
Malaga	Richard Sale	Maureen O'Hara, Macdonald Carey	United Kingdom; United States	
The Men of Sherwood Forest	Val Guest	Don Taylor	United Kingdom	
Miss Robin Crusoe	Eugene Frenke	Amanda Blake, Rosalind Hayes, George Nader	United States	
I misteri della giungla nera	Ralph Murphy, Gian Paolo Callegari	Lex Barker, Fiorella Mari, Paul Muller	Italy; United States	
La moza de cántaro	Florián Rey	Paquita Rico	Spain	Adventure comedy
Naked Amazon	Zygmunt Sulistrowski	Zygmunt Sulistrowski	Brazil	
The Naked Jungle	Byron Haskin	Charlton Heston, Eleanor Parker, Abraham Sofaer	United States	Adventure drama
La Patrouille des sables	René Chanas	Michel Auclair, Emma Penella, Marcel Dalio	France; Spain	
La prigioniera di Amalfi	Giorgio Cristallini	Luciana Vedovelli, Piero Lulli, Narciso Parigi, Marisa Merlini, Paul Muller	Italy	
Prince Valiant	Henry Hathaway	Robert Wagner, Janet Leigh, James Mason, Debra Paget, Sterling Hayden, Victor McLaglen	United States	
La rebelión de los colgados	Alfredo B. Crevenna	Pedro Armendáriz	Mexico	Adventure drama
Return to Treasure Island	E. A. Dupont	Tab Hunter, Dawn Addams	United States	Sea adventure
Les Révoltés de Lomanach	Richard Pottier	Dany Robin, Amedeo Nazzari	France; Italy	
Robinson Crusoe	Luis Buñuel	Dan O'Herlihy, Jaime Fernández	Mexico; United States	
Sabaka	Frank Ferrin	Nino Marcel, Boris Karloff	United States	
The Saracen Blade	William Castle	Ricardo Montalbán	United States	
The Scarlet Spear	George Breakston	John Bentley, Martha Hyer	United Kingdom	
Secret of the Incas	Jerry Hopper	Charlton Heston, Yma Sumac, Robert Young	United States	
Serpent Island	Tom Gries	Sonny Tufts	United States	
Sign of the Pagan	Douglas Sirk	Jack Palance, Jeff Chandler	United States	
The Snow Creature	W. Lee Wilder	Paul Langton	United States	
La Soupe à la grimace	Jean Sacha	Georges Marchal, Maria Mauban, Dominique Wilms	France	
Star of India	Arthur Lubin	Cornel Wilde, Jean Wallace, Herbert Lom	United Kingdom	
Tam tam nell'oltre Giuba	Carlo Sandri	Sandra Silvani, Bruno Tomei, Salvatore Cuffaro	Italy	
Tanganyika	Andre DeToth	Van Heflin, Ruth Roman	United States	
They Were So Young	Kurt Neumann	Scott Brady, Raymond Burr, Johanna Matz	United States; West Germany	
Track of the Cat	William A. Wellman	Robert Mitchum, Teresa Wright, Tab Hunter	United States	
Trader Tom of the China Seas	Franklin Adreon	Harry Lauter, Aline Towne, Lyle Talbot, Robert Shayne, Fred Graham	United States	Serial, sea adventure
Ulysses	Mario Camerini	Kirk Douglas, Silvana Mangano, Anthony Quinn, Rossana Podestà	Italy	Fantasy adventure, sea adventure
Untouched	Roberto Gavaldón	Ricardo Montalbán, Ariadna Welter	Mexico	
Valley of the Kings	Robert Pirosh	Robert Taylor, Eleanor Parker, Carlos Thompson	United States	
La vendetta dei Tughs	Ralph Murphy, Gian Paolo Callegari	Lex Barker, Fiorella Mari, Paul Muller	Italy; United States	
Vera Cruz	Robert Aldrich	Gary Cooper, Burt Lancaster	United States	Western
Le Vicomte de Bragelonne	Fernando Cerchio	Georges Marchal, Dawn Addams, Jacques Dumesnil	Italy; France	
West of Zanzibar	Harry Watt	Anthony Steel	United Kingdom	
The White Orchid	Reginald LeBorg	William Lundigan, Peggie Castle, Armando Silvestre	United States	
World for Ransom	Robert Aldrich	Dan Duryea, Gene Lockhart, Patric Knowles, Marian Carr	United States	
Yankee Pasha	Joseph Pevney	Jeff Chandler, Rhonda Fleming, Mamie Van Doren, Lee J. Cobb	United States	

== 1955 ==
Title	Director	Cast	Country	Subgenre/Notes
Abbott and Costello Meet the Mummy	Charles Lamont	Bud Abbott, Lou Costello	United States	Adventure comedy
The Adventures of Captain Africa	Spencer Gordon Bennet	John Hart	United States	Serial
The Adventures of Quentin Durward	Richard Thorpe	Robert Taylor, Kay Kendall, Robert Morley	United States; United Kingdom	
African Manhunt	Seymour Friedman	Myron Healey, Karin Booth, John Kellogg	United States	
The Americano	William Castle	Glenn Ford, Cesar Romero, Ursula Thiess	United States	Western
Bengazi	John Brahm	Richard Conte, Victor McLaglen, Richard Carlson, Mala Powers	United States	
Blood Alley	William A. Wellman	John Wayne, Lauren Bacall	United States	
Bomba 12: Lord of the Jungle	Ford Beebe	Johnny Sheffield	United States	
Captain Lightfoot	Douglas Sirk	Rock Hudson, Barbara Rush, Jeff Morrow	United States	Romantic adventure
Caroline and the Rebels	Jean Devaivre	Jean-Claude Pascal, Sophie Desmarets, Brigitte Bardot, Magali Noël	France	Romantic adventure
Cartouche	Steve Sekely	Richard Basehart, Patricia Roc, Massimo Serato, Akim Tamiroff	Italy	
Chéri-Bibi	Marcello Pagliero	Jean Richard	Italy; France	
Contraband Spain	Lawrence Huntington	Richard Greene, Anouk Aimée	United Kingdom; Spain	
The Corsican Brothers	Leo Fleider	António Vilar	Argentina	
The Coyote	Joaquín Luis Romero Marchent, Fernando Soler	Abel Salazar	Spain; Mexico	Western
Cross Channel	R. G. Springsteen	Wayne Morris, Yvonne Furneaux	United States	Sea adventure
The Dark Avenger	Henry Levin	Errol Flynn, Joanne Dru, Peter Finch, Yvonne Furneaux	United Kingdom; United States	
Desert Sands	Lesley Selander	Ralph Meeker, Marla English, J. Carrol Naish, John Carradine	United States	
Devil Goddess	Spencer Gordon Bennet	Johnny Weissmuller	United States	
Duel on the Mississippi	William Castle	Lex Barker, Patricia Medina	United States	
Escape to Burma	Allan Dwan	Barbara Stanwyck, Robert Ryan, David Farrar	United States	
The Far Horizons	Rudolph Maté	Fred MacMurray, Charlton Heston, Donna Reed, Barbara Hale	United States	Western
Fortune carrée	Bernard Borderie	Pedro Armendáriz, Folco Lulli	France; Italy	
Hell's Island	Phil Karlson	John Payne, Mary Murphy	United States	
Heroes and Sinners	Yves Ciampi	Yves Montand, Curd Jürgens, María Félix, Jean Servais, Gert Fröbe	France	
Les Hussards	Alex Joffé	Bernard Blier, Bourvil, Giovanna Ralli, Louis de Funès	France	Adventure comedy
Jungle Hell	Norman A. Cerf	Sabu	United States	
Jungle Moon Men	Charles S. Gould	Johnny Weissmuller	United States	
El Juramento de Lagardere	León Klimovsky	Carlos Cores, Elsa Daniel	Argentina	
The Kentuckian	Burt Lancaster	Burt Lancaster, Dianne Foster, Diana Lynn, Walter Matthau	United States	Western
King Dinosaur	Bert I. Gordon	William Bryant, Wanda Curtis, Douglas Henderson	United States	Space adventure
The King's Thief	Robert Z. Leonard	Edmund Purdom, Roger Moore, David Niven, Ann Blyth, George Sanders	United States	
Kismet	Vincente Minnelli	Howard Keel, Ann Blyth, Dolores Gray, Vic Damone	United States	Musical, romantic adventure
Kiss of Fire	Joseph M. Newman	Jack Palance, Barbara Rush, Martha Hyer	United States	
Lady Godiva of Coventry	Arthur Lubin	Maureen O'Hara, George Nader, Victor McLaglen	United States	
The Left Hand of God	Edward Dmytryk	Humphrey Bogart, Gene Tierney, Lee J. Cobb	United States	
The Looters	Abner Biberman	Rory Calhoun, Julie Adams, Ray Danton	United States	
Many Rivers to Cross	Roy Rowland	Robert Taylor, Eleanor Parker, Victor McLaglen, Russ Tamblyn	United States	Western
Moana, Virgin of the Amazon	Elia Marcelli	Lua Manoa, Germano Longo, Luisa Rivelli	Italy	
Moonfleet	Fritz Lang	Stewart Granger, George Sanders, Joan Greenwood	United States	
Mr. Arkadin	Orson Welles	Orson Welles, Robert Arden, Patricia Medina, Paola Mori, Akim Tamiroff, Grégoire Aslan, Mischa Auer, Michael Redgrave, Suzanne Flon, Katina Paxinou, Peter van Eyck	France; Spain; Switzerland	
Nagana	Hervé Bromberger	Barbara Laage, Renato Baldini	France; Italy	
Oasis	Yves Allégret	Michèle Morgan, Cornell Borchers, Pierre Brasseur	France; West Germany	
Panther Girl of the Kongo	Franklin Adreon	Phyllis Coates, Myron Healey	United States	Serial
Passage Home	Roy Ward Baker	Peter Finch, Anthony Steel, Diane Cilento	United Kingdom	Sea adventure
Pearl of the South Pacific	Allan Dwan	Virginia Mayo, Dennis Morgan, David Farrar	United States	Sea adventure
Pirates of Tripoli	Felix E. Feist	Paul Henreid, Patricia Medina	United States	
Il principe della maschera rossa	Leopoldo Savona	Frank Latimore, Maria Fiore, Yvonne Furneaux	Italy	
A Prize of Gold	Mark Robson	Richard Widmark, Mai Zetterling	United Kingdom	
The Purple Mask	H. Bruce Humberstone	Tony Curtis, Colleen Miller, Angela Lansbury, Dan O'Herlihy	United States	
The Red Cloak	Giuseppe Maria Scotese	Patricia Medina, Fausto Tozzi, Bruce Cabot, Jean Murat	Italy; France	
Rommel's Treasure	Romolo Marcellini	Dawn Addams, Paul Hubschmid, Isa Miranda, Bruce Cabot	Italy	
The Sea Chase	John Farrow	John Wayne, Lana Turner, David Farrar	United States	War adventure, sea adventure
Seven Cities of Gold	Robert D. Webb	Anthony Quinn, Richard Egan, Michael Rennie, Jeffrey Hunter, Rita Moreno	United States	
Simba	Brian Desmond Hurst	Dirk Bogarde, Donald Sinden, Virginia McKenna	United Kingdom	
Sins of Casanova	Steno	Gabriele Ferzetti, Corinne Calvet, Irène Galter, Nadia Gray, Mara Lane, Marina Vlady	Italy	Adventure comedy
Soldier of Fortune	Edward Dmytryk	Clark Gable, Susan Hayward, Michael Rennie	United States	
Son of Sinbad	Ted Tetzlaff	Dale Robertson, Vincent Price, Sally Forrest, Lili St. Cyr, Mari Blanchard	United States	
The Spoilers	Jesse Hibbs	Anne Baxter, Jeff Chandler, Rory Calhoun, Ray Danton	United States	Western
Storm Over the Nile	Terence Young, Zoltan Korda	Anthony Steel, Laurence Harvey, James Robertson Justice, Mary Ure	United Kingdom	
Tangier Assignment	César Fernández Ardavín, Ted Leversuch	Fernando Rey, June Powell	Spain; United Kingdom	
Tarzan's Hidden Jungle	Harold D. Schuster	Gordon Scott, Vera Miles, Peter van Eyck, Jack Elam	United States	
That Lady	Terence Young	Olivia de Havilland, Gilbert Roland, Paul Scofield, Françoise Rosay, Dennis Price	United Kingdom; Spain	Romantic adventure
Timberjack	Joseph Kane	Sterling Hayden, Vera Ralston, David Brian, Adolphe Menjou	United States	
Top of the World	Lewis R. Foster	Dale Robertson, Evelyn Keyes, Frank Lovejoy	United States	Arctic adventure
Tower of Lust	Abel Gance	Pierre Brasseur, Silvana Pampanini, Paul Guers	France; Italy	
The Treasure of Pancho Villa	George Sherman	Rory Calhoun, Shelley Winters, Gilbert Roland	United States	Western
Underwater!	John Sturges	Jane Russell, Richard Egan, Gilbert Roland	United States	Sea adventure
The Virgin Queen	Henry Koster	Bette Davis, Richard Todd, Joan Collins, Herbert Marshall, Dan O'Herlihy, Robert Douglas	United States	
Yellowneck	R. John Hugh	Lin McCarthy, Stephen Courtleigh, Berry Kroeger, Harold Gordon, Bill Mason	United States	

== 1956 ==
Title	Director	Cast	Country	Subgenre/Notes
Alexander the Great	Robert Rossen	Richard Burton, Fredric March, Claire Bloom, Danielle Darrieux	United States; Spain	
Around the World in Eighty Days	Michael Anderson	David Niven, Cantinflas, Robert Newton, Shirley MacLaine	United States; United Kingdom	Romantic adventure, adventure comedy
Les Aventures de Till L'Espiègle	Gérard Philipe, Joris Ivens	Gérard Philipe, Jean Vilar, Nicole Berger, Jean Carmet, Erwin Geschonneck	France; East Germany	
Back from Eternity	John Farrow	Robert Ryan, Anita Ekberg, Rod Steiger	United States	Adventure drama
Bandido	Richard Fleischer	Robert Mitchum, Gilbert Roland	United States	Western
Bermuda Affair	A. Edward Sutherland	Kim Hunter, Gary Merrill, Ron Randell, Zena Marshall	United Kingdom	Romantic adventure
Beyond Mombasa	George Marshall	Cornel Wilde, Donna Reed, Leo Genn	United States	
Bhowani Junction	George Cukor	Ava Gardner, Stewart Granger	United States; United Kingdom	Romantic adventure
The Black Tent	Brian Desmond Hurst	Anthony Steel, Donald Sinden, Anna Maria Sandri	United Kingdom	
Carib Gold	Harold Young	Coley Wallace, Ethel Waters, Geoffrey Holder	United States	Sea adventure
Congo Crossing	Joseph Pevney	George Nader, Virginia Mayo, Peter Lorre	United States	Adventure drama
The Conqueror	Dick Powell	John Wayne, Susan Hayward, Agnes Moorehead, Pedro Armendáriz	United States	
The Court Jester	Melvin Frank, Norman Panama	Danny Kaye, Glynis Johns, Basil Rathbone	United States	Adventure comedy
Curucu, Beast of the Amazon	Curt Siodmak	John Bromfield, Beverly Garland	United States	Horror adventure
Dark Venture	John Calvert	John Calvert, Ann Cornell, John Carradine	United States	
Davy Crockett and the River Pirates	Norman Foster	Fess Parker, Buddy Ebsen, Jeff York, Kenneth Tobey, Clem Bevans	United States	Western
Death in the Garden	Luis Buñuel	Simone Signoret, Charles Vanel, Georges Marchal, Michel Piccoli	France; Mexico	Adventure drama
Diane	David Miller	Lana Turner, Roger Moore, Pedro Armendáriz, Marisa Pavan, Cedric Hardwicke	United States	Romantic adventure
Don Juan	John Berry	Fernandel, Carmen Sevilla, Fernando Rey	France	Adventure comedy
Escape in the Sun	George Breakston	John Bentley, Vera Fusek	United Kingdom	
Flame of the Islands	Edward Ludwig	Yvonne De Carlo, Howard Duff, Zachary Scott, James Arness	United States	
Flight to Hong Kong	Joseph M. Newman	Rory Calhoun, Barbara Rush	United States	
Forbidden Planet	Fred Wilcox	Walter Pidgeon, Anne Francis, Leslie Nielsen	United States	Space adventure
Gorilla	Lorens Marmstedt, Sven Nykvist, Lars-Henrik Ottoson	Georges Galley, Gio Petré	Sweden	
The Great Locomotive Chase	Francis D. Lyon	Fess Parker, Jeffrey Hunter, Jeff York	United States	Western
Helen of Troy	Robert Wise	Rossana Podestà, Jacques Sernas, Cedric Hardwicke, Stanley Baker, Robert Douglas, Torin Thatcher	United States; Italy; France	
Huk!	John Barnwell	George Montgomery, Mona Freeman	United States	
Ilya Muromets	Aleksandr Ptushko	Boris Andreyev, Andrei Abrikosov, Natalya Medvedeva	Soviet Union	Fantasy adventure
Jaguar	George Blair	Sabu	United States	
The Knight of the Black Sword	László Kish, Luigi Capuano	Marina Berti, Steve Barclay	Italy	
The Lebanese Mission	Richard Pottier	Jean-Claude Pascal, Gianna Maria Canale, Omar Sharif, Jean Servais, Juliette Gréco	France	
Liane, Jungle Goddess	Eduard von Borsody	Marion Michael, Hardy Krüger, Reggie Nalder	West Germany	
Lisbon	Ray Milland	Ray Milland, Maureen O'Hara, Claude Rains	United States	Sea adventure
Magnificent Roughnecks	Sherman A. Rose	Jack Carson, Mickey Rooney	United States	
Man Beast	Jerry Warren	Rock Madison, Virginia Maynor	United States	Horror adventure, mountaineering adventure
Manfish	W. Lee Wilder	John Bromfield, Lon Chaney Jr., Victor Jory	United States	Sea adventure
Michel Strogoff	Carmine Gallone	Curd Jürgens, Geneviève Page, Sylva Koscina	Italy; France	
Moby Dick	John Huston	Gregory Peck, Richard Basehart, Leo Genn, Orson Welles	United States	Sea adventure
The Mole People	Virgil W. Vogel	John Agar	United States	Horror adventure, science fiction adventure
The Mountain	Edward Dmytryk	Spencer Tracy, Robert Wagner, Claire Trevor	United States	Mountaineering adventure
Odongo	John Gilling	Rhonda Fleming, Macdonald Carey	United Kingdom	
On the Threshold of Space	Robert D. Webb	Guy Madison, Virginia Leith, John Hodiak, Dean Jagger, Ken Clark	United States	
Port Afrique	Rudolph Maté	Pier Angeli, Philip Carey, Dennis Price	United Kingdom	
Roland the Mighty	Pietro Francisci	Rik Battaglia, Rosanna Schiaffino	Italy	
Run for the Sun	Roy Boulting	Richard Widmark, Jane Greer, Trevor Howard, Peter van Eyck	United States	
Safari	Terence Young	Victor Mature, Janet Leigh	United Kingdom	
Santiago	Gordon Douglas	Alan Ladd, Rossana Podestà	United States	
Secret of Treasure Mountain	Seymour Friedman	Valerie French, Raymond Burr, William Prince, Lance Fuller	United States	Western
Lo spadaccino misterioso	Sergio Grieco	Frank Latimore, Fiorella Mari, Gérard Landry, Tamara Lees	Italy	
Swamp Women	Roger Corman	Marie Windsor, Carole Mathews, Beverly Garland, Mike Connors	United States	
The Violent Patriot	Sergio Grieco	Vittorio Gassman, Constance Smith, Anna Maria Ferrero, Gérard Landry	Italy	
Walk into Paradise	Lee Robinson, Marcello Pagliero	Chips Rafferty, Françoise Christophe, Reg Lye, Pierre Cressoy	Australia; France	
Wetbacks	Hank McCune	Lloyd Bridges, Nancy Gates	United States	Sea adventure
The Women of Pitcairn Island	Jean Yarbrough	Lynn Bari, James Craig, John Smith, Arleen Whelan	United States	Sea adventure

== 1957 ==
Title	Director	Cast	Country	Subgenre/Notes
The Abominable Snowman	Val Guest	Peter Cushing, Forrest Tucker	United Kingdom	
Action of the Tiger	Terence Young	Van Johnson, Martine Carol, Herbert Lom, Gustavo Rojo, Sean Connery	United Kingdom; United States	Sea adventure
The Admirable Crichton	Lewis Gilbert	Kenneth More, Diane Cilento, Cecil Parker, Sally Ann Howes	United Kingdom	Adventure comedy, sea adventure
Barnacle Bill	Charles Frend	Alec Guinness, Irene Browne, Maurice Denham	United Kingdom	
The Black Devil	Sergio Grieco	Gérard Landry, Milly Vitale, Nadia Gray	Italy	
Blaue Jungs	Wolfgang Schleif	Karlheinz Böhm, Claus Biederstaedt, Walter Giller	West Germany	Sea adventure, romantic adventure
Boy on a Dolphin	Jean Negulesco	Alan Ladd, Sophia Loren, Clifton Webb, Jorge Mistral	United States	Sea adventure
The Bridge on the River Kwai	David Lean	Alec Guinness, Sessue Hayakawa, William Holden, Jack Hawkins	United Kingdom; United States	War adventure
Campbell's Kingdom	Ralph Thomas	Dirk Bogarde, Stanley Baker, Michael Craig, Barbara Murray	United Kingdom	
Cape Horn	Tito Davison	Jorge Mistral, Silvia Pinal	Mexico	Sea adventure
Ces dames préfèrent le mambo	Bernard Borderie	Eddie Constantine, Lino Ventura, Pascale Roberts, Jean Murat	France; Italy	Sea adventure
China Gate	Samuel Fuller	Gene Barry, Angie Dickinson, Nat King Cole, Lee Van Cleef	United States	War adventure
Dangerous Exile	Brian Desmond Hurst	Louis Jourdan, Belinda Lee, Keith Michell	United Kingdom	
The Deerslayer	Kurt Neumann	Lex Barker, Rita Moreno, Forrest Tucker	United States	Western
Desert Warrior	Fernando Cerchio, León Klimovsky, Goffredo Alessandrini, Gianni Vernuccio	Ricardo Montalbán, Carmen Sevilla, Gino Cervi	Italy; Spain	
Don Quixote	Grigori Kozintsev	Nikolay Cherkasov, Yuri Tolubeyev	Soviet Union	
The Dragon's Blood	Giacomo Gentilomo	Sebastian Fischer, Katharina Mayberg, Ilaria Occhini	Italy	Fantasy adventure
East of Kilimanjaro	Arnold Belgard, Edoardo Capolino	Marshall Thompson, Fausto Tozzi, Gaby André	Italy; United States; United Kingdom	
Emperor Meiji and the Great Russo-Japanese War	Kunio Watanabe	Kanjûrô Arashi	Japan	
Fire Down Below	Robert Parrish	Rita Hayworth, Robert Mitchum, Jack Lemmon, Herbert Lom	United States; United Kingdom	Sea adventure
Flucht in die Tropennacht	Paul May	Bernhard Wicki, Claus Holm, Erica Beer	West Germany	
Ghost Diver	Richard Einfeld, Merrill G. White	James Craig, Audrey Totter	United States	Sea adventure
Heaven Knows, Mr. Allison	John Huston	Robert Mitchum, Deborah Kerr	United States	War adventure
Hell Ship Mutiny	Lee Sholem, Elmo Williams	Jon Hall, John Carradine, Peter Lorre	United States	Sea adventure
The Incredible Petrified World	Jerry Warren	John Carradine, Robert Clarke, Phyllis Coates	United States	Sea adventure, science fiction adventure
Istanbul	Joseph Pevney	Errol Flynn, Cornell Borchers	United States	
Jet Pilot	Josef von Sternberg	John Wayne, Janet Leigh	United States	
Jungle Heat	Howard W. Koch	Lex Barker, Mari Blanchard, James Westerfield	United States	
The Land Unknown	Virgil W. Vogel	Jock Mahoney, Shirley Patterson	United States	Fantasy adventure
Legend of the Lost	Henry Hathaway	John Wayne, Sophia Loren, Rossano Brazzi	Italy; United States; Panama	Adventure drama
The Living Idol	Albert Lewin	Liliane Montevecchi, James Robertson Justice, Steve Forrest	United States	
Love Slaves of the Amazons	Curt Siodmak	Don Taylor, Gianna Segale	United States	
Manuela	Guy Hamilton	Trevor Howard, Elsa Martinelli, Pedro Armendáriz, Donald Pleasence	United Kingdom	Sea adventure, romantic adventure
Miles of Fire	Samson Samsonov	Igor Savkin, Margarita Volodina, Mikhail Troyanovsky, Vladimir Kenigson	Soviet Union	War adventure
Monster from Green Hell	Kenneth G. Crane	Jim Davis, Robert Griffin, Barbara Turner	United States	Horror adventure
The Mysteries of Paris	Fernando Cerchio	Frank Villard, Yvette Lebon, Jacques Castelot, Lorella De Luca, John Kitzmiller	Italy; France	
Nature Girl and the Slaver	Hermann Leitner	Marion Michael, Adrian Hoven, Rik Battaglia	West Germany; Italy	
The New World	René Cardona	Lorena Velázquez, René Cardona Jr.	Mexico	Sea adventure
Omar Khayyam	William Dieterle	Cornel Wilde, Michael Rennie, Debra Paget, John Derek, Raymond Massey	United States	
The One That Got Away	Roy Ward Baker	Hardy Krüger	United Kingdom	War adventure
Pharaoh's Curse	Lee Sholem	Mark Dana, Ziva Rodann	United States	Horror adventure
Pirate of the Half Moon	Giuseppe Maria Scotese	John Derek, Gianna Maria Canale, Ingeborg Schöner	Italy	
The Pride and the Passion	Stanley Kramer	Cary Grant, Frank Sinatra, Sophia Loren	United States	
Robbery Under Arms	Jack Lee	Peter Finch, Ronald Lewis, Maureen Swanson, David McCallum, Jill Ireland	United Kingdom	
S.O.S. Noronha	Georges Rouquier	Jean Marais, Vanja Orico, José Lewgoy	France	
Sabu and the Magic Ring	George Blair	Sabu	United States	
The Saga of the Viking Women and Their Voyage to the Waters of the Great Sea Serpent	Roger Corman	Abby Dalton, Susan Cabot, Brad Jackson, June Kenney, Richard Devon	United States	Sea adventure, fantasy adventure
Sail Into Danger	Kenneth Hume	Dennis O'Keefe, Kathleen Ryan	United Kingdom; Spain	Sea adventure
Something of Value	Richard Brooks	Rock Hudson, Sidney Poitier, Dana Wynter, Wendy Hiller	United States	
The Spirit of St. Louis	Billy Wilder	James Stewart	United States	
Tarzan and the Lost Safari	H. Bruce Humberstone	Gordon Scott	United States	
Three and a Half Musketeers	Gilberto Martínez Solares	Germán Valdés	Mexico	Adventure comedy
Tip on a Dead Jockey	Richard Thorpe	Robert Taylor, Dorothy Malone, Marcel Dalio	United States	
Undersea Girl	John Peyser	Mara Corday, Pat Conway	United States	Sea adventure
Voodoo Island	Reginald LeBorg	Boris Karloff	United States	Horror adventure
Voodoo Woman	Edward L. Cahn	Marla English, Tom Conway, Mike Connors	United States	Horror adventure
Woman and the Hunter	George Breakston	Ann Sheridan, David Farrar	United States	
Zarak	Terence Young	Victor Mature, Anita Ekberg, Michael Wilding	United Kingdom	
Zombies of Mora Tau	Edward L. Cahn	Gregg Palmer, Allison Hayes	United States	Sea adventure

== 1958 ==
Title	Director	Cast	Country	Subgenre/Notes
The 7th Voyage of Sinbad	Nathan H. Juran	Kerwin Mathews, Kathryn Grant, Richard Eyer, Torin Thatcher	United States	Fantasy adventure, sea adventure
The Amorous Corporal	Robert Darène	François Périer, Rossana Podestà, Robert Hirsch	France	Adventure comedy
Les Aventuriers du Mékong	Jean Bastia	Dominique Wilms, Jean Gaven, Jean-Pierre Kérien, Reinhard Kolldehoff	France	
The Buccaneer	Anthony Quinn	Yul Brynner, Claire Bloom, Charles Boyer, Charlton Heston	United States	Pirate film
Captain Falcon	Carlo Campogalliani	Lex Barker, Rossana Rory, Massimo Serato, Anna Maria Ferrero, Paul Muller	Italy; France	
Il Conte di Matera	Luigi Capuano	Virna Lisi, Otello Toso, Paul Muller, Giacomo Rossi Stuart	Italy	
The Decks Ran Red	Andrew L. Stone	James Mason, Dorothy Dandridge, Broderick Crawford	United States	Sea adventure
Desert Hell	Charles Marquis Warren	Brian Keith, Barbara Hale	United States	
Diamond Safari	Gerald Mayer	Kevin McCarthy, André Morell	United States; South Africa	
Enchanted Island	Allan Dwan	Dana Andrews, Jane Powell, Ted de Corsia	United States	Sea adventure
Escape from Sahara	Wolfgang Staudte	Hildegard Knef, Bernhard Wicki, Hannes Messemer, Joachim Hansen	West Germany	
The Fabulous World of Jules Verne	Karel Zeman	Lubor Tokoš, Arnost Navrátil, Miroslav Holub	Czechoslovakia	Science fiction adventure
La Fille de feu	Alfred Rode	Claudine Dupuis, Erno Crisa, Raymond Souplex, Armand Mestral, William Marshall, Yoko Tani	France	
From the Earth to the Moon	Byron Haskin	Joseph Cotten, George Sanders, Debra Paget	United States	Space adventure
Ghost of the China Sea	Fred F. Sears	David Brian	United States	War adventure, sea adventure
The Gun Runners	Don Siegel	Audie Murphy	United States	Sea adventure
Harry Black	Hugo Fregonese	Stewart Granger, Barbara Rush, Anthony Steel	United Kingdom	
Hercules	Pietro Francisci	Steve Reeves, Sylva Koscina, Gianna Maria Canale	Italy; Spain	
The Hidden Fortress	Akira Kurosawa	Toshirō Mifune, Misa Uehara, Kamatari Fujiwara	Japan	
High Hell	Burt Balaban	John Derek, Elaine Stewart, Patrick Allen	United Kingdom	
Un homme se penche sur son passé	Willy Rozier	Jacques Bergerac, Barbara Rütting	France	
Ice Cold in Alex	J. Lee Thompson	John Mills, Sylvia Syms, Anthony Quayle, Harry Andrews	United Kingdom	War adventure
Island Women	William Berke	Marie Windsor, Vince Edwards	United States	Sea adventure, romantic adventure
It! The Terror from Beyond Space	Edward L. Cahn	Marshall Thompson, Shirley Patterson, Kim Spalding	United States	Space adventure
La Tour, prends garde!	Georges Lampin	Jean Marais, Eleonora Rossi Drago, Nadja Tiller	France; Italy; Yugoslavia	
Legion of the Doomed	Thor L. Brooks	Bill Williams	United States	
Manhunt in the Jungle	Tom McGowan	Robin Hughes	United States	
Maracaibo	Cornel Wilde	Cornel Wilde, Jean Wallace	United States	
Me and the Colonel	Peter Glenville	Danny Kaye, Curd Jürgens, Nicole Maurey, Françoise Rosay, Akim Tamiroff	United States	War adventure, adventure comedy
The Mighty Crusaders	Carlo Ludovico Bragaglia	Francisco Rabal, Sylva Koscina, Gianna Maria Canale, Rik Battaglia	Italy	
Missile to the Moon	Richard E. Cunha	Nina Bara, Gary Clarke, Tommy Cook	United States	Space adventure
The Moonraker	David MacDonald	George Baker, Sylvia Syms, Marius Goring, Gary Raymond	United Kingdom	
The Naked Earth	Vincent Sherman	Richard Todd, Juliette Gréco, John Kitzmiller	United Kingdom	
Nor the Moon by Night	Ken Annakin	Belinda Lee, Michael Craig, Patrick McGoohan	United Kingdom	
The Old Man and the Sea	John Sturges	Spencer Tracy	United States	Adventure drama, sea adventure
La Passe du diable	Pierre Schoendoerffer, Jacques Dupont		France	Docudrama
Peter Voss, Thief of Millions	Wolfgang Becker	O.W. Fischer, Ingrid Andree, Walter Giller	West Germany	Adventure comedy
Pia de' Tolomei	Sergio Grieco	Jacques Sernas, Bella Darvi	Italy; France	
Pirate of the Black Hawk	Sergio Grieco	Gérard Landry, Mijanou Bardot, Ettore Manni	Italy; France	Pirate film
Queen of Outer Space	Edward Bernds	Zsa Zsa Gabor, Eric Fleming, Laurie Mitchell	United States	Space adventure
Raw Wind in Eden	Richard Wilson	Esther Williams, Jeff Chandler, Rossana Podestà, Carlos Thompson, Rik Battaglia, Eduardo De Filippo	United States	Romantic adventure, sea adventure
Romarei, das Mädchen mit den grünen Augen	Harald Reinl	Carola von Kayser, Joachim Hansen, Reggie Nalder	West Germany	
The Roots of Heaven	John Huston	Errol Flynn, Juliette Gréco, Trevor Howard, Eddie Albert, Orson Welles	United States	
Der Schinderhannes	Helmut Käutner	Curd Jürgens, Maria Schell	West Germany	
Sea Fury	Cy Endfield	Stanley Baker, Victor McLaglen, Luciana Paluzzi	United Kingdom	Sea adventure
Sea of Sand	Guy Green	Michael Craig, John Gregson, Richard Attenborough	United Kingdom	War adventure
She Gods of Shark Reef	Roger Corman	Bill Cord, Don Durant, Lisa Montell	United States	Sea adventure
Die Sklavenkarawane	Georg Marischka, Ramón Torrado	Viktor Staal, Georg Thomalla, Theo Lingen, Fernando Sancho	West Germany; Spain	
The Son of Robin Hood	George Sherman	Al Hedison, June Laverick, David Farrar, Marius Goring, Philip Friend	United States; United Kingdom	
The Spessart Inn	Kurt Hoffmann	Liselotte Pulver, Carlos Thompson	West Germany	Adventure comedy
The Stowaway	Ralph Habib, Lee Robinson	Martine Carol, Karlheinz Böhm, Serge Reggiani, Arletty, Roger Livesey	France; Australia	Sea adventure
Street of Darkness	Robert G. Walker	Robert Keys, John Close	United States	
Tarzan's Fight for Life	H. Bruce Humberstone	Gordon Scott	United States	
Tempest	Alberto Lattuada	Van Heflin, Viveca Lindfors, Silvana Mangano, Geoffrey Horne, Vittorio Gassman, Agnes Moorehead, Oskar Homolka	Italy; France; Yugoslavia	Romantic adventure
Ten Days to Tulara	George Sherman	Sterling Hayden	United States	
Thunder Road	Arthur Ripley	Robert Mitchum, Gene Barry	United States	
Twilight for the Gods	Joseph Pevney	Rock Hudson, Cyd Charisse, Arthur Kennedy	United States	Sea adventure
The Vikings	Richard Fleischer	Kirk Douglas, Tony Curtis, Ernest Borgnine, Janet Leigh	United States	Sea adventure
Villa!!	James B. Clark	Brian Keith, Cesar Romero, Margia Dean, Rodolfo Hoyos Jr.	United States	Western
Violent Road	Howard W. Koch	Brian Keith, Efrem Zimbalist Jr.	United States	
Wind Across the Everglades	Nicholas Ray	Burl Ives, Christopher Plummer	United States	
Windjammer	Louis De Rochemont III		United States	Documentary, sea adventure
Wolf Larsen	Harmon Jones	Barry Sullivan, Peter Graves, Gita Hall	United States	Sea adventure

== 1959 ==
Title	Director	Cast	Country	Subgenre/Notes
800 leguas por el Amazonas	Emilio Gómez Muriel	Carlos López Moctezuma, Rafael Bertrand, Elvira Quintana	Mexico	
The Angry Red Planet	Ib Melchior	Gerald Mohr, Les Tremayne, Nora Hayden	United States	Space adventure
L'arciere nero	Piero Pierotti	Gérard Landry	Italy	
The Atomic Submarine	Spencer Gordon Bennet	Arthur Franz, Dick Foran, Brett Halsey, Tom Conway	United States	Sea adventure, arctic adventure, science fiction adventure
Attack of the Moors	Mario Costa	Rik Battaglia, Chelo Alonso, Gérard Landry	Italy	
The Bandit of Zhobe	John Gilling	Victor Mature	United Kingdom	
La Battaglia di Maratona	Jacques Tourneur, Mario Bava	Steve Reeves, Mylène Demongeot, Sergio Fantoni	Italy; France	
Ben-Hur	William Wyler	Charlton Heston, Stephen Boyd, Jack Hawkins, Haya Harareet	United States	Historical drama, epic film
Le Bossu	André Hunebelle	Jean Marais, Bourvil, Sabine Sesselmann, Hubert Noël	France; Italy	
Caltiki – The Immortal Monster	Riccardo Freda, Mario Bava	John Merivale	Italy; France	Horror adventure
Un canto nel deserto	Marino Girolami	Claudio Villa, Valeria Fabrizi, Paul Muller	Italy	Musical
Caterina Sforza, la leonessa di Romagna	Giorgio Walter Chili	Virna Lisi	Italy	
Cavalier in Devil's Castle	Mario Costa	Massimo Serato, Irène Tunc, Luisella Boni, Pierre Cressoy	Italy; France	
Conspiracy of the Borgias	Antonio Racioppi	Frank Latimore, Constance Smith	Italy	
Cuban Rebel Girls	Barry Mahon	Errol Flynn, Beverly Aadland	United States	
The Death Ship	Georg Tressler	Horst Buchholz, Mario Adorf, Elke Sommer	West Germany	Sea adventure, adventure drama
Desert Desperadoes	Steve Sekely	Ruth Roman, Akim Tamiroff	Italy; United States	
Devil's Cavaliers	Siro Marcellini	Frank Latimore, Gianna Maria Canale, Emma Danieli	Italy	
The Devil's Disciple	Guy Hamilton	Burt Lancaster, Kirk Douglas, Laurence Olivier	United Kingdom; United States	
Due selvaggi a corte	Ferdinando Baldi	Erno Crisa, Leonora Ruffo, Fiorella Mari, Paul Muller, John Kitzmiller	Italy	
Ferry to Hong Kong	Lewis Gilbert	Curd Jürgens, Orson Welles, Sylvia Syms	United Kingdom	Sea adventure
Forbidden Island	Charles B. Griffith	Jon Hall	United States	Sea adventure
The Giant of Marathon	Jacques Tourneur, Mario Bava	Steve Reeves, Mylène Demongeot	Italy; France	
Goliath and the Barbarians	Carlo Campogalliani	Steve Reeves, Chelo Alonso, Bruce Cabot	Italy	
Green Mansions	Mel Ferrer	Audrey Hepburn, Anthony Perkins	United States	Romantic adventure
Hannibal	Edgar G. Ulmer, Carlo Ludovico Bragaglia	Victor Mature, Gabriele Ferzetti	Italy	
Hercules Unchained	Pietro Francisci	Steve Reeves, Sylvia Lopez, Sylva Koscina	Italy; France; Spain	
The House of the Seven Hawks	Richard Thorpe	Robert Taylor, Nicole Maurey, Linda Christian	United Kingdom	Sea adventure
The Indian Tomb	Fritz Lang	Debra Paget, Paul Hubschmid, René Deltgen, Valéry Inkijinoff, Claus Holm, Walter Reyer, Luciana Paluzzi, Sabine Bethmann	West Germany; France; Italy	Romantic adventure
Island of Lost Women	Frank Tuttle	Jeff Richards, Venetia Stevenson, John Smith, Diane Jergens, June Blair, Alan Napier	United States	
John Paul Jones	John Farrow	Robert Stack, Bette Davis, Charles Coburn, Jean-Pierre Aumont, Macdonald Carey, Marisa Pavan, Erin O'Brien	United States	Sea adventure
Journey to the Center of the Earth	Henry Levin	James Mason, Pat Boone, Arlene Dahl	United States	Fantasy adventure
Kapitanskaya Dochka	Vladimir Kaplunovsky	Oleg Strizhenov, Sergei Lukyanov, Iya Arepina	Soviet Union	Romantic adventure
Killers of Kilimanjaro	Richard Thorpe	Robert Taylor	United Kingdom	
Knight Without a Country	Giacomo Gentilomo	Gérard Landry, Constance Smith	Italy	
The Last Days of Pompeii	Mario Bonnard	Steve Reeves, Christine Kaufmann, Fernando Rey, Barbara Carroll	Italy	
El Lazarillo de Tormes	César Fernández Ardavín	Marco Paoletti, Juanjo Menéndez, Carlos Casaravilla, Memmo Carotenuto	Spain; Italy	
The Little Savage	Byron Haskin	Pedro Armendáriz	United States	Pirate film
Der Löwe von Babylon	Johannes Kai, Ramón Torrado	Helmuth Schneider, Georg Thomalla, Theo Lingen, Fernando Sancho	West Germany; Spain	
Marie of the Isles	Georges Combret	Belinda Lee, Alain Saury, Darío Moreno, Magali Noël, Folco Lulli	France; Italy	Sea adventure, romantic adventure
The Merry War of Captain Pedro	Wolfgang Becker	Carlos Thompson	West Germany	Adventure comedy
The Nights of Lucretia Borgia	Sergio Grieco	Belinda Lee, Jacques Sernas, Michèle Mercier	Italy; France	
North by Northwest	Alfred Hitchcock	Cary Grant, Eva Marie Saint, James Mason	United States	Thriller
North West Frontier	J. Lee Thompson	Lauren Bacall, Kenneth More, Herbert Lom	United Kingdom	
La notte del grande assalto	Giuseppe Maria Scotese	Agnès Laurent, Fausto Tozzi, Kerima	Italy; France	
Peter Voss, Hero of the Day	Georg Marischka	O.W. Fischer, Linda Christian, Walter Giller	West Germany	Adventure comedy, crime film
Pier 5, Havana	Edward L. Cahn	Cameron Mitchell	United States	
The Pirate and the Slave Girl	Piero Pierotti	Lex Barker, Chelo Alonso, Massimo Serato, Graziella Granata	Italy; France	
Prisoner of the Volga	Victor Tourjansky	John Derek, Elsa Martinelli, Dawn Addams, Gert Fröbe, Charles Vanel, Wolfgang Preiss, Rik Battaglia	Italy; France; West Germany	
Prisonniers de la brousse	Willy Rozier	Georges Marchal, Jean-Pierre Kérien, Nadine Alari	France	
SOS – Gletscherpilot	Victor Vicas	Hermann Geiger, Annemarie Düringer, Robert Freitag	Switzerland	Mountaineering adventure
SOS Pacific	Guy Green	Eddie Constantine, Richard Attenborough, Pier Angeli, Eva Bartok, John Gregson	United Kingdom	
The Scavengers	John Cromwell	Vince Edwards, Carol Ohmart, Vic Diaz	Philippines; United States	
Le secret du Chevalier d'Éon	Jacqueline Audry	Andrée Debar, Bernard Blier, Dany Robin, Gabriele Ferzetti, Isa Miranda	France; Italy	
Son of the Red Corsair	Primo Zeglio	Lex Barker, Sylvia Lopez	Italy	Pirate film
Sonatas	Juan Antonio Bardem	Francisco Rabal, María Félix, Aurora Bautista, Fernando Rey	Spain	
Stars at Noon	Jacques Ertaud, Marcel Ichac	Roger Blin, Pierre Perret, Lionel Terray, René Desmaison	France	Mountaineering adventure
The Stranglers of Bombay	Terence Fisher	Guy Rolfe	United Kingdom	Horror adventure
Tarzan's Greatest Adventure	John Guillermin	Gordon Scott, Anthony Quayle, Sean Connery	United States	
Tarzan, the Ape Man	Joseph M. Newman	Denny Miller, Cesare Danova, Robert Douglas	United States	
Third Man on the Mountain	Ken Annakin	Michael Rennie, Janet Munro, James Donald, Herbert Lom	United States; United Kingdom	Mountaineering adventure, family-oriented adventure
The Tiger of Eschnapur	Fritz Lang	Debra Paget, Paul Hubschmid, René Deltgen, Valéry Inkijinoff, Claus Holm, Walter Reyer, Luciana Paluzzi, Sabine Bethmann	West Germany; France; Italy	Adventure drama
Timbuktu	Jacques Tourneur	Victor Mature, Yvonne De Carlo	United States	
Tunis Top Secret	Bruno Paolinelli	Elsa Martinelli, Giorgia Moll, Massimo Serato, Willy Fritsch, Claus Biederstaedt, Chelo Alonso	Italy; West Germany	Adventure comedy
Le vent se lève	Yves Ciampi	Curd Jürgens, Mylène Demongeot	France	Sea adventure
Virgin Sacrifice	Fernando Wagner	David DaLie, Angélica Morales, Antonio Gutiérrez	United States	
Watusi	Kurt Neumann	George Montgomery, Taina Elg, David Farrar	United States	
The White Warrior	Riccardo Freda	Steve Reeves, Giorgia Moll, Scilla Gabel	Italy; Yugoslavia	
The Witch Beneath the Sea	Zygmunt Sulistrowski	John Sutton, Richard Olizar, Gina Albert	Brazil	
The Wreck of the Mary Deare	Michael Anderson	Gary Cooper, Charlton Heston	United Kingdom; United States	Sea adventure
