= Sea Robin XFC =

XFC UAV

General information
- Type: Submarine-launched UAV
- Manufacturer: U.S. Naval Research Laboratory
- Primary user: United States Navy
- Number built: 1

History
- Introduction date: 2013
- First flight: 2013

Sea Robin XFC is a submarine launched Unmanned Aerial Vehicle platform that the United States Naval Research Laboratory is testing. Expected launches will be from Seawolf, Los Angeles and Virginia class submarines

Contractor Oceaneering developed the launch canister system.

== Experimental Fuel Cell UAV (XFC) ==
The platform launches an experimental fuel cell UAV or XFC UAV from a torpedo tube of a nuclear submarine and stealth UAV being tested is an eXperimental fuel cell using hydrogen.

The UAV wings unfolded after launch into a X wing format. The UAV has a propeller in the rear and a camera dome in front.

The system was tested from USS Providence in late 2013.
