= Samuel Dent =

Samuel or Sam Dent may refer to:

- Samuel Dent (politician), see List of colonial governors of Grenada
- Sam Dent, character in The Americano (1955 film)
- Sam Dent, musician in The Dear Hunter
- Dr Samuel Dent PFHEA, Head of Academic Quality Development at Staffordshire University
