= USS Providence (SSN-719) =

Los Angeles-class nuclear-powered attack submarine of the US Navy

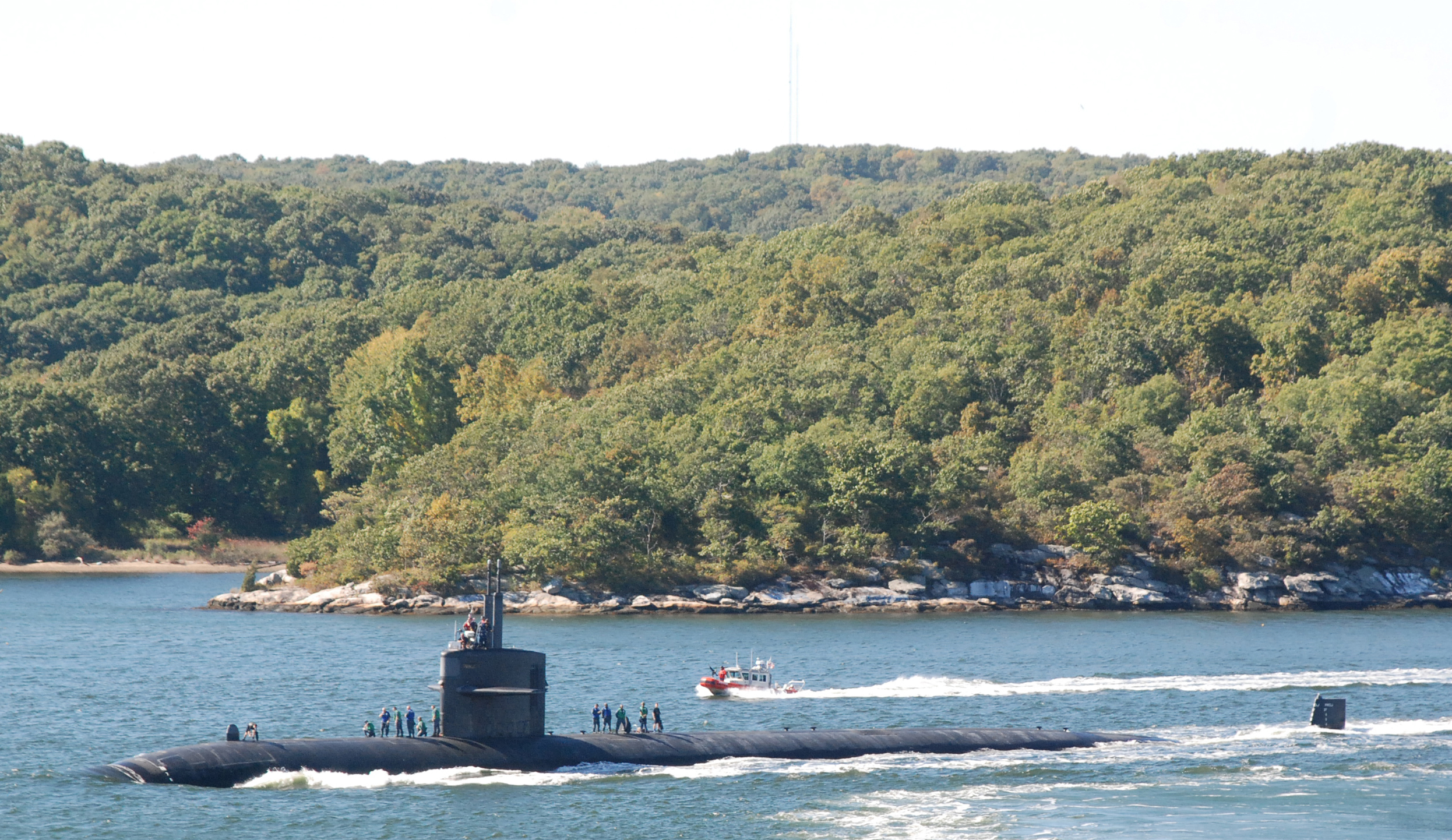
- Providence transiting the Thames River, Connecticut

History

United States
- Name: USS Providence
- Namesake: City of Providence
- Awarded: 16 April 1979
- Builder: General Dynamics Electric Boat
- Laid down: 14 October 1982
- Launched: 4 August 1984
- Acquired: 26 June 1985
- Commissioned: 27 July 1985
- Decommissioned: 22 August 2022
- Out of service: 2 December 2021
- Stricken: 22 August 2022
- Identification: UIC 21029
- Motto: Providentia Remedium Belli; (Latin: "Providence for war is the best prevention for it")
- Status: Being de-fueled/inactivated
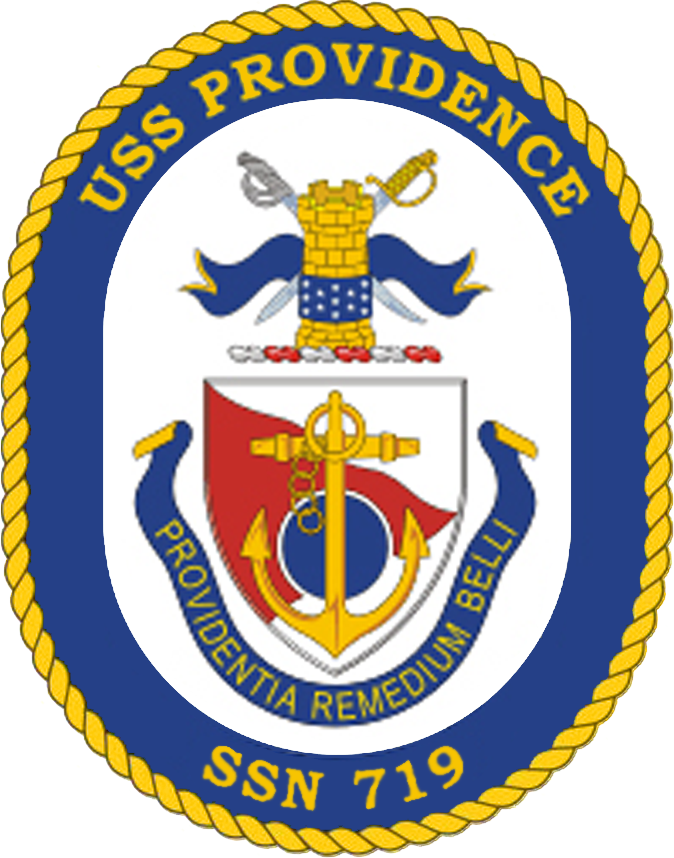
- Badge

General characteristics
- Class & type: Los Angeles-class submarine
- Displacement: 5,781 long tons (5,874 t) light; 6,184 long tons (6,283 t) full; 403 long tons (409 t) dead
- Length: 110.3 m (361 ft 11 in)
- Beam: 10 m (32 ft 10 in)
- Draft: 9.4 m (30 ft 10 in)
- Propulsion: 1 × S6G PWR nuclear reactor with D2W core (165 MW), HEU 93.5%; 2 × steam turbines (33,500) shp; 1 × shaft; 1 × secondary propulsion motor 325 hp (242 kW)
- Speed: Surfaced:20 knots (23 mph; 37 km/h); Submerged: +20 knots (23 mph; 37 km/h) (official)
- Complement: 12 officers; 98 enlisted
- Sensors & processing systems: BQQ-10 passive sonar, BQS-15 detecting and ranging sonar, BYG-1 fire control, BLQ-10 radio and ESM, BPS-15H radar
- Armament: 4 × 21 in (533 mm) bow tubes, 10 Mk48 ADCAP torpedo reloads, Tomahawk land attack missile block 3 SLCM range 1,700 nautical miles (3,100 km), Harpoon anti–surface ship missile range 70 nautical miles (130 km), mine laying Mk67 mobile Mk60 captor mines

USS Providence (SSN-719), a Los Angeles-class submarine, is the fifth vessel of the United States Navy to be named for Providence, Rhode Island. The contract to build her was awarded to the Electric Boat Division of General Dynamics Corporation in Groton, Connecticut on 16 April 1979 and her keel was laid down on 14 October 1982. She was launched on 4 August 1984 sponsored by Mrs. William F. Smith, and commissioned on 27 July 1985.

Providence is the first Los Angeles class submarine to be equipped with the Tomahawk missile Vertical Launch System (VLS). While others used test boxes and programs, Providence was the first submarine to launch a Tomahawk cruise missile from the VLS system using its combat system CCS MK1 and associated software Program C4.1.

== History ==
Providence has been deployed several times to the Western Atlantic Ocean, the Mediterranean Sea, and the Persian Gulf. Some of the ports visited have included Port Canaveral (Cocoa Beach, Florida) and Port Everglades (Fort Lauderdale, Florida), Naval Station Roosevelt Roads, Puerto Rico, Tromsø, Norway, Halifax, Canada, Gibraltar, Toulon, France, Souda Bay, Crete, La Maddalena, Italy, and Koper, Slovenia, in the Mediterranean, and al-Manama, Bahrain, and both Dubai and Jebel Ali, United Arab Emirates in the Persian Gulf. The submarine has made transits of the Suez Canal in 1998, 2001, and 2003 and participated in Operation Southern Watch, Operation Enduring Freedom and Operation Iraqi Freedom, where she earned the nickname "Big dog of the Red Sea wolf pack."

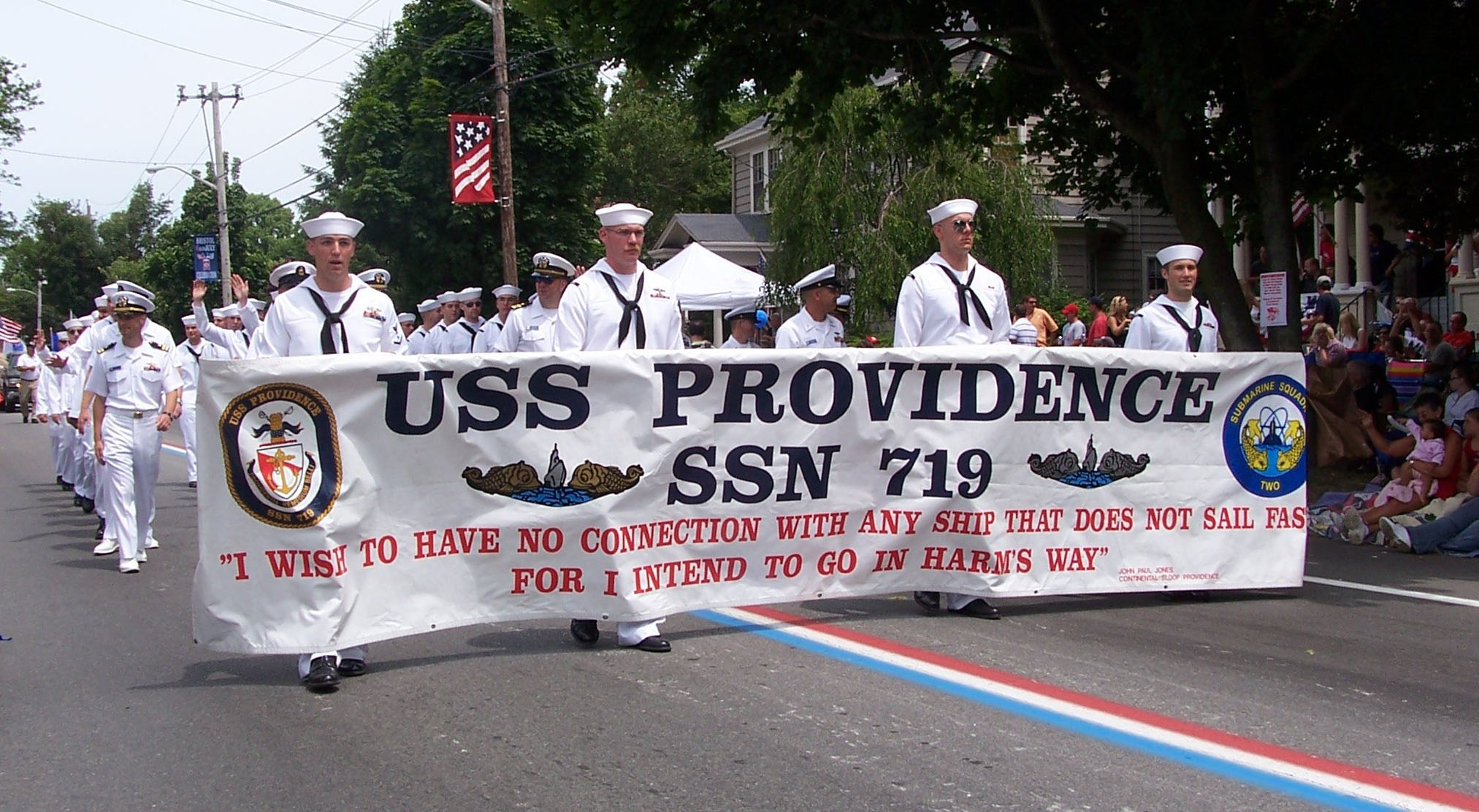
USS Providence sailors march in the 2007 Bristol Fourth of July Parade

She has since been retrofitted with numerous upgrades including the AN/BYG-1 Fire Control system and AN/BQQ-10 ARCI Sonar suite. Her achievements continued in 2006–2007 as she has also completed an around-the-world deployment to the Western Pacific Ocean earning the coveted Order of Magellan certificate, participating in Exercise MALABAR 2006, and many other significant assignments. Port visits included Singapore, Yokosuka and Okinawa in Japan, Goa in India, as well as transits through both the Suez Canal and Panama Canal.

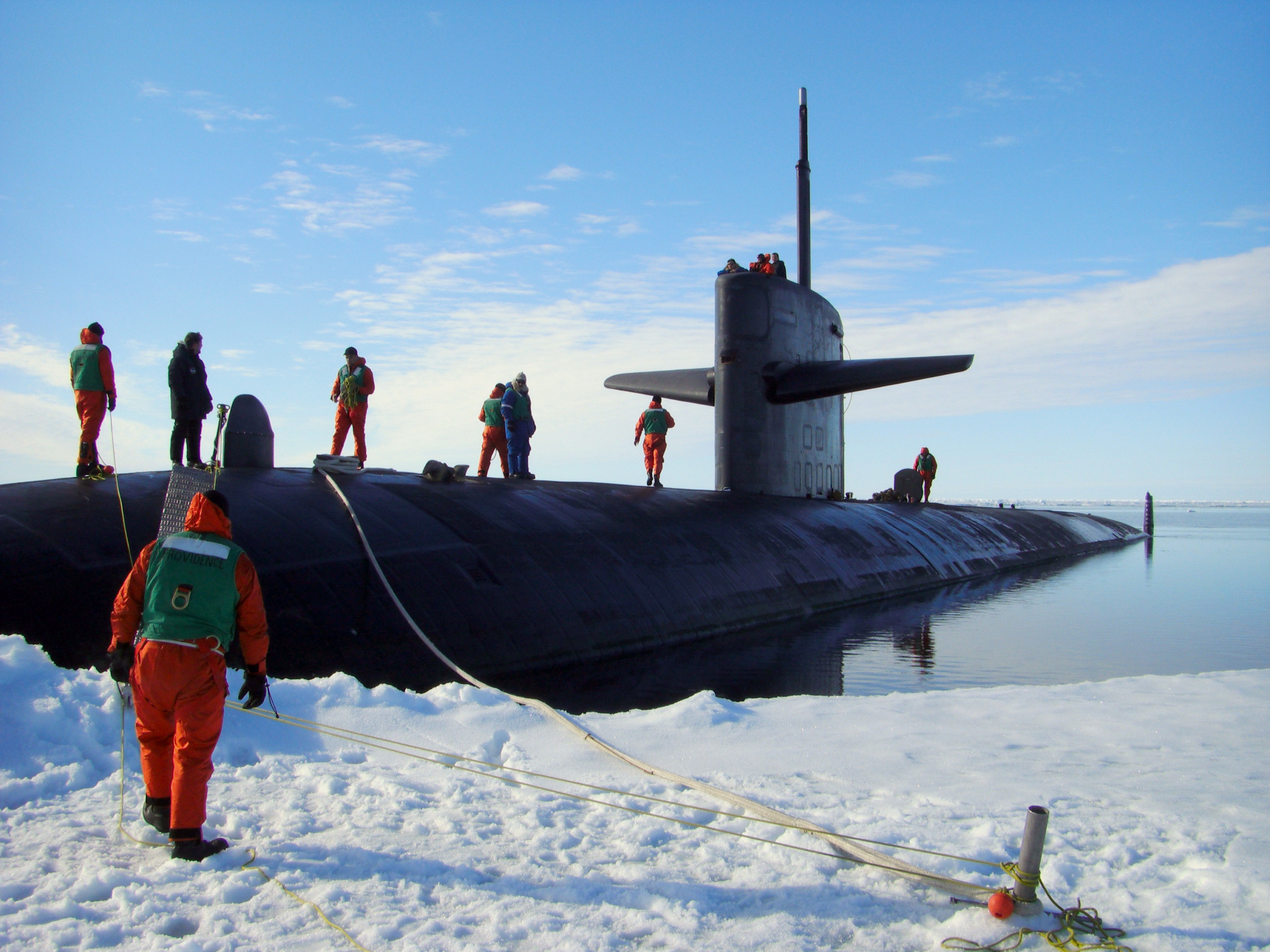
Providence in the Arctic ice, 1 July 2008

In 2008, she completed another deployment to the Western Pacific Ocean, only this time taking a northern route, successfully transiting under the arctic ice cap. On 1 July 2008 she surfaced at the North Pole to commemorate the fiftieth anniversary of the historic feat of the USS Nautilus (SSN-571) in 1958.

On March 19, 2011, Providence launched Tomahawk cruise missiles at Libyan air defenses as part of Operation Odyssey Dawn.

With the decommissioning of USS Bremerton (SSN-698) on 21 May 2021, Providence became the oldest active Los Angeles-class submarine in the US Fleet. She was then assigned to Submarine Squadron 12 at US Naval Submarine Base New London, Groton, Connecticut.

== Inactivation and decommissioning ==
On 20 August 2021, a Change of Homeport ceremony was held at the Naval Submarine Base New London, in Groton, Connecticut. Providence was then transferred to Kitsap Naval Base in Bremerton, Washington for decommissioning after 37 years of service. Providence was officially placed in reserve status, inactivated but in commission on 2 December 2021. The submarine was officially decommissioned on 15 August 2022 (although she was decommissioned on 22 August 2022 in the Naval Vessel Register) and the decommissioning ceremony for Providence was held on 1 September 2022.

== Awards and decorations ==
- four Navy Unit Commendations
- six Meritorious Unit Commendations
- six Battle E (Navy "E" Ribbon) awards (three of which were consecutive)
- four Navy Expeditionary Medals
- two National Defense Service Medals
- three Armed Forces Expeditionary Medals
- Global War on Terrorism Expeditionary Medal
- Global War on Terrorism Service Medal
- two Sea Service Deployment Ribbons
- Arctic Service Ribbon

Providence won the Tomahawk Strike Derby in 1988 with a 5-second time on target. The USS Providence was the winner of the 2008 Arleigh Burke Award for superior performance in battle efficiency, presented by Fleet Forces Command on Monday 16 June 2008. Providence has, once again, earned the coveted 2008–2009 Battle Efficiency 'E' for COMSUBRON 2.

== In popular culture ==
- Providence appears in the 1986 Tom Clancy novel Red Storm Rising, along with sister submarines Boston and Chicago.
