= Jungle Headhunters =

1951 film directed by Julian Lesser

- Written by: Joseph Ansen; Larry Lansburgh
- Produced by: Julian Lesser; Lewis Cotlow (associate)
- Cinematography: Jules Bucher; Bodo Wuth
- Edited by: Robert Leo
- Music by: Paul Sawtell
- Production company: Thalia Productions
- Distributed by: RKO Radio Pictures
- Release date: May 4, 1951 (US)

Jungle Headhunters is a 1951 American documentary film produced by Julian Lesser, which covers an expedition through Central and South America by the explorer Lewis Cotlow.
