= The Purple Mask =

1955 film by H. Bruce Humberstone

- Film poster by Reynold Brown
- Directed by: H. Bruce Humberstone
- Written by: Oscar Brodney (from the play Le Chevalier au masque by Paul Armont and Jean Manoussi)
- Produced by: Howard Christie
- Starring: Tony Curtis; Colleen Miller; Angela Lansbury; Gene Barry; Dan O'Herlihy
- Cinematography: Irving Glassberg
- Edited by: Ted J. Kent
- Music by: Heinz Roemheld; Herman Stein
- Production company: Universal Pictures
- Distributed by: Universal Pictures
- Release date: June 15, 1955 (New York City)
- Running time: 82 minutes
- Country: United States
- Language: English

The Purple Mask is a 1955 American historical adventure film directed by H. Bruce Humberstone starring Tony Curtis and set in 1803 France.

== Plot ==
France, 1803, is under Napoleon Bonaparte's rule, but royalist adversaries rally behind the mysterious Purple Mask, whose daring feats give them hope. A police captain, Rochet, goes after the Purple Mask only to be taken captive by him, whereupon Napoleon assigns the expert swordsman Brisquet to go after him.

The lovely Laurette de Latour, daughter of a duke and romantic interest of Captain Laverne, is on the side of the royalists. She helps hatch a scheme in which the foppish René de Traviere, who seems able with a sword, impersonates the Purple Mask to infiltrate Napoleon's ranks and free her kidnapped father.

Laurette is unaware that René is, in fact, the Purple Mask, who continues his charade, drawing ridicule on himself, until ultimately he is imprisoned along with the duke. Laurette discovers his true identity while imprisoned.

On their way to the guillotine, René, Laurette and the duke are rescued in a pre-arranged raid through the sewers of Paris by the royalist rebels. Napoleon, glad to be rid of the troublemakers, permits René and Laurette to leave the country for England.

== Cast ==
- Tony Curtis as René de Traviere / The Purple Mask
- Colleen Miller as Laurette de Latour
- Angela Lansbury as Madame Valentine
- Gene Barry as Capt. Charles Laverne
- Allison Hayes as Irene de Bournotte
- John Hoyt as Rochet
- Dan O'Herlihy as Brisquet
- Robert Cornthwaite as Napoleon
- Paul Cavanagh as Duc de Latour

== Background ==
The film was based on a successful play of the same name. The original 1913 French play titled Le Chevalier au masque, by Paul Armont and Jean Manoussi, was adapted into English as The Purple Mask by Matheson Lang. The play opened in London in 1918 and ran for 365 performances. A later production in New York in 1920, starring Leo Ditrichstein, was less successful, closing after 139 shows.

== See also ==
- List of American films of 1955
- List of adventure films of the 1950s
- List of American films of 1955
- List of Universal Pictures films
