= Monsoon (1952 film) =

1952 film by Rod Amateau

- Theatrical release poster
- Directed by: Rod Amateau
- Screenplay by: Forrest Judd; David Robinson; Leonardo Bercovici
- Based on: Romeo et Jeanette by Jean Anouilh
- Produced by: Gordon Griffith; Forrest Judd
- Starring: Ursula Thiess; Diana Douglas; George Nader; Ellen Corby; Philip Stainton; Myron Healey; Eric Pohlmann
- Cinematography: Ernest Haller
- Edited by: George Gale
- Music by: Vasant Desai
- Production companies: CFG Productions; Film Group Judd
- Distributed by: United Artists
- Release date: December 14, 1952
- Running time: 79 minutes
- Country: United States
- Language: English

Monsoon is a 1952 American drama film directed by Rod Amateau and starring Ursula Thiess, Diana Douglas, George Nader, Myron Healey, Ellen Corby, Philip Stainton and Eric Pohlmann. It was released on December 14, 1952 by United Artists.

== Plot ==
Julia brings her fiancé and his mother to a village in India to meet her father and brother. Trouble ensues when Julia's seductive younger sister arrives.

== Cast ==
- Ursula Thiess as Jeanette
- Diana Douglas as Julia
- George Nader as Burton
- Ellen Corby as Katie
- Philip Stainton as Putsi
- Myron Healey as Rault
- Eric Pohlmann as Molac
