= The Iron Glove =

1954 film by William Castle

- Directed by: William Castle
- Screenplay by: Jesse L. Lasky Jr. DeVallon Scott; Douglas Heyes
- Story by: Robert E. Kent; Samuel J. Jacoby
- Produced by: Sam Katzman
- Starring: Robert Stack; Ursula Thiess; Richard Stapley
- Cinematography: Henry Freulich
- Edited by: Gene Havlick
- Music by: Mischa Bakaleinikoff
- Color process: Technicolor
- Production company: Sam Katzman Productions
- Distributed by: Columbia Pictures
- Release date: April 1954
- Running time: 77 minutes
- Country: United States
- Language: English

The Iron Glove is a 1954 American historical adventure film directed by William Castle and starring Robert Stack, Ursula Thiess and Richard Stapley. It was based on the adventures of the Jacobite Charles Wogan.

== Plot ==
Irish Jacobite Charles Wogan comes to Scotland and attempts to aid Prince James Stuart in his quest to overthrow King George I.

== Cast ==
- Robert Stack as Charles Wogan
- Ursula Thiess as Ann Brett
- Richard Wylee as Prince James Stuart (as Richard Stapley)
- Charles Irwin as Timothy O'Toole
- Alan Hale, Jr. as Patrick Gaydon
- Leslie Bradley as Duke of Somerfield
- Louis Merrill as Count DuLusac
- Paul Cavanagh as Cavenly, advisor to Prince James
- Otto Waldis as George I of Great Britain (uncredited)
- Rica Owen as Princess Maria Clementina Sobieska (uncredited)
- David Bruce as Austrian Sergeant at Tavern (uncredited)

== Production ==
It was originally called The Kiss and the Sword and was meant to star Cornel Wilde. Sam Katzman announced it in May 1952.

In November 1952, Katzman amended his contract with Columbia to make 15 films a year for seven years, for one that allowed him to make 20 films (17 features and three serials). The films in 1953 would include The Kiss and the Sword.

In August 1953, Katzman announced the film would be made as part of a slate of five films to be made between August 18 and December 15 that year, the others being Battle of Rogue River, Pirates of Tripoli, The Miami Story, and Jungle Maneater.

In September, Katzman announced the female lead would be played by Ursula Thiess, who had been brought out from Germany by RKO two years previously, but had not made any movies. The same month, Robert Stack was cast as the male lead.

The sets were designed by art director Paul Palmentola. It was shot in Technicolor.

Robert Stack later wrote, "I wore tights and sang a song, and if that wasn't enough to kill off an already ill-fated film, I don't know what else would."
