= Manhunt in the Jungle =

- Theatrical release poster
- Directed by: Tom McGowan
- Screenplay by: Sam Mervin; Owen Crump
- Produced by: Cedric Francis
- Starring: Robin Hughes; Luis Álvarez; James Wilson; Jorge Montoro; Natalia Manzuelas; John B. Symmes
- Cinematography: Robert J. Brooker
- Edited by: Robert B. Warwick Jr.
- Music by: Howard Jackson
- Production company: Warner Bros. Pictures
- Distributed by: Warner Bros. Pictures
- Release date: April 11, 1958
- Running time: 79 minutes
- Country: United States
- Language: English

Manhunt in the Jungle is a 1958 American adventure film directed by Tom McGowan and written by Sam Mervin and Owen Crump. The film stars Robin Hughes, Luis Álvarez, James Wilson, Jorge Montoro, Natalia Mazuelos and John B. Symmes. The film was released by Warner Bros. Pictures on April 11, 1958.

== Cast ==
- Robin Hughes as Cmdr. George M. Dyott
- Luis Álvarez as Aloique
- James Wilson as Col. P.H. Fawcett
- Jorge Montoro as Carissimo
- Natalia Mazuelos as Pedro's Wife
- John B. Symmes as John B. Symmes
- Richard McCloskey as Dr. Emmett Wilson
- Harry Knapp as Portuguese Explorer
- Emilio Meiners as Pedro
- Enrique González as Bernadino
- M. Torres Acho as Juan
- Alfonso Santilla as Julio

== See also ==
- The Lost City of Z (2016)
