= List of fantasy films of the 1950s =

Below is a list of fantasy films released in the 1950s.

== List ==
Title	Director	Cast	Country	Notes
1950
Beauty and the Devil	René Clair	Michel Simon, Gérard Philipe, Nicole Besnard	France	
Cinderella	Clyde Geronimi Wilfred Jackson, Hamilton Luske for Walt Disney		United States	Animated film
Orphée	Jean Cocteau	Jean Marais, Marie Déa, François Périer	France	
The Magic Sword (1950 film)	Vojislav Nanović	Rade Marković, Vera Ilić-Đukić, Milivoje Živanović, Marko Marinković, Bata Paskaljević, Milan Ajvaz, Ljubiša Jokanović	Yugoslavia	
1951
Alice in Wonderland	Clyde Geronimi, Wilfred Jackson, Hamilton Luske for Walt Disney	Voices of: Katherine Beaumont, J. Pat O'Malley, Sterling Holloway, Ed Wynn, Jerry Colonna, Verna Felton	United States	Animated film
Scrooge	Brian Desmond Hurst	Alastair Sim, Kathleen Harrison, Mervyn Johns	United Kingdom	
The Night Before Christmas	Valentina Brumberg, Zinaida Brumberg	Mikhail Yanshin, Vera Maretskaya, Nikolai Gritsenko	Soviet Union	Animated film
The Tales of Hoffmann	Michael Powell, Emeric Pressburger	Moira Shearer, Robert Rounseville, Pamela Brown	United Kingdom; United States	
1952
Jack and the Beanstalk	Jean Yarbrough	Bud Abbott, Lou Costello, Buddy Baer	United States	
The Scarlet Flower	Lev Atamanov	Nikolay Bogolyubov, Maria Babanova	Soviet Union	Animated
The Snow Maiden	Ivan Ivanov-Vano		Soviet Union	Animated
1953
The 5,000 Fingers of Dr. T.	Roy Rowland	Peter Lind Hayes, Mary Healy, Hans Conried	United States	
Peter Pan	Clyde Geronimi, Wilfred Jackson, Hamilton Luske		United States	Animated film
Sadko	Alexander Ptushko	Sergei Stolyarov, Alla Larionova, Mikhail Troyanovsky	Soviet Union	
Ugetsu	Kenji Mizoguchi	Machiko Kyō, Masayuki Mori, Kinuyo Tanaka, Sakae Ozawa	Japan	
1954
Ulysses	Mario Camerini	Kirk Douglas, Silvana Mangano, Anthony Quinn	Italy	
1955
A Kid for Two Farthings	Carol Reed	Celia Johnson, Diana Dors, David Kossoff	United Kingdom; United States	
The Enchanted Boy	Aleksandra Snezhko-Blotskaya	Valentina Sperantova, Erast Garin, Georgiy Vitsin	Soviet Union	
Kismet	Vincente Minnelli	Howard Keel, Ann Blyth, Dolores Gray	United States	
1956
Carousel	Henry King	Gordon MacRae, Shirley Jones, Cameron Mitchell, Barbara Ruick	United States	
Ilya Muromets (US Title: Sword and the Dragon)	Alexander Ptushko	Boris Andreyev, Andrei Abrikosov, Natalya Medvedeva	Soviet Union	
Starik Khottabych (US Title: The Flying Carpet)	Gennadiy Kazansky	Nikolai Volkov, Alexey Litvinov	Soviet Union	
The Twelve Months	Ivan Ivanov-Vano		Soviet Union	Animated
1957
The Pied Piper of Hamelin	Bretaigne Windust	Doodles Weaver, Kay Starr, Claude Rains	United States	Television film
Sabu and the Magic Ring	George Blair	John Doucette, George Khoury, John Lomma	United States	
The Seventh Seal	Ingmar Bergman	Max von Sydow, Gunnar Björnstrand, Bengt Ekerot	Sweden	
The Snow Queen	Lev Atamanov	Maria Babanova, Sergei Martinson	Soviet Union	Animated film
The Story of Mankind	Irwin Allen	Ronald Colman	United States	
1958
Bell, Book and Candle	Richard Quine	James Stewart, Kim Novak, Jack Lemmon	United States	
The Seventh Voyage of Sinbad	Nathan H. Juran	Kerwin Mathews, Kathryn Grant, Richard Eyer	United States	
tom thumb	George Pal	Russ Tamblyn, Alan Young, Terry-Thomas	United Kingdom; United States	
1959
1001 Arabian Nights	Jack Kinney		United States	Animated film
The Adventures of Buratino	Ivan Ivanov-Vano	Georgiy Vitsin, Yevgeniy Vesnik, Aleksandr Baranov	Soviet Union	Animated
Black Orpheus	Marcel Camus	Breno Mello, Marpessa Dawn, Léa Garcia	Brazil; France; Italy	
The Birth of Japan	Hiroshi Inagaki	Yoko Tsukasa, Kyōko Kagawa, Kōji Tsuruta	Japan	
Darby O'Gill and the Little People	Robert Stevenson	Albert Sharpe, Janet Munro, Sean Connery	United States	
Journey to the Center of the Earth	Henry Levin	Pat Boone, James Mason, Arlene Dahl	United States	
The Magic Weaver (Maria the Weaver)	Aleksandr Rou	Mikhail Kuznetsov, Georgy Millyar, Anatoly Kubatsky	Soviet Union	
Sampo (US Title: Day the Earth Froze)	Alexander Ptushko, Gregg Sebelious, Holger Harrivirta	Nina Anderson, Ingrid Elhardt, Marvin Miller	Finland; Soviet Union	
Sleeping Beauty	Les Clark, Eric Larson, Clyde Geronimi, Wolfgang Reitherman for Walt Disney		United States	Animated film
