= Ursula Thiess =

German film actress (1924-2010)

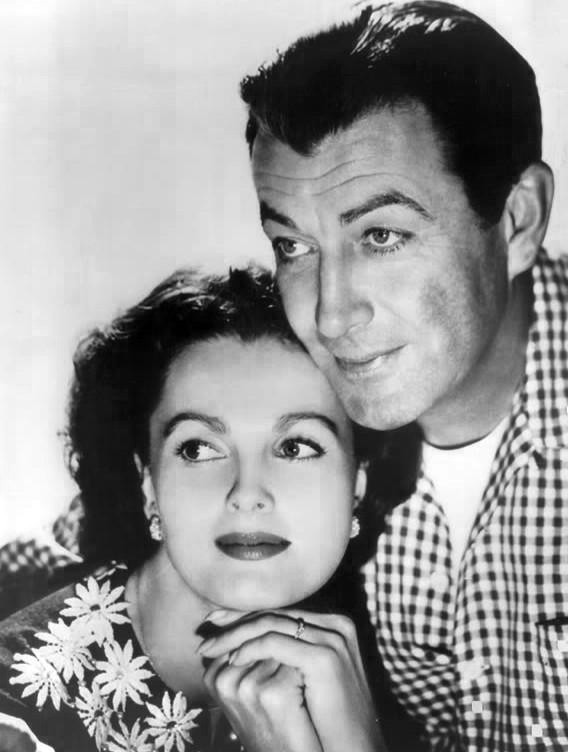
- Thiess with husband Robert Taylor in 1960
- Born: Ursula Schmidt; May 15, 1924; Hamburg, Germany
- Died: June 19, 2010 (aged 86); Burbank, California, U.S.
- Resting place: Forest Lawn Memorial Park, Glendale
- Years active: 1949–1972
- Spouse(s): Georg Otto Thiess (m. 19??; div. 1947) Robert Taylor (m. 1954; died 1969) Marshall Schacker (m. 1973; died 1986)
- Children: 4

Ursula Thiess (May 15, 1924 – June 19, 2010) was a German film actress who had a brief Hollywood career in the 1950s.

Thiess began her career on the stage in her native Germany and by dubbing female voices in American films as Ursula Schmidt. After she married Georg Otto Thiess, she became Ursula Thiess and was featured in many German magazines, including several cover photos, as well as the cover of Life magazine, 1954, as an up-and-coming model, and she was dubbed the "most beautiful woman in the world." She left postwar Germany at the urging of Howard Hughes and signed with RKO. She co-starred with Robert Stack in The Iron Glove (1952), Rock Hudson in Bengal Brigade (1954), Glenn Ford in The Americano (1955), and Robert Mitchum in Bandido (1956).

== Family ==
Ursula was born in 1924 to Wilhelmine Lange and Hans Schmidt. At age 17, for refusing to join the League of German Girls, she was drafted into service working as farm laborer. After that, she returned to do acting on stage, where she met and married her first husband, German film producer Georg Otto Thiess. They had two children, Manuela and Michael. That marriage dissolved in 1947, and in 1948, she began a modeling career in Berlin. Her unusual beauty caught the eye of Howard Hughes, who made her a contract offer to join RKO Studios.

She met Robert Taylor in 1952, and they married on May 23, 1954, in Jackson Hole, Wyoming. She virtually abandoned her film career to become a mother and housewife. The Taylors had two children Terrance "Terry" (b. June 18, 1955, in Santa Monica, California) and Tessa (b. August 16, 1959, in Santa Monica). They moved with Ursula's two children from her previous marriage, to their 114-acre (0.46 km^{2}) ranch in Brentwood, California, in 1956, and lived there until Taylor's death from cancer in 1969. Ursula's two children, Manuela and Michael, had many adjustment problems adapting to their new life, and were often in trouble with the police, causing the family to suffer bad publicity as a result. Her son, Michael, who had served a year in a German prison for attempting to poison his natural father, died of a drug overdose on May 26, 1969, shortly before Robert Taylor's own death. Ursula discovered him dead when she stopped by his motel to drop off some medication for him.

After Taylor's death, she was obliged to sell their ranch. She moved to Bel Air, and in 1973, she married film distributor Marshall Schacker. They remained married until his death from cancer in 1986.

Ursula was known to be an excellent home decorator, gourmet cook, shadow-box maker, and UCLA Children's Hospital volunteer. As the wife of Robert Taylor, she gave up her acting career to become a full-time mother and homemaker, though she generally accompanied her husband on film locations, often with her two younger children by Taylor. She even had a recurring role on his hit ABC-TV series, The Detectives She was known to go hunting and fishing with Taylor, who was a passionate sportsman.

Ursula Thiess wrote her autobiography ...But I Have Promises to Keep: My Life Before, With and After Robert Taylor.

Thiess died of natural causes in an assisted-living care facility in Burbank on June 19, 2010, at the age of 86. She was survived by three of her four children, Manuela, Terry, and Tessa. She is interred alongside her husband and her son at Forest Lawn Memorial Park in Glendale, California.

== Filmography ==
Year	Title	Role	Notes
1949	Keepers of the Night		
1952	Monsoon	Jeanette	
1954	The Iron Glove	Ann Brett	
1954	Bengal Brigade	Latah	
1955	The Americano	Marianna	
1956	Bandido	Lisa Kennedy	
1972	Left Hand of Gemini		(final film role)
