= Lewis Cotlow =

American film director

Lewis Nathaniel Cotlow
- Born: February 5, 1898; Brooklyn, New York, US
- Died: 1987 (aged 88–89); North Palm Beach, Florida, US
- Education: New York University, George Washington University
- Awards: Order of Magellan

Lewis Cotlow (February 5, 1898 – 1987) was an American explorer, writer, filmmaker, and fellow of the Royal Geographical Society.

== Biography ==
He was born to Nathaniel Cotlow and Lena (maiden name: Green) Cotlow. Cotlow served in the US Army during World War I and became a supercargo with the United States Merchant Marine.

In 1919–1921, he traveled to the harbor of the Far East and the Middle East. He studied at New York University. Cotlow served in the naval intelligence USA during World II.

After attending George Washington University he made more than 30 expeditions travelled to Africa, South America, Indonesia, and the Arctic, the Amazon, Australia, and New Guinea from 1930s–1950s to film. His first technicolor movie was filmed on location in Africa and was co-produced with a man called Armand Dennis (a wildlife photographer)

On December 18, 1966, he married Charlotte Faith Mesenheimer.

In his lifetime, he was awarded the Explorers Club Medal and Order of Magellan and was a member of The Explorers Club. He was also employed as a New York insurance broker.

He left his collections to Cincinnati Museum of Natural History.

== Major works ==
=== Books ===
- Passport to Adventure (1942)
- Amazon Head-Hunters (1953)
- Zanzabuku: Dangerous Safari (book and film, 1956)
- In Search of the Primitive: An Independent Explorer's Life with the Last of the Exotic Peoples of Africa, the Arctic, New Guinea (1966)
- Twilight of the Primitive (1971)

=== Films ===
- Through Africa Unarmed (c. 1937; lost)
- Upper Amazon and High Andes Adventure (1941)
- Savage Splendor (1949)
- Jungle Headhunters (1949)
- Zanzabuku: Dangerous Safari (book and film, 1956)
- High Arctic (film, 1963)
