= Bandido (1956 film) =

1956 film by Richard Fleischer

- Theatrical release poster
- Directed by: Richard Fleischer
- Written by: Earl Felton
- Produced by: Robert L. Jacks
- Starring: Robert Mitchum; Ursula Thiess; Gilbert Roland; Zachary Scott; Rodolfo Acosta; Henry Brandon; Douglas Fowley
- Cinematography: Ernest Laszlo
- Edited by: Robert Golden
- Music by: Max Steiner
- Production company: D.R.M. Productions
- Distributed by: United Artists
- Release date: September 1956
- Running time: 92 minutes
- Country: United States
- Language: English
- Box office: $1.65 million (US)

Bandido is a 1956 American Western film directed by Richard Fleischer and starring Robert Mitchum, Ursula Thiess, Gilbert Roland, and Zachary Scott. The film, set in the Mexican Revolution and filmed on location around Acapulco, was written by Earl Felton. Robert Mitchum also co-produced the film through his DRM Productions company.

== Plot ==
In 1916 during the Mexican Revolution, American Wilson checks into a Mexican hotel in the midst of a pitched battle. Equipped with a suitcase full of Mk 2 grenades, he throws a few "samples" at the "Regulares" in the square, enabling revolutionary Col. José Escobar to rout his enemies. Escobar's men praise Wilson, calling him "El Alacran" (the scorpion) for the sting of his grenades. Wilson offers to get Escobar's poorly equipped men weapons and ammunition, in exchange for half the loot, but Escobar decides to attack the next town without his help. When Escobar returns, defeated, Wilson explains that an American arms dealer named Kennedy is on his way to sell a large shipment of arms and ammunition to General Lorenzo. Wilson proposes capturing Kennedy and forcing him to turn over his wares to Escobar.

Before Kennedy is captured, he sends an aide to Lorenzo to set a trap. Kennedy says the arms are at his fishing lodge. Escobar decides to send him there with some of his men, but Wilson, who is attracted to Kennedy's discontented wife Lisa, convinces Escobar to send her instead, much to Kennedy's dismay. Escobar orders that she be shot if no arms are found, but Wilson helps her escape and encourages her to flee north to the U.S.

Angered by what he perceives as treachery, Escobar imprisons Wilson along with Kennedy, to await execution. Wilson somehow still has two hand grenades, which he uses to blow their way out. Escobar's men chase them and manage to shoot Kennedy. The rebels have to break off the search, however, when the Regulares advance on the town. Wilson takes Kennedy to a priest, who removes the bullet, and manages to get the actual location of the arms cache. When Lisa arrives with the Regulares, Kennedy becomes jealous and tries to shoot Wilson, only to be killed by Escobar, who had snuck back to ensure that his enemies do not get the weapons.

Wilson and Escobar race to the coast and find the two barges bringing in the deadly cargo. They use some of Kennedy's goods to hold off the Regulares. Then the Regulares spot Escobar's rebels approaching and set up an ambush. Wilson fires at the barge carrying dynamite. The explosion devastates the hiding soldiers. The survivors flee. Wilson refuses Escobar's offer to join the rebellion and rides away to hopefully reunite with Lisa.

== Cast ==
- Robert Mitchum as Wilson
- Ursula Thiess as Lisa Kennedy
- Gilbert Roland as Colonel José Escobar
- Zachary Scott as Kennedy
- Rodolfo Acosta as Sebastian
- José Torvay as Gonzalez
- Henry Brandon as Gunther
- Douglas Fowley as McGhee
- Victor Junco as General Lorenzo
- Alfonso Sánchez Tello as General Brucero
- Arturo Manrique as Adolfo
- José Ángel Espinoza as Driver
- Margarito Luna as Santos
- Miguel Inclán as Priest
- José Muñoz as Man in Wagon
- Manuel Sánchez Navarro as Hotel Manager
- Antonio Sandoval as Indian Boy
- Alberto Pedret as Scout

== Production ==
The film was based on an original screen story by Earl Felton called Horse Opera. It was about an American movie company in the early 1900s who is captured by Pancho Villa. The hero was a soldier of fortune, the right hand man to Pancho Villa, who falls for the movie company's leading lady, rescues her from Villa, takes her to Hollywood and becomes a movie star. Producer Robert L Jacks liked it and set up the film at United Artists, with Robert Mitchum to star and Richard Fleischer to direct. Fleischer had worked with Felton several times but says the screenwriter wrote a script which diverted significantly from the original treatment, removing the movie company, the leading lady, Hollywood and Villa. Fleischer wanted to pull out of the project but United Artists were worried they would lose Mitchum and threatened to sue.

This film was shot on location in Mexico at Cuernavaca, Tepetlán, Palo Balero in Xochitepec, Yautepec de Zaragoza, Acapulco, Iguala and the Hotel Hacienda in Cocoyoc, Morelos.

== Reception ==
Fleischer wrote that the film "turned out to be quite a good, commercially successful picture. It has, however, absolutely nothing to do with the picture I started out to make."
