= Robin Hughes (actor) =

British actor (1920–1989)

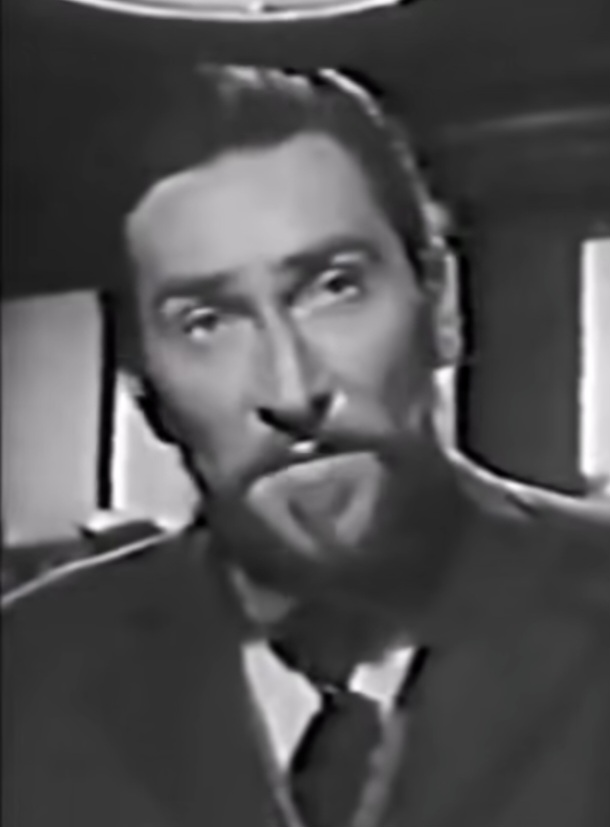
- Hughes in an episode of One Step Beyond (1961)
- Born: Robin Harold Hughes; 7 June 1920; Buenos Aires, Argentina
- Died: 10 December 1989 (aged 69); Los Angeles, California, U.S.
- Occupations: Film and television actor
- Years active: 1947–1971
- Spouse: Diane Therese Pitman (m. 1954–1962) Ursula Klara Binias (m. 1969–1980)
- Children: 3

Robin Hughes (7 June 1920 – 10 December 1989) was an Argentine-British film and television actor.

== Life and career ==
Robin Hughes was born on 7 June 1920 in Buenos Aires, Argentina, to English parents, Rosa Violet (Pitt) and Harold William Hughes. His father was head of the British Royal Wheat Commission, and Hughes spent his childhood moving from country to country as his father was transferred in government service; consequently, his early schooling was acquired in South America, Canada, Mozambique, East Africa and other places. At the age of 18, he joined the Royal Navy as a signalman and at the end of the Second World War, he left the service as lieutenant commander. Robin Hughes addressed in an episode of the 1950s' television programme One Step Beyond that he was supposed to be assigned to HMS Hood on the morning of 24 May 1941, when it sank under enemy attack by the German battleship Bismarck. Robin had received officer's papers, however, the day before Hood set to sea, and was sent to officer's training instead of boarding the ship with his mates. In the tragedy, 1,415 men died; only three survived...or, as Robin Hughes stated, "...four." He went to the United States in 1948 and appeared in many theatre, television and film roles. In 1958 he appeared as the amorous editor Brian O'Bannion in Auntie Mame opposite Rosalind Russell. That year he made two guest appearances on Perry Mason: first as murderer Addison Doyle in "The Case of the Green-Eyed Sister", then as Rodney Beaton in "The Case of the Buried Clock". He is also known for playing the title role (Satan) in The Twilight Zone episode "The Howling Man".

He died on 10 December 1989 in Los Angeles from liver disease. He was married to Diane Therese Pitman on June 26, 1954, until their divorce in 1962. They had two children, Evan Hughes and Kendrick Hughes. He then went on to marry Ursula Klara Binias on 26 April 1969, until their divorce on 26 June 1980. They had one child together.

== Career ==
=== Partial filmography ===
- Hue and Cry (1947) – Selwyn Pike
- Green Dolphin Street (1947) – Sailor (uncredited)
- Forever Amber (1947) – Benvolio (uncredited)
- If Winter Comes (1947) – A.R.P. Member (uncredited)
- Port Said (1948) – Bunny Beacham
- My Own True Love (1948) – English Officer (uncredited)
- Kiss the Blood Off My Hands (1948) – Policeman (uncredited)
- Command Decision (1948) – R.A.F. Officer (uncredited)
- Enchantment (1948) – Corporal
- Look for the Silver Lining (1949) – Lieutenant (uncredited)
- The Secret of St. Ives (1949) – Corporal (uncredited)
- Sword in the Desert (1949) – Soldier (uncredited)
- When Willie Comes Marching Home (1950) – Marine Officer (uncredited)
- Three Came Home (1950) – Australian POW (uncredited)
- The Flame and the Arrow (1950) – Skinner
- Fancy Pants (1950) – Cyril (uncredited)
- Cyrano de Bergerac (1950) – Cadet
- Kim (1950) – British Officer (uncredited)
- The 13th Letter (1951) – Intern (uncredited)
- Secrets of Monte Carlo (1951) – Charles Reeves
- Darling, How Could You! (1951) – George Neville (uncredited)
- The Desert Fox: The Story of Rommel (1951) – Medic (uncredited)
- The Son of Dr. Jekyll (1951) – Alec – Roommate (uncredited)
- Quo Vadis (1951) – Christ (voice, uncredited)
- Mutiny (1952) – Lt. Vaughan (uncredited)
- Million Dollar Mermaid (1952) – English Reporter (uncredited)
- Rogue's March (1953) – Captain Ashe (uncredited)
- Titanic (1953) – Junior Officer (uncredited)
- The Maze (1953) – Richard Roblar
- Flame of Calcutta (1953) – Lt. Bob Ramsey (uncredited)
- El Alaméin (1953) – Sgt. Alf Law
- Money from Home (1953) – Playfair – Hunt Club Ball Guest (uncredited)
- Charge of the Lancers (1954) – Soldier / Messenger (uncredited)
- Paris Playboys (1954) – Lestrade (uncredited)
- Dial M for Murder (1954) – Police Sergeant O'Brien
- King Richard and the Crusaders (1954) – King's Guard (uncredited)
- Khyber Patrol (1954) – Tall Major in Lounge
- Untamed (1955) – Man at Irish Ball (uncredited)
- The Scarlet Coat (1955) – Col. Tarleton (uncredited)
- The Court Jester (1955) – Black Fox's Man with Message (uncredited)
- The Mole People (1956) – First Officer
- Johnny Tremain (1957) – British Naval Officer (uncredited)
- Manhunt in the Jungle (1958) – Cmdr. George M. Dyott
- The Thing That Couldn't Die (1958) – Gideon Drew
- The Buccaneer (1958) – Lt. Rogers
- Auntie Mame (1958) – Brian O'Bannion
- Battle of the Coral Sea (1959) – Maj. Jammy Harris
- The Road to Hong Kong (1962) – American Official (uncredited)
- He Who Rides a Tiger (1965) – Det. Sgt. Crowley
- Star! (1968) – Third Hyde Park Speaker (uncredited)
- The Seven Minutes (1971) – Ashcroft (uncredited) (final film role)

=== Television ===
- The Bigelow Theatre (1 episode, 1951)
- Four Star Playhouse (1 episode, 1954) – Army Sergeant
- Cavalcade of America (2 episodes, 1954) – Lt. Col. Carleton
- Schlitz Playhouse of Stars (1 episode, 1954) – Sandstrom
- The Star and the Story (2 episodes, 1955–1956) – Count d'Alba / Tom Clark
- Crusader (1 episode, 1956) – Frank McKenna
- The Adventures of Wild Bill Hickok (1 episode, 1956) – Emerson Gilhaven
- You Are There (4 episodes, 1955–1956) – Cassius / British Official / Admiral Reginald Hall
- The Brothers (3 episodes, 1956–1957) – Barrington Steel
- Cheyenne (1 episode, 1957) – Capt.. Baylor
- The Gray Ghost (1 episode, 1958) – Andrews
- Zorro (4 episodes, 1958) – Esteban Rojas (uncredited)
- The Adventures of Jim Bowie (1 episode, 1958) – Vivian St. John
- Mickey Spillane's Mike Hammer (1 episode, 1958) – Mr. Carlyle
- Perry Mason (2 episodes, 1958) – Rodney Beaton / Addison Doyle
- Flight (1 episode)
- Markham (1 episode, 1959) – Charlie – Poet
- Sugarfoot (1 episode, 1959) – Dougal MacBrewster
- Westinghouse Desilu Playhouse (1 episode, 1959) – Gerald Lester
- Walt Disney's Wonderful World of Color (1 episode, 1960) – Hitchcock
- Hawaiian Eye (1 episode, 1960) – Bryan Semple
- Men into Space (1 episode, 1960) – Captain Tom Hetherford
- The Twilight Zone (1 episode, 1960) – Howling Man
- The Islanders (1 episode, 1960) – Colonel Arthur Munson
- Boris Karloff's Thriller (1 episode, 1961) – Collins ('A Terribly Strange Bed')
- 77 Sunset Strip (2 episodes, 1959–1961) – Nicky Bascombe / Mr. Sandby
- The Brothers Brannagan (1 episode, 1961) – Hilliary
- Alcoa Presents: One Step Beyond (1 episode, 1961) – Jake
- The Adventures of Sir Francis Drake (1 episode, 1962) – Adam Forrester
- The Saint (1 episode, 1962) – Harry Tiltman
- The Human Jungle (1 episode, 1963) – Sir Francis Leigh Brooke
- Ghost Squad (1 episode, 1963) – Dave Welford
- The Loner (1 episode, 1965) – Jamison Smithley Carruthers
- Garrison's Gorillas (1 episode, 1967) – Jonathan Brown
