= Order of Magellan =

Highest award by the Circumnavigators Club

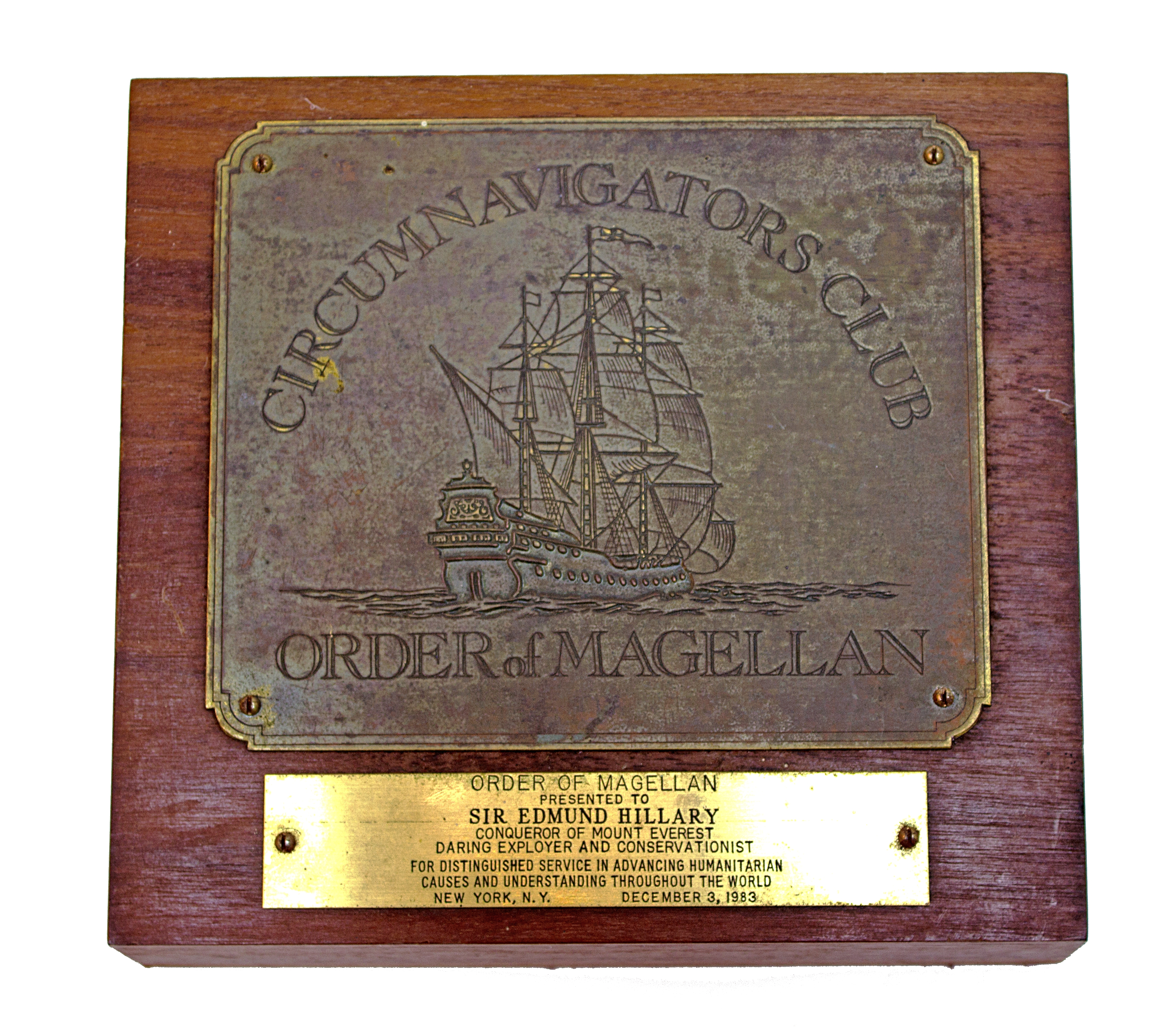
Order of Magellan awarded to Sir Edmund Hillary

The Order of Magellan is an honor bestowed on distinguished individuals who have circumnavigated the Earth and who, to the course of their career, have contributed to the world of science or the environment or future progress through peace and understanding. Among the pantheon of winners of this award are Douglas MacArthur, philanthropist and mountaineer Sir Edmund Hillary, ethnographer and adventurer Thor Heyerdahl, Dr. William Walsh, who started Project Hope, oceanographer and underwater archaeologist Dr. Robert Ballard, oceanographer Jacques-Yves Cousteau, and astronaut and United States Senator John Glenn. The Magellan Award is the highest award bestowed by the Circumnavigators Club, founded in 1902. The honor is named after the Portuguese born explorer, Ferdinand Magellan, who is widely known as the first captain to sail around the world—though he didn't complete the circumnavigation as he died during the voyage in the Philippines, that being the Spanish navigator Juan Sebastián Elcano, who took over command of the expedition after Magellan's death, and completed the trip.
