= The Americano (1955 film) =

1955 film by William Castle

- Theatrical release poster
- Directed by: William Castle
- Screenplay by: Guy Trosper
- Story by: Leslie T. White
- Produced by: Robert Stillman
- Starring: Glenn Ford
- Cinematography: William E. Snyder
- Edited by: Harry Marker
- Music by: Roy Webb
- Color process: Technicolor
- Production company: Robert Stillman Productions
- Distributed by: RKO Radio Pictures
- Release dates: January 19, 1955 (Premiere-New York City); January 29, 1955 (US)
- Running time: 85 minutes
- Country: United States
- Language: English
- Box office: $1.25 million (US/Canada rentals)

The Americano is a 1955 American Western film directed by William Castle and starring Glenn Ford.

== Plot ==
Texas rancher Sam Dent takes a small herd of three Brahman bulls to Brazil, where he sells them for a small fortune. There, he finds himself in the middle of a range war, as well as in love. Following this, he must find out who are his friends and who are his enemies.

== Cast ==
- Glenn Ford as Sam Dent
- Frank Lovejoy as Bento Hermany
- Cesar Romero as Manuel Silvera / "El Gato" / Etc.
- Ursula Thiess as Marianna
- Abbe Lane as Teresa
- Rodolfo Hoyos Jr. as Cristino
- Salvador Baguez as Captain Gonzalez
- Tom Powers as Jim Rogers
- Dan White as Barney Dent
- Frank Marlowe as Captain of Ship
- George Navarro as Tuba Masero
- Nyra Monsour as Tuba's Sister

== Production ==
The Americano began filming in July 1953 in São Paulo, Brazil. Budd Boetticher was initially the director and Clifford Stine the cinematographer. Due to bad weather in Brazil, production stopped in September 1953. Ford refused to return to film and was sued for $1.75 million for breach of contract. Filming recommenced in June 1954 with Boetticher replaced by William Castle and Stine replaced by William Snyder. Abbe Lane's musical number was supervised by her husband, Xavier Cugat.

== Reception ==
The New York Times found the film interesting but leisurely and predictable, with a heavy Hollywood Western feel despite the exotic setting.

== See also ==
- List of American films of 1955
