= George Keymas =

American actor

- Born: November 18, 1925
- Died: January 17, 2008 (aged 82)
- Occupation: Actor
- Years active: 1950–1977 (film)

George Keymas (November 18, 1925 – January 17, 2008) was an American film and television actor.

== Career ==
Keymas graduated from Springfield (Ohio) High School.

Keymas began his Hollywood career in 1950, mainly in Westerns. His first screen appearance was in an uncredited role in the 1950 B-feature film, I Shot Billy the Kid, with lead Don "Red" Barry. Keymas was cast in ethnic, often Native American characters, or cow-punching, at times ruthless, cowboys, in countless film and TV Westerns. He appeared on Have Gun - Will Travel Season 2, Episode 19: "The Monster" as Regaldo, which first aired on 1/14/1960.

He portrayed "the Leader" in The Twilight Zone episode "Eye of the Beholder", which originally aired November 11, 1960. His freakish, ambiguous character was seen throughout the episode on a futuristic big-screen monitor as background subplot to the story. In 1962, he played a murderer in "The Nancy Davis Story" on the TV Western Wagon Train.

Keymas's "Indian" roles came in many other popular TV Westerns series of the day, such as Daniel Boone, Death Valley Days, The High Chaparral, Gunsmoke, and Bonanza, among many others. Keymas retired in 1977.

== Selected filmography ==
- I Shot Billy the Kid (1950) – Murphy's Man (uncredited)
- Border Rangers (1950) – Raker, Henchman
- Mask of the Avenger (1951) – Austrian Soldier (uncredited)
- Actors and Sin (1952) (segment "Woman of Sin") – Producer
- The Miracle of Our Lady of Fatima (1952) – Prisoner (uncredited)
- Salome (1953) – Sailor (uncredited)
- Siren of Bagdad (1953) – Soradin
- Flame of Calcutta (1953) – Prince Jehan
- The Robe (1953) – Slave (uncredited)
- The Great Adventures of Captain Kidd (1953, Serial) – Sailor in the Argus brig (uncredited)
- King of the Khyber Rifles (1953) – Afridi Horseman (uncredited)
- Bait (1954) – Chuck
- Drums of Tahiti (1954) – Angelo
- The Raid (1954) – Captain Dupree (uncredited)
- The Black Dakotas (1954) – Spotted Deer (uncredited)
- They Rode West (1954) – Torquay (uncredited)
- The Bamboo Prison (1954) – Spiros Metaxas (uncredited)
- The Prodigal (1955) – Scribe (uncredited)
- Stranger on Horseback (1955) – Bannerman's Henchman
- Wyoming Renegades (1955) – George Curry
- Kentucky Rifle (1955) – Interpreter
- Santa Fe Passage (1955) – Chief Satank
- Apache Ambush (1955) – Tweedy
- The Vanishing American (1955) – Coshanta
- Kismet (1955) – Young Policeman (uncredited)
- Fury at Gunsight Pass (1956) – Daley
- The Maverick Queen (1956) – Muncie
- Walk the Proud Land (1956) – Ponce (uncredited)
- Thunder Over Arizona (1956) – Harvard 'Shotgun' Kelly
- The White Squaw (1956) – Yotah
- Utah Blaine (1957) – Rink Witter
- The Storm Rider (1957) – Apache Kid
- Apache Warrior (1957) – Chato
- Plunder Road (1957) – Officer No. 1 (uncredited)
- Gunfire at Indian Gap (1957) – Scully
- Cole Younger, Gunfighter (1958) – Sergeant Price, State Police
- Gunsmoke in Tucson (1958) – Hondo
- Death Valley Days (1960) – Toguima, Episode: Mission to the Mountains
- Studs Lonigan (1960) – Gangster (uncredited)
- Lonely Are the Brave (1962) – Deputy (uncredited)
- He Rides Tall (1964) – Ed Harney (uncredited)
- Arizona Raiders (1965) – Montana
- Beau Geste (1966) – Platoon Sergeant
- Journey to Shiloh (1968) – Crooked Gambler (uncredited)
- The Other Side of Midnight (1977) – Dr. K

== Television ==
Year	Title	Role	Notes
1959	Alfred Hitchcock Presents	Paul	Season 5 Episode 12: "Specialty of the House"
1961	Rawhide	Siko	S3:E22, "Incident in the Middle of Nowhere"
1964	Gunsmoke	Harry Crane	Episode: "Run, Sheep, Run" (S10E16)

== Bibliography ==
- Martin, Len. The Republic Pictures Checklist: Features, Serials, Cartoons, Short Subjects and Training Films of Republic Pictures Corporation, 1935–1959. McFarland.
