= Sangaree (film) =

1953 film by Edward Ludwig

- Directed by: Edward Ludwig
- Written by: David Duncan; Frank L. Moss
- Based on: novel by Frank Slaughter
- Produced by: William H. Pine; William C. Thomas
- Starring: Fernando Lamas; Arlene Dahl; Patricia Medina
- Cinematography: Lionel Lindon
- Edited by: Howard Smith
- Music by: Lucien Cailliet
- Production company: Pine-Thomas Productions
- Distributed by: Paramount Pictures
- Release date: May 27, 1953
- Running time: 94 minutes
- Country: United States
- Language: English
- Box office: $1.8 million (US)

Sangaree is a 1953 American 3-D color period costume drama film by director Edward Ludwig. It was adapted from the 1948 novel of the same name by Frank G. Slaughter.

The film stars Fernando Lamas and Arlene Dahl. The film is set during the American Revolution and focuses on an indentured servant, Dr. Carlos Morales, who rises to power in the state of Georgia. It was Paramount's first 3-Dimensional film release.

== Plot ==
On his death bed, old Revolutionary War general Darby bequeaths his Georgia estate, Sangaree, to a man he trusts, Dr. Carlos Morales, requesting that he seek freedom for servants and slaves.

The general's son Roy has no objection, but knows his sister Nancy is determined to keep Sangaree in the family. She and her fiancé, attorney Harvey Bristol, make it clear to Morales that he will have a fight on his hands.

Roy's wife, Martha, is secretly still in love with Morales, an old beau. Martha spreads the word that Nancy is in league with Felix Pagnol, a French pirate who is making raids off the Savannah coast. A plague outbreak also concerns Morales, who is running a free clinic.

Morales learns that Bristol has a business partnership with Pagnol the pirate and that Martha, not Nancy, is involved.

Bristol's warehouse, where the stolen goods are being kept, is the source of the plague so Morales burns it to the ground.

Martha contracts the plague and dies after shooting Bristol. Nancy joins forces with Morales to live together at Sangaree.

== Cast ==
=== Billed ===
- Fernando Lamas as Dr. Carlos Morales
- Arlene Dahl as Nancy Darby
- Patricia Medina as Martha Darby
- Francis L. Sullivan as Dr. Bristol
- Charles Korvin as Felix Pagnol
- Tom Drake as Dr. Roy Darby
- John Sutton as Harvey Bristol
- Willard Parker as Gabriel Thatch
- Charles Evans as Judge Armstrong
- Lester Matthews as Gen. Victor Darby
- Roy Gordon as Dr. Tyrus
- Lewis L. Russell as Capt. Bronson
- Russell Gaige as McIntosh
- William Walker as Priam
- Felix Nelson as Billy
- Voltaire Perkins as Crowther

=== Unbilled ===
- Franklyn Farnum as Member of Medical Board
- Paul Newlan as Member of Medical Board (uncredited)
- Jack Shea as Saloon Patron (uncredited)
- Kenner G. Kemp as Saloon Patron (uncredited)
- Bill Raisch as Saloon Patron (uncredited)
- Walter Reed as Conspirator in Boat (uncredited)
- Jeffrey Sayre as Party Extra (uncredited)
- Emile Meyer as Angry Townsman (uncredited)
- Don Megowan as River Pirate (uncredited)
- Ethan Laidlaw as Bristol's Warehouse Guard (uncredited)
- Sam McDaniel as Nancy's Coachman (uncredited)

== Production ==
The film was based on the novel by Frank G. Slaughter, which was published in 1948. Slaughter was a doctor turned novelist who specialised in historical fiction.

Pine-Thomas Productions purchased the film rights in March 1952. In June they hired Edward Ludwig to direct this and The Rebel. (The latter would not be made.)

By November Arlene Dahl was set as the female lead and Pine and Thomas were trying to get Tyrone Power for the male star. Eventually Fernando Lamas was borrowed from MGM.

Filming started 17 January 1953. Filming took place for ten days when Paramount chairman Adolph Zukor decided to halt, and start again in 3-D. The new technique involved a deal of adjustment.

"It was rather like doing a stage play," said Patricia Medina.

Paramount later decided to make Red Garters in 3-D.

It was the first of two films which Arlene Dahl and Fernando Lamas starred together. They also appeared in The Diamond Queen released the same year. They were married from 1954 to 1960.

David Duncan, who worked on the script, recalls visiting the set during filming. He noticed a sign which said "George Washington for President" and asked producer Bill Thomas to take it down as Washington did not become president until years after the film was set. Thomas halted production to do this but was upset when he discovered the sign would have been out of shot and was only put up as a joke.

== Reception ==
In February 1953 Paramount estimated the film would earn $1.5 million as a 3-D film and $500,000 as a 2-D film.

Variety estimated the film earned $1.8 million at the North American box office during its first year of release.

The film earned between $150,000 to $300,000 in France.

== See also ==
- List of films about the American Revolution
