= Sujata and Asoka =

Sujata and Asoka in traditional dresses

Sujata and Asoka were a pair of dancers specialising in performing Indian, Tibetan and various Oriental dances to Western audiences. They were Sujata, (3 February 1918 in Bombay, British Raj – 2 January 1993 in Coconino County, Arizona) and Asoka Rubener (26 October 1910 in German Empire – 7 June 1997 in Yavapai County, Arizona).

== Background ==
Asoka studied dance in Europe under Harald Kreutzberg and later in Asia, eventually becoming a Buddhist. In 1939 whilst in India, in the Himalayas he was interned as an enemy alien by the British authorities from 1939 to 1944.

Sujata, a Christian, was born in Bombay and as a child moved with her family to the south of India. She began studying dance at the age of 10, eventually becoming a solo dancer. Sujata met her husband when they were both dancing in Mussoori, Dehradun district, in 1946; the two were married in 1947.

They made their first performance in the West in Paris, then made appearances in New York City and Montreal.

In addition to their dancing performances, the two appeared in several Hollywood films and acted as technical advisers. Their final film appearance was together in Juliet of the Spirits (1965). They became American citizens in 1955.

Following their retirement, they taught dance in Sedona, Arizona.

== Filmography ==
=== Sujata roles ===
- Aladdin and His Lamp (1952) – Dancing Slave
- The Merry Widow (1952) – Gypsy Girl
- Caribbean Gold (1952) – Dancer in duet #1
- Fair Wind to Java (1953) – Dancer
- Desert Legion (1953) – Dancer #1
- Salome (1953) – Oriental Dancer
- Flame of Calcutta (1953) – Exotic Dancer #1
- The Diamond Queen (1953) – Oriental Dancer #1
- King of the Khyber Rifles (1953) – Native Dancer
- Bengal Brigade (1954) – Indian Dancer #1
- I pirati della Malesia (1964) – Dancer #1
- Juliet of the Spirits (1965) – Bhisma's helper #2
- Tum Haseen Main Jawan (1970)
- Sharmeelee (1971)
- Do Yaar (1972)
- Phir Kab Milogi (1974)
- Maya Miriga (1984) – Tutu's Wife (final film role)

=== Asoka roles ===
- Caribbean Gold (1952) – Dancer in duet #2
- Desert Legion (1953) – Dancer #2
- Flame of Calcutta (1953) – Exotic Dancer #2
- Salome (1953) – Oriental Dancer
- The Diamond Queen (1953) – Oriental Dancer #2
- Bengal Brigade (1954) – Indian Dancer #2
- I pirati della Malesia (1964) – Dancer #2
- Juliet of the Spirits (1965) – Bhisma's helper #1
