= Southern Yankee =

Southern Yankee may refer to:

- A Southern Yankee, a 1948 film
- Southern Unionist, someone from the American South who opposed secession
