= Here Come the Girls (1953 film) =

1953 film by Claude Binyon

- 1953 Theatrical Poster
- Directed by: Claude Binyon
- Written by: Edmund L. Hartmann
- Produced by: Paul Jones
- Starring: Bob Hope; Tony Martin; Arlene Dahl; Rosemary Clooney
- Cinematography: Lionel Lindon
- Edited by: Arthur P. Schmidt
- Production company: Hope Productions
- Distributed by: Paramount Pictures
- Release dates: Los Angeles and New York openings: October 22, 1953
- Running time: multiple edits; 77-78, 86 or 100 minutes
- Country: United States
- Language: English
- Box office: $2 million (US)

Here Come the Girls is a 1953 musical comedy film directed by Claude Binyon, filmed in Technicolor, produced by Bob Hope's company Hope Productions Inc., and released by Paramount Pictures.

Along with Hope, the cast includes Rosemary Clooney, Tony Martin and Arlene Dahl.

== Plot ==
At the turn of the century, having spent nearly 20 years trying to make it in show business, Stanley Snodgrass is still nothing more than a glorified chorus boy. Inept as ever, he causes an accident during a show that leads to co-stars Irene Bailey and Allen Trent taking a spill on stage.

Over the objections of co-star Daisy Crockett, who loves him, Stanley is fired by Harry Fraser, the show's producer. Stanley returns home, where he still lives with his mother Emily, and stepfather Albert, who works in the coal business and has been financing Stanley's show-biz ambitions. A fed-up Albert demands that Stanley find a real job.

"Jack the Slasher" is a mysterious murderer, with a past romance with Irene. He sends her a threatening note and then stabs Allen, wounding him, jealously believing Allen to be her lover. Irene is able to identify a photo of Jack—whom she knew as Jack Bennett—to a police detective, Dennis Logan. It is proposed that Allen offer himself as bait to bring Jack out of hiding, but when Allen declines, an unsuspecting Stanley is offered $100 a week and a room at the Waldorf to rejoin the show, this time as the co star to Irene Bailey.

Irene pretends to be in love with Stanley, who arrogantly gives Daisy the brush. Logan poses as his new valet and knocks out Jack, who, disguised as a barber, intends to cut Stanley's throat. Jack is arrested and Stanley is once again fired. He takes a job in Albert's coal business, quickly making a mess of things there.

Jack escapes jail. Harry again rehires Stanley, who still is clueless and believes Irene wants him. Daisy overhears the scheme. She warns Stanley, who accuses her of being jealous. On stage during an "Ali Baba" routine, Stanley narrowly misses being killed by Jack, who throws knives from the balcony. Jack disguises himself and joins the act, stabbing Stanley with a knife he's picked up backstage. Stanley is so dim, he doesn't realize it was a harmless prop knife until Daisy tells him. They marry and live happily ever after, although Stanley's incompetence on stage continues to infuriate Harry.

== Cast ==
- Bob Hope as Stanley Snodgrass
- Tony Martin as Allen Trent
- Arlene Dahl as Irene Bailey
- Rosemary Clooney as Daisy Crockett
- Millard Mitchell as Albert Snodgrass
- William Demarest as Dennis Logan
- Fred Clark as Harry Fraser
- Robert Strauss as Jack the Slasher
- Zamah Cunningham as Mrs. Emily Snodgrass
- Frank Orth as Mr. Hungerford
- The Four Step Brothers as Dance Specialty
- Emory Parnell as Police Capt. Garrity
- Jeanne Carmen as Missouri Chorine
- Johnny Downs as Bob (uncredited)

== Production notes ==
The working titles of this film were Girls Are Here to Stay and Champagne for Everybody.

Sources conflict about the film's running time. Copyright records list the running time as 100 minutes, or 12 reels, while the Hollywood Reporter review gives the length as 86 minutes and other reviews list it as 77 to 78 minutes. The viewed print ran approximately 77 minutes.
