= Jamaica Run =

1953 adventure-drama film by Lewis R. Foster

- Film poster
- Directed by: Lewis R. Foster
- Screenplay by: Lewis R. Foster
- Based on: The Neat Little Corpse by Max Murray
- Produced by: William H. Pine; William C. Thomas
- Starring: Ray Milland; Arlene Dahl; Wendell Corey
- Cinematography: Lionel Lindon
- Edited by: Howard A. Smith
- Music by: Lucien Cailliet
- Color process: Technicolor
- Production company: Clarion Productions
- Distributed by: Paramount Pictures
- Release date: April 22, 1953
- Running time: 92 minutes
- Country: United States
- Language: English

Jamaica Run is a 1953 American Technicolor adventure drama film directed by Lewis R. Foster and starred Ray Milland, Arlene Dahl and Wendell Corey. Much of the personnel in this movie worked on the previous year's Caribbean Gold. The plot concerns ownership of an old estate set on the island in the Caribbean.

== Plot ==
Pat Fairlie is out of the Navy now and travels to Jamaica to renew acquaintance with Ena Dacey, an old flame. Ena lives on a stately sugar plantation with her brother, Todd, and their mother. Land baron Montague comes to collect the rent. The mother speaks arrogantly about the family's wealth. In reality, the Daceys have financial woes, but pay a mere one pound per year to lease the place, due to a long-ago bargain made after documents proving the rightful owner's purchase were lost at sea.

Montague comes to Pat with a proposition. He believes the chest containing the documents can be recovered from the ocean floor and wants Pat to be his diver. Janice and Robert Clayton have put in claims to Montague that the property should be legally theirs. Pat refuses to help, but Montague explains that some other diver will, so Pat might as well be there to look out for his Ena's family interests. Mysterious events begin to occur. Todd appears to fall in love with Janice, but when she nearly drowns until Pat rescues her, Todd's behavior seems suspicious. Robert is then found by Pat, dead on the ocean floor. Inspector Mole of the island police arrives to investigate and soon concludes it's not an accident but a murder.

A treasure chest is found, presumably containing the vital documents. After an attempt on Pat's life, he and Ena do some investigative work on their own. They find an antique dealer who recently sold such a chest to a customer.

Montague is identified as the culprit, trying to pull an elaborate land swindle using forged documents. He is arrested for Robert's murder, while the others must rush to save the plantation after the delusional Mrs. Dacey sets fire to it.

== Cast ==
- Ray Milland as Patrick Fairlie
- Arlene Dahl as Ena Dacey
- Wendell Corey as Todd Dacey
- Patric Knowles as William Montague
- Kasey Rogers as Janice Clayton
- Carroll McComas as Mrs. Dacey
- William Walker as Human
- Murray Matheson as Inspector Mole
- Clarence Muse as Mose
- Michael Moore as Robert Clayton
- Rex Evans as Judge Henry
- Robert Warwick as Court Judge
- Lester Matthews as Judge
- Leonard Mudie as Dr. Spaddons
- Davis Roberts as Rob
- Roy Glenn as Court Announcer

== Production ==
The film was based on a 1950 novel, The Neat Little Corpse by Max Murray, which was originally published as a magazine serial. The New York Times called it "highly agreeable".

Film rights were bought by Pine-Thomas Productions who announced it as a vehicle for Arlene Dahl in January 1952. Lewis Foster was given the job of directing and writing the script. In March Ray Milland signed to co star. The following month Wendell Corey agreed to do the film.

Ray Milland had a contract to make one film a year with Paramount (who released Pine-Thomas films). He was wanted by producer Harold Popkin to make The Thief but Paramount insisted he make Jamaica Run under their contract instead. The impasse was resolved by the intervention of Milland's agents at MCA and filming for Jamaica Run was pushed back. Filming started 1 May 1953.

Pine-Thomas made the film as a "Clarion" Production, a company they sometimes used for their more expensive films.
