= Lionel Lindon =

American cinematographer

- Born: September 2, 1905; San Francisco, California, U.S.
- Died: September 20, 1971 (aged 66); Los Angeles, California, U.S.
- Occupation: Cinematographer
- Parent: Verna Willis

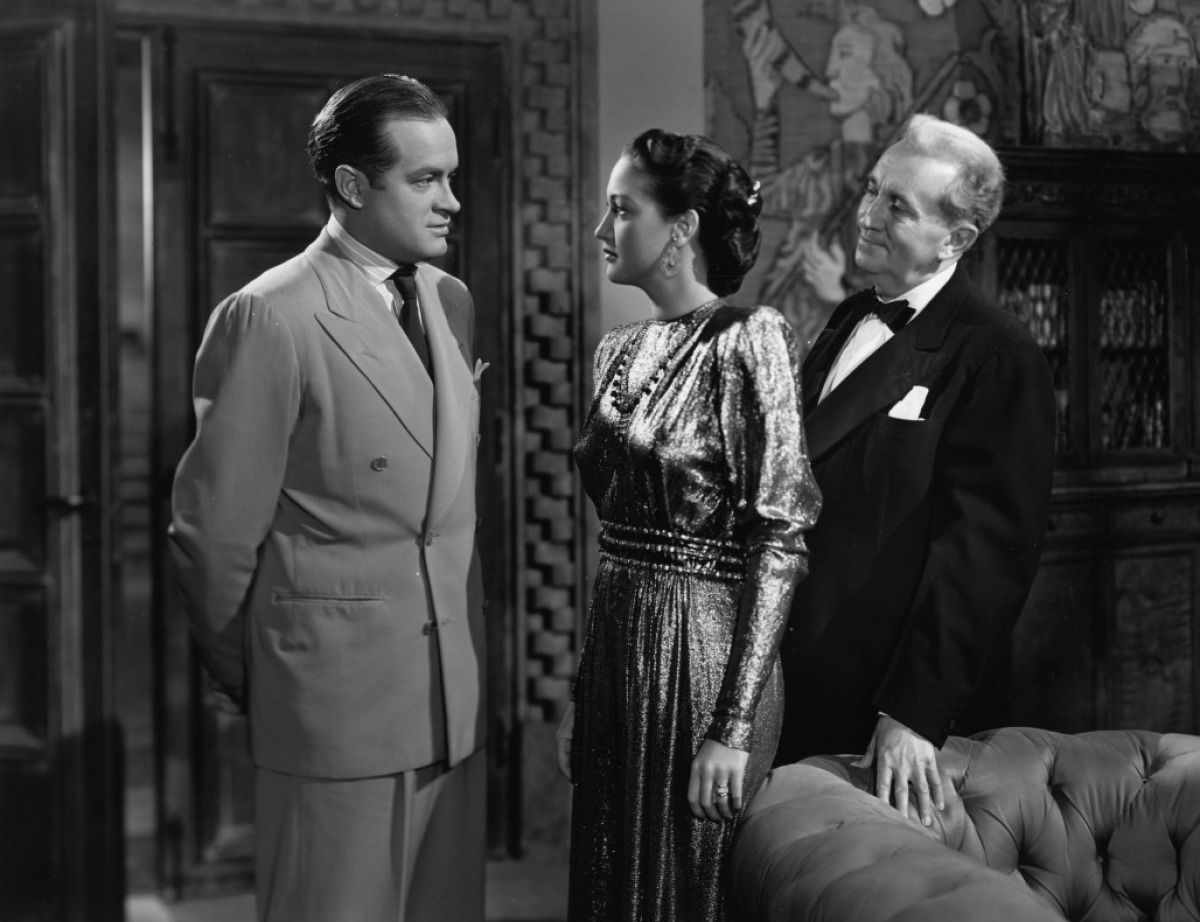
My Favorite Brunette (1947) 1.jpg

Lionel Lindon, ASC (September 2, 1905 – September 20, 1971) was an American film cameraman and cinematographer who spent much of his career working for Paramount.

In 1950, he went freelance and began to work in television as well as film, continuing to work until the year of his death. He was three times nominated for an Academy Award for Best Cinematography and in 1956 was the winner of the award for color for Around the World in 80 Days.

== Life ==
Lionel—son of film editor Verna Willis and nephew to Set Director, Edwin B. Willis, —was a native of San Francisco. Soon after leaving school, Lindon got a job as a general assistant at Paramount Pictures and joined the camera department. Through the Roaring Twenties, he worked as a camera assistant and as a "foreign negative cameraman", in 1930 becoming a cameraman. In 1943, he made his debut as a director of photography and went on to serve in that capacity in some 66 American films, including Westerns. In 1950 he went freelance, which did not prevent him from working for Paramount on occasions. His final three films appeared in 1969.

The major names he worked with include John Frankenheimer, Frank Sinatra, Laurence Harvey, Edward Ludwig, Arlene Dahl, George Marshall, Alan Ladd, Veronica Lake, and Dorothy Lamour. Lindon received three Oscar nominations for best cinematographer, one of which led to the award. Lindon also worked in television between 1953 and 1971, contributing to 39 television series, including Alfred Hitchcock Presents, and eight TV movies.

He died in the Los Angeles suburb of Van Nuys on September 20, 1971.

== Filmography ==
=== Cinema ===
- 1943: Let's Face It!, Sidney Lanfield
- 1944: Going My Way, Leo McCarey
- 1945: Masquerade in Mexico, Mitchell Leisen
- 1945: Ed Gardner's Duffy's Tavern, Hal Walker
- 1945: A Medal for Benny, Irving Pichel
- 1946: The Blue Dahlia, George Marshall
- 1946: Road to Utopia, Hal Walker
- 1946: O.S.S., Irving Pichel
- 1946: Monsieur Beaucaire, George Marshall
- 1947: My Favorite Brunette, Elliott Nugent
- 1947: Welcome Stranger, Elliott Nugent
- 1947: Variety Girl, George Marshall
- 1947: The Trouble with Women, Sidney Lanfield
- 1948: The Sainted Sisters, William D. Russell
- 1948: Tap Roots, George Marshall
- 1948: Isn't It Romantic, Norman Z. McLeod
- 1949: Alias Nick Beal, John Farrow
- 1950: Destination Moon, Irving Pichel
- 1950: Quicksand, Irving Pichel
- 1950: The Great Rupert, Irving Pichel
- 1950: The Sun Sets at Dawn, Paul Sloane
- 1950: Prehistoric Women, Gregg C. Tallas
- 1951: Only the Valiant, Gordon Douglas
- 1951: Submarine Command, John Farrow
- 1951: Rhubarb, Arthur Lubin
- 1951: Drums in the Deep South, William Cameron Menzies
- 1952: The Turning Point, William Dieterle
- 1952: Japanese War Bride, King Vidor
- 1952: Caribbean Gold, also called Caribbean, Edward Ludwig
- 1952: The Blazing Forest, Edward Ludwig
- 1953: The Vanquished, Edward Ludwig
- 1953: Tropic Zone, Lewis R. Foster
- 1953: Jamaica Run, Lewis R. Foster
- 1953: The Stars Are Singing, Norman Taurog
- 1953: Sangaree, Edward Ludwig
- 1954: Secret of the Incas, Jerry Hopper
- 1954: Casanova's Big Night, Norman Z. McLeod
- 1954: Jivaro, Edward Ludwig
- 1955: Lucy Gallant, Robert Parrish
- 1955: Conquest of Space, Byron Haskin
- 1956: Around the World in 80 Days, Michael Anderson
- 1956: The Scarlet Hour, Michael Curtiz
- 1957: The Lonely Man, Henry Levin
- 1957: The Black Scorpion, Edward Ludwig
- 1958: I Want to Live!, Robert Wise
- 1959: Alias Jesse James, Norman Z. McLeod
- 1961: The Young Savages, John Frankenheimer
- 1961: Too Late Blues, John Cassavetes
- 1962: All Fall Down, John Frankenheimer
- 1962: The Manchurian Candidate, John Frankenheimer
- 1966: The Trouble with Angels, Ida Lupino
- 1966: Boy, Did I Get a Wrong Number!, George Marshall
- 1966: Grand Prix, John Frankenheimer
- 1966: Dead Heat on a Merry-Go-Round, Bernard Girard
- 1969: The Extraordinary Seaman, John Frankenheimer
- 1969: Pendulum, George Schaefer

=== Television movies ===
- 1964: See How They Run, David Lowell Rich
- 1967: The Meanest Men in the West, Charles S. Dubin and Samuel Fuller
- 1970: The Movie Murderer, Boris Sagal
- 1970: Ritual of Evil, Robert Day
- 1971: Do You Take This Stranger?, Richard T. Heffron
- 1971: Vanished, Buzz Kulik

== Nominations and awards ==
- Academy Award for Best Cinematography :
  - 1944, black and white, for Going My Way (nominated)
  - 1956, color, for Around the World in 80 Days (winner)
  - 1958, black and white, for I Want to Live! (nominated)
