= No Questions Asked (film) =

1951 film by Harold F. Kress

- Theatrical release poster
- Directed by: Harold F. Kress
- Screenplay by: Sidney Sheldon
- Story by: Berne Giler
- Produced by: Nicholas Nayfack
- Starring: Barry Sullivan; Arlene Dahl; George Murphy; Jean Hagen
- Cinematography: Harold Lipstein
- Edited by: Joseph Dervin
- Music by: Leith Stevens
- Production company: Metro-Goldwyn-Mayer
- Distributed by: Metro-Goldwyn-Mayer
- Release date: August 9, 1951 (New York)
- Running time: 81 minutes
- Country: United States
- Language: English
- Budget: $742,000
- Box office: $656,000

No Questions Asked is a 1951 American crime film noir directed by Harold F. Kress and starring Barry Sullivan, Arlene Dahl, George Murphy and Jean Hagen. The screenplay was written by Sidney Sheldon from a story by Berne Giler.

== Plot ==
Ellen Jessman returns from a skiing vacation and Steve Keiver is awaiting her at the airport in his pal Harry's taxi. Keiver wants to marry Ellen, but as an insurance investigator, he makes little money. Keiver's boss Manston cannot extend him a raise but mentions how the recovery of some stolen furs would save the company from paying a $10,000 claim. Keiver approaches known mobsters to explain the proposal. He strikes a deal and receives a $2,500 bonus from his boss. However, when he tries to bring Ellen a diamond ring, he learns that she has left town, having married a wealthy man while on vacation.

Keiver is embittered and continues to strike deals with criminals for returned stolen merchandise, with no questions asked. His efforts bring him a great deal of money, and he begins dating colleague Joan Brenson, who has always been attracted to him. However, he still carries a torch for Ellen, and when she returns, he tries to regain her affection now that he is rich.

The police resent Keiver's activities, as his activities, while legal, are close to the edge. Inspector Duggan assigns detective Walter O'Bannion to the case. In a lounge during intermission at a Broadway show, two perpetrators appearing to be women rob all of the ladies of their jewelry and flee. Outside the theater, the thieves remove their wigs and reveal themselves to be men.

Joan, brokenhearted that Keiver has returned to Ellen, delivers a message to him from Harry indicating the location of the stolen jewels. Franko, a mobster who swims in a pool for exercise, has them, but Keiver is double-crossed. Knocked unconscious with the jewels removed from him, Keiver suspects either Joan or Harry of betraying him, but it was actually Ellen and her husband Gordon, who have the jewels and are after the money.

Franko tortures Ellen to extract the information. He then murders both Ellen and Gordon and fights with Keiver underwater in a pool. Franko subdues Keiver, but when Franko surfaces, Duggan and other armed cops are awaiting him. Keiver is pulled from the pool and survives, and Joan is still in love with him.

== Cast ==
- Barry Sullivan as Steve Keiver
- Arlene Dahl as Ellen Sayburn Jessman
- George Murphy as Police Insp. Matt Duggan
- Jean Hagen as Joan Brenson
- Richard Anderson as Detective Walter O'Bannion
- Moroni Olsen as Henry Manston
- Danny Dayton as Harry Dycker (as Dan Dayton)
- Dick Simmons as Gordon N. Jessman
- Howard Petrie as Franko
- William Phipps as Roger
- William Reynolds as Floyd (as William Regnolds)
- Mauritz Hugo as Marty Callbert
- Mari Blanchard as Natalie
- Robert Sheppard as Detective Eddie
- Michael Dugan as Detective Howard
- Howland Chamberlain as Beebe (as Howland Chamberlin)
- Richard Bartlett as Betz
- Robert Osterloh as Owney

== Reception ==
In a contemporary review for The New York Times, critic A. H. Weiler wrote: "The question naturally arises whether the studio this time has discovered something new in the way of depicting the vagaries of outlawry. Well, to be charitable about it, there are a few interesting gimmicks here and there, but, by and large, all that it adds up to is that crime does not pay. And if the movie-goer has not seen this illustrated, as it is in 'No Questions Asked,' then he deserves to see it again."

According to MGM records, the film earned $483,000 in the U.S. and Canada and $173,000 elsewhere, resulting in a loss of $377,000.
