= Juliet of the Spirits =

1965 film by Federico Fellini

- Italian theatrical release poster
- Italian: Giulietta degli spiriti
- Directed by: Federico Fellini
- Screenplay by: Federico Fellini; Tullio Pinelli; Ennio Flaiano; Brunello Rondi
- Story by: Federico Fellini; Tullio Pinelli
- Produced by: Angelo Rizzoli; Clemente Fracassi; Henry Deutschmeister
- Starring: Giulietta Masina; Sandra Milo; Mario Pisu; Valentina Cortese
- Cinematography: Gianni Di Venanzo
- Edited by: Ruggero Mastroianni
- Music by: Nino Rota
- Production companies: Federiz; Francoriz Production
- Distributed by: Cineriz (Italy); Inter France Distribution (France)
- Release dates: 22 October 1965 (France); 23 October 1965 (Italy)
- Running time: 145 minutes
- Countries: Italy; France
- Language: Italian

Juliet of the Spirits (Italian: Giulietta degli spiriti) is a 1965 fantasy comedy-drama film directed by Federico Fellini and starring Giulietta Masina, Sandra Milo, Mario Pisu, Valentina Cortese, and Valeska Gert. The film is about the visions, memories, and mysticism that help a middle-aged woman find the strength to leave her philandering husband. The film uses "caricatural types and dream situations to represent a psychic landscape". It was Fellini's first feature-length color film, but followed his use of color in "The Temptation of Doctor Antonio" episode in the portmanteau film, Boccaccio '70 (1962).

The film was shown in competition at the 26th Venice International Film Festival; and received Academy Award nominations for Best Costume Design and Best Set Decoration. It won the 1966 Golden Globe Award for Best Foreign Language Film, and Giulietta Masina won a David di Donatello for her performance. Woody Allen loosely remade it with his 1990 film Alice.

== Plot ==
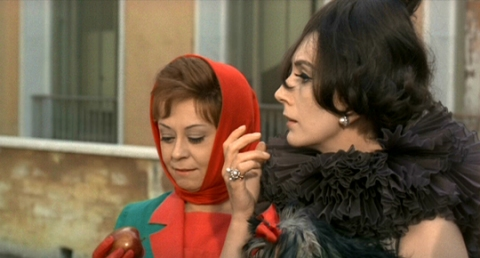
Giulietta Masina (left) and Valentina Cortese (right)

Giulietta Boldrini, an upper-class housewife, attempts to deal with her mundane life and philandering, oppressive husband, Giorgio, by exploring the odd lifestyle of a glamorous neighbour, Suzy, as well as through dreams, visions and fantasies. As she taps into her desires (and her demons) she slowly gains greater self-awareness, leading to independence, although, according to Masina (Fellini's wife), the ending's meaning is debatable.

== Cast ==
- Giulietta Masina as Giulietta Boldrini
  - Alba Cancellieri as Giulietta as a child
- Sandra Milo as Suzy / Iris / Fanny
- Mario Pisu as Giorgio Boldrini
- Valentina Cortese as Valentina
- Valeska Gert as Pijma
- José De Villalonga as José
- Friedrich von Ledebur as headmaster / saint
- Caterina Boratto as Giulietta's mother
- Lou Gilbert as Giulietta's grandfather
- Luisa Della Noce as Adele
- Silvana Jachino as Dolores
- Milena Vukotic as Elisabeta
- Sylva Koscina as Sylva
- Elena Fondra as Elena
- Dany París as desperate friend
- Anne Francine as psychodramatist
- George Ardisson as Dolores' model
- Eugenio Mastropietro as medium
- Elisabetta Gray as Teresina
- Alberto Plebani as Lynx-Eyes
- Yvonne Casadei as Susy's maid
- Mario Conocchia as lawyer
- Fred Williams and Federico Valli as Lynx-Eyes' agents
- Sabrina Di Sepio as granddaughter
- Asoka Rubener and Sujata Rubener as Bhisma's helpers
- Mary Arden as woman on TV
- Jacques Herlin as Frenchman
- Lea Lander as party guest
- Carlo Pisacane as friar
- Marilù Tolo as TV presenter
- Robert Wolders as party corpse
- Dakar as man on barge

== Production ==
Juliet of the Spirits was shot on location in Fregene, and at Safa-Palatino and Cinecittà Studios in Rome.

Fellini's longtime musical collaborator Nino Rota composed the soundtrack. Until his death in 1979, Rota wrote the music for every Fellini film except his directorial debut, Variety Lights. The music in Juliet of the Spirits contains circus themes, as in Fellini's 8½, and also uses organ, cocktail piano, guitar, saxophones, and voices without words to convey Juliet's shifts in feeling.

== Reception ==
On the review aggregator website Rotten Tomatoes, the film holds an approval rating of 79% based on 29 reviews, with an average rating of 7.3/10. On Metacritic, which assigns a normalized rating to reviews, the film's re-release has a weighted average score of 83 out of 100, based on 9 critics, indicating "universal acclaim".

In The New York Times, Stephen Holden wrote of a revival in 2001: "Fellini went deliriously and brilliantly bananas with the color to create a rollicking through-the-looking-glass series of tableaus evoking a woman's troubled psyche." Roger Ebert gave the film four stars out of four and included it in his 2001 list of "The Great Movies". Kevin Thomas of the Los Angeles Times praised the film, writing, "Federico Fellini's 1965 Juliet of the Spirits remains a timeless, major work of a master, a portrait of a dutiful wife plunged into crisis that triggers her spiritual awakening. With Fellini's own wife, the great Giulietta Masina, as Juliet, and with his unique command of fantasy and spectacle in full force, Juliet of the Spirits, Fellini's first film in color, is at once an eye-popping display of bravura and a work of compassionate insight."

The film was less well received in Italy. Giovanni Grazzini of Corriere della Sera wrote, "It is known that Fellini's imagination, in recent years, has been unrestrained by a taste conventionally called baroque: ornamental delirium, decorative bliss. Juliet's marital crisis is thus suffocated by the scenographic luxury, the clamor or the tenderness of the colors, the bizarre splendor of the costumes; although sometimes there is an authentic heartbeat of humanity."

== Awards and nominations ==
Institution	Category	Nominee(s)	Result
Academy Award	Best Costume Design	Piero Gherardi	Nominated
Academy Award	Best Set Decoration	Piero Gherardi	Nominated
David di Donatello	Best Actress	Giulietta Masina	Won
Golden Globe Award	Best Foreign Language Film		Won
Nastro d'Argento	Best Director	Federico Fellini	Nominated
Nastro d'Argento	Best Actress	Giulietta Masina	Nominated
Nastro d'Argento	Best Supporting Actress	Sandra Milo	Won
Nastro d'Argento	Best Cinematography (Color)	Gianni Di Venanzo	Won
Nastro d'Argento	Best Production Design	Piero Gherardi	Won
Nastro d'Argento	Best Production Design	Piero Gherardi	Won
National Board of Review	Best Foreign Language Film		Won
National Board of Review	Top Five Foreign Language Films		Won
New York Film Critics Circle	Best Foreign Language Film		Won
Sant Jordi Award	Best Foreign Film	Federico Fellini	Won
Valladolid International Film Festival	Special Mention	Federico Fellini	Won
