= The Miami Story =

1954 film by Fred F. Sears

- Theatrical release poster
- Directed by: Fred F. Sears
- Screenplay by: Robert E. Kent
- Story by: Robert E. Kent
- Produced by: Sam Katzman
- Starring: Barry Sullivan; Luther Adler; Adele Jergens
- Cinematography: Henry Freulich
- Edited by: Viola Lawrence
- Music by: Mischa Bakaleinikoff
- Production company: Columbia Pictures
- Distributed by: Columbia Pictures
- Release date: May 3, 1954
- Running time: 75 minutes
- Country: United States
- Language: English
- Box office: $1 million

The Miami Story is a 1954 American film noir crime film directed by Fred F. Sears and starring Barry Sullivan, Luther Adler and Adele Jergens. It was produced by Sam Katzman for distribution by Columbia Pictures. The film features an introduction by Florida senator George Smathers.

The Miami Story was previously the working title of an unrelated film noir released two years earlier, The Las Vegas Story.

== Plot ==
Miami mob boss Tony Brill and hit man Ted Delacorte continue to elude the law. A scheme is hatched by attorney Frank Alton to bring former murder suspect Mick Flagg out of hiding, hoping he can infiltrate Brill's outfit.

Flagg reluctantly agrees. He leaves young son Gil with a Florida family, then gains Brill's trust, as well as that of Holly Abbott, whose sister Gwen is now the girlfriend of Brill.

Although he succeeds in disrupting Brill's business interests, Flagg is helpless to prevent Holly from being physically assaulted and Gil kidnapped. Holly betrays her sister, resulting in Gwen's arrest. A trap is set for Brill and Delacorte, who attempt to flee on a speedboat but are nabbed by the law.

== Cast ==
- Barry Sullivan as Mick Flagg, aka Mike Pierce
- Luther Adler as Tony Brill
- John Baer as Ted Delacorte
- Adele Jergens as Gwen Abbott
- Beverly Garland as Holly Abbott
- Dan Riss as Frank Alton
- Damian O'Flynn as Police Chief Martin Belman
- Chris Alcaide as Robert Bishop
- Gene Darcy as Johnny Loker
- George E. Stone as Louie Mott
- David Kasday as Gil Flagg
- Wheaton Chambers as Harry Dobey, Editor
- John Hamilton as Clifton Staley
- Al Hill as Simmons, Detective
- Lili St. Cyr as Stripper
