= Inside Straight (film) =

1951 film by Gerald Mayer

- Directed by: Gerald Mayer
- Written by: Guy Trosper
- Produced by: Richard Goldstone
- Starring: David Brian; Arlene Dahl; Barry Sullivan; Mercedes McCambridge; Paula Raymond
- Cinematography: Ray June
- Edited by: Newell P. Kimlin
- Music by: Lennie Hayton
- Color process: Black and white
- Production company: Metro-Goldwyn-Mayer
- Distributed by: Loew's Inc.
- Release dates: March 13, 1951 (Los Angeles); March 15, 1951 (New York)
- Running time: 87 minutes
- Country: United States
- Language: English
- Budget: $1,723,000
- Box office: $769,000

Inside Straight is a 1951 American Western film directed by Gerald Mayer and starring David Brian, Arlene Dahl, Barry Sullivan, Mercedes McCambridge, and Paula Raymond.

== Plot ==
In San Francisco in 1870, a run occurs on a bank owned by Ada Stritch. In desperate need of $3 million to keep the bank in operation, she appeals to Rip MacCool, a wealthy man whom she despises. Also in need of Rip's help are newspaperman Johnny Sanderson and an old acquaintance named Flutey. Ada and they each have an issue with Rip from their pasts. Rip offers to deal a hand of poker; if Ada wins, he will give her the $3 million, but if he wins, he will take ownership of the bank.

Everyone recalls how they first met. Fifteen years earlier, Ada, a widow, had a small hotel that she wanted to sell, and Rip and his pal Shocker were guests there. Rip wooed her romantically, then offered her $3,000 cash plus shares in the Mona Lisa gold mine. Ada accepted, only to learn later that the stock was worthless.

Johnny was a prizefighter, and after a defeat, Rip helped him find a job. Rip was broke, but suddenly discovered that a vein of gold struck at the Mona Lisa mine had increased the value of his stock to $250,000. Johnny loved a beautiful singer named Lily Douvane, but she married Rip for his money, leaving Johnny heartbroken. They had a baby boy and named him after Johnny. It was a loveless marriage, and when Lily caught Rip in a compromising position, she demanded a divorce, $1 million, and custody of their child.

Johnny cared about the baby and for Zoe, the nanny. Rip interfered again, proposing to Zoe and then angering her, as well as losing his fortune. Zoe mortgaged their home, and she also was pregnant. Rip regained his money, thanks again to the Mona Lisa mine, but lost both Zoe and his new baby in childbirth.

Shocker explains to those present how Rip became a cold-hearted man. At 16, unable to fund his parents' funeral, he worked with Shocker in a mine, and money came to mean everything to him. After hearing this, Ada agrees to the winner-take-all offer of a poker hand. Rip gracefully loses and the bank is saved, but all suspect that Rip, having a heart after all, intentionally withheld the winning hand.

== Cast ==
- David Brian as Rip Maccool
- Arlene Dahl as Lily Douvane
- Barry Sullivan as Johnny Sanderson
- Mercedes McCambridge as Ada Stritch
- Paula Raymond as Zoe Carnot
- Claude Jarman Jr. as Rip MacCool (Age 16)
- Lon Chaney Jr. as Shocker
- Monica Lewis as Cafe Singer
- John Hoyt as Flutey Johnson
- Roland Winters as Alexander Tomson
- Barbara Billingsley as Miss Meadson
- Richard Hale as Undertaker
- Hayden Rorke as Carlson
- Jerry Hartleben as John Albert MacCool (Age 3)
- Dale Hartleben as John Albert MacCool (Age 8)
- Lou Nova as Connegan

== Reception ==
In a contemporary review for The New York Times, critic Bosley Crowther wrote:

Anyone who has ever played poker with a person who takes all day to make up his mind whether to raise you, to call you, or to throw in his cards will partly appreciate the tedium of a picture called Inside Straight. Here, without a doubt, is recounted the most tiresome poker hand we've ever seen. ... A total of $6,000,000 is riding on the hand. Looking on, in attitudes of moderate interest, are three other gentlemen. And, at this point, what do you think happens? They start telling the stories of their lives! No fooling! … Our only wonder is that someone in that painfully suspended poker game doesn't pull out a gun and start shooting. What a time for a dull biography!

Critic Philip K. Scheuer of the Los Angeles Times wrote:

"Inside Straight" has a longwinded but intelligently plotted script by Guy Trosper, more feeling for a period (in the dialogue) than usual and typical Metro-Goldwyn-Mayer direction by—and who should know better?—Gerald Mayer. Its cast is practically a "who's who" of the studio's younger roster ... Even acknowledging the now -palpable handicap of the flashback, the picture retains a reasonable amount of interest as to the outcome.

The film was a financial failure. According to MGM records, the film earned $552,000 in the U.S. and Canada and $217,000 in other markets, causing a loss to the studio of $1,282,000.

== See also ==
- List of American films of 1951
