= Flame of Calcutta =

1953 film by Seymour Friedman

- Theatrical release poster
- Directed by: Seymour Friedman
- Written by: Sol Shor; Robert E. Kent
- Produced by: Sam Katzman
- Starring: Denise Darcel; Patric Knowles; Paul Cavanagh; Leonard Penn
- Narrated by: Fred F. Sears
- Cinematography: Ray Cory; Henry Freulich
- Edited by: Jerome Thoms
- Music by: Clifford Vaughan; Mischa Bakaleinikoff
- Production company: Esskay Pictures
- Distributed by: Columbia Pictures
- Release date: July 20, 1953
- Running time: 69 minutes
- Country: United States
- Language: English

Flame of Calcutta is a 1953 American historical adventure film directed by Seymour Friedman and starring Denise Darcel, Patric Knowles and Paul Cavanagh. It was one of a number of historical films made by Sam Katzman's production unit for Columbia Pictures. It is set in India in the 1750s. Unusually for a B Movie of the era, it was shot in Technicolor.

== Plot ==
In 1765 in India, amidst tensions among the provinces, Calcutta's King Amir Khasid (Gregory Gaye) is overthrown by the wicked Prince Jehan (George Keymas). Exiled to the hills of Sheran, Amir's forces continue the conflict, led by "The Flame" (Denise Darcel), a freedom fighter known for his brilliant red robes.

During an attack on a caravan of Jehan's supplies, The Flame is saved by Capt. Keith Lambert (Patric Knowles), head of the British militia assigned to guard the British East Indian Trading Company. Keith knows The Flame is actually Suzanne Roget, his fiancée and the daughter of a French government representative killed by Jehan during his uprising. Suzanne warns Keith that any involvement with Amir's forces could compromise the neutral British position and they must remain apart until Amir has regained the throne.

In Calcutta the following evening, Jehan entertains Lord Robert Clive (Paul Cavanagh), who is visiting from Bombay. Jehan requests aid in defending his caravans against the rebel raids, and when Clive refuses, citing British neutrality, Jehan warns that he could make it difficult for the trading company to continue business. Clive insists that the army does not have enough men to fight Amir, and that he trusts Keith's judgment as commanding officer.

Angered, Jehan and his advisor Nadir plot to attack the trading company using an imposter disguised as The Flame to force the British to retaliate against Amir. After the successful raid against the trading outpost, which appears to be led by The Flame, Keith informs Clive that he will go into the hills and bring The Flame to Calcutta for trial. Meanwhile, duplicitous peddlers Jowal and Rana Singh, who have traded with Amir, overhear Keith's plan and sell the information to Jehan with the additional knowledge that neither Keith nor Clive believes The Flame attacked the outpost. Jowal knows Suzanne is The Flame, but believes that the information will prove more useful later. Back at British headquarters, when Clive expresses concern over Keith's mission to bring The Flame to Calcutta, Keith reveals The Flame's identity and motive.

That night Keith rides out to the hills, where Jehan's men attempt an ambush. Keith fights off his attackers and then is rescued by The Flame, who is puzzled by his arrival. At Amir's camp, Keith explains that the British do not believe The Flame and Amir's men attacked the trading outpost, but that Jehan is responsible. He is convinced that bringing Suzanne to Calcutta to stand trial as The Flame will bring an end to the bloodshed before Suzanne is killed and perhaps will also force Jehan to expose himself as the man behind the outpost raid.

Suzanne agrees to return to Calcutta, but midway through their journey, they are intercepted by Jehan leading a large troop. As Suzanne is traveling under her own identity, Jehan is confused and asks Keith about the rumor that he was to arrest The Flame. Keith lies and explains that Suzanne has just returned from France for their marriage. At headquarters, Clive expresses concern that Keith lied about The Flame's identity, which, if discovered, would place the British in the uncomfortable position of defending a known bandit. At the palace, Jehan seethes over the misinformation about The Flame's arrest, but Jowal and Rana Singh return to reveal that Suzanne is The Flame. When Jehan questions how Jowal knows this, he explains that they were once taken prisoner by The Flame and saw her unmasked. Jowal suggests they arrest Suzanne and bring her together with the peddlers, whom she will recognize. Jehan agrees and, later that day at British headquarters, apprehends Suzanne, who acknowledges Jowal and Rana Singh when they pretend to have been tortured to reveal her identity. After Suzanne is taken to the palace dungeon, Jowal offers to return to British headquarters to learn about their plan of action to rescue Suzanne.

That night Jehan receives a note demanding the release of The Flame, signed by Amir. Certain that Amir must have the support of the British to make this threat, Jehan confronts Keith, who denies the army's involvement. Jehan demands British troops to battle Amir's forces in exchange for sparing Suzanne. Keith asks to discuss the matter with Suzanne and in her cell assures her that she will be released within twenty-four hours. He then advises Jehan he will receive no British aid.

At headquarters, now thoroughly suspicious of Jowal and Rana Singh, Keith intentionally lets them believe an arms caravan is arriving from the coast. Jowal passes the information on to Jehan, who plans to attack the shipment by using The Flame imposter in another attempt to provoke the British into fighting Amir. Jehan allows Suzanne to escape, then that night dresses in the red robes himself and leads the caravan assault as The Flame. The caravan wagons are filled with British soldiers, who fight off Jehan, assisted by Suzanne and Amir's forces. In the tumult of the battle, Suzanne kills Nadir, and after a lengthy fight Keith overpowers Jehan and arrests him. Jowal and Rana Singh are exiled, while Amir is reinstated to the throne and Keith and Suzanne are at last free to marry.

== Cast ==
- Denise Darcel as Suzanne Roget aka The Flame
- Patric Knowles as Capt. Keith Lambert
- Paul Cavanagh as Lord Robert Clive
- George Keymas as Prince Jehan
- Joseph Mell as Jowal
- Ted Thorpe as Rana Singh
- Leonard Penn as Nadir
- Gregory Gaye as Amir Khasid
- Edward Clark as Pandit Bandar
- Sujata Rubener as Exotic Dancer
- Asoka Rubener as Exotic Dancer
- Baynes Barron as Prince's Messenger
- Eddie Foster as Remir
- Leonard P. Geer as Jehan Man / Flame Man
- Sol Gorss as Jehan Man / Soldier
- Sam Harris as British Officer
- Robin Hughes as Lt. Bob Ramsey

== Reception ==
Blockbuster Entertainment Guide to Movies and Videos gave the movie 3.5 stars out of five.

== Bibliography ==
- Eldridge, David. Hollywood's History Films. I.B.Tauris, 2006.
