= Barry Sullivan (American actor) =

American actor (1912–1994)

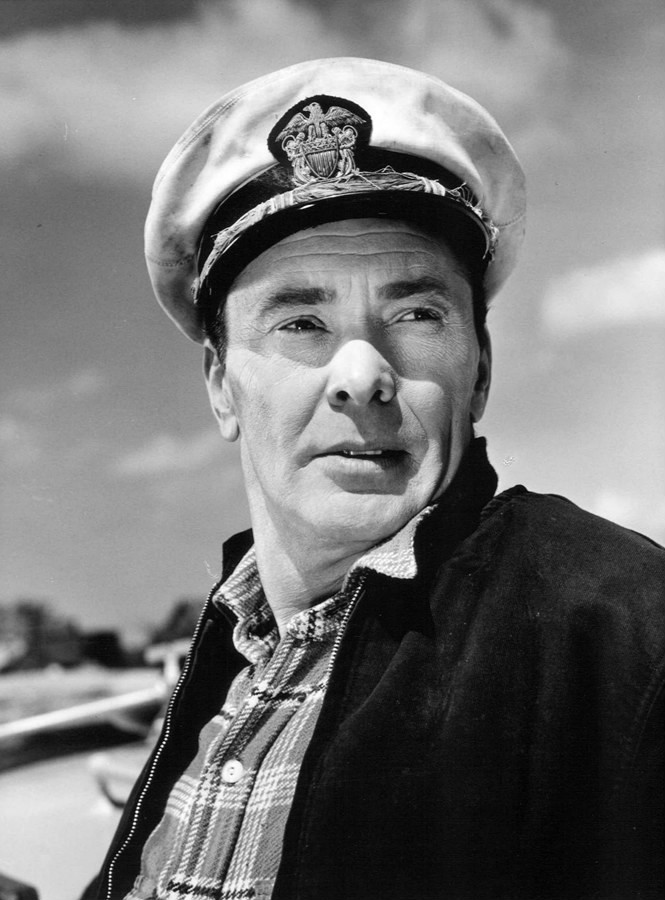
- Barry Sullivan in Harbormaster (1957)
- Born: Patrick Barry Sullivan; August 29, 1912; New York City, U.S.
- Died: June 6, 1994 (aged 81); Sherman Oaks, Los Angeles, California, U.S.
- Occupation: Actor
- Years active: 1936–1987
- Spouses: Marie Brown (m. 1937; div. 1957) Gita Hall (m. 1958; div. 1961) Desiree Sumarra (m. 1962; div. 1965)
- Children: 3

Patrick Barry Sullivan (August 29, 1912 – June 6, 1994) was an American actor of film, television, theatre, and radio. In a career that spanned over 40 years, Sullivan appeared in over 100 movies from the 1930s to the 1980s, primarily as a leading actor after establishing himself in the industry, and later as a character actor.

Memorable films and TV programs that Sullivan appeared in include The Great Gatsby, The Bad and the Beautiful, Forty Guns, The Price, and Pat Garrett and Billy the Kid. He was a featured guest performer in the top television series of his day, starring in two series, Harbormaster and The Tall Man. He was nominated for a Primetime Emmy Award for his performance on the 1955 teleplay The Caine Mutiny Court-Martial.

Ronald Bergan wrote in The Guardian in 1994: "Second division Hollywood actors like Barry Sullivan ... are usually faintly praised for being reliable or solid. However, when given the chance, Sullivan was a powerful, often baleful presence on screen, providing more pleasure than many more touted stars. "

== Early years ==
Sullivan was born in New York City. A law student at New York University and Temple University, he fell into acting when in college playing semi-pro football. He was later a department store buyer.

== Career ==
=== Broadway stage, film shorts and radio ===
Sullivan's first appearance on Broadway was in I Want a Policeman in 1936. That year he was also in R.C. Sheriff's St Helena. Sullivan appeared in shorts such as Strike! You're Out (1936), Broker's Follies (1937), Dime a Dance (1937) (alongside Imogene Coca, June Allyson and Danny Kaye), Dates and Nuts (1937), and Hi-Ho Hollywood (1937). He returned to Broadway with roles in All That Glitters (1938) and Eye on the Sparrow (1938) (with a young Montgomery Clift). He received attention when he joined the cast of the long running The Man Who Came to Dinner (1939) as Bert Jefferson. He was also in Mr Big (1941), Ring Around Elizabeth (1941) and Johnny 2 X 4 (1942). Sullivan appeared with Bette Davis on stage in 1960 in The World of Carl Sandburg as a substitute for her husband Gary Merrill. In 1950, Sullivan replaced Vincent Price in the role of Leslie Charteris' Simon Templar on the NBC Radio show The Saint. Sullivan lasted only two episodes before the show was cancelled.

=== Movies ===
Sullivan had a small role in the Universal serial The Green Hornet Strikes Again! (1941). He had a supporting part in High Explosive (1943) for Pine-Thomas Productions, who released through Paramount, and he was the second male lead in The Woman of the Town (1943) with Claire Trevor.

He was signed to a long-term contract by Paramount, who gave him a good support role in an "A" film, the musical Lady in the Dark (1944) with Ginger Rogers. He supported Dorothy Lamour in Rainbow Island (1944) and Alan Ladd and Loretta Young in And Now Tomorrow (1944), and was one of many Paramount names in Duffy's Tavern (1945). He supported Dennis O'Keefe and Marie McDonald in the comedy, Getting Gertie's Garter (1945).

Then he went to Monogram Pictures for Suspense (1946), the most expensive film that studio had made to date, produced by the King Brothers; Sullivan was second billed to Belita. Monogram were delighted with his work; Sullivan obtained a release from his Paramount contract and signed a three-picture deal with Monogram. Sullivan supported Brian Aherne and Constance Bennett in Smart Woman (1948) for Bennett's company, releasing through Monogram (as Allied Artists). He received top billing for a Western from the King Brothers and Monogram, Bad Men of Tombstone (1949).

MGM signed Sullivan to a contract, and he played supporting roles in Tension (1950), The Outriders (1950), Nancy Goes to Rio (1950), A Life of Her Own (1950), and Grounds for Marriage (1951). He was upped to leading man for Cause for Alarm! (1951) with Young and Payment on Demand (1951) with Bette Davis at RKO but was back down the cast list for Three Guys Named Mike (1951), Mr. Imperium (1951), and Inside Straight (1951). He was given top billing in No Questions Asked (1951), a role originally meant for Gable.

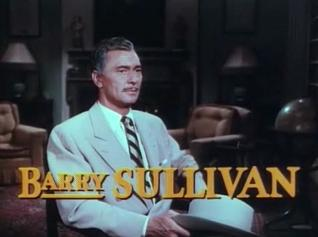
From the trailer for Her Twelve Men (1954)

Sullivan played the lead in a series of lower budgeted films noir: Loophole (1954) for Allied Artists, Playgirl (1954) at Universal, and The Miami Story (1954) for Sam Katzman. He went back to MGM for a support role in Her Twelve Men (1954).

In June 1954, he returned to Broadway to replace Henry Fonda in The Caine Mutiny Court-Martial. He went to Paramount to support James Stewart in Strategic Air Command (1955) and guested on shows like General Electric Theater, Studio One in Hollywood, Climax! and Ford Star Jubilee (reprising his Caine Mutiny performance).

Sullivan was leading man to Joan Crawford in Queen Bee (1955), Claudette Colbert in Texas Lady (1955), Barbara Stanwyck in The Maverick Queen (1956) and Doris Day in Julie (1956).

In 1956, he was in Too Late the Phalarope on Broadway which had a short run.

He had the lead in a low budget Western Dragoon Wells Massacre (1957), The Way to the Gold (1957), and Sam Fuller's Forty Guns (1957) with Stanwyck. He was Lana Turner's leading man in Another Time, Another Place (1958) and played star roles in some films for Allied Artists, including Wolf Larsen (1958), an adaptation of The Sea Wolf wherein Sullivan played the title role, and The Purple Gang (1959), a gangster film.

His last film was The Last Straw in 1987.

=== Television ===
In the 1953-1954 television season, Sullivan appeared with other celebrities as a musical judge on Jukebox Jury. His first starring television role was a syndicated adaptation of the radio series The Man Called X for Ziv Television in 1956–1957 as secret agent Ken Thurston. He directed some episodes of Highway Patrol, which was made by Ziv, who did Harbourmaster. He continued to make guest appearances on shows like Alfred Hitchcock Presents, Pursuit, Playhouse 90, The DuPont Show with June Allyson, The United States Steel Hour and Westinghouse Desilu Playhouse, and he was in a TV adaptation of My Three Angels. Sullivan starred in a western TV show, The Tall Man (1960–1962) and the television series The Road West, as family patriarch Ben Pride. He guest starred on Perry Mason, Mission: Impossible, Bonanza, Garrison's Gorillas, Mannix, The Man from U.N.C.L.E., That Girl, and It Takes a Thief. Sullivan also appeared in the first season of Barnaby Jones; episode titled, "A Little Glory, A Little Death" which initially aired April 29, 1973.

He has two stars on the Hollywood Walk of Fame: one at 1500 Vine St. for his work in television, and another at 6160 Hollywood Blvd. for motion pictures.

== Personal life and death ==
Sullivan was married three times and had three children. Marie Brown (married 1937, divorced 1957), a Broadway actress, was mother to both Jenny and John Sullivan.

Sullivan married model and actress Gita Hall in 1958; they divorced in June 1961. The couple's daughter, Patsy, was a child model. While married to songwriter Jimmy Webb, Patsy gave Sullivan seven grandchildren.

Sullivan's third marriage was to Desiree Sumarra. The union produced no children and ended in divorce in 1965.

Sullivan died at age 81 of respiratory failure on June 6, 1994.

== Partial filmography ==
- The Green Hornet Strikes Again! (1940) as Thug in Back Seat
- High Explosive (1943) as Mike Douglas
- The Woman of the Town (1943) as King Kennedy
- Lady in the Dark (1944) as Dr. Brooks
- Rainbow Island (1944) as Ken Masters
- And Now Tomorrow (1944) as Jeff Stoddard
- Duffy's Tavern (1945) as Danny Murphy
- Getting Gertie's Garter (1945) as Ted Dalton
- Suspense (1946) as Joe Morgan
- Framed (1947) as Steve Price
- The Gangster (1947) as Shubunka
- Smart Woman (1948) as Frank McCoy
- Bad Men of Tombstone (1949) as Tom Horn
- Any Number Can Play (1949) as Tycoon
- The Great Gatsby (1949) as Tom Buchanan
- Tension (1950) as Lieutenant Collier Bonnabel
- The Outriders (1950) as Jesse Wallace
- Nancy Goes to Rio (1950) as Paul Berten
- A Life of Her Own (1950) as Lee Gorrance
- Grounds for Marriage (1951) as Chris Bartlett
- Payment on Demand (1951) as David Anderson Ramsey
- Three Guys Named Mike (1951) as Mike Tracy
- Inside Straight (1951) as Johnny Sanderson
- Mr. Imperium (1951) as Paul Hunter
- Cause for Alarm! (1951) as George Z. Jones
- No Questions Asked (1951) as Steve Keiver
- The Unknown Man (1951) as Joe Bucknor
- Skirts Ahoy! (1952) as Lieutenant Commander Paul Elcott
- The Bad and the Beautiful (1952) as Fred Amiel
- Jeopardy (1953) as Doug Stilwin
- Cry of the Hunted (1953) as Lieutenant Tunner
- A Slight Case of Larceny (1953) as Radio Stock Quoter (voice, uncredited)
- China Venture (1953) as Commander Bert Thompson
- Loophole (1954) as Mike Donovan
- Playgirl (1954) as Mike Marsh
- The Miami Story (1954) as Mick Flagg aka Mike Pierce
- Her Twelve Men (1954) as Richard Y. Oliver Sr.
- Strategic Air Command (1955) as Lieutenant Colonel Rocky Samford
- Queen Bee (1955) as Avery Phillips
- Texas Lady (1955) as Chris Mooney
- The Maverick Queen (1956) as Jeff Younger
- Julie (1956) as Cliff Henderson
- Forty Guns (1957) as Griff Bonell
- The Way to the Gold (1957) as Marshal Hannibal
- Dragoon Wells Massacre (1957) as Link Ferris
- Alfred Hitchcock Presents (1958) (Season 4 Episode 5: "The $2,000,000 Defense") as Mark Robeson
- Another Time, Another Place (1958) as Carter Reynolds
- Wolf Larsen (1958) as Wolf Larsen
- The Purple Gang (1959) as Police Lieutenant William P. Harley
- Seven Ways from Sundown (1960) as Jim Flood
- The Alfred Hitchcock Hour (1962) (Season 1 Episode 10: "Day of Reckoning") as Paul Sampson
- Light in the Piazza (1962) as Noel Johnson
- A Gathering of Eagles (1963) as Colonel Bill Fowler
- Pyro... The Thing Without a Face (1964) as Vance Pierson
- Man in the Middle (1964) as General Kempton
- Perry Mason (1964) (Season 8: The Case of The Thermal Thief) as Ken Kramer
- Stage to Thunder Rock (1964) as Sheriff Horne
- My Blood Runs Cold (1965) as Julian Merriday
- Harlow (1965) as Marino Bello
- Planet of the Vampires (1965) as Captain Mark Markary
- The Poppy Is Also a Flower (1966) as Chasen
- Intimacy (1966) as Walter Nicholson
- An American Dream (1966) as Police Lieutenant G. Roberts
- Mission: Impossible (1967) as Alex Lowell
- Buckskin (1968) as Chaddock
- How to Steal the World (1968) as Dr. Robert Kingsley
- That Girl (1968, TV Series) as himself
- It Takes All Kinds (1969) as Orville Benton
- Shark! (1969) as Professor Dan Malair
- Tell Them Willie Boy Is Here (1969) as Ray Calvert
- The Arrangement (1969) as Chet Collier (uncredited)
- The Immortal (1969–1970, TV Series) as Jordan Braddock
- The High Chaparral (1970) as Dan Casement
- Kung Fu (1972) (pilot movie) as Dillon
- Savage (1973) as Judge Daniel Stern
- Pat Garrett and Billy the Kid (1973) as Chisum
- Hurricane (1974) as Hank Stoddard
- Earthquake (1974) as Stockle
- Take a Hard Ride (1975) as Kane
- The 'Human' Factor (1975) as Edmonds
- Violent Naples (1976) as 'O' Generale
- Survival (1976) as Barry
- Grand Jury (1976) as Don Bentine
- Rich Man, Poor Man Book II as Senator Paxton (1976–77)
- Oh, God! (1977) as Bishop Reardon
- The Washington Affair (1977) as Walter Nicholson
- The Bastard (1978) as Abraham Ware
- Caravans (1978) as Richardson
- Little House on the Prairie (1979) (Season 6: Author! Author!) as Frederick Holbrook
- The Last Straw (1987) (final film role)

== Radio appearances ==
Year	Program	Episode/source
1946	Lux Radio Theatre	Coney Island
1952	Hollywood Star Playhouse	Death Is a Right Hook
1953	Hollywood Star Playhouse	The Soil
1953	Stars over Hollywood	Dry Spell

In 1950 Barry Sullivan filled in for Vincent Price (delayed in Paris) as The Saint (The Ghost that Giggled, Sept 17, 1950)
