= The Gun Runners =

1958 film by Don Siegel

- Theatrical release poster
- Directed by: Donald Siegel
- Screenplay by: Daniel Mainwaring; Paul Monash
- Based on: To Have and Have Not (novel) by Ernest Hemingway
- Produced by: Herbert E. Stewart; Clarence Greene
- Starring: Audie Murphy
- Cinematography: Hal Mohr
- Edited by: Chester W. Shaeffer
- Music by: Leith Stevens
- Production company: Seven Arts Productions
- Distributed by: United Artists
- Release date: September 1958 (United States)
- Running time: 83 minutes
- Country: United States
- Language: English

The Gun Runners is a 1958 American film noir crime film directed by Donald Siegel. It is the third adaptation of Ernest Hemingway's 1937 novel To Have and Have Not (after 1944's To Have and Have Not and 1950's The Breaking Point), and stars Audie Murphy as a down-on-his-luck charter boat captain who begins smuggling guns for Cuban revolutionaries.

Don Siegel, writing about the film in his memoirs, reflected, "There’s an old adage; never make a sea picture with a C budget."

== Plot ==
Sam Martin (Audie Murphy) runs a charter boat in the Florida Keys with his alcoholic first mate, Harvey (Everett Sloane). He struggles to make a living and pay off his boat. After a major customer loses his fishing gear, turns out to have no money, and is arrested for passing bad checks, Sam tries to recoup his losses by pawning some of his gear and gambling with the proceeds. He is unsuccessful, but a successful fellow gambler, Hanagan (Eddie Albert), hires him to take him out in his boat on an overnight trip.

During the trip, Hanagan pays Sam extra to take him and his girlfriend to a port near Havana for the evening. Sam agrees, although as he has no official permission, he has to avoid the marine authorities. Unbeknown to Sam, Hanagan spends his time in Cuba arranging to deliver guns to rebel forces in Cuba. When they return to the Keys, Sam is interrogated by the police, who tell him two men were murdered in the Cuban port that night. Sam realises Hanagan must have been the murderer.

Sam tells his wife (Patricia Owens) that he is going to have no more to do with Hanagan, but after his boat is repossessed, and Hanagan offers him a large amount of money, Sam agrees to take him on another illicit trip to Cuba, not knowing that the purpose of the trip is running guns. Hanagan insists that Harvey be left behind, but Harvey stows away, determined to help Sam deal with Hanagan and the three other criminals on board. During the voyage to Cuba, the criminals discover Harvey, and it triggers a confrontation. Harvey dons a life vest and jumps overboard, and while the criminals are firing at him in the water, Sam takes matters into his own hands.

== Cast ==
- Audie Murphy as Sam Martin
- Eddie Albert as Hanagan
- Patricia Owens as Lucy Martin
- Everett Sloane as Harvey
- Richard Jaeckel as Buzurki
- Paul Birch as Sy Philips
- Jack Elam as Arnold
- John Qualen as Pop
- Edward Colmans as Juan
- Steven Peck as Pepito
- Carl Rogers as Carlos Contreras
- Gita Hall as Eva
- Robert Phillips as Outlaw (uncredited)

== Production ==
According to Don Siegel, star Audie Murphy had asked him to direct the film and United Artists agreed following the success of Baby Face Nelson. However, Siegel was worried about the low budget.

This was the first feature from the fledgling Seven Arts Productions. Director Don Siegel was unhappy with having to use Audie Murphy in the lead role. However, Siegel wrote Murphy "was always polite and quiet with me, never any trouble."

The film was shot in Newport Beach, California.

== Reception ==
Ron. of Variety called it a "well-done adventure yarn with average b.o. prospects".

== See also ==
- List of American films of 1958

== Notes ==
- Siegel, Don (1993). A Siegel Film: An Autobiography. Boston: Faber and Faber. ISBN 978-0-571-16270-3 – via Internet Archive.
