= Texas Lady =

1955 film

- Original poster
- Directed by: Tim Whelan
- Written by: Horace McCoy (story & screenplay)
- Produced by: Nat Holt; Lewis P Rosen (uncredited)
- Starring: Claudette Colbert; Barry Sullivan; Ray Collins
- Cinematography: Ray Rennahan
- Edited by: Richard W. Farrell
- Music by: Paul Sawtell
- Production company: Nat Holt Productions
- Distributed by: RKO Radio Pictures
- Release date: November 30, 1955 (US)
- Running time: 86 minutes
- Country: United States
- Language: English

Texas Lady is a 1955 color American Western film directed by Tim Whelan in his final film before his death in 1957, and distributed by RKO Radio Pictures. It stars Claudette Colbert, Barry Sullivan and Ray Collins. The film tells the story of a female publisher who encounters injustice and violence in a Southern town.

== Plot ==
On a riverboat, in 1885, gambler Chris Mooney loses heavily to Prudence Webb, then borrows a further $30,000 which he also loses to her. He offers her a partnership but Prudence declines, informing him that her father embezzled funds to gamble with Chris, then committed suicide after he lost. Prudence has therefore avenged her father's loss and has the money to pay back her late father's employer. She rides to Fort Ralston in Texas to claim her inheritance, the Clarion newspaper, which her dad won in a card game. Stringer Winfield, the postal carrier, warns her that town founder Micah Ralston and ranch partner Sturdy own practically everything and everybody. Clay Ballard, the editor of the Clarion, tries to get Prudence's ownership overturned, but drunken lawyer Cass Gower sobers up and wins her case, even though Judge Herzog is in Ralston's pocket. A hired gun, Jess Foley, acting as a "deputy," kills Gantz, a rival rancher. Foley then makes a play for Prudence, asking her to dance and to teach him to read. Prudence initially thinks he is lying about being illiterate but on finding this is true attends the evening dance at the Fandango. However, she resists his advances. Chris shows up. Foley objects to his romantic interest in Prudence, and Prudence warns Chris to beware of Foley's jealousy and gun. Chris manages to hold off Foley, who also has Gantz's widow after him. The crooked sheriff, Herndon (on orders from Ralston) gives Prudence 24-hour's notice within which to repay $6,000 due in back taxes from the newspaper, or forfeit her property. Prudence concedes defeat and intends to ride out of town with Chris, who gambled unsuccessfully and failed to raise the money. Chris sits on a chair outside the Clarion office and waits for Foley. As Foley draws his gun, Chris (still seated) shoots him in the hand. Chris is put in jail but the judge is persuaded to grant habeas corpus and he is released. Meanwhile, Gantz's widow enters the sheriff's office and shoots Foley dead in vengeance for his killing of her husband. The sheriff nails a notice of sale on the newspaper office. Her new friends in the town collect the $6,000 on her behalf, and order the arrest of the sheriff. They have an election for new city officials, electing Chris as the new mayor, Cass as the new judge and saloon owner Moore as the new sheriff. Ralston objects to the election results and uses his controlling power of the surrounding land to create a blockade. Stringer rides for the Texas Rangers as Ralston cannot hold up the US mail. Ralston's men encircle the town and start shooting, killing Cass. The Texas Rangers arrive and after reasoning with the Judge, Rangers and his men, Ralston finally gives in and returns the $6000 falsely claimed as tax and leaves the town to govern itself with Prudence's debts cleared.

== Cast ==
- Claudette Colbert as Prudence Webb
- Barry Sullivan as Chris Mooney
- Ray Collins as Mica Ralston (rancher)
- James Bell as Cass Gower
- Horace McMahon as Stringer Winfield
- Gregory Walcott as Deputy Jess Foley
- John Litel as Meade Moore (wigwam owner)
- Douglas Fowley as Clay Ballard (Clarion owner)
- Don Haggerty as Sheriff Herndon
- Walter Sande as Whit Sturdy (rancher)
- Alexander Campbell as Judge E. Ness Herzog
- Florenz Ames as Wilson (general store owner)
- Kathleen Mulqueen as Nancy (Nanny) Winfield
- Robert Lynn as Reverend Callender
- Paul Wexler as hotel clerk (uncredited)
