= Bengal Brigade =

1954 film by László Benedek

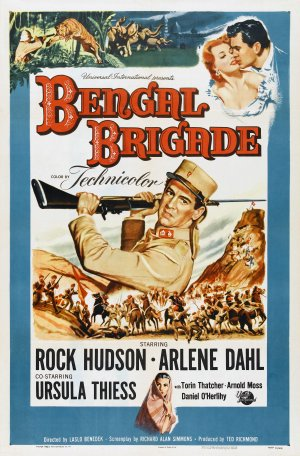
- Film poster by Reynold Brown
- Directed by: Laslo Benedek
- Written by: Seton I. Miller; Richard Alan Simmons
- Based on: Bengal Tigers by Hall Hunter
- Produced by: Ted Richmond
- Starring: Rock Hudson; Arlene Dahl; Ursula Thiess
- Cinematography: Maury Gertsman
- Edited by: Frank Gross
- Music by: Hans J. Salter
- Production company: Universal-International
- Distributed by: Universal-International
- Release date: October 27, 1954
- Running time: 87 minutes
- Country: United States
- Language: English

Bengal Brigade is a 1954 American adventure war film directed by Laslo Benedek and starring Rock Hudson, Arlene Dahl and Ursula Thiess. The film was produced and distributed by Universal Pictures, based on the 1952 novel The Bengal Tiger: a Tale of India by Edison Marshall writing as Hall Hunter. It was released in Britain as Bengal Rifles.

== Plot ==
Set in British India in 1857, at the outbreak of the Indian Mutiny. A British officer, Captain Claybourne (Rock Hudson), is cashiered from his regiment over a charge of disobeying orders, but finds that his duty to his men is far from over. He loves his Colonel's daughter (Arlene Dahl) and redeems himself in fighting renegade Sepoys.

== Cast ==
- Rock Hudson as Capt. Jeffrey Claybourne
- Arlene Dahl as Vivian Morrow
- Ursula Thiess as Latah
- Torin Thatcher as Col. Morrow
- Arnold Moss as Rajah Karam
- Dan O'Herlihy as Capt. Ronald Blaine
- Harold Gordon as Hari Lal
- Michael Ansara as Sgt. Maj. Furan Singh
- Leonard Strong as Mahindra
- Shepard Menken as Bulbir
- Sujata Rubener as Indian Dancer
- Asoka Rubener as Indian Dancer
- Jack Raine as Col. Rivers
- Ramsay Hill as Maj. Jennings
- Leslie Denison as Capt. Ian McLeod
- John Dodsworth as Capt. Guy Fitz-Morell
- Paul Marion as Hardev
- Charles Wagenheim as Headman
- Robert Bice as Native Sergeant
- Hy Anzell as Sepoy
- Mel Welles as Merchant
- Frank Lackteen as Merchant

== Production ==
Rock Hudson replaced Tyrone Power, who instead starred in 20th Century Fox's King of the Khyber Rifles. The production was shot on Universal's backlot and the Iverson Movie Ranch where The Lives of a Bengal Lancer (1935) and The Charge of the Light Brigade (1936) were also filmed.

== Bibliography ==
- Bego, Mark. Rock Hudson: Public and Private : an Unauthorized Biography. New American Library, 1986.
- Goble, Alan. The Complete Index to Literary Sources in Film. Walter de Gruyter, 1999.
- Richards, Jeffrey. Visions of Yesterday. Routledge & Kegan Paul, 1973.
