= Gita Hall =

Swedish-American model and actress

- Gita Hall, Barry Sullivan, and Peter Graves starred in the 1958 movie "Wolf Larsen".
- Born: Birgitta Wetterhall; 6 September 1933; Linköping, Sweden
- Died: 13 August 2016 (aged 82); Studio City, California
- Spouses: Leslie Jackson (m. 1954; div. 1957) Barry Sullivan (m. 1958; div. 1961) Mitchell May (m. 1964; died 2000)
- Children: 3 daughters

Gita Hall (6 September 1933 – 13 August 2016) was a Swedish-American model and actress who was the second wife of actor Barry Sullivan and a member of the jet set in the 1950s and 1960s.

== Early years ==
Hall was born Birgitta Wetterhall in Linköping, Sweden. The daughter of a doctor and lawyer, turned pharmacist during World War 2, Hall spoke seven languages. She worked as a model to pay tuition for her studies at a dramatic school in Sweden.

She had minor roles in three Swedish movies in 1951–1952 and won the Miss Stockholm beauty pageant in 1953. In the mid-1950s, she became a model in New York. She appeared on dozens of magazine covers and scored a contract with Revlon.

Broadway columnist and radio personality Walter Winchell "discovered" her and got her into Hollywood movies. (An International News Service story published 26 February 1958, says that Hall "landed in the movies by way of producer Clarence Greene, whom she met at a party in New York.")

== Film ==
Hall's American film debut came in Don Siegel's The Gun Runners, an adaptation of Ernest Hemingway's To Have and Have Not. She appeared with Sullivan in the 1958 movie Wolf Larsen.

In 2013, Hall settled a lawsuit she filed against Lionsgate, the production company behind the TV series Mad Men for using an image of her gleaned from a 1960s Revlon ad in the show's opening title credits sequence. The image was taken from a Richard Avedon photograph; the producers had secured permission from Revlon, but not from Hall.

== Personal life ==
Hall married Leslie Jackson in August 1954. After they divorced, she married Sullivan in 1958; they divorced in 1961. Hall was the mother of Sullivan's daughter Birgitta 'Patricia' Christina. Known as Patsy, Gita's daughter by Sullivan, followed in her footsteps and became a top model and cover girl as well, starting when she was 12. Hall later married Mitchell May III, an insurance broker and had two more daughters, Tracie and Samantha with May. He died in 2000. In 2003, Gita moved from Manhattan to Century City, California to go back to acting. Hall had a short lived reality show called ‘ Old Skool' co-starring with actress Terry Moore. The show found an audience in Europe but only had a year run. Bunim Murray was the producer and distributor. Hall also appeared in on line commercials and had small parts in several network television shows. Hall was dressed to the nines in designer clothing and matched her dress for the day to fine jewelry she collected. Her daughters say, 'Mom was the Swedish Joan Collins, she was very fancy and also quick to laugh. She was fabulous.'

== Death ==
Hall died of liver failure in Studio City, Los Angeles. She was survived by three daughters, nine grandchildren and one great-granddaughter.

== Filmography ==
- The Still Life (2006) – Art buyer
- The Gun Runners (1958) – Eva
- Wolf Larsen (1958) – Kristina
