= Watch the Birdie (1950 film) =

1950 film by Jack Donohue

- Directed by: Jack Donohue
- Written by: Marshall Neilan Jr. Ivan Tors; Devery Freeman; Harry Ruskin
- Produced by: Harry Ruskin
- Starring: Red Skelton; Arlene Dahl; Ann Miller
- Cinematography: Paul Vogel
- Edited by: John Faure; Robert Watts; Ferris Webster
- Music by: George Stoll
- Production company: Metro-Goldwyn-Mayer
- Distributed by: Loew's Inc
- Release date: December 11, 1950
- Running time: 71 minutes
- Country: United States
- Language: English
- Budget: $996,000
- Box office: $1,844,000

Watch the Birdie is a 1950 American comedy film directed by Jack Donohue and starring Red Skelton, Arlene Dahl and Ann Miller.

== Plot ==
Rusty Cammeron is a clumsy photographer in debt who owns a shop with his father and grandfather. After speaking with a customer, Rusty hatches a plan to try to take candid pictures of the rich and famous. While attempting to photograph heiress Lucia Corlane, Rusty loses his expensive camera. Lucia feels somewhat responsible for the mishap and likes Rusty. She arranges for him to take pictures and film of her business interest, a new housing subdivision called Lucky Vista.

Rusty fumbles the assignment but unknowingly films Lucia's estate's manager Grantland Farns and a banker named Shanway discussing their stake in Lucky Vista and how they are going to swindle Lucia. Rusty snaps publicity photos of the glamorous Miss Lucky Vista, a woman who has been paid by Farns and Shanway to stage a compromising situation with Rusty for Lucia to witness. Rusty realizes that he has the incriminating film evidence and rushes to rescue Lucia from the crooks and to redeem himself. Rusty and Lucia are chased as they try to reach the police station. On the way, they decide to marry.

== Cast ==
- Red Skelton as Rusty / Pop / Grandpop
- Arlene Dahl as Lucia
- Ann Miller as Miss Lucky Vista
- Leon Ames as Grantland Farns
- Pamela Britton as Mrs. Shanway
- Richard Rober as Mr. Shanway
- Lurene Tuttle as Millie
- Andrew Tombes as Doctor
- Joseph Crehan as Police Captain
- Robert Emmett O'Connor as Policeman
- Kathleen O'Malley as Woman who undresses
- Willard Waterman as Mayor
- Larry Steers as Admiral Battlevitz (uncredited)
- Ken Terrell as Guard (uncredited)

== Production ==
Red Skelton plays the roles of three generations: the central character, his father and his grandfather. Parts of the film were inspired by the 1928 comedy The Cameraman by Buster Keaton, who was at that point in his career working as a gagman at MGM and advising Skelton.

Clips of the 1940 film Boom Town and the 1941 film Johnny Eager are shown in the film.

== Reception ==
In a contemporary review for The New York Times, critic Bosley Crowther called Watch the Birdie a "generally labored antic" and wrote: "Either Red Skelton is weakening or his writers have sadly let him down ... [H]e is barely up to the test of a few minor comic situations that might never confront a shudder man. ... The time has come for Mr. Skelton to look for a new formula."

According to MGM records, the film earned $1,318,000 in the U.S. and Canada and $526,000 elsewhere, resulting in a profit of $218,000.
