= The Outriders =

1950 American Western film by Roy Rowland

- Film poster
- Directed by: Roy Rowland
- Written by: Irving Ravetch
- Produced by: Richard Goldstone
- Starring: Joel McCrea
- Cinematography: Charles Schoenbaum
- Edited by: Robert J. Kern
- Music by: André Previn
- Color process: Technicolor
- Production company: Metro-Goldwyn-Mayer
- Distributed by: Metro-Goldwyn-Mayer
- Release date: March 1, 1950
- Running time: 93 minutes
- Country: United States
- Language: English
- Budget: $1,621,000
- Box office: $2,179,000

The Outriders is a 1950 American Western film directed by Roy Rowland and starring Joel McCrea.

== Plot ==
With the Civil War nearing an end, rebel soldiers Will Owen, Jesse Wallace and Clint Priest escape from a Union stockade in Missouri. Bandit leader and Confederate sympathizer Keeley recruits them to join a wagon train run by Don Chaves that is carrying gold bullion worth a million dollars from Santa Fe, New Mexico. After the men join the wagon train, they are to guide it to a predetermined spot where Keeley and his men will ambush the wagon train and steal the gold, ostensibly to deliver it to Richmond and the Confederacy.

The men see it as a chance to help the South and also profit. Chaves is suspicious of them but permits them to be outriders, accompanying the wagon train but staying 200 yards from the others. Apaches attack and the three men help repel them, gaining the trust of Chaves.

The beautiful widow Jen Gort attracts the interest of Will and Jesse. She is escorting her teenage brother-in-law Roy, who is eager to prove his courage to the older men by fighting Indians by their side. The boy inadvertently causes a stampede and then drowns while attempting to cross a raging river.

News arrives that the war is over. The robbery no longer interests Will, but Jesse is determined to proceed with it so that he and Keeley can split the money. He reveals that Keeley had planned to steal the gold for his men and himself all along. Will disarms Jesse and tells Chaves about the planned ambush. They arrive at the predetermined spot and successfully defeat the ambush. A final gunfight ends in Jesse's death. Will and Jen are clear to proceed with their life together.

== Cast ==
- Joel McCrea as Will Owen
- Arlene Dahl as Jen Gort
- Barry Sullivan as Jesse Wallace
- Claude Jarman Jr. as Roy Gort
- James Whitmore as Clint Priest
- Ramon Novarro as Don Antonio Chaves
- Jeff Corey as Keeley
- Ted de Corsia as Bye
- Martin Garralaga as Father Damasco
- Harry Tenbrook as Prisoner (uncredited)

== Production ==
Parts of the film were shot in the Utah locations of Duck Creek, Aspen Mirror Lake, Strawberry Valley, Paria, Long Valley and Asay Creek.

== Reception ==
In a contemporary review for The New York Times, critic Thomas M. Pryor called The Outriders "a classy-looking Western" and wrote:

"The Outriders" follows a conventional storyline of adventure in the days of wagon trains and marauding Indians, but it comes off with neatness and dispatch and succeeds in generating some lively interest now and again. ... The ride north drags at times but it never gets dull, for the scenery is magnificent. ... Under Roy Rowland's direction all the elements of a good Western—suspense, action, romance and inspiring photography—are evident in "The Outriders." And it has that all important bang-up climax. too, when McCrea learns the war is over and attempts to lead the party out of the ambush. Contrived, you say? Sure, but who wants to examine the story closely anyway?

According to MGM records, the film earned $1,540,000 in the U.S. and Canada and $639,000 elsewhere, resulting in a loss to the studio of $497,000.

== See also ==
- List of American films of 1950
