= Wolf Larsen (film) =

1958 film by Harmon Jones

- Directed by: Harmon Jones
- Screenplay by: Jack DeWitt; Turnley Walker
- Based on: novel The Sea Wolf by Jack London
- Produced by: Lindsley Parsons
- Starring: Barry Sullivan; Peter Graves
- Cinematography: Floyd Crosby
- Edited by: John Blunk; Maurice Wright
- Music by: Paul Dunlap
- Production company: Lindsley Parsons Productions
- Distributed by: Allied Artists Pictures
- Release date: October 26, 1958
- Running time: 83 minutes
- Country: United States
- Language: English

Wolf Larsen is a 1958 American adventure film directed by Harmon Jones and starring Barry Sullivan and Peter Graves.

== Premise ==
A mean-spirited ship captain keeps his crew under his autocratic thumb while indulging his more refined side. But when his men rise up in mutiny, Larsen forces the cultured Van Weyden to help him quash the uprising.

== Cast ==
- Barry Sullivan as Wolf Larsen
- Peter Graves as Van Weyden
- Gita Hall as Kristina
- Thayer David as Mugridge
- John Alderson as Johnson
- Rico Alaniz as Louis
- Robert Gist as Matthews
- Jack Grinnage as Leach
- Jack Orrison as Haskins
- Henry Rowland as Henderson
- Bob LaVarre as Crewmember

== Production ==
In September 1956 producer Lindsay Parsons announced he would make a film called The Far Wanderer from a script by Turney Walker. It was to be about seal hunting and star Sterling Hayden, also using Hayden's yacht. Filming was to begin in November 1956 and finance came from Allied Artists. Gregg G. Tallas was attached as director.

Eventually filming pushed back and Hayden dropped out, to be replaced by Barry Sullivan. However Hayden's yacht was still used. Filming began May 1958. The female lead went to Gita Hall, who was married to Sullivan at the time.

This was the sixth film version of London's novel. Larsen had been portrayed by Noah Beery Sr. in 1920 and Edward G. Robinson in 1941.
