= I Shot Billy the Kid =

1950 film by William Berke

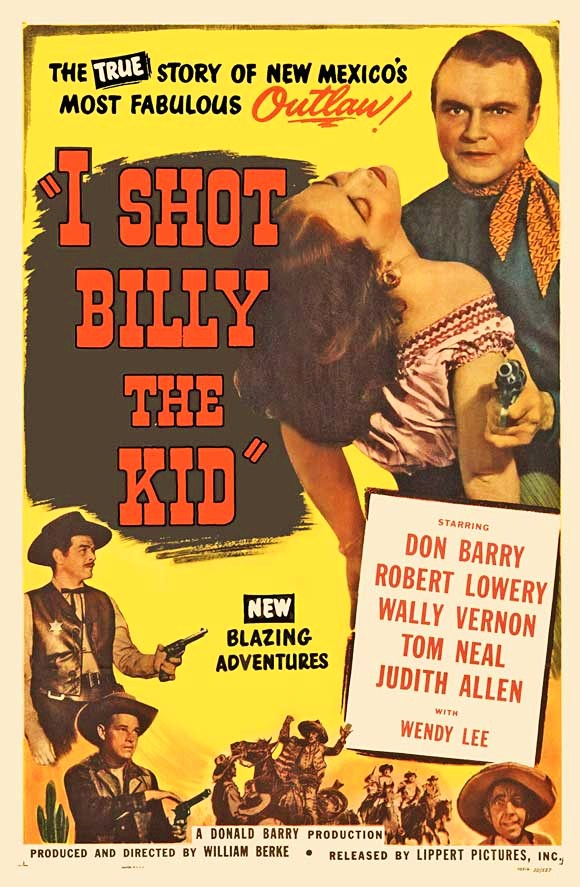
- Directed by: William Berke
- Written by: Orville Hampton
- Produced by: William Berke
- Starring: Don Barry
- Cinematography: Ernest Miller
- Music by: Albert Glasser
- Production company: Lippert Productions
- Distributed by: Lippert Pictures
- Release date: July 27, 1950
- Running time: 59 minutes
- Country: United States
- Language: English

I Shot Billy the Kid is a 1950 American Western film directed by William Berke for Lippert Pictures, which had previously released the successful I Shot Jesse James in 1948.

== Cast ==
- Don "Red" Barry as Billy the Kid
- Robert Lowery as Pat Garrett
- Wally Vernon as Vicenti
- Tom Neal as Charlie Bowdre
- Judith Allen as Mrs. Alec McSween
- Wendy Lee as Francesca
- Claude Stroud as General Lew Wallace
- John Merton as Ollinger
- Henry Marco as Juan
- Bill Kennedy as Poe
- Archie R. Twitchell as Grant
- Jack Perrin as Man
- Richard Farmer as McSween
