= The Diamond Queen (1953 film) =

1953 film by John Brahm

- Directed by: John Brahm
- Written by: Otto Englander
- Starring: Fernando Lamas; Arlene Dahl
- Cinematography: Stanley Cortez
- Edited by: Francis D. Lyon
- Music by: Paul Sawtell
- Production company: Melson Productions
- Distributed by: Warner Bros. Pictures
- Release date: November 28, 1953
- Running time: 80 minutes
- Country: United States
- Language: English

The Diamond Queen is a 1953 American adventure film directed by John Brahm. It stars Fernando Lamas and Arlene Dahl.

== Plot ==
Adventurer and gem expert Jean Baptiste Tavernier promises a diamond to cap King Louis XIV's crown for the coronation, but the reckless haste of the king's emissary, Baron Paul de Cabannes, causes the jewel to be cut badly and ruined.

Jean volunteers to travel to India to bring back another worthy stone. Cabannes insists on coming along and complicates the journey more than once before saving Jean's life and earning his respect.

The men are caught leering at a lovely woman bathing in a waterfall and are taken prisoner by her men. She is Queen Maya of Nepal. In the temple, Jean and Cabannes learn of the Eye of the Goddess, a rare blue diamond. It is in the possession of the Mogul of Golconda, who promises to give it to Queen Maya as a wedding gift, but secretly plans to take rule of her country.

With the use of a new "secret weapon," a prototype of hand grenade, the Frenchmen are able to overcome the Mogul's men in battle. The queen offers to give them the diamond, so in return they invite her to Louis's coronation.

== Cast ==
- Fernando Lamas as Jean Baptiste Tavernier
- Arlene Dahl as Queen Maya
- Gilbert Roland as Baron Paul de Cabannes
- Sheldon Leonard as Mogul
- Jay Novello as Gujar, Maya's steward

== Reception ==
Motion Picture Daily gave the film a mixed review, describing it as "diverting for its action, swordplay and outdoor sets but is standard in story and superficial in characterization." The review praised SuperCinecolor photography and the dancing of Sujata and Asoka.

Variety was mostly negative towards the film, the reviewer calling the swashbuckling, "more ludicrous than exciting, provoking laughter in the wrong places" and described the film as being for "the not-too-discriminating audience."
