= Salome (1953 film) =

1953 film

- Original film poster
- Directed by: William Dieterle
- Screenplay by: Harry Kleiner
- Story by: Jesse Lasky Jr. Harry Kleiner
- Produced by: Buddy Adler
- Starring: Rita Hayworth; Stewart Granger; Charles Laughton; Judith Anderson; Sir Cedric Hardwicke; Basil Sydney; Maurice Schwartz; Arnold Moss; Alan Badel
- Cinematography: Charles Lang
- Edited by: Viola Lawrence
- Music by: George Duning
- Color process: Technicolor
- Production company: The Beckworth Corporation
- Distributed by: Columbia Pictures
- Release date: March 24, 1953 (New York City)
- Running time: 103 minutes
- Country: United States
- Language: English
- Box office: $4.75 million (US); 3,0047,090 admissions (France)

Salome is a 1953 American drama Biblical film directed by William Dieterle and produced by Buddy Adler from a screenplay by Harry Kleiner and Jesse Lasky Jr. The music score was by George Duning, the dance music by Daniele Amfitheatrof and the cinematography by Charles Lang. Rita Hayworth's costumes were designed by Jean Louis. Hayworth's dances for this film were choreographed by Valerie Bettis. This film was the last produced by Hayworth's production company, the Beckworth Corporation.

The film stars Rita Hayworth as Salome, as well as Stewart Granger, Charles Laughton and Judith Anderson, with Cedric Hardwicke, Alan Badel and Basil Sydney.

== Plot ==
In Galilee, during the rule of Tiberius Caesar, King Herod and Queen Herodias sit on the throne and are condemned by John the Baptist, a prophet. John labels Herodias an adulteress for her marriage to Herod, her former husband's brother. Herod is not pleased with John condemning his rule, but fears facing the same fate his father suffered after ordering the murder of the land's firstborn males. The prophecy states that if a king of Judea kills the Messiah, he will suffer an agonizing death. Herod mistakenly believes John is the Messiah.

Marcellus, nephew of Caesar, petitions his uncle to marry Herodias's daughter, Salome, and receives a message stating that he is forbidden to marry a "barbarian." Salome is also sent a message stating that she is banished from Rome for seeking to rise above her station, and will be escorted back to Galilee, despite having lived in Rome since childhood.

On the boat escorting her home, Salome meets Claudius, a Roman soldier assigned to Herod's palace. Salome starts ordering people around. When Claudius disobeys her, she slaps him. He interrupts her angry tirade by stealing a kiss, which shocks her.

Herodias greets her daughter at the palace and becomes aware that Herod lusts after his stepdaughter/niece. The queen starts thinking about using Herod's lust to manipulate him. Meanwhile, Salome sneaks into the marketplace with several servants to hear John speak. When he calls Herodias an adulteress, Salome repudiates him, inadvertently revealing her identity. She is then spared from the angry crowd by John, who calms them and denounces violence. An upset Salome implores Herodias to leave Galilee with her, not wanting her mother to be stoned to death. Trapped in a loveless and potentially deadly marriage to Herod, Herodias refuses, wishing to preserve the throne for Salome's sake. Salome does not care about the throne but cannot convince Herodias of leaving. Knowing of Claudius's feelings for her, Salome seductively beguiles him in an attempt to have him arrest John. Claudius, however, refuses.

Shortly after, Herod decides to arrest John, ostensibly for treason but in reality to protect him from the actions of Herodias, who has attempted to have him assassinated. Having converted to Christianity, Claudius rushes to Herod to plead for John's release, to no avail. He then travels to Jerusalem to save him.

Meanwhile, to seduce Salome, Herod attempts to gift her a necklace. Knowing the implications of his gift, she rejects it. Claudius meets with Pontius Pilate in Jerusalem, who refuses to release John because he preaches against Rome, which is treasonous. Claudius attempts to persuade Pilate to join him as a champion of John's new religion. Shocked, Pilate relieves Claudius from his post and forbids him from returning to Galilee.

During their talk, Claudius learns of a miracle worker and decides to visit him. He then returns to the palace and meets Salome. During his departure, Herodias has manipulated Salome into thinking that the only way she can save her mother's life is by dancing for Herod. Salome is appalled by this, as it would mean surrendering her will and body to Herod. She pleads with Claudius to take her from Galilee, but he says he needs to reveal something first. He then leads Salome to John's cell and reveals himself as a Christian. Claudius tells them of the miracle worker, whom John recognizes as the Messiah. John's faith moves Salome, who resolves to save his life.

Against Claudius's wishes, Salome dances for Herod while removing layers of clothing. At the end of her dance she will ask him to set John free. Herod, enthralled by her, offhandedly muses that he would give half his kingdom for Salome. Seated beside him, Herodias seizes the chance to ask him to order John's death. John is beheaded before Salome finishes her dance. Horrified, she renounces Herodias and, like Claudius, becomes a Christian. Together, Salome and Claudius later listen to Christ delivering the Sermon on the Mount.

== Cast ==
- Rita Hayworth as Princess Salome
- Stewart Granger as Commander Claudius
- Charles Laughton as King Herod
- Judith Anderson as Queen Herodias
- Sir Cedric Hardwicke as Tiberius Caesar
- Alan Badel as John the Baptist
- Basil Sydney as Pontius Pilate
- Maurice Schwartz as Ezra the King's Advisor
- Arnold Moss as Micha the Queen's Advisor
- Asoka as Oriental Dancer
- Sujata as Oriental Dancer

== Production ==
The original title of the film was Salome – Dance of the Seven Veils. The film was based on the book The Good Tidings by William Sidney; Robert Ardrey wrote the first script. It was made for Rita Hayworth's own company, Beckworth Productions, for Columbia Pictures.

According to her biographers, Hayworth's erotic Dance of the Seven Veils routine was "the most demanding of her entire career", necessitating "endless takes and retakes".

Stewart Granger was borrowed from MGM for the male lead.

== Reception ==
The film was a big hit in France, with admissions of 3,047,090.

Bosley Crowther of The New York Times called the film "a lush conglomeration of historical pretenses and make-believe, pseudo-religious ostentation and just plain insinuated sex" with "a righteously sanctimonious air, suggesting the whole thing is intended to be taken on a high religious plane." Variety wrote that Hayworth's performance was "among her best," but "the film doesn't deliver on the promised sex-religion combo and needs more hokum, spectacle and excitement to click with the regular run of filmgoers." Edwin Schallert of the Los Angeles Times called the film "a gaudy and garish affair" with its primary weakness being "discovering just what sort of a woman Salome is supposed really to be. Neither story creators nor Rita herself cast too much light on that." Orval Hopkins of The Washington Post called it "gee-whiz picture" with "tremendous" color shots, "startling" scenes aboard the Roman galley and some acting "of the scenery-chewing variety. Altogether, this is a whale of a spectacle." Harrison's Reports declared, "It is a fairly spectacular production, has fine photography, and considerable sex exposure, but the story does not touch one's heartstrings." The Monthly Film Bulletin wrote, "Salome seems wholly fake, even its vulgarity strikes one as lifeless ... Rita Hayworth, though she performs her dances like a Trojan, seems sadly to have lost her earlier vitality. The generally oppressive and shoddy atmosphere, in fact, is relieved only by hilarious over-playing by Judith Anderson as Herodias."
