= A Southern Yankee =

1948 film by Edward Sedgwick

- 1948 Theatrical Poster
- Directed by: Edward Sedgwick; S. Sylvan Simon (uncredited)
- Written by: Melvin Frank; Norman Panama (From an Original Story); Nat Perrin, Buster Keaton, Edward Sedgwick (uncredited)
- Screenplay by: Harry Tugend
- Based on: The General; 1926 film by Buster Keaton
- Produced by: Paul Jones
- Starring: Red Skelton; Brian Donlevy; Arlene Dahl
- Cinematography: Ray June
- Edited by: Ben Lewis
- Music by: David Snell
- Color process: Black and white
- Production company: Metro-Goldwyn-Mayer
- Distributed by: Loew's, Inc.
- Release date: August 5, 1948
- Running time: 90 minutes
- Country: United States
- Language: English
- Budget: $1,482,000
- Box office: $2,547,000

A Southern Yankee is a 1948 American comedy Western film directed by Edward Sedgwick and starring Red Skelton, Brian Donlevy and Arlene Dahl.

The film is loosely based on Buster Keaton's The General (1926). Skelton plays a Union soldier who spies on the Confederacy during the American Civil War. Keaton made contributions in post-production, and the film was partially remade with his new sequences.

== Plot ==
In 1865, Aubrey Filmore works as a bellboy at the Palmer Hotel in St. Louis. Aubrey wants to work as a spy for the federal government and contacts Colonel Clifford M. Baker at the Secret Service to ask if he can help their elite spy unit, but Baker refuses the request.

Posters are distributed warning the public of a cunning spy named the Grey Spider. When Major Jack Drumman comes to stay at the hotel, Aubrey discovers that he is the Grey Spider, but the major catches Aubrey and tries to force him to wear Confederate clothes to look like the Grey Spider so that he can shoot him as a spy.

Before the major's plan is realized, Aubrey accidentally knocks him unconscious. Major Drumman's alluring accomplice Sallyann Weatharby enters and Aubrey falls in love with her. Aubrey agrees to join Sallyann, posing as the Drumman, to a meeting with important Confederate spies.

Before Aubrey leaves the hotel, he leaves a message for Baker telling him of his plans. Aubrey is then involved in a complicated scheme to intercept the Union forces and is given the important task of delivering the Union battle plans to the Confederate General Watkins. He is ordered to meet up with Sallyann at Morgan's Landing, a hospital near the battlefront.

Upon returning to Colonel Baker with the plans, Aubrey helps to make fake plans to replace the real ones, and is reluctantly ordered by the colonel to continue posing as Drumman and also to deliver instructions to a Union spy. Aubrey mixes up the plans and instructions and because he is wearing Confederate and Union uniforms at the same time, both armies shoot at him and he is knocked unconscious. He is carried to Morgan's Landing and Sallyann is there waiting for him as planned.

Sallyann's fiancé Kurt Devlynn, who is also a spy, is there. As Sallyann has fallen in love with Aubrey, she tells Kurt that she now loves Drumman. Aubrey wakes, finds the lost instructions and escapes the hospital.

Kurt tells his men to dress in Union uniforms and intercept Aubrey (whom he believes to be Drumman) to steal the battle plans. When arriving at Sallyann's father's plantation, Aubrey mistakenly delivers the spy instructions instead of the plans, and Union spies steal the plans and Confederate spies retrieve them. General Watkins receives the plans and Aubrey's Union spy contact Captain Lorford receives the instructions.

That night, Aubrey is courting Sallyann when he is supposed to be stealing the plans from the general. The Confederates realize that a Union spy is in the house and set a trap to catch him. But instead of catching Aubrey, they catch the real Grey Spider, Drumman, believing that he is a Union spy.

As everyone thinks that the Union spy has been caught, Aubrey is able to get the plans from General Watkins. But soon after, Drumman's father appears and exposes Aubrey. When Aubrey is brought outside to be executed for treason, he is saved by Sallyann, and end of the war is declared.

== Cast ==
- Red Skelton as Aubrey Filmore
- Brian Donlevy as Kurt Devlynn
- Arlene Dahl as Sallyann Weatharby
- George Coulouris as Maj. Jack Drumman aka The Grey Spider
- Lloyd Gough as Capt. Steve Lorford
- John Ireland as Capt. Jed Calbern
- Minor Watson as Gen. Watkins
- Charles Dingle as Col. Weatherby
- Art Baker as Col. Clifford M. Baker
- Reed Hadley as Fred Munsey
- Arthur Space as Mark Haskins
- Joyce Compton as Hortense Dobson

== Production ==
The original screenplay was called The Spy. Author Michael Zmuda has revealed that S. Sylvan Simon directed the film in its entirety, despite Sedgwick's screen credit. A more recent source confirms Zmuda's discovery but adds more context. According to Keaton biographer James Curtis, Simon had indeed filmed A Southern Yankee in its entirety, but it previewed so poorly that producer Paul Jones asked Buster Keaton and Edward Sedgwick to add new gags, and writer Nat Perrin to insert their material into a revised script. Between them they fashioned 40 pages of sight gags, including a horse-and-buggy chase and a Civil War skirmish (that Red Skelton halts by carrying both Union and Confederate flags). Sedgwick directed the retakes, which saved the film, and received sole credit as director.

== Reception ==
The film earned $1,981,000 in the U.S. and Canada and $566,000 elsewhere, resulting in a profit of $263,000.

== See also ==
- List of American films of 1948
- List of films and television shows about the American Civil War
