= Arlene Dahl =

American actress (1925–2021)

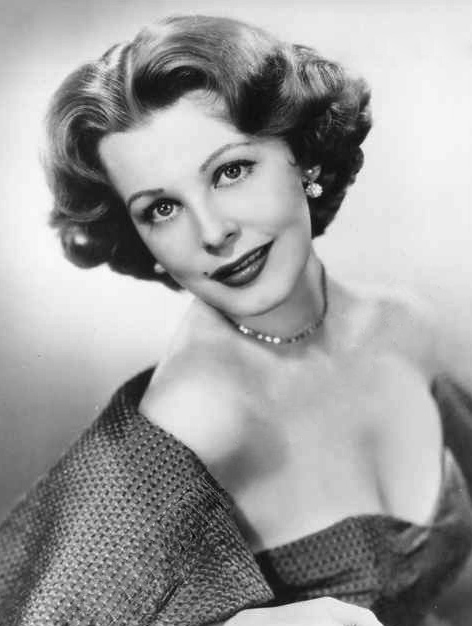
- Dahl in 1953
- Born: Arlene Carol Dahl; August 11, 1925; Minneapolis, Minnesota, U.S.
- Died: November 29, 2021 (aged 96); New York City, U.S.
- Occupations: Actress; businesswoman; author
- Years active: 1944–2012
- Spouses: Lex Barker (m. 1951; div. 1952) Fernando Lamas (m. 1954; div. 1960) Christian R. Holmes (m. 1960; div. 1964) Alexis Lichine (m. 1964; div. 1969) Rounsevelle W. Schaum (m. 1969; div. 1976) Marc Rosen (m. 1984)
- Children: 3, including Lorenzo Lamas
- Relatives: AJ Lamas (grandson); Shayne Lamas (granddaughter)

Arlene Carol Dahl (August 11, 1925 – November 29, 2021) was an American actress active in films from the late 1940s. Born in Minnesota to parents of Norwegian descent, Dahl started her acting career in musicals before transitioning to film, where she gained significant roles in MGM productions such as My Wild Irish Rose (1947) and The Bride Goes Wild (1948). She also starred in the adventure films Caribbean Gold (1952) and Desert Legion (1953).

Dahl was an entrepreneur who founded two companies, Arlene Dahl Enterprises and Dahlia, a fragrance company. Despite her acting success, she faced financial challenges, declaring bankruptcy in 1981. She then entered the field of astrology, writing a syndicated column and operating a premium phoneline company. She also wrote numerous books on beauty and astrology.

In her personal life, Dahl had six husbands, including actors Lex Barker and Fernando Lamas, and was the mother to three children, the eldest of whom is actor Lorenzo Lamas. She lived between New York City and West Palm Beach, Florida, until her death in 2021.

== Early life ==
Dahl was born on August 11, 1925, in Minneapolis, Minnesota, to Idelle (née Swan) and Rudolph Dahl, a Ford Motor dealer and executive. Her parents were both of Norwegian descent. She cited her year of birth as 1928, although her birth record (1925-43442, available through the Minnesota Historical Society) shows she was born on August 11, 1925. An August 13, 2014, article in the New York Social Diary by David Patrick Columbia, titled "Losses and Gains", references her 89th birthday celebration with her husband, children, and family.

As a child, Dahl took elocution and dancing lessons and was active in theatrical events at Margaret Fuller Elementary School, Ramsey Junior High School, and Washburn Senior High School. After graduating from high school, she performed in a local drama group and briefly worked as a model for department stores. Dahl's mother was involved in local amateur theatre. Dahl briefly attended the University of Minnesota.

== Acting career ==
=== Early career ===
A year after graduation from high school, Dahl lived in Chicago, where she worked as a buyer for Marshall and Brown. She then traveled to New York City and worked as a model for the Walter Thornton Model Agency, where she successfully auditioned for a part in the musical Mr. Strauss Goes to Boston in 1945. This led to her gaining the lead in another play, Questionable Ladies, which was seen by a talent scout from Hollywood.

Dahl had an uncredited bit part in Life with Father (1947). She was promoted to leading lady in My Wild Irish Rose (1947) with Dennis Morgan, a big hit that led to an offer from MGM for a long-term contract.

=== MGM ===
Dahl began working for MGM to play a supporting role in her first film, The Bride Goes Wild (1948), starring Van Johnson and June Allyson. She remained there to play the female lead in the Red Skelton comedy A Southern Yankee (1948).

Eagle-Lion hired her to star as the female lead in Reign of Terror (1949). Then at MGM, she acted opposite Van Johnson in Scene of the Crime (1949); Robert Taylor in Ambush (1950); Joel McCrea in The Outriders (1950); Fred Astaire and Skelton in Three Little Words (1950), playing Eileen Percy; and Skelton again in Watch the Birdie (1950). Except for The Outriders, all these movies were profitable for MGM.

MGM gave Dahl the lead in several B movies, such as Inside Straight (1951) and No Questions Asked (1951), both of which flopped.

=== Adventure films ===
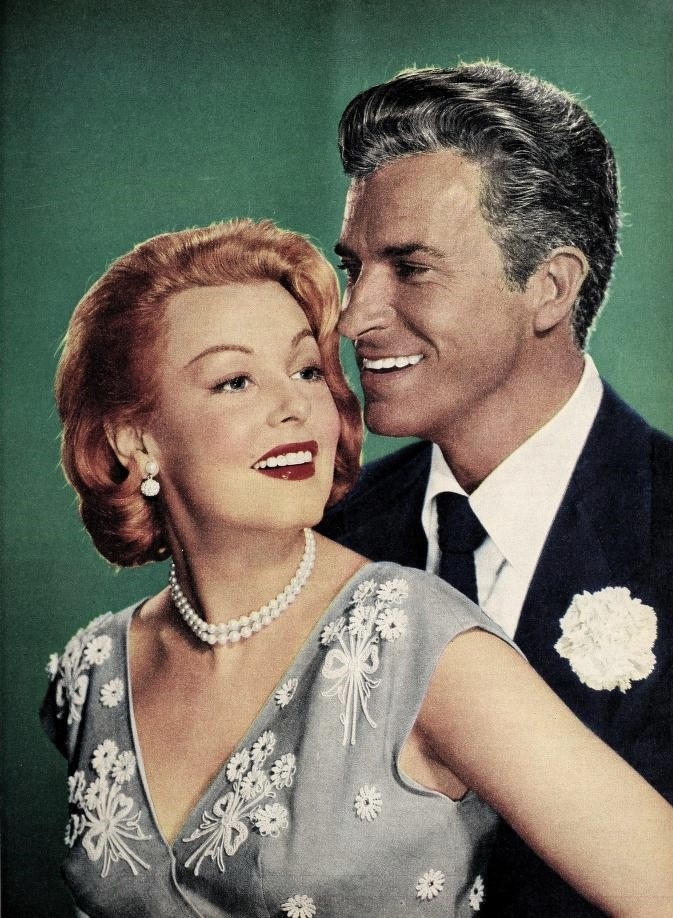
Dahl and Fernando Lamas, by Virgil Apger, 1954

Dahl was hired by Pine-Thomas Productions to a multiple-picture contract. She was cast in Caribbean Gold (1952), a swashbuckler starring John Payne.

She went to Universal-International to co-star with Alan Ladd in a French Foreign Legion story, Desert Legion (1953); then Pine-Thomas used her again in Jamaica Run (1953) and Sangaree (1953). The latter starred Fernando Lamas, whom Dahl later married.

She supported Bob Hope in the comedy Here Come the Girls (1953). Dahl and Lamas reunited on The Diamond Queen (1953) at Warner Bros. In 1953, Dahl played Roxanne on stage in a short-lived revival of Cyrano de Bergerac opposite Jose Ferrer.

Dahl played the ambitious Carol Talbot in Woman's World (1954) at Fox, and she was Rock Hudson's leading lady in Universal's adventure war film Bengal Brigade (1954).

She began writing a syndicated beauty column in 1952, and opened Arlene Dahl Enterprises in 1954, marketing cosmetics and designer lingerie.

Dahl began appearing on television, including episodes of Lux Video Theatre (including a 1954 adaptation of Casablanca, wherein she played Ilsa) and The Ford Television Theatre.

Dahl was both a mystery guest (April 25, 1954) and a panelist on the CBS game show What's My Line?. In 1953, she hosted ABC's anthology series The Pepsi-Cola Playhouse.

John Payne and Dahl were reunited in a film noir, Slightly Scarlet (1956), alongside Rhonda Fleming, another red-haired star.

Dahl made some films in England for Columbia: Wicked as They Come (1956) and Fortune Is a Woman (1957). In 1957, she sued Columbia for $1 million, saying the film's advertisements for Wicked as They Come were "lewd" and "degraded" her. A judge threw out the suit.

Dahl hosted the short-lived television series Opening Night (1958) and had the female lead in the adventure movie Journey to the Center of the Earth (1959), opposite James Mason and Pat Boone. She fainted from doing the whirlpool scene in the latter, but it turned out to be one of her most successful films.

=== 1960s ===
In 1960, she appeared in the TV series Riverboat in the role of Lucy Belle in the episode "That Taylor Affair". The same year, she married Texas oilman Christian Holmes and announced her retirement from acting. The marriage did not last, but Dahl increasingly diversified her work to become a lecturer and beauty consultant while she continued acting.

She had a supporting role in Kisses for My President (1964) and appeared in Land Raiders (1969), The Pleasure Pit (1969), and the French film Du blé en liasses. She also appeared on TV in Burke's Law and Theatre of Stars.

Her focus by now was on business. After closing her company in 1967, she began serving as vice president at the advertising agency Kenyon and Eckhardt that same year. In a 1969 interview, she said her old films were "such an embarrassment".

=== 1970s ===
Dahl also returned to Broadway in the early 1970s, replacing Lauren Bacall in the role of Margo Channing in Applause.

On television, she had a role on the soap opera One Life to Live and guest-starred on Love, American Style, Jigsaw John, Fantasy Island, and The Love Boat. She also made a TV movie, The Deadly Dream (1971). "I like acting," she said in 1978, "but I had better like business better or I'll lose my shirt."

=== 1980s and 1990s ===
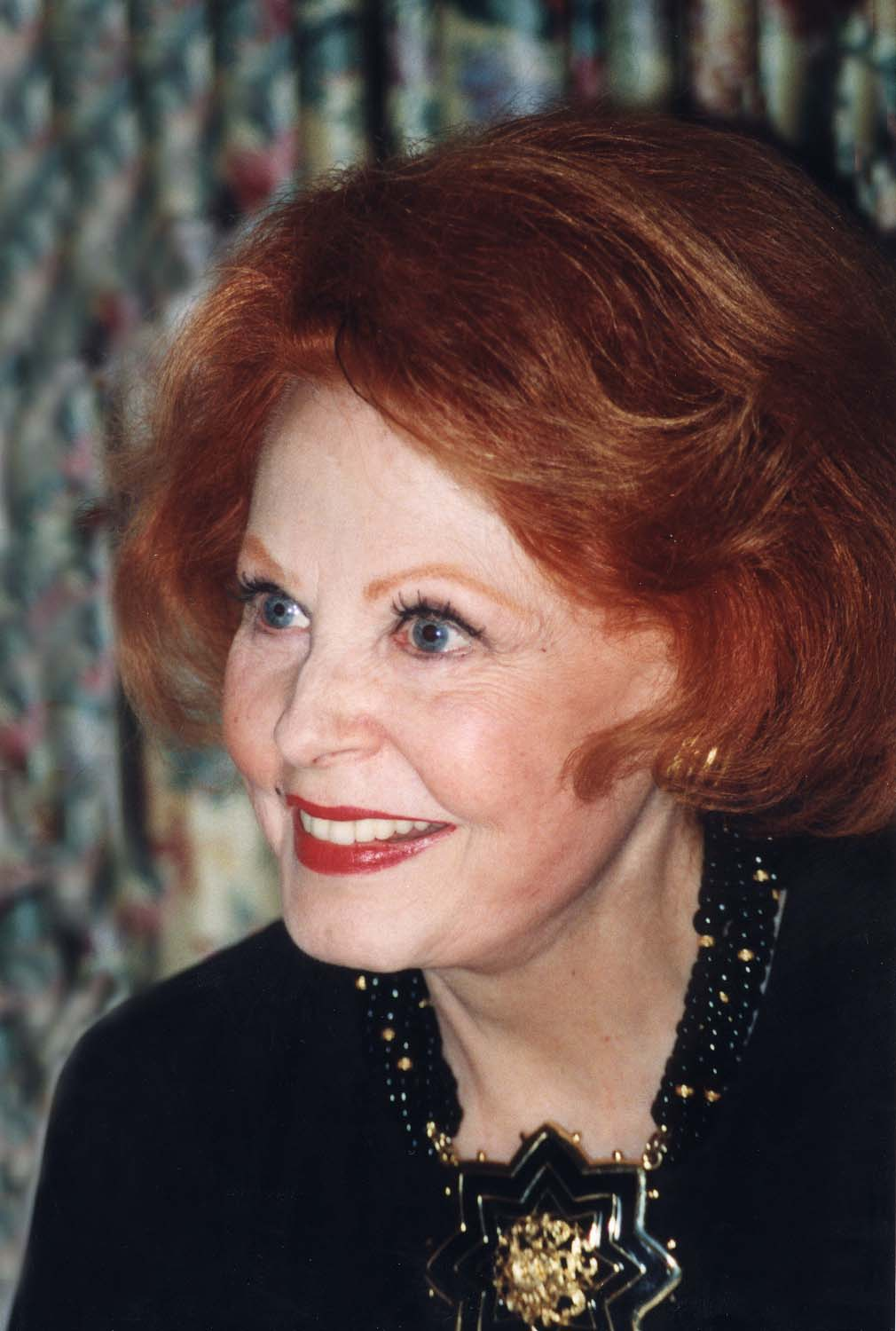
Dahl in 2000

In 1981, Dahl declared personal bankruptcy, with liabilities of almost $1 million and assets of only $623,970. Her chief creditor was the U.S. Small Business Administration, which guaranteed a $450,000 loan for her as an executive in a cosmetics firm. She had lost $163,000 from burglaries of jewelry and furs from her Manhattan apartment, and she earned only $11,367 in 1980 and $10,517 in 1979.

Dahl appeared on ABC's soap opera One Life to Live from 1981 to 1984 as Lucinda Schenck Wilson. The character was planned as a short-term role (she guest-starred from late 1981 to early 1982 and in late 1982), but Dahl later was offered a one-year contract to appear on the series from September 1983 to October 1984. In 1988, she starred in the film A Place to Hide.

Her last feature film role, which followed a hiatus of more than two decades, was in Night of the Warrior (1991). It co-starred her son Lorenzo Lamas.

She entered the field of astrology in the 1980s, writing a syndicated column and later operating a premium phoneline company. Dahl wrote more than two dozen books on the topics of beauty and astrology.

Dahl guest-starred on episodes of shows starring her son, Renegade and Air America.

== Business ventures ==
In 1951, Dahl began writing for a triweekly beauty column for Let's Be Beautiful, a newspaper owned by Chicago Tribune founder Robert McCormick.

In the mid-1950s, Dahl founded Arlene Dahl Enterprises, selling lingerie, nightgowns, pajamas, and cosmetics. She invented the Dahl Beauty Cap, a knitted sleeping cap for women.

Dahl began working at Sears Roebuck as director of beauty products in 1970, earning nearly $750,000 annually, but she left in 1975 to found a short-lived fragrance company, Dahlia.

== Personal life ==
Dahl had six husbands:

1. Actor Lex Barker: They met in the early 1950s, wed on April 16, 1951, and divorced the following year (Barker later married Lana Turner).
2. Actor Fernando Lamas: They married in 1954. In 1958, Dahl and Lamas had their only child, Lorenzo Lamas. Shortly after giving birth to Lorenzo, Dahl slowed and eventually ended her career as an actress, although she still appeared in films and on television occasionally. Dahl and Lamas divorced in 1960.
3. Christian R. Holmes: He was heir to the Fleischmann yeast fortune and an oilman. They married on October 15, 1960, and had one child, Dahl's only daughter. Holmes and she were divorced November 29, 1963.
4. Russian wine writer and entrepreneur Alexis Lichine. They were married from 1964 to 1969.
5. TV producer/yacht broker Rounsevelle W. "Skip" Schaum: They were married from 1969 to 1976. Her second son was born during this marriage.
6. Packaging designer Marc Rosen: They were married from 1984 until her death. She divided her time between New York City and West Palm Beach, Florida.

She has nine grandchildren (including AJ Lamas and Shayne Lamas) and two great-grandchildren.

She died in her Manhattan apartment on November 29, 2021, at age 96.

== Filmography ==
Year	Title	Role
1947	My Wild Irish Rose	Rose Donovan
1948	The Bride Goes Wild	Tillie Smith Oliver
1948	A Southern Yankee	Sallyann Weatharby
1949	Scene of the Crime	Gloria Conovan
1949	Reign of Terror	Madelon
1950	Ambush	Ann Duverall
1950	The Outriders	Jen Gort
1950	Three Little Words	Eileen Percy
1950	Watch the Birdie	Lucia Corlone
1951	Inside Straight	Lily Douvane
1951	No Questions Asked	Ellen Sayburn Jessman
1952	Caribbean Gold	Christine Barclay McAllister
1953	Desert Legion	Morjana
1953	Jamaica Run	Ena Dacey
1953	Sangaree	Nancy Darby
1953	Here Come the Girls	Irene Bailey
1953	The Diamond Queen	Queen Maya
1954	Woman's World	Carol Talbot
1954	Bengal Brigade	Vivian Morrow
1956	Slightly Scarlet	Dorothy Allen
1956	Wicked as They Come	Kathleen "Kathy" Allen
1957	Fortune Is a Woman	Sarah Moreton Branwell (Note: Released in the United States as She Played with Fire (1958))
1959	Journey to the Center of the Earth	Carla Göteborg
1964	Kisses for My President	Doris Reid Weaver
1967	Les Poneyttes	Shoura Cassidy
1969	The Pleasure Pit	Laureen
1970	Land Raiders	Martha Cardenas
1991	Night of the Warrior	Edie Keane
2003	Broadway: The Golden Age, by the Legends Who Were There	Herself

=== Television work ===
Year	Title	Role	Notes
1953–1954	The Pepsi-Cola Playhouse	Host	
1954–1955	Lux Video Theatre	Ilsa Lund	Episodes: "Casablanca" and "September Affair"
1954–1955	The Ford Television Theatre	Mary McNeil/Jody Hill	2 episodes
1958	Opening Night	Host	(canceled after a few weeks)
1963–1965	Burke's Law	Princess Kortzoff/Eva Martinelli/Gloria Cooke/Maggie French	4 episodes
1965	Bob Hope Presents the Chrysler Theatre	Valerie	Episode: "Perilous Time"
1971	The Deadly Dream	Connie	Television movie
1976	Jigsaw John		Episode: "Sand Trap"
1979–1987	The Love Boat	Monica Cross/Natalie Martin/Ellen Kirkwood/Jessica York	4 episodes
1981	Fantasy Island	Amelia Shelby	1 Episode
1981–1984	One Life to Live	Lucinda Schenk Wilson	
1995–1997	Renegade	Virginia Biddle/Elaine Carlisle	2 episodes
1995	All My Children	Lady Lucille	
1999	Air America	Cynthia Garland	Episode: "Eye of the Storm"

== Radio appearances ==
Year	Program	Episode/source
1953	Broadway Playhouse	"No Man of Her Own"
1953	Stars over Hollywood	"Remember Bill"

== Bibliography ==
- Always Ask a Man: Arlene Dahl's Key to Femininity. Englewood Cliffs: Prentice Hall. 1965. OCLC 4511224.
- Arlene Dahl's Lovescopes. Indianapolis: Bobbs-Merrill. 1983. ISBN 0-672-52770-7.
- Beyond Beauty. New York: Simon & Schuster. 1980. ISBN 0-671-24555-4.
