= Edward Ludwig =

American film director

- On the set of Big Jim McLain, 1952
- Born: Isidor Litwack; October 7, 1899; Balta, Podolia Governorate, Russian Empire
- Died: August 20, 1982 (aged 82); Santa Monica, California, U.S.
- Occupations: Film director; writer
- Years active: 1921–1963

Edward Irving Ludwig (October 7, 1899 – August 20, 1982) was a Russian-born American film director and writer. He directed nearly 100 films between 1921 and 1963 (some under the names Edward I. Luddy and Charles Fuhr).

== Life ==
Edward Ludwig was born Isidor Litwack in Ukraine, then part of the Russian Empire, entered the United States from Canada on March 6, 1911, became a naturalized citizen December 23, 1932, and died in 1982 in Santa Monica, California, at age 82.

== Partial filmography ==
- Rip Van Winkle (1921)
- The Man Who Waited (1922)
- What an Eye (1924) a haunted house comedy for Universal Pictures
- The Irresistible Lover (1927)
- Spuds (1927)
- Jake the Plumber (1927)
- The Girl from Woolworth's (1929)
- See America Thirst (1930)
- Steady Company (1932)
- They Just Had to Get Married (1932)
- A Woman's Man (1934)
- Let's Be Ritzy (1934)
- Friends of Mr. Sweeney (1934)
- The Man Who Reclaimed His Head (1934)
- Age of Indiscretion (1935)
- Three Kids and a Queen (1935)
- Old Man Rhythm (1935)
- Adventure in Manhattan (1936)
- Fatal Lady (1936)
- The Last Gangster (1937)
- Her Husband Lies (1937)
- That Certain Age (1938)
- Coast Guard (1939)
- Swiss Family Robinson (1940)
- The Man Who Lost Himself (1941)
- Born to Sing (1942)
- They Came to Blow Up America (1943)
- Bomber's Moon (co-director credited as "Charles Fuhr"; 1943)
- The Fighting Seabees (1944) with John Wayne
- Three Is a Family (1944)
- The Fabulous Texan (1947)
- Wake of the Red Witch (1948) with John Wayne
- The Big Wheel (1949)
- Smuggler's Island (1951)
- Caribbean (1952)
- The Blazing Forest (1952)
- Sangaree (1953)
- The Vanquished (1953)
- Jivaro (1954)
- Flame of the Islands (1956)
- The Black Scorpion (1957)
- New Comedy Showcase (TV series, 1960, Season 1 Episode 7: "Maisie")
- The Gun Hawk (1963)
