= Caribbean Gold =

1952 film by Edward Ludwig

Caribbean (aka:Caribbean Gold)
- Movie poster
- Directed by: Edward Ludwig
- Written by: Frank L. Moss; Edward Ludwig
- Based on: Carib Gold by Ellery Clark
- Produced by: William H. Pine; William C. Thomas
- Starring: John Payne; Arlene Dahl; Sir Cedric Hardwicke
- Cinematography: Lionel Lindon
- Edited by: Howard A. Smith
- Music by: Lucien Cailliet
- Production company: Pine-Thomas Productions
- Distributed by: Paramount Pictures
- Release date: September 1952
- Running time: 91 minutes
- Country: United States
- Language: English
- Box office: $1.4 million

Caribbean Gold (also known as Caribbean) is a 1952 American swashbuckler adventure film directed by Edward Ludwig and starring John Payne, Arlene Dahl and Cedric Hardwicke. The film was produced by Pine-Thomas Productions for distribution by Paramount Pictures and was based on the novel Carib Gold by Ellery Clark. The film's sets were designed by the art director Hal Pereira.

== Plot ==
In 1728, Dick Lindsay is taken prisoner by Captain Barclay and incarcerated aboard the Black Panther, his pirate ship. Also on board against his will is Robert MacAllister, nephew of Barclay's nemesis, Andrew MacAllister.

The pirate kidnapped Robert as retribution for MacAllister having long ago done likewise to Barclay's infant daughter, Christine. The feud has continued for more than 20 years. Now the pirate intends to settle it once and for all. He propositions Dick to impersonate Robert and return to his uncle, going so far as to duplicate a distinctive scar on Robert's face.

Dick does as told, hoping to gain his freedom. He is a welcome sight to MacAllister, but others are not quite sure what to make of this newcomer, including Shively, a brutal overseer of the men, and particularly Christine, now a grown woman with a volatile disposition.

Put in charge of the mill, Dick gains the trust of MacAllister's slaves, who are plotting a revolt. The real Robert's dead body washes up, however, so MacAllister now knows he is being deceived. Christine's growing love for Dick is a factor in not having him killed at first, but soon Shively and Dick are engaged in a knife fight to the death.

Captain Barclay and his men await a signal to invade the island. When a stash of explosives is detonated, they storm the isle. MacAllister is killed by Barclay, who is savoring his revenge when Christine gains some of her own, mortally wounding Barclay. She remains unaware that she has just killed her own father, and with his dying words, Barclay implores Dick to keep it a secret.

== Cast ==
- John Payne as Dick Lindsay / Robert MacAllister
- Arlene Dahl as Christine Barclay MacAllister
- Cedric Hardwicke as Captain Francis Barclay
- Francis L. Sullivan as Andrew MacAllister
- Willard Parker as Shively
- Dennis Hoey as Burford
- Clarence Muse as Quashy
- William Pullen as Robert MacAllister
- Walter Reed as Evans
- Ramsay Hill as Townsend
- John Hart as Stuart
- Zora Donahoo as Elizabeth
- Woody Strode as Esau
- Ezeret Anderson as Cudjo
- Kermit Pruitt as Quarino
- Dan Ferniel as Caesar
- Rosalind Hayes as Sally

== Production ==
The script is based on a 1926 novel by Ellery Clark titled Carib Gold.

In January 1951, the film rights were bought by Pine-Thomas Productions, which had a deal to produce films for Paramount. Mark Stevens was to star and Edward Ludwig to direct. However, by March, Stevens had withdrawn and the film was to star John Payne, who had appeared in several films for Pine-Thomas. Curtis Kenyon and Morton Grant were hired to write the script.

In June 1951, Payne signed a contract with Pine-Thomas to star in two films per year for three years. The first were to be Green Gold of Nevada (later retitled Timber Man) and Caribbean Gold.

In July, Arlene Dahl was announced as Payne's costar. The film was the first of her three-year Pine-Thomas contract.

Filming was to begin in October 1951, but Paramount, which was contending with a backlog of unreleased films, asked Pine-Thomas to push the start of production until January 1952.

== Reception ==
The film earned an estimated $1.4 million at the American box office in 1952.
