= List of science fiction films of the 1950s =

A list of science fiction films released in the 1950s. These films include core elements of science fiction, but can cross into other genres. They have been released to a cinema audience by the commercial film industry and are widely distributed with reviews by reputable critics.

This period is sometimes described as the 'classic' or 'golden' era of science fiction theater. With at least 204 sci-fi films produced, it holds the record for the largest number of science fiction produced per decade. Much of the production was in a low-budget form, targeted at a teenage audience. Many were formulaic, gimmicky, comic book-style films. They drew upon political themes or public concerns of the day, including depersonalization, infiltration, or fear of nuclear weapons. Invasion was a common theme, as were various threats to humanity.

Four films from this decade, Destination Moon (1950), When Worlds Collide (1951), The War of the Worlds (1953) and 20,000 Leagues Under the Sea (1954) won Academy Awards, while Journey to the Center of the Earth (1959), Forbidden Planet (1956), On the Beach (1959) and Them! (1954) received nominations. Destination Moon, The War of the Worlds and The Incredible Shrinking Man (1957) won the Hugo Award.

== List ==
1950
Title	Director	Cast	Country	Subgenre/Notes
Destination Moon	Irving Pichel	Warner Anderson, John Archer, Tom Powers, Dick Wesson	United States	Adventure Drama Thriller (Note: Winner of a Retroactive Hugo Award in 2001.)
Flying Disc Man from Mars	Fred C. Brannon	Kent Fowler, Gregory Gaye	United States	Action Adventure Crime Fantasy Serial film
The Flying Saucer	Mikel Conrad	Mikel Conrad, Pat Garrison, Hanz von Teuffen	United States	Thriller
The Invisible Monster	Fred C. Brannon	Stanley Price, Richard Webb, Aline Towne, Lane Bradford	United States	Action Adventure Crime Thriller Serial film
Rocketship X-M	Kurt Neumann	Lloyd Bridges, Osa Massen, John Emery	United States	Family
1951
Title	Director	Cast	Country	Subgenre/Notes
Abbott and Costello Meet the Invisible Man	Charles Lamont	Bud Abbott, Lou Costello, Nancy Guild	United States	Comedy Family Sport
Captain Video: Master of the Stratosphere	Spencer Gordon Bennet, Wallace Grissell	Judd Holdren, Gene Roth	United States	Adventure Serial film
The Day the Earth Stood Still	Robert Wise	Michael Rennie, Patricia Neal, Hugh Marlowe, Sam Jaffe	United States	Drama (Note: Winner of a Golden Globe Award for Best Film Promoting International Understanding in 1951.)
Five	Arch Oboler	William Phipps, Susan Douglas, James Anderson	United States	Drama Horror
Flight to Mars	Lesley Selander	Marguerite Chapman, Cameron Mitchell, Arthur Franz	United States	Drama
I'll Never Forget You	Roy Ward Baker	Tyrone Power, Ann Blyth	United States	
Lost Continent	Sam Newfield	Cesar Romero, Hillary Brooke, Chick Chandler	United States	Adventure Fantasy
Lost Planet Airmen	Fred C. Brannon	Tristram Coffin, Mae Clarke, I. Stanford Jolley	United States	Superhero (Note: Feature version of the 1949 serial King of the Rocket Men.)
The Man from Planet X	Edgar G. Ulmer	Robert Clarke, Margaret Field, Raymond Bond	United States	Horror Romance Thriller
The Man in the White Suit	Alexander Mackendrick	Alec Guinness, Joan Greenwood, Cecil Parker, Michael Gough, Ernest Thesiger	United Kingdom	Comedy Drama
Mysterious Island	Spencer Gordon Bennet	Richard Crane, Marshall Reed, Karen Randle, Ralph Hodges	United States	Action Family Serial film
Superman and the Mole Men	Lee Sholem	George Reeves, Phyllis Coates, Jeff Corey	United States	Action Adventure Drama Family Fantasy Romance
The Thing from Another World	Christian Nyby	Margaret Sheridan, Kenneth Tobey, Robert Cornthwaite	United States	Horror
Two Lost Worlds	Norman Dawn, Norman Kennedy	James Arness, Laura Elliott	United States	Adventure Romance
Unknown World (a.k.a. Night Without Stars)	Terrell O. Morse	Bruce Kellogg, Marilyn Nash, Jim Bannon, Otto Waldis	United States	Adventure
When Worlds Collide	Rudolph Maté	Richard Derr, Barbara Rush, Peter Hansen, John Hoyt	United States	Action Thriller
1952
Title	Director	Cast	Country	Subgenre/Notes
Alraune	Arthur Maria Rabenalt	Hildegard Knef, Erich von Stroheim	West Germany	Horror
1. April 2000	Wolfgang Liebeneiner	Hilde Krahl, Joseph Meinrad, Curd Jürgens	Austria	Comedy Fantasy Romance (Note: Original title: 1 April 2000.)
Captive Women	Stuart Gilmore	Robert Clarke, Margaret Field, Gloria Saunders	United States	(Note: 1956 reissue title: 1000 Years from Now)
Invasion USA	Alfred E Green	Gerald Mohr, Peggie Castle, Dan O'Herlihy	United States	Drama War
Monkey Business	Howard Hawks	Cary Grant, Ginger Rogers, Charles Coburn, Marilyn Monroe	United States	Comedy
Mother Riley Meets the Vampire (a.k.a My Son, the Vampire)	John Gilling	Arthur Lucan, Bela Lugosi	UK	Horror Comedy
Radar Men from the Moon	Fred C. Brannon	George D. Wallace, Aline Towne, Roy Barcroft	United States	Action Family Serial film
Red Planet Mars	Harry Horner	Peter Graves, Andrea King, Orley Lindgren	United States	Drama
Untamed Women	Merle W. Connell, James R. Connell	Mikel Conrad, Doris Merrick, Richard Monahan	United States	War
Zombies of the Stratosphere	Fred C. Brannon	Judd Holdren	United States	Action Adventure Serial film
1953
Title	Director	Cast	Country	Subgenre/Notes
The 5,000 Fingers of Dr. T.	Roy Rowland	Peter Lind Hayes, Mary Healy, Hans Conried, Tommy Rettig	United States	Musical Fantasy "The wonder musical of the future."
Abbott and Costello Go to Mars	Charles Lamont	Bud Abbott, Lou Costello, Mari Blanchard	United States	Comedy Family Fantasy
Abbott and Costello Meet Dr. Jekyll and Mr. Hyde	Charles Lamont	Bud Abbott, Lou Costello, Boris Karloff	United States	Comedy Horror Mystery
The Beast from 20,000 Fathoms	Eugène Lourié	Paul Christian, Paula Raymond, Cecil Kellaway	United States	Horror
Cat-Women of the Moon	Arthur D. Hilton	Sonny Tufts, Victor Jory, Marie Windsor, Carol Brewster	United States	Adventure (Note: Alternative title: Rocket to the Moon.)
Commando Cody: Sky Marshal of the Universe	Harry Keller, Franklin Adreon, Fred C. Brannon	Judd Holdren, Aline Towne	United States	Action Adventure Serial film
Donovan's Brain	Felix E. Feist	Lew Ayres, Gene Evans, Nancy Davis	United States	Horror
Flight to the Moon (a.k.a Полёт на Луну)	Brumberg sisters	Vera Bendina (voice), Yevgeniya Mores (voice), Valentina Sperantova (voice)	Soviet Union	Animation Short Adventure Family
Four Sided Triangle	Terence Fisher	Barbara Payton, John Van Eyssen, Percy Marmont	United Kingdom	Romance
Invaders from Mars	William Cameron Menzies	Jimmy Hunt, Arthur Franz, Helena Carter	United States	Horror
It Came from Outer Space	Jack Arnold	Richard Carlson, Barbara Rush, Charles Drake	United States	Horror
The Lost Planet	Spencer Gordon Bennet	Judd Holdren, Vivian Mason, Michael Fox	United States	Family Serial film
The Magnetic Monster	Curt Siodmak	Richard Carlson, King Donovan, Harry Ellerbe	United States	Horror
Mesa of Lost Women	Herbert Tevos, Ron Ormond	Jackie Coogan, Richard Travis, Allan Nixon, Mary Hill	United States	Horror
The Neanderthal Man	Ewald Andre Dupont	Robert Shayne, Doris Merrick, Richard Crane	United States	Horror
Phantom from Space	W. Lee Wilder	Ted Cooper, Rudolph Anders, Noreen Nash	United States	Horror
Port Sinister (a.k.a Beast of Paradise Isle)	Harold Daniels	James Warren, Lynne Roberts, Paul Cavanagh	United States	Adventure Crime (Note: 1957 reissue title: Beast of Paradise Isle.)
Project Moonbase	Richard Talmadge	Donna Martell, Hayden Rorke, Ross Ford	United States	
Robot Monster	Phil Tucker	George Nader, Claudia Barrett, Selena Royle	United States	Comedy Family Horror (Note: U.S. 2-D version title: Monster from Mars.)
Spaceways	Terence Fisher	Howard Duff, Eva Bartok, Alan Wheatley	United Kingdom; United States	Thriller
The Twonky	Arch Oboler	Hans Conried, Billy Lynn, Gloria Blondell, Janet Warren	United States	Comedy
The War of the Worlds	Byron Haskin	Gene Barry, Ann Robinson, Les Tremayne, Lewis Martin	United States	Action Thriller (Note: Winner of an Academy Award for Visual Effects in 1953, and a Retroactive Hugo Award in 2004.)
1954
Title	Director	Cast	Country	Subgenre/Notes
20,000 Leagues Under the Sea	Richard Fleischer	Kirk Douglas, James Mason, Paul Lukas	United States	Adventure Drama Family Fantasy (Note: Winner of Academy Awards for Visual Effects and Best Art Direction in 1954.)
Creature from the Black Lagoon	Jack Arnold	Richard Carlson, Julie Adams, Richard Denning, Antonio Moreno	United States	Horror
Devil Girl from Mars	David MacDonald	Patricia Laffan, Hugh McDermott, Adrienne Corri	United Kingdom	Horror
Godzilla (a.k.a Gojira)	Ishirō Honda	Akira Takarada, Momoko Kōchi, Takashi Shimura	Japan	Horror Kaijū
Gog	Ivan Tors	Richard Egan, Constance Dowling, Herbert Marshall	United States	Drama Horror Romance Thriller
Killers from Space	W. Lee Wilder	Peter Graves, Barbara Bestar, James Seay, Frank Gerstle	United States	Horror Mystery
Monster from the Ocean Floor	Wyott Ordung	Anne Kimball, Stuart Wade, Dick Pinner	United States	Horror
Riders to the Stars	Richard Carlson	William Lundigan, Herbert Marshall	United States	Drama
The Rocket Man	Oscar Rudolph	Charles Coburn, Spring Byington, Anne Francis, John Agar, George Winslow	United States	Comedy Famille
The Snow Creature	W. Lee Wilder	William Phipps	United States	Horror
Stranger from Venus	Burt Balaban	Patricia Neal, Helmut Dantine, Derek Bond	United States	released to US TV as Immediate Disaster
Target Earth	Sherman A. Rose	Richard Denning, Kathleen Crowley, Whit Bissell, Virginia Grey	United States	Horror
Them!	Gordon Douglas	James Whitmore, Edmund Gwenn, Joan Weldon, James Arness	United States	Horror
Tobor the Great	Lee Sholem	Charles Drake, Karin Booth, Billy Chapin	United States	Adventure Family
1955
Title	Director	Cast	Country	Subgenre/Notes
The Beast with a Million Eyes	David Kramarsky	Paul Birch, Lorna Thayer, Dona Cole, Dick Sargent	United States	Horror (Note: Uncredited. There is no hint of other directors on the reel, on air or on AMC TV. Co-directed by Lou Place and Roger Corman.)
Bride of the Monster	Edward D. Wood Jr.	Bela Lugosi, Tor Johnson, Tony McCoy, Loretta King	United States	Horror
Creature with the Atom Brain	Edward L. Cahn	Richard Denning, Angela Greene, S. John Launer	United States	Crime Horror Thriller
Conquest of Space	Byron Haskin	Walter Brooke, Eric Fleming, Mickey Shaughnessy	United States	
The Phantom from 10,000 Leagues	Dan Milner	Kent Taylor, Cathy Downs, Michael Whalen	United States	Horror
Day the World Ended	Roger Corman	Richard Denning, Lori Nelson, Paul Birch, Touch Connors	United States	Horror
Godzilla Raids Again (a.k.a. Gigantis, the Fire Monster)	Motoyoshi Oda	Hiroshi Koizumi, Minoru Chiaki	Japan	Horror Kaijū (released in U.S. in 1959)
It Came from Beneath the Sea	Robert Gordon	Kenneth Tobey, Faith Domergue, Donald Curtis	United States	Horror
Journey to the Beginning of Time	Karel Zeman	Josef Lukáš, Petr Herrmann, Zdeněk Husták, Vladimír Bejval	Czechoslovakia	re-edited US version released in 1966
King Dinosaur	Bert I. Gordon	Josef Lukáš, Petr Herrmann, Zdeněk Husták, Vladimír Bejval	United States	Adventure
Half Human	Ishirō Honda	Akira Takarada, Akemi Negishi	Japan	Horror. Japanese version. See 1958 for USA version
The Quatermass Xperiment	Val Guest	Brian Donlevy, Jack Warner, Richard Wordsworth, Margia Dean	United Kingdom	Horror (Note: U.S. title: The Creeping Unknown.)
Revenge of the Creature	Jack Arnold	John Agar, Lori Nelson, John Bromfield, Nestor Paiva	United States	Horror
Tarantula	Jack Arnold	John Agar, Mara Corday, Leo G. Carroll, Nestor Paiva	United States	Horror
This Island Earth	Jack Arnold, Joseph Newman	Jeff Morrow, Faith Domergue, Rex Reason	United States	Horror Mystery
Timeslip (a.k.a The Atomic Man)	Ken Hughes	Gene Nelson, Faith Domergue	United Kingdom	
1956
Title	Director	Cast	Country	Subgenre/Notes
1984	Michael Anderson	Edmond O'Brien, Jan Sterling, Michael Redgrave, Donald Pleasence	United Kingdom	Drama
The Beast of Hollow Mountain	Edward Nassour, Ismael Rodríguez	Guy Madison, Patricia Medina, Carlos Rivas	United States	Horror Romance Thriller Western
The Black Sleep	Reginald LeBorg	Basil Rathbone, Akim Tamiroff, Herbert Rudley, Patricia Blake, Lon Chaney Jr., John Carradine, Bela Lugosi, Tor Johnson	United States	Horror
The Creature Walks Among Us	John Sherwood	Jeff Morrow, Rex Reason, Leigh Snowden	United States	Horror
Earth vs. the Flying Saucers	Fred Sears	Hugh Marlowe, Joan Taylor, Donald Curtis, Morris Ankrum	United States	Action Horror
Fire Maidens from Outer Space	Cy Roth	Anthony Dexter, Susan Shaw	United Kingdom	(Note: U.S. title: Fire Maidens of Outer Space.)
Forbidden Planet	Fred Wilcox	Walter Pidgeon, Anne Francis, Leslie Nielsen	United States	Adventure
The Gamma People	John Gilling	Paul Douglas, Eva Bartok, Leslie Phillips	United Kingdom	Drama Horror Thriller
Godzilla, King of the Monsters!	Terrell O. Morse, Ishirō Honda	Raymond Burr, Takashi Shimura, Akira Takarada, Kenji Sahara, Momoko Kochi	United States; Japan	Action Horror Kaijū
Indestructible Man	Jack Pollexfen	Lon Chaney Jr., Max Showalter, Marian Carr	United States	Crime Horror
Invasion of the Body Snatchers	Don Siegel	Kevin McCarthy, Dana Wynter, King Donovan	United States	Horror
It Conquered the World	Roger Corman	Peter Graves, Beverly Garland, Lee Van Cleef	United States	Horror
The Mole People	Virgil Vogel	John Agar, Cynthia Patrick, Hugh Beaumont, Nestor Paiva	United States	Adventure Fantasy Horror
Rodan (a.k.a Sora no Daikaijū Radon)	Ishirō Honda	Kenji Sahara. Yumi Shirakawa, Yoshifumi Tajima	Japan	Horror Kaijū (Note: US title: Rodan! the Flying Monster.)
Satellite in the Sky	Paul Dickson	Kieron Moore, Lois Maxwell, Donald Wolfit, Bryan Forbes	United Kingdom	
Supersonic Saucer	Guy Fergusson	Marcia Manolescue, Gillian Harrison, Fella Edmonds	United Kingdom	Adventure Family
UFO (a.k.a Unidentified Flying Objects: The True Story of Flying Saucers)	Winston Jones	Tom Towers	USA	Semi-documentary / Sci fi
The Werewolf	Fred F. Sears	Don Megowan, Joyce Holden, Steven Ritch, Eleanore Tanin	United States	
World Without End	Edward Bernds	Hugh Marlowe, Nancy Gates, Rod Taylor	United States	Adventure Romance
X the Unknown	Leslie Norman	Dean Jagger, Edward Chapman, Leo McKern	United States; United Kingdom	Horror
1957
Title	Director	Cast	Country	Subgenre/Notes
20 Million Miles to Earth	Nathan H. Juran	William Hopper, Joan Taylor, Frank Puglia, John Zaremba	United States	Adventure Family Fantasy Horror Thriller
The 27th Day	William Asher	Gene Barry, Valerie French, George Voskovec	United States	
The Abominable Snowman	Val Guest	Forrest Tucker, Peter Cushing	United Kingdom	Adventure Fantasy Horror
The Astounding She-Monster	Ronnie Ashcroft	Jeanne Tatum, Ewing Brown, Robert Clarke	United States	Crime Horror
The Amazing Colossal Man	Bert I. Gordon	Glenn Langan, Cathy Downs, William Hudson	United States	
Attack of the Crab Monsters	Roger Corman	Richard Garland, Pamela Duncan, Russell Johnson	United States	Horror
Beginning of the End	Bert I. Gordon	Peter Graves, Peggie Castle, Morris Ankrum	United States	Horror
The Black Scorpion	Edward Ludwig	Richard Denning, Mara Corday, Carlos Rivas	United States	Horror
The Brain from Planet Arous	Nathan H. Juran	John Agar, Joyce Meadows, Robert Fuller	United States	Action Adventure Horror Thriller
The Curse of Frankenstein	Terence Fisher	Peter Cushing, Hazel Court, Robert Urquhart, Christopher Lee	United Kingdom	Horror
The Cyclops	Bert I. Gordon	James Craig, Gloria Talbott, Lon Chaney Jr.	United States	Horror
The Deadly Mantis	Nathan H. Juran	Craig Stevens, William Hopper, Alix Talton	United States	Family Horror Thriller
The Giant Claw	Fred Sears	Jeff Morrow, Mara Corday, Morris Ankrum	United States	Fantasy Horror Thriller
Half Human	Ishirō Honda, Kenneth G. Crane	John Carradine, Morris Ankrum	Japan; United States	Horror. USA version. See 1955 for Japan version
The Invisible Man vs The Human Fly	Mitsuo Murayama	Yoshirô Kitahara, Ryûji Shinagawa, Junko Kanô, Ikuko Môri	Japan	Crime Mystery Horror
The Incredible Shrinking Man	Jack Arnold	Grant Williams, Randy Stuart, April Kent	United States	Horror (Note: Winner of a Hugo Award for Best Dramatic Presentation in 1958.)
Invasion of the Saucer Men	Edward L. Cahn	Steve Terrell, Gloria Castillo, Frank Gorshin, Lyn Osborne	United States	Family Horror
The Invisible Boy	Herman Hoffman	Richard Eyer, Philip Abbott, Diane Brewster	United States	Adventure Comedy Family
The Invisible Man vs. The Human Fly	Mitsuo Murayama	Ryuji Shinagawa, Yoshiro Kitahara, Junko Kano	Japan	Only released in Japan
I Was a Teenage Frankenstein	Herbert L. Strock	Whit Bissell, Phyllis Coates, Robert Burton, Gary Conway, George Lynn	USA	Drama Fantasy Horror
I Was a Teenage Werewolf	Gene Fowler Jr.	Michael Landon, Whit Bissell, Yvonne Lime	USA	Horror
Kronos	Kurt Neumann	Jeff Morrow, Barbara Lawrence, John Emery, George O'Hanlon	United States	Action Drama Horror Romance
The Land Unknown	Virgil Vogel	Jock Mahoney, Shawn Smith, William Reynolds	United States	Adventure Fantasy Thriller
The Man Without a Body	Charles Saunders, W. Lee Wilder	Robert Hutton, George Coulouris, Julia Arnall	United Kingdom	Horror
The Man Who Turned to Stone	László Kardos	Victor Jory, William Hudson	United States	Horror
The Monolith Monsters	John Sherwood	Grant Williams, Lola Albright, Les Tremayne	United States	Drama Horror
Monster from Green Hell	Kenneth G. Crane	Jim Davis	United States	Horror
The Monster That Challenged the World	Arnold Laven	Tim Holt, Audrey Dalton, Hans Conried	United States	Horror Thriller
The Mysterians (a.k.a Chikyû Bôeigun)	Ishirō Honda	Kenji Sahara, Yumi Shirakawa, Momoko Kochi	Japan	Action Family Thriller Kaijū
The Night the World Exploded	Fred Sears	Kathryn Grant, William Leslie, Tristram Coffin	United States	
Not of This Earth	Roger Corman	Paul Birch, Beverly Garland, Morgan Jones	United States	Horror
Quatermass 2	Val Guest	Brian Donlevy, John Longden, Sid James	United Kingdom	Horror (Note: U.S. title: Enemy from Space.)
Road To The Stars (a.k.a Doroga K Zvezdam)	Pavel Klushantsev	Georgi Solovyov	Soviet Union	Biography
The Secret of Two Oceans	Konstantin Pipinashvili	Igor Vladimirov, Sergej Golovanov, Sergej Stoljarov	Soviet Union	Adventure Crime Fantasy Mystery
She Devil	Kurt Neumann	Albert Dekker, Jack Kelly, Mari Blanchard	United States	Crime Horror Thriller
The Unearthly	Brooke Peters	John Carradine, Myron Healey, Allison Hayes	United States	Horror
The Unknown Terror	Charles Marquis Warren	John Howard, Mala Powers, Paul E. Richards, May Wynn	United States	Horror
The Vampire	Paul Landres	John Beal, Colleen Gray, Kenneth Tobey	United States	Horror Thriller
The Robot vs. The Aztec Mummy (a.k.a La momia azteca contra el robot humano)	Rafael Portillo	Ramon Gay, Rosita Arenas, Luis Aceves Castaneda	Mexico	Horror
1958
Title	Director	Cast	Country	Subgenre/Notes
Attack of the 50 Foot Woman	Nathan H. Juran	Allison Hayes, William Hudson, Yvette Vickers	United States	Horror
Attack of the Puppet People	Bert I. Gordon	John Agar, Michael Mark, Jack Kosslyn	United States	Horror
Ballad of the Ming Tombs Reservoir (a.k.a Shi san ling shui ku chang xiang qu)	Jin Shan	Jin Shan, Yu Daiqin, Zhang Yisheng	China	
The Blob	Irvin Shortess Yeaworth Jr.	Steve McQueen, Aneta Corsaut, Earl Rowe	United States	Horror
Blood of the Vampire	Henry Cass	Donald Wolfit, Barbara Shelley, Vincent Ball, Victor Maddern	United Kingdom	
The Brain Eaters	Bruno Ve Sota	Ed Nelson, Alan Frost, Jack Hill	United States	Horror
The Colossus of New York	Eugène Lourié	Ross Martin, Mala Powers, Charles Herbert	United States	Horror
Curse Of The Faceless Man	Edward L. Cahn	Richard Anderson, Elaine Edwards, Adele Mara, Luis van Rooten	United States	
The Day the Sky Exploded (a.k.a La morte viene dallo spazio)	Paolo Heusch	Paul Hubschmid, Fiorella Mari, Gérard Landry, Dario Michaelis	France; Italy	(Note: Italian title: La Morte viene dallo Spazio.)
Earth vs. the Spider	Bert I. Gordon	Ed Kemmer, Gene Persson, Gene Roth	United States	Family Horror Thriller
Escapement (a.k.a The Electronic Monster)	Montgomery Tully, David Paltenghi	Rod Cameron, Mary Murphy, Meredith Edwards	United Kingdom; United States	Crime Horror Mystery
Invention for Destruction (a.k.a Vynález zkázy)	Karel Zeman	Lubor Tokoš, Jana Zatloukalová	Czechoslovakia	Animation Adventure Fantasy
Fiend Without a Face	Arthur Crabtree	Kynaston Reeves, Marshall Thompson, Terry Kilburn	United Kingdom; United States	Horror
The Flame Barrier	Paul Landres	Arthur Franz, Kathleen Crowley	United States	Horror
The Fly	Kurt Neumann	Vincent Price, Patricia Owens, Herbert Marshall	United States	Drama Horror
Frankenstein 1970	Howard W. Koch	Boris Karloff, Tom Duggan, Jana Lund	United States	Horror
Frankenstein's Daughter	Richard Cunha	Donald Murphy, John Ashley, Sandra Knight	United States	Horror Romance Thriller
From the Earth to the Moon	Byron Haskin	Joseph Cotten, George Sanders, Debra Paget	United States	Adventure Fantasy
Giant from the Unknown	Richard E. Cunha	Ed Kemmer, Sally Fraser, Buddy Baer	United States	Drama Horror
The H-Man (a.k.a Bijo to ekitai ningen)	Ishirō Honda	Yumi Shirakawa, Kenji Sahara, Akihiko Hirata	Japan	Crime Horror Thriller
The Hideous Sun Demon	Robert Clarke	Robert Clarke, Patricia Manning, Nan Peterson	United States	Horror
How to Make a Monster	Herbert L. Strock	Robert H. Harris, Gary Conway, Gary Clarke, Morris Ankrum	USA	Horror
I Married a Monster from Outer Space	Gene Fowler	Tom Tryon, Gloria Talbott, Ken Lynch	United States	Horror
It! The Terror from Beyond Space	Edward L. Cahn	Marshall Thompson, Shawn Smith, Kim Spalding	United States	Horror Thriller
The Lost Missile	Lester William Berke	Robert Loggia, Ellen Parker, Phillip Pine	United States	
Missile Monsters	Fred C. Brannon	Kent Fowler, Gregory Gaye	United States	Action Adventure Crime Fantasy. Recut of Flying Disc Man from Mars serial
Missile to the Moon	Richard E. Cunha	K. T. Stevens, Richard Travis, Lisa Simone	United States	Drama
Monster on the Campus	Jack Arnold	Arthur Franz, Joanna Cook Moore	United States	Horror
The New Invisible Man (a.k.a El hombre que logró ser invisible)	Alfredo B. Crevenna	Arturo de Córdova, Ana Luisa Peluffo, Raúl Meraz	Mexico	Fantasy Horror
Night of the Blood Beast	Bernard Kowalski	Michael Emmet, Angela Greene, John Baer	United States	Horror
Queen of Outer Space	Edward Bernds	Zsa Zsa Gabor, Laurie Mitchell, Eric Fleming	United States	Adventure Fantasy
The Revenge of Frankenstein	Terence Fisher	Peter Cushing, Francis Matthews, Eunice Gayson, Michael Gwynn	United Kingdom	Horror
Rocket Attack U.S.A. (a.k.a Five Minutes to Zero)	Barry Mahon	Monica Davis, John McKay, Daniel Kern, Edward Czerniuk, Phillip St. George	United States	
Satan's Satellites	Fred C. Brannon	Judd Holdren, Aline Towne, Lane Bradford	United States	Recut of Zombies of the Stratosphere serial
She Demons	Richard E. Cunha	Irish McCalla, Tod Griffin, Victor Sen Yung	United States	Horror
The Space Children	Jack Arnold	Adam Williams, Michel Ray, Johnny Crawford, Sandy Descher	United States	
Space Master X-7	Edward Bernds	Robert Ellis, Bill Williams, Lyn Thomas	United States	Horror Thriller
The Strange World of Planet X (UK) (a.k.a. Cosmic Monsters)	Gilbert Gunn	Forrest Tucker, Gaby Andre, Martin Benson	United Kingdom	Drama Horror (Note: U.S. title: The Cosmic Monster.)
Teenage Cave Man	Roger Corman	Robert Vaughn, Leslie E. Bradley, Frank de Kova	United States	Adventure
Teenage Monster	Jacques R. Marquette	Anne Gwynne, Stuart Wade	United States	Horror Western (Note: Also called Meteor Monster. Premiered in 1957.)
The Trollenberg Terror	Quentin Lawrence	Forrest Tucker, Laurence Payne, Janet Munro	United Kingdom	Horror (Note: U.S. title: The Crawling Eye.)
Varan the Unbelievable (a.k.a Daikaijû Baran)	Ishirō Honda	Tsuruko Kobayashi, Kōzō Nomura, Ayumi Sonoda	Japan	Horror Kaijū (Note: US revision in 1962: Varan the Unbelievable.)
War of the Colossal Beast	Bert I. Gordon	Sally Fraser, Dean Parkin, Roger Pace	United States	Horror
War of the Satellites	Roger Corman	Susan Cabot, Richard Devon, Eric Sinclair	United States	Horror
Terror from the Year 5000 (a.k.a. Cage Of Doom)	Robert J. Gurney Jr.	Ward Costello, Joyce Holden, John Stratton, Salome Jens, Fred Herrick	United States	
1959
Title	Director	Cast	Country	Subgenre/Notes
The 30 Foot Bride of Candy Rock	Sidney Miller	Lou Costello, Dorothy Provine, Gale Gordon	United States	Comedy
4D Man	Irvin Shortess Yeaworth Jr.	Robert Lansing, Lee Meriwether, James Congdon	United States	Action Horror Romance Thriller
The Alligator People	Roy Del Ruth	Beverly Garland, Bruce Bennett, Lon Chaney Jr., George Macready	United States	Horror
The Angry Red Planet	Ib Melchior	Gerald Mohr, Les Tremayne, Nora Hayden	United States	Adventure Horror
The Atomic Submarine	Spencer Gordon Bennet	Arthur Franz, Dick Foran, Brett Halsey	United States	Thriller
Attack of the Giant Leeches	Bernard Kowalski	Jan Shepard, Gene Roth, Yvette Vickers	United States	Horror
Battle Beyond the Sun	Mikhail Kozyry	Aleksandr Shvorin, Ivan Pereverzhev	Soviet Union	Adventure (This re-edited U.S. version of Nebo Zovyot was released in 1962)
Battle in Outer Space (a.k.a Uchû sai sensô)	Ishirō Honda	Ryō Ikebe, Koreya Senda	Japan	Action
Caltiki – The Immortal Monster (a.k.a Caltiki, il mostro immortale)	Riccardo Freda, Mario Bava	John Merivale, Didi Perego, Gérard Herter, Giacomo Rossi-Stuart	Italy	Horror
The Cosmic Man	Herbert Greene	Bruce Bennett, John Carradine, Angela Greene	United States	Adventure Thriller
The Final War (aka Dai-sanji sekai taisen: Yonjû-ichi jikan no kyôfu)	Shigeaki Hidaki	Tatsuo Umemiya, Yoshiko Mita	Japan	Action Adventure War
First Man into Space	Robert Day	Marshall Thompson, Marla Landi, Bill Edwards	United Kingdom	Drama Horror
The Giant Gila Monster	Ray Kellogg	Don Sullivan, Lisa Simone, Fred Graham	United States	Horror Thriller
Have Rocket, Will Travel	David Lowell Rich	Jerome Cowan, Anna-Lisa, Curly Joe DeRita	United States	Comedy Family
The Head (a.k.a Die Nackte und der Satan)	Victor Trivas	Michel Simon, Horst Frank, Christiane Maybach	West Germany	Horror
The Incredible Petrified World	Jerry Warren	John Carradine, Phyllis Coates, Robert Clarke	United States	Action Adventure Thriller
Invasion of the Animal People (a.k.a Terror in the Midnight Sun)	Virgil W. Vogel	Bengt Blomgren, John Carradine	United States; Sweden	Horror
Invisible Invaders	Edward L. Cahn	John Agar, Jean Byron, Philip Tonge, Robert Hutton, John Carradine	United States	Horror
Journey to the Center of the Earth	Henry Levin	Pat Boone, James Mason, Arlene Dahl, Diane Baker	United States	Adventure Family Fantasy Romance
The Killer Shrews	Ray Kellogg	James Best, Ken Curtis, Ingrid Goude	United States	Horror
The Manster	George Breakston, Kenneth G. Crane	Peter Dyneley, Jane Hylton, Satoshi Nakamura, Terri Zimmern	Japan; United States	Horror (released in U.S. in 1962)
The Man Who Could Cheat Death	Terence Fisher	Anton Diffring, Christopher Lee	United Kingdom	Drama Horror (Note: Remake of The Man in Half Moon Street.)
The Monster of Piedras Blancas	Irvin Berwick	Les Tremayne, Forrest Lewis, John Harmon	United States	Horror
Nebo Zovyot (a.k.a Battle Beyond the Sun)	Mikhail Karyukov, Aleksandr Kozyr	Ivan Pereverzev	Soviet Union	Adventure
On the Beach	Stanley Kramer	Gregory Peck, Ava Gardner, Fred Astaire	United States	Drama Romance
Plan 9 from Outer Space	Edward D. Wood Jr.	Bela Lugosi, Mona McKinnon, Gregory Walcott, Vampira	United States	Horror
Return of the Fly	Edward Bernds	Vincent Price, Brett Halsey, John Sutton	United States	Drama Fantasy Horror
Teenagers from Outer Space	Tom Graeff	David Love, Dawn Anderson, Harvey B. Dunn	United States	Horror Thriller
The Tingler	William Castle	Vincent Price, Judith Evelyn, Darryl Hickman	United States	Horror
The Giant Behemoth (a.k.a. Behemoth, the Sea Monster or The Behemoth)	Eugène Lourié, Douglas Hickox	Gene Evans, André Morell	United States	Horror
The Ugly Duckling	Lance Comfort	Bernard Bresslaw, Jon Pertwee, Reginald Beckwith	United Kingdom	Comedy
The Wasp Woman	Roger Corman	Susan Cabot, Anthony Eisley, Barboura Morris, Michael Mark, Bruno Ve Sota	United States	Horror
The World, the Flesh and the Devil	Ranald MacDougall	Harry Belafonte, Inger Stevens, Mel Ferrer	United States	Drama Romance
The Ugly Duckling	Lance Comfort	Bernard Bresslaw, Reginald Beckwith, Jon Pertwee, Maudie Edwards	United Kingdom	Comedy Crime

== See also ==
- History of science fiction films
