= 1958 in science fiction =

The year 1958 was marked, in science fiction, by the following events.

== Births and deaths ==
=== Births ===
- Wayne Barlowe
- Jay Caselberg
- Bradley Denton
- A. R. Morlan (d. 2016)
- Don Sakers (d. 2021)
- David Sherman
- Johanna Sinisalo
- Allen Steele
- Peter Watts
- Lynda Williams

=== Deaths ===
- E. Everett Evans (b. 1893)
- Cyril M. Kornbluth (b. 1923)
- Henry Kuttner (b. 1915)
- R. DeWitt Miller (b. 1910)

== Literary releases ==
=== First editions ===
- A Case of Conscience by James Blish, a Jesuit priest grapples with the morality of an alien civilization.
- The Cosmic Rape by Theodore Sturgeon, humanity is absorbed into a collective alien consciousness.
- The Languages of Pao by Jack Vance, language manipulation shapes the destiny of an alien world.
- Methuselah's Children by Robert A. Heinlein, a long-lived family flees Earth to escape persecution.
- Non-Stop by Brian W. Aldiss, a generational spaceship's inhabitants discover their true situation.
- Slaves of the Klau by Jack Vance, human captives plan an escape from their alien overlords.
- Star Gate by Andre Norton, a man uses a star gate to travel between parallel worlds.
- Starman's Quest by Robert Silverberg, a spacefaring twin searches for his long-lost brother.
- The Time Traders by Andre Norton, time agents battle an alien menace through history.
- The Tower of Zanid by L. Sprague de Camp, an adventurer navigates political intrigue on an alien planet.

=== Short stories ===
- "The Feeling of Power" by Isaac Asimov, If: Worlds of Science Fiction (February)
- "The Men Who Murdered Mohammed" by Alfred Bester, The Magazine of Fantasy & Science Fiction (October)
- "Or All the Seas with Oysters" by Avram Davidson, Galaxy Science Fiction (May)
- "The Prize of Peril" by Robert Sheckley, The Magazine of Fantasy & Science Fiction (May)

=== Juveniles ===
- Have Space Suit—Will Travel by Robert A. Heinlein (juvenile), a teenager's adventure across the galaxy after winning a space suit.

=== Children's books ===
- Mr. Bass's Planetoid by Eleanor Cameron (children's book), children help save a small planet in the Mushroom Planet series.

== Movies ==
Title	Director	Cast	Country	Subgenre/Notes
Attack of the 50 Foot Woman	Nathan H. Juran	Allison Hayes, William Hudson, Yvette Vickers	United States	Horror
Attack of the Puppet People	Bert I. Gordon	John Agar, Michael Mark, Jack Kosslyn	United States	Horror
Ballad of the Ming Tombs Reservoir (a.k.a. Shi san ling shui ku chang xiang qu)	Jin Shan	Jin Shan, Yu Daiqin, Zhang Yisheng	China	
The Blob	Irvin Shortess Yeaworth Jr.	Steve McQueen, Aneta Corsaut, Earl Rowe	United States	Horror
Blood of the Vampire	Henry Cass	Donald Wolfit, Barbara Shelley, Vincent Ball, Victor Maddern	United Kingdom	
The Brain Eaters	Bruno Ve Sota	Ed Nelson, Alan Frost, Jack Hill	United States	Horror
The Colossus of New York	Eugène Lourié	Ross Martin, Mala Powers, Charles Herbert	United States	Horror
Curse Of The Faceless Man	Edward L. Cahn	Richard Anderson, Elaine Edwards, Adele Mara, Luis van Rooten	United States	
The Day the Sky Exploded (a.k.a. La morte viene dallo spazio)	Paolo Heusch	Paul Hubschmid, Fiorella Mari, Gérard Landry, Dario Michaelis	France; Italy	(Note: Italian title: La Morte viene dallo Spazio.)
Earth vs. the Spider	Bert I. Gordon	Ed Kemmer, Gene Persson, Gene Roth	United States	Family Horror Thriller
Escapement (a.k.a. The Electronic Monster)	Montgomery Tully, David Paltenghi	Rod Cameron, Mary Murphy, Meredith Edwards	United Kingdom; United States	Crime Horror Mystery
Invention for Destruction (a.k.a. Vynález zkázy)	Karel Zeman	Lubor Tokoš, Jana Zatloukalová	Czechoslovakia	Animation Adventure Fantasy
Fiend Without a Face	Arthur Crabtree	Kynaston Reeves, Marshall Thompson, Terry Kilburn	United Kingdom; United States	Horror
The Flame Barrier	Paul Landres	Arthur Franz, Kathleen Crowley	United States	Horror
The Fly	Kurt Neumann	Vincent Price, Patricia Owens, Herbert Marshall	United States	Drama Horror
Frankenstein 1970	Howard W. Koch	Boris Karloff, Tom Duggan, Jana Lund	United States	Horror
Frankenstein's Daughter	Richard Cunha	Donald Murphy, John Ashley, Sandra Knight	United States	Horror Romance Thriller
From the Earth to the Moon	Byron Haskin	Joseph Cotten, George Sanders, Debra Paget	United States	Adventure Fantasy
Giant from the Unknown	Richard E. Cunha	Ed Kemmer, Sally Fraser, Buddy Baer	United States	Drama Horror
The H-Man (a.k.a. Bijo to ekitai ningen)	Ishirō Honda	Yumi Shirakawa, Kenji Sahara, Akihiko Hirata	Japan	Crime Horror Thriller
The Hideous Sun Demon	Robert Clarke	Robert Clarke, Patricia Manning, Nan Peterson	United States	Horror
How to Make a Monster	Herbert L. Strock	Robert H. Harris, Gary Conway, Gary Clarke, Morris Ankrum	USA	Horror
I Married a Monster from Outer Space	Gene Fowler	Tom Tryon, Gloria Talbott, Ken Lynch	United States	Horror
It! The Terror from Beyond Space	Edward L. Cahn	Marshall Thompson, Shawn Smith, Kim Spalding	United States	Horror Thriller
The Lost Missile	Lester William Berke	Robert Loggia, Ellen Parker, Phillip Pine	United States	
Missile Monsters	Fred C. Brannon	Kent Fowler, Gregory Gaye	United States	Action Adventure Crime Fantasy. Recut of Flying Disc Man from Mars serial
Missile to the Moon	Richard E. Cunha	K. T. Stevens, Richard Travis, Lisa Simone	United States	Drama
Monster on the Campus	Jack Arnold	Arthur Franz, Joanna Cook Moore	United States	Horror
The New Invisible Man (a.k.a. El hombre que logró ser invisible)	Alfredo B. Crevenna	Arturo de Córdova, Ana Luisa Peluffo, Raúl Meraz	Mexico	Fantasy Horror
Night of the Blood Beast	Bernard Kowalski	Michael Emmet, Angela Greene, John Baer	United States	Horror
Queen of Outer Space	Edward Bernds	Zsa Zsa Gabor, Laurie Mitchell, Eric Fleming	United States	Adventure Fantasy
Rocket Attack U.S.A. a.k.a. Five Minutes to Zero	Barry Mahon	Monica Davis, John McKay, Daniel Kern, Edward Czerniuk, Phillip St. George	United States	
Satan's Satellites	Fred C. Brannon	Judd Holdren, Aline Towne, Lane Bradford	United States	Recut of Zombies of the Stratosphere serial
She Demons	Richard E. Cunha	Irish McCalla, Tod Griffin, Victor Sen Yung	United States	Horror
The Space Children	Jack Arnold	Adam Williams, Michel Ray, Johnny Crawford, Sandy Descher	United States	
Space Master X-7	Edward Bernds	Robert Ellis, Bill Williams, Lyn Thomas	United States	Horror Thriller
The Strange World of Planet X (UK) (a.k.a. Cosmic Monsters)	Gilbert Gunn	Forrest Tucker, Gaby Andre, Martin Benson	United Kingdom	Drama Horror (Note: U.S. title: The Cosmic Monster.)
Teenage Cave Man	Roger Corman	Robert Vaughn, Leslie E. Bradley, Frank de Kova	United States	Adventure
Teenage Monster	Jacques R. Marquette	Anne Gwynne, Stuart Wade	United States	Horror Western (Note: Also called Meteor Monster. Premiered in 1957.)
Terror from the Year 5000 (a.k.a. Cage Of Doom)	Robert J. Gurney Jr.	Ward Costello, Joyce Holden, John Stratton, Salome Jens, Fred Herrick	United States	
The Trollenberg Terror	Quentin Lawrence	Forrest Tucker, Laurence Payne, Janet Munro	United Kingdom	Horror (Note: U.S. title: The Crawling Eye.)
Varan the Unbelievable (a.k.a. Daikaijû Baran)	Ishirō Honda	Tsuruko Kobayashi, Kōzō Nomura, Ayumi Sonoda	Japan	Horror Kaijū (Note: US revision in 1962: Varan the Unbelievable.)
War of the Colossal Beast	Bert I. Gordon	Sally Fraser, Dean Parkin, Roger Pace	United States	Horror
War of the Satellites	Roger Corman	Susan Cabot, Richard Devon, Eric Sinclair	United States	Horror

== Awards ==
- The Big Time by Fritz Leiber won the Hugo Award for Best Novel.

== See also ==
- 1958 in science
