= List of American films of 1958 =

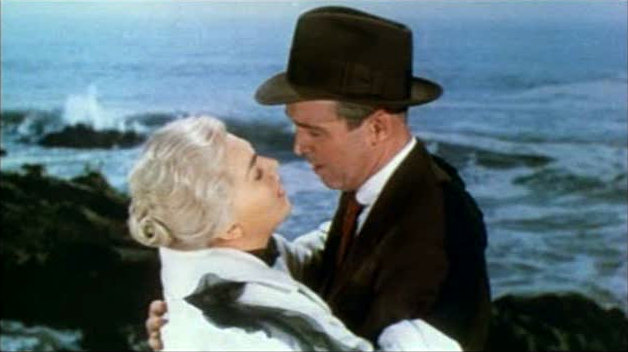
Vertigo

More than 240 American feature films were released in 1958. The musical romantic comedy film Gigi won Best Picture at the Academy Awards.

== A-B ==
Title	Director	Cast	Genre	Notes
Ambush at Cimarron Pass	Jodie Copelan	Scott Brady, Margia Dean, Clint Eastwood	Western	20th Century Fox
Andy Hardy Comes Home	Howard W. Koch	Mickey Rooney, Patricia Breslin, Fay Holden	Comedy	MGM
Anna Lucasta	Arnold Laven	Eartha Kitt, Sammy Davis Jr., Frederick O'Neal	Film noir	United Artists; Remake of 1949 film
Apache Territory	Ray Nazarro	Rory Calhoun, Barbara Bates, John Dehner	Western	Columbia
As Young as We Are	Bernard Girard	Robert Harland, Pippa Scott, Majel Barrett	Drama	Paramount
Attack of the 50 Foot Woman	Nathan H. Juran	Allison Hayes, Yvette Vickers, William Hudson	Science fiction	Allied Artists
Attack of the Puppet People	Bert I. Gordon	John Agar, June Kenney, John Hoyt	Science fiction	AIP
Auntie Mame	Morton DaCosta	Rosalind Russell, Coral Browne, Forrest Tucker	Comedy	Warner Bros.; 5 Academy Award nominations
The Badlanders	Delmer Daves	Alan Ladd, Ernest Borgnine, Katy Jurado	Western	MGM
Badman's Country	Fred F. Sears	George Montgomery, Buster Crabbe, Karin Booth	Western	Warner Bros.
The Barbarian and the Geisha	John Huston	John Wayne, Eiko Ando, Sam Jaffe	Adventure	20th Century Fox
Bell, Book and Candle	Richard Quine	James Stewart, Kim Novak, Jack Lemmon	Comedy	Columbia
The Big Beat	Will Cowan	William Reynolds, Andra Martin, Gogi Grant	Musical	Universal
The Big Country	William Wyler	Gregory Peck, Charlton Heston, Jean Simmons	Western	United Artists; Oscar for Ives
The Blob	Irvin Yeaworth	Steve McQueen, Aneta Corsaut, Stephen Chase	Horror	Paramount; remade in 1988
Blood Arrow	Charles Marquis Warren	Phyllis Coates, Scott Brady, Paul Richards	Western	20th Century Fox
Bonjour Tristesse	Otto Preminger	Deborah Kerr, David Niven, Jean Seberg	Drama	Columbia
Born Reckless	Howard W. Koch	Mamie van Doren, Carol Ohmart, Jeff Richards	Western	Warner Bros.
The Brain Eaters	Bruno VeSota	Ed Nelson, Joanna Lee, Leonard Nimoy	Science fiction	AIP
The Bravados	Henry King	Gregory Peck, Stephen Boyd, Joan Collins	Western	20th Century Fox
The Brothers Karamazov	Richard Brooks	Yul Brynner, Maria Schell, Claire Bloom	Drama	MGM
The Buccaneer	Anthony Quinn	Yul Brynner, Claire Bloom, Charles Boyer	Adventure	Paramount
Buchanan Rides Alone	Budd Boetticher	Randolph Scott, Craig Stevens, Jennifer Holden	Western	Columbia
Bullwhip	Harmon Jones	Guy Madison, Rhonda Fleming, James Griffith	Western	Allied Artists

== C-F ==
Title	Director	Cast	Genre	Notes
The Case Against Brooklyn	Paul Wendkos	Darren McGavin, Margaret Hayes, Warren Stevens	Drama	Columbia
Cat on a Hot Tin Roof	Richard Brooks	Elizabeth Taylor, Paul Newman, Burl Ives	Drama	MGM; based on Tennessee Williams play; 6 Academy Award nominations
Cattle Empire	Charles Marquis Warren	Joel McCrea, Phyllis Coates, Gloria Talbott	Western	20th Century Fox
A Certain Smile	Jean Negulesco	Rossano Brazzi, Joan Fontaine, Bradford Dillman	Drama	20th Century Fox; based on book by Françoise Sagan
China Doll	Frank Borzage	Victor Mature, Li Li-hua, Ward Bond	War romance	United Artists
Cole Younger, Gunfighter	R. G. Springsteen	Frank Lovejoy, James Best, Abby Dalton	Western	Allied Artists
The Colossus of New York	Eugène Lourié	Ross Martin, Hardy Krüger, Mala Powers	Horror science fiction	Paramount
The Cool and the Crazy	William Witney	Scott Marlowe, Gigi Perreau, Richard Bakalyan	Drama	AIP
Cop Hater	William Berke	Robert Loggia, Gerald O'Loughlin, Shirley Ballard	Crime	United Artists
Corridors of Blood	Robert Day	Boris Karloff, Betta St. John, Christopher Lee	Horror	MGM. Co-production with the UK.
Country Music Holiday	Alvin Ganzer	Ferlin Husky, Zsa Zsa Gabor, Rocky Graziano	Musical	Paramount
Cowboy	Delmer Daves	Glenn Ford, Jack Lemmon, Anna Kashfi	Western	Columbia
Crash Landing	Fred F. Sears	Gary Merrill, Nancy Davis, Irene Hervey	Drama	Columbia; final film of Nancy Reagan
The Cry Baby Killer	Joe Addis	Harry Lauter, Jack Nicholson, Carolyn Mitchell	Crime	Allied Artists
Cry Terror!	Andrew L. Stone	James Mason, Inger Stevens, Rod Steiger	Thriller	MGM
Curse of the Faceless Man	Edward L. Cahn	Richard Anderson, Adele Mara, Luis van Rooten	Horror	United Artists
Daddy-O	Lou Place	Dick Contino, Sandra Giles, Bruno VeSota	Comedy	AIP
Damn Citizen	Robert Gordon	Keith Andes, Margaret Hayes, Lynn Bari	Film noir	Universal
Damn Yankees	Stanley Donen, George Abbott	Tab Hunter, Gwen Verdon, Ray Walston	Musical	Warner Bros.; based on the stage musical
Darby's Rangers	William Wellman	James Garner, Jack Warden, Stuart Whitman	War	Warner Bros.
Day of the Badman	Harry Keller	Fred MacMurray, Joan Weldon, John Ericson	Western	Universal
The Decks Ran Red	Andrew L. Stone	James Mason, Dorothy Dandridge, Broderick Crawford	Drama	MGM
The Deep Six	Rudolph Maté	Alan Ladd, Dianne Foster, William Bendix	War drama	Warner Bros.
The Defiant Ones	Stanley Kramer	Tony Curtis, Sidney Poitier, Theodore Bikel	Drama	UA; 6 Oscar nominations
Desert Hell	Charles Marquis Warren	Brian Keith, Barbara Hale, Richard Denning	Adventure	20th Century Fox
Desire Under the Elms	Delbert Mann	Sophia Loren, Anthony Perkins, Burl Ives	Drama	Paramount; based on Eugene O'Neill play
Diamond Safari	Gerald Mayer	Kevin McCarthy, André Morell, Hanna Landy	Adventure	20th Century Fox
Dragstrip Riot	David Bradley	Yvonne Lime, Fay Wray, Connie Stevens	Drama	AIP
Earth vs. the Spider	Bert I. Gordon	Ed Kemmer, June Kenney, Eugene Persson	Science fiction	AIP
Edge of Fury	Irving Lerner	Michael Higgins, Jean Allison, Malcolm Lee Beggs	Drama	United Artists
Enchanted Island	Allan Dwan	Jane Powell, Dana Andrews, Arthur Shields	Adventure	RKO
The Fearmakers	Jacques Tourneur	Dana Andrews, Dick Foran, Mel Tormé	Film noir	United Artists
The Female Animal	Harry Keller	Hedy Lamarr, Jane Powell, Jan Sterling	Drama	Universal
The Fiend Who Walked the West	Gordon Douglas	Robert Evans, Hugh O'Brian, Dolores Michaels	Western	20th Century Fox
The Flame Barrier	Paul Landres	Arthur Franz, Kathleen Crowley, Robert Brown	Science fiction	United Artists
Flaming Frontier	Sam Newfield	Bruce Bennett, Jim Davis, Cecil Linder	Western	20th Century Fox
Flood Tide	Abner Biberman	George Nader, Cornell Borchers, Joanna Moore	Drama	Universal
The Fly	Kurt Neumann	Vincent Price, Patricia Owens, Herbert Marshall	Science fiction	20th Century Fox; remade in 1986
Fort Bowie	Howard W. Koch	Ben Johnson, Maureen Hingert, Kent Taylor	Western	United Artists
Fort Dobbs	Gordon Douglas	Clint Walker, Virginia Mayo, Brian Keith	Western	Warner Bros.
Fort Massacre	Joseph M. Newman	Joel McCrea, Forrest Tucker, Susan Cabot	Western	United Artists
Fortune Is a Woman	Sidney Gilliat	Jack Hawkins, Arlene Dahl, Dennis Price	Film noir	Columbia. Co-production with the UK.
Frankenstein 1970	Howard W. Koch	Boris Karloff, Jana Lund, Don "Red" Barry	Horror	Allied Artists
Frankenstein's Daughter	Richard Cunha	John Ashley, Sandra Knight, Sally Todd	Horror	Astor
Fraulein	Henry Koster	Dana Wynter, Mel Ferrer, Dolores Michaels	Drama	20th Century Fox
From the Earth to the Moon	Byron Haskin	Joseph Cotten, George Sanders, Debra Paget	Science fiction	Warner Bros.
From Hell to Texas	Henry Hathaway	Don Murray, Diane Varsi, Dennis Hopper	Western	20th Century Fox
Frontier Gun	Paul Landres	John Agar, Lyn Thomas, Joyce Meadows	Western	20th Century Fox

== G-K ==
Title	Director	Cast	Genre	Notes
Gang War	Gene Fowler Jr.	Charles Bronson, Jennifer Holden, Kent Taylor	Crime drama	20th Century Fox
The Geisha Boy	Frank Tashlin	Jerry Lewis, Sessue Hayakawa, Suzanne Pleshette	Comedy	Paramount
Ghost of the China Sea	Fred F. Sears	David Brian, Jonathan Haze, Mel Prestidge	War	Columbia
The Gift of Love	Jean Negulesco	Lauren Bacall, Robert Stack, Lorne Greene	Drama	20th Century Fox
Gigi	Vincente Minnelli	Leslie Caron, Louis Jourdan, Maurice Chevalier	Musical	MGM; won 9 Academy Awards
Girl in the Woods	Tom Gries	Margaret Hayes, Forrest Tucker, Barton MacLane	Drama	Republic
The Girl Most Likely	Mitchell Leisen	Jane Powell, Cliff Robertson, Kaye Ballard	Comedy	RKO
Girl on the Run	Richard L. Bare	Efrem Zimbalist Jr., Erin O'Brien, Shepperd Strudwick	Drama	Warner Bros.; TV series pilot
Girls on the Loose	Paul Henreid	Mara Corday, Lita Milan, Barbara Bostock	Film noir	Universal
God's Little Acre	Anthony Mann	Robert Ryan, Aldo Ray, Tina Louise	Drama	United Artists
The Goddess	John Cromwell	Kim Stanley, Lloyd Bridges, Steven Hill	Drama	Columbia
Going Steady	Fred F. Sears	Molly Bee, Alan Reed Jr., Irene Hervey	Comedy	Columbia
Gun Fever	Mark Stevens	Mark Stevens, Maureen Hingert, John Lupton	Western	United Artists
The Gun Runners	Don Siegel	Audie Murphy, Eddie Albert, Patricia Owens	Film noir	United Artists
Gunman's Walk	Phil Karlson	Van Heflin, Tab Hunter, Kathryn Grant	Western	Columbia
Gunsmoke in Tucson	Thomas Carr	Mark Stevens, Forrest Tucker, Gale Robbins	Western	Allied Artists
Handle with Care	David Friedkin	Dean Jones, Joan O'Brien, Thomas Mitchell	Drama	MGM
Harry Black	Hugo Fregonese	Stewart Granger, Barbara Rush, Anthony Steel	Adventure	20th Century Fox. Co-production with the UK.
Hell's Five Hours	Jack L. Copeland	Stephen McNally, Coleen Gray, Vic Morrow	Thriller	Allied Artists
The High Cost of Loving	José Ferrer	José Ferrer, Gena Rowlands, Joanne Gilbert	Comedy drama	MGM
High School Confidential	Jack Arnold	Mamie Van Doren, Russ Tamblyn, Diane Jergens	Crime drama	MGM
Home Before Dark	Mervyn LeRoy	Jean Simmons, Rhonda Fleming, Dan O'Herlihy	Drama	Warner Bros.
Hong Kong Affair	Paul F. Heard	Jack Kelly, May Wynn, Richard Loo	Crime	Allied Artists
Hong Kong Confidential	Edward L. Cahn	Gene Barry, Beverly Tyler, Allison Hayes	Thriller	United Artists
The Hot Angel	Joe Parker	Jackie Loughery, Ed Kemmer, Lyle Talbot	Drama	Paramount
Hot Car Girl	Bernard L. Kowalski	June Kenney, Richard Bakalyan, Robert Knapp	Crime	Allied Artists
Hot Rod Gang	Lew Landers	John Ashley, Gene Vincent, Maureen Arthur	Drama	AIP
Hot Spell	Daniel Mann	Anthony Quinn, Shirley Booth, Shirley MacLaine	Drama	Paramount
Houseboat	Melville Shavelson	Cary Grant, Sophia Loren, Harry Guardino	Comedy	Paramount
How to Make a Monster	Herbert L. Strock	Robert H. Harris, Gary Conway, Gary Clarke	Horror	AIP
The Hunters	Dick Powell	Robert Mitchum, Robert Wagner, Richard Egan	War	20th Century Fox
I Accuse!	José Ferrer	José Ferrer, Viveca Lindfors, Anton Walbrook	Drama	MGM. Co-production with the UK
I Bury the Living	Albert Band	Richard Boone, Theodore Bikel, Herbert Anderson	Horror	United Artists
I Married a Monster from Outer Space	Gene Fowler Jr.	Tom Tryon, Gloria Talbott, Peter Baldwin	Science fiction	Paramount
I Married a Woman	Hal Kanter	George Gobel, Diana Dors, Adolphe Menjou	Comedy	RKO, Universal
I, Mobster	Roger Corman	Steve Cochran, Lita Milan, Celia Lovsky	Crime	20th Century Fox
I Want to Live!	Robert Wise	Susan Hayward, Simon Oakland, Theodore Bikel	Biography	United Artists; Oscar for Hayward
Imitation General	George Marshall	Glenn Ford, Red Buttons, Taina Elg	War comedy	MGM
In Love and War	Philip Dunne	Robert Wagner, Dana Wynter, Sheree North	War	20th Century Fox
In the Money	William Beaudine	Huntz Hall, Stanley Clements, Patricia Donahue	Comedy	Allied Artists; final Bowery Boys film
The Inn of the Sixth Happiness	Mark Robson	Ingrid Bergman, Curt Jurgens, Robert Donat	Biography	20th Century Fox. Co-production with the UK.
Invisible Avenger	James Wong Howe	Richard Derr, Helen Westcott, Jack Donner	Crime	Republic
Island Women	William Berke	Marie Windsor, Vince Edwards, Marilee Earle	Drama	United Artists
It! The Terror from Beyond Space	Edward L. Cahn	Marshall Thompson, Shirley Patterson, Kim Spalding	Science fiction	United Artists
Jet Attack	Edward L. Cahn	John Agar, Audrey Totter, Gregory Walcott	War	AIP
Johnny Rocco	Paul Landres	Stephen McNally, Coleen Gray, Richard Eyer	Crime	Allied Artists
Joy Ride	Edward Bernds	Regis Toomey, Ann Doran, Nicholas King	Crime	Allied Artists
Juvenile Jungle	William Witney	Rebecca Welles, Corey Allen, Anne Whitfield	Drama	Republic
Kathy O'	Jack Sher	Dan Duryea, Jan Sterling, Patty McCormack	Comedy	Universal
The Key	Carol Reed	Sophia Loren, William Holden, Trevor Howard	War	Columbia. Co-production with the UK.
King Creole	Michael Curtiz	Elvis Presley, Carolyn Jones, Dolores Hart	Musical	Paramount
Kings Go Forth	Delmer Daves	Frank Sinatra, Tony Curtis, Natalie Wood	War	United Artists

== L-R ==
Title	Director	Cast	Genre	Notes
The Lady Takes a Flyer	Jack Arnold	Lana Turner, Jeff Chandler, Richard Denning	Romance	Universal
Lafayette Escadrille	William A. Wellman	Tab Hunter, David Janssen, Will Hutchins	War	Warner Bros.
The Last Hurrah	John Ford	Spencer Tracy, Jeffrey Hunter, Dianne Foster	Drama	Columbia
The Last of the Fast Guns	George Sherman	Jock Mahoney, Gilbert Roland, Linda Cristal	Western	Universal
The Law and Jake Wade	John Sturges	Robert Taylor, Richard Widmark, Patricia Owens	Western	MGM
The Left Handed Gun	Arthur Penn	Paul Newman, Lita Milan, John Dehner	Western	Warner Bros.; story of Billy the Kid
Let's Rock	Harry Foster	Julius LaRosa, Phyllis Newman, Conrad Janis	Musical	Columbia
Life Begins at 17	Arthur Dreifuss	Dorothy Johnson, Mark Damon, Luana Anders	Drama	Columbia
The Light in the Forest	Herschel Daugherty	Fess Parker, Wendell Corey, Joanne Dru	Adventure	Disney
The Lineup	Don Siegel	Eli Wallach, Robert Keith, Richard Jaeckel	Film noir	Columbia
Live Fast, Die Young	Paul Henreid	Mary Murphy, Norma Eberhardt, Mike Connors	Film noir	Universal
The Lone Ranger and the Lost City of Gold	Lesley Selander	Clayton Moore, Jay Silverheels, Noreen Nash	Western	United Artists
Lonelyhearts	Vincent J. Donehue	Montgomery Clift, Myrna Loy, Robert Ryan	Film noir	United Artists; based on Nathanael West novel
The Long, Hot Summer	Martin Ritt	Paul Newman, Orson Welles, Joanne Woodward	Drama	20th Century Fox; based on story by William Faulkner
Lost Lagoon	John Rawlins	Jeffrey Lynn, Peter Donat, Roger Clark	Drama	United Artists
Lost, Lonely and Vicious	Frank Myers	Lilyan Chauvin, Carol Nugent, Sandra Giles	Drama	Howco
The Lost Missile	William Berke	Robert Loggia, Phillip Pine, Kitty Kelly	Science fiction	United Artists
Macabre	William Castle	William Prince, Christine Whitem Jacqueline Scott	Horror	Allied Artists
Machete	Kurt Neumann	Mari Blanchard, Albert Dekker, Lee Van Cleef	Drama	United Artists
Machine-Gun Kelly	Roger Corman	Charles Bronson, Susan Cabot, Morey Amsterdam	Crime	AIP
Man from God's Country	Paul Landres	George Montgomery, Randy Stuart, Susan Cummings	Western	Allied Artists
Man in the Shadow	Jack Arnold	Jeff Chandler, Orson Welles, Colleen Miller	Western	Universal
Man of the West	Anthony Mann	Gary Cooper, Lee J. Cobb, Julie London	Western	United Artists
Man or Gun	Albert C. Gannaway	Macdonald Carey, Audrey Totter, James Craig	Western	Republic
The Man Who Died Twice	Joseph Kane	Rod Cameron, Vera Ralston, Mike Mazurki	Crime	Republic
Maracaibo	Cornel Wilde	Cornel Wilde, Jean Wallace, Abbe Lane	Drama	Paramount
Mardi Gras	Edmund Goulding	Pat Boone, Christine Carère, Sheree North	Musical	20th Century Fox
Marjorie Morningstar	Irving Rapper	Natalie Wood, Gene Kelly, Claire Trevor	Drama	Warner Bros.; based on a novel by Herman Wouk
The Matchmaker	Joseph Anthony	Shirley Booth, Shirley MacLaine, Anthony Perkins	Comedy	Paramount; based on Thornton Wilder play
Me and the Colonel	Peter Glenville	Danny Kaye, Nicole Maurey, Curd Jürgens	Comedy	Columbia; Golden Globe for Kaye
Merry Andrew	Michael Kidd	Danny Kaye, Pier Angeli, Patricia Cutts	Musical	MGM
Missile to the Moon	Richard E. Cunha	Richard Travis, Cathy Downs, Tommy Cook	Science fiction	Astor
The Missouri Traveler	Jerry Hopper	Brandon deWilde, Lee Marvin, Gary Merrill	Drama	Disney
Money, Women and Guns	Richard Bartlett	Jock Mahoney, Kim Hunter, Tim Hovey	Western	Universal
Monster on the Campus	Jack Arnold	Arthur Franz, Joanna Moore, Nancy Walters	Science fiction	Universal
The Mugger	William Berke	Kent Smith, Nan Martin, James Franciscus	Drama	United Artists
Murder by Contract	Irving Lerner	Vince Edwards, Phillip Pine, Herschel Bernardi	Film noir	Columbia
The Naked and the Dead	Raoul Walsh	Cliff Robertson, Raymond Massey Aldo Ray	War	RKO; from novel by Norman Mailer
The Naked Maja	Henry Koster	Ava Gardner, Anthony Franciosa, Amedeo Nazzari	Adventure	United Artists. Co-production with Italy.
A Nice Little Bank That Should Be Robbed	Henry Levin	Tom Ewell, Mickey Rooney, Dina Merrill	Comedy	20th Century Fox
No Place to Land	Albert C. Gannaway	John Ireland, Mari Blanchard, Gail Russell	Drama	Republic
No Time for Sergeants	Mervyn LeRoy	Andy Griffith, Nick Adams, Myron McCormick	Comedy	Warner Bros.; based on Broadway play, novel by Mac Hyman
The Notorious Mr. Monks	Joseph Kane	Vera Ralston, Don O'Kelly, Luana Anders	Drama	Republic
The Old Man and the Sea	John Sturges	Spencer Tracy, Harry Bellaver, Don Diamond	Adventure	Warner Bros.; from Ernest Hemingway novel
Once Upon a Horse...	Hal Kanter	Dan Rowan, Dick Martin, Martha Hyer	Western	Universal
Onionhead	Norman Taurog	Andy Griffith, Walter Matthau, Joey Bishop	Comedy	Warner Bros.
Outcasts of the City	Boris Petroff	Osa Massen, Robert Hutton, Maria Palmer	Drama	Republic
Paris Holiday	Gerd Oswald	Bob Hope, Fernandel, Anita Ekberg	Comedy	United Artists
The Party Crashers	Bernard Girard	Frances Farmer, Doris Dowling, Connie Stevens	Drama	Paramount
Party Girl	Nicholas Ray	Cyd Charisse, Robert Taylor, Lee J. Cobb	Film noir	MGM
The Perfect Furlough	Blake Edwards	Tony Curtis, Janet Leigh, Linda Cristal	Comedy	Universal
The Proud Rebel	Michael Curtiz	Alan Ladd, Olivia de Havilland, Dean Jagger	Western	Disney
Quantrill's Raiders	Edward Bernds	Steve Cochran, Diane Brewster, Gale Robbins	Western	Allied Artists
Queen of Outer Space	Edward Bernds	Zsa Zsa Gabor, Eric Fleming, Laurie Mitchell	Science fiction	Allied Artists
The Quiet American	Joseph L. Mankiewicz	Audie Murphy, Michael Redgrave, Giorgia Moll	War drama	United Artists; based on the novel
Rally Round the Flag, Boys!	Leo McCarey	Paul Newman, Joanne Woodward, Joan Collins	Comedy	20th Century Fox
Raw Wind in Eden	Richard Wilson	Esther Williams, Jeff Chandler, Rossana Podestà	Film noir	Universal
The Reluctant Debutante	Vincente Minnelli	Rex Harrison, Kay Kendall, Sandra Dee	Comedy	MGM
The Restless Years	Helmut Käutner	John Saxon, Sandra Dee, Teresa Wright	Film noir	Universal
The Return of Dracula	Paul Landres	Francis Lederer, Norma Eberhardt, Virginia Vincent	Horror	United Artists
Return to Warbow	Ray Nazarro	Philip Carey, Catherine McLeod, Andrew Duggan	Western	Columbia
Revolt in the Big House	R. G. Springsteen	Gene Evans, Robert Blake, Timothy Carey	Crime	Allied Artists
Ride a Crooked Trail	Jesse Hibbs	Audie Murphy, Gia Scala, Walter Matthau	Western	Universal
Rock-A-Bye Baby	Frank Tashlin	Jerry Lewis, Marilyn Maxwell, Connie Stevens	Comedy	Paramount
The Roots of Heaven	John Huston	Errol Flynn, Trevor Howard, Juliette Gréco	Adventure	20th Century Fox
Run Silent, Run Deep	Robert Wise	Clark Gable, Burt Lancaster, Jack Warden	War	United Artists
Rx Murder	Derek Twist	Rick Jason, Lisa Gastoni, Marius Goring	Crime	20th Century Fox. Co-production with the UK.

== S-Z ==
Title	Director	Cast	Genre	Notes
Saddle the Wind	Robert Parrish	Robert Taylor, John Cassavetes, Julie London	Western	MGM; Rod Serling script
The Saga of Hemp Brown	Richard Carlson	Rory Calhoun, Beverly Garland, John Larch	Western	Universal
Screaming Mimi	Gerd Oswald	Anita Ekberg, Philip Carey, Gypsy Rose Lee	Film noir	Columbia
The Screaming Skull	Alex Nicol	John Hudson, Peggy Webber, Russ Conway	Science fiction	AIP
Senior Prom	David Lowell Rich	Jill Corey, Paul Hampton, Barbara Bostock	Musical	Columbia
Separate Tables	Delbert Mann	David Niven, Deborah Kerr, Burt Lancaster	Drama	United Artists; based on the play; Oscar for Niven
Seven Hills of Rome	Roy Rowland	Mario Lanza, Marisa Allasio, Peggie Castle	Musical	MGM
The Seventh Voyage of Sinbad	Nathan H. Juran	Kerwin Mathews, Kathryn Grant, Torin Thatcher	Adventure	Columbia
She Demons	Richard Cunha	Irish McCalla, Victor Sen Yung, Rudolph Anders	Science fiction	Astor
She Gods of Shark Reef	Roger Corman	Lisa Montell, Don Durant, Ed Nelson	Adventure	AIP
The Sheepman	George Marshall	Glenn Ford, Shirley MacLaine, Leslie Nielsen	Western	MGM
Showdown at Boot Hill	Gene Fowler Jr.	Charles Bronson, Carole Mathews, Robert Hutton	Western	20th Century Fox
Sierra Baron	James B. Clark	Brian Keith, Mala Powers, Rita Gam	Western	20th Century Fox
Sing Boy Sing	Henry Ephron	Tommy Sands, Lili Gentle, Edmond O'Brien	Musical	20th Century Fox
Some Came Running	Vincente Minnelli	Frank Sinatra, Dean Martin, Shirley MacLaine	Drama	MGM; novel by James Jones; 5 Oscar nominations
South Pacific	Joshua Logan	Mitzi Gaynor, Rossano Brazzi, John Kerr,	Musical	20th Century Fox; 3 Oscar nominations; based on Broadway show
The Space Children	Jack Arnold	Michel Rey, Adam Williams, Peggy Webber	Science fiction	Paramount
Space Master X-7	Edward Bernds	Bill Williams, Lyn Thomas, Robert Ellis	Horror, science fiction	20th Century Fox
Spy in the Sky!	W. Lee Wilder	Steve Brodie, Andrea Domburg, George Coulouris	Thriller	Allied Artists
St. Louis Blues	Allen Reisner	Nat King Cole, Pearl Bailey, Cab Calloway	Musical	Paramount
Stage Struck	Sidney Lumet	Henry Fonda, Susan Strasberg, Joan Greenwood	Drama	RKO
Stakeout on Dope Street	Irvin Kershner	Abby Dalton, Yale Wexler, Jonathan Haze	Crime	Warner Bros.
Step Down to Terror	Harry Keller	Colleen Miller, Rod Taylor, Charles Drake	Film noir	Universal
Street of Darkness	Robert G. Walker	Robert Keys, Julie Gibson, Sheila Ryan	Adventure	Republic
Suicide Battalion	Edward L. Cahn	Mike Connors, John Ashley, Russ Bender	War	AIP
Summer Love	Charles F. Haas	John Saxon, Molly Bee, Jill St. John	Comedy	Universal
Tarawa Beachhead	Paul Wendkos	Ray Danton, Julie Adams, Kerwin Mathews	War	Columbia
Tarzan's Fight for Life	H. Bruce Humberstone	Gordon Scott, Eve Brent, James Edwards	Adventure	MGM
Teacher's Pet	George Seaton	Clark Gable, Doris Day, Gig Young	Comedy	Paramount
Teenage Cave Man	Roger Corman	Robert Vaughn, Leslie Bradley, Frank de Kova	Science fiction	AIP
Ten Days to Tulara	George Sherman	Sterling Hayden, Rafael Alcayde, Rodolfo Hoyos Jr.	Western	United Artists
Ten North Frederick	Philip Dunne	Gary Cooper, Geraldine Fitzgerald, Suzy Parker	Drama	20th Century Fox; based on John O'Hara novel
Terror from the Year 5000	Robert J. Gurney Jr.	Joyce Holden, Salome Jens, Ward Costello	Science fiction	AIP
Terror in a Texas Town	Joseph H. Lewis	Sterling Hayden, Sebastian Cabot, Nedrick Young	Western	United Artists
The Thing That Couldn't Die	Will Cowan	William Reynolds, Andra Martin, Jeffrey Stone	Science fiction	Universal
Thunder Road	Arthur Ripley	Robert Mitchum, Gene Barry, Keely Smith	Crime	United Artists
Thundering Jets	Helmut Dantine	Audrey Dalton, Rex Reason, Dick Foran	Drama	20th Century Fox
A Time to Love and a Time to Die	Douglas Sirk	John Gavin, Liselotte Pulver, Jock Mahoney	Drama	Universal
Tom Thumb	George Pal	Russ Tamblyn, Alan Young, Terry-Thomas	Musical	MGM. Co-production with the UK
Tonka	Lewis R. Foster	Sal Mineo, Philip Carey, John War Eagle	Western	Disney
Too Much, Too Soon	Art Napoleon	Dorothy Malone, Errol Flynn, Efrem Zimbalist Jr.	Biography	Warner Bros.; biography of Diana Barrymore
Torpedo Run	Joseph Pevney	Glenn Ford, Ernest Borgnine, Diane Brewster	War	MGM
Touch of Evil	Orson Welles	Charlton Heston, Janet Leigh, Orson Welles	Film noir	Universal
Toughest Gun in Tombstone	Earl Bellamy	George Montgomery, Beverly Tyler, Jim Davis	Western	United Artists
The True Story of Lynn Stuart	Lewis Seiler	Betsy Palmer, Jack Lord, Barry Atwater	Biography	Columbia
The Tunnel of Love	Gene Kelly	Doris Day, Richard Widmark, Gig Young	Comedy	MGM
Twilight for the Gods	Joseph Pevney	Rock Hudson, Cyd Charisse, Arthur Kennedy	Adventure	Universal-International
Underwater Warrior	Andrew Marton	Dan Dailey, James Gregory, Claire Kelly	War	MGM
Vertigo	Alfred Hitchcock	James Stewart, Kim Novak, Barbara Bel Geddes	Film noir	Paramount; rated among greatest films
The Vikings	Richard Fleischer	Kirk Douglas, Tony Curtis, Ernest Borgnine	Adventure	United Artists
Villa!!	James B. Clark	Brian Keith, Cesar Romero, Margia Dean	Western	20th Century Fox
Violent Road	Howard W. Koch	Efrem Zimbalist Jr., Brian Keith, Merry Anders	Drama	Warner Bros.
Voice in the Mirror	Harry Keller	Richard Egan, Julie London, Walter Matthau	Film noir	Universal
War of the Colossal Beast	Bert I. Gordon	Sally Fraser, Russ Bender, Rico Alaniz	Science fiction	AIP
War of the Satellites	Roger Corman	Dick Miller, Susan Cabot, Richard Devon	Science fiction	Allied Artists
When Hell Broke Loose	Kenneth G. Crane	Charles Bronson, Richard Jaeckel, Robert Easton	War	Paramount
The Whole Truth	John Guillermin	Stewart Granger, Donna Reed, George Sanders	Crime drama	Columbia. Co-production with the UK.
Wild Heritage	Charles F. Haas	Will Rogers Jr., Maureen O'Sullivan, Judi Meredith	Western	Universal
Wind Across the Everglades	Nicholas Ray	Burl Ives, Christopher Plummer, Gypsy Rose Lee	Drama	Warner Bros.
Wink of an Eye	Winston Jones	Doris Dowling, Barbara Turner, Wally Brown	Comedy	United Artists
Wolf Dog	Sam Newfield	Allison Hayes, Jim Davis, Austin Willis	Drama	20th Century Fox
Wolf Larsen	Harmon Jones	Barry Sullivan, Peter Graves, Gita Hall	Adventure	Allied Artists
The World Was His Jury	Fred F. Sears	Edmond O'Brien, Mona Freeman, Robert McQueeney	Drama	Columbia
Young and Wild	William Witney	Gene Evans, Scott Marlowe, Robert Arthur	Crime	Republic
The Young Lions	Edward Dmytryk	Marlon Brando, Montgomery Clift, Dean Martin	War	20th Century Fox; based on Irwin Shaw novel

== Documentaries ==
Title	Director	Cast	Genre	Notes
White Wilderness	James Algar		Documentary	Disney
Windjammer	Bill Colleran, Louis De Rochemont III		Documentary	Voyage of the Christian Radich

== See also ==
- 1958 in the United States
