= Meredith Merle Nicholson =

American cinematographer (1913–2005)

Meredith Merle Nicholson (March 11, 1913 – August 18, 2005) was an American cinematographer. He worked behind the camera on low-budget films of the 1950s, hit television series in the 1960s, and comedies, dramas, and made-for-TV movies in the 1970s and 1980s.

In 1953, Nicholson, along with his two sons and three other partners, created the company Panavision. While working as an administrator there, he was able to take occasional quick jobs as a cameraman. He was eventually forced out of Panavision in 1960, and devoted the rest of his career to filming.

Nicholson's first job as cinematographer was working for his friend Richard Cunha on Cunha's second film She Demons in 1958. This was followed by work on Cunha's Frankenstein's Daughter (also in 1958), and Missile to the Moon in 1959. Nicholson is credited with achieving amazing results on these films, despite severe budget and time limitations. Each of these films was shot in eight days or fewer. This allowed time for Nicholson to also work on the film The Decks Ran Red at MGM.

After leaving Panavision, Nicholson joined the production crew of the television series My Three Sons. He also was the cinematographer on the television series The Blue Angels and two films by Edgar Ulmer, Beyond the Time Barrier and The Amazing Transparent Man. He later worked on the more obscure films Dangerous Charter, The Devil's Hand, and Escape from Hell Island.

Nicholson's work after these films was exclusively in television. He worked on the series The Fugitive, Twelve O'Clock High, Get Smart, Batman, and The Invaders. In the 1970s he worked on M*A*S*H, Get Christie Love!, Mork & Mindy, and The Odd Couple. Nicholson continued to work in television until the late 1980s. The last television series he worked on was My Sister Sam, which ended in 1988.

Nicholson died on 18 August 2005. He is survived by his daughter Linda Ahern and two sons.
