= Girl in Room 13 =

Girl in Room 13 may refer to:

- Girl in Room 13 (1960 film), an American film
- Girl in Room 13 (2022 film), an American television film

== See also ==
- The Woman in Room 13, a lost 1920 American silent mystery drama film
