= Sonny Cunha =

Hawaiian musician and politician (1879–1933)

Sonny Cunha, full name Albert Richard Cunha (October 1, 1879 – January 23, 1933) was an American composer, bandleader, pianist, singer, politician and entrepreneur. He was the first to popularize hapa haole music, a type of Hawaiian music with influences from popular music and with lyrics that are a combination of English and Hawaiian (or wholly English).

== Early years ==
Albert Richard Cunha was born on October 1, 1879, in Honolulu, Kingdom of Hawai'i to Angela Gilliland and Emmanuel Cunha. He was educated at Saint Louis School and Punahou School and later attended Yale Law School in 1898, where he was a star baseball and football star, although he did not graduate.

In 1903 he composed My Waikiki Mermaid, the earliest known hapa haole song. This was followed in 1905 by his first big hit, My Honolulu Tomboy. Other notable songs followed, My Hawaiian Maid, My Tropical Hula Girl and Honolulu Hula Girl.

In 1905 a sextette led by Cunha played the entire summer season at a California beach resort in Santa Cruz. In 1906 he directed the Royal Hawaiian Glee Club on their tour of the West Coast of the US with the Royal Hawaiian Band.

In 1914 he published the first hapa haole songbook, Famous Hawaiian Songs. He played piano, sang and led a dance orchestra in Honolulu for many years, toured the mainland, founded the Cunha Music Company (which sold instruments and presumably sheet music). He also served as a member of the House of Representatives in the Hawaii Territorial Legislature from 1923 to 1924.

His son was B movie director Richard E. Cunha.

He died on January 23, 1933, in Honolulu. He was buried at the Oahu Cemetery.

== Publications ==
- Songs of Hawaii, Bergstrom Music, 1903
- Famous Hawaiian Songs, Bergstrom Music, 1914

== Sources ==
- Kanahele, George S.; Berger, John, eds. (2012) [1979]. Hawaiian Music & Musicians (2nd ed.). Honolulu, HI, USA: Mutual Publishing, LLC. ISBN 9781566479677. OCLC 808415079.
