= Girl in Room 13 (1960 film) =

1960 film by Richard E. Cunha & H.E. Barrie

- Directed by: Richard E. Cunha
- Written by: Richard E. Cunha; H.E. Barrie
- Produced by: Marc Frederick; Michel Lebedka; Oswaldo Massaini; Konstantin Tkaczenko
- Starring: Brian Donlevy; Andrea Bayard
- Cinematography: Konstantin Tkaczenko
- Edited by: Carlos Coimbra
- Music by: Gabriel Migliori
- Production companies: Cinedistri; Layton Film Productions Inc. Sino Filmes
- Distributed by: Astor Pictures Corporation (1961) (USA) (theatrical); American International Television (AIP-TV) (1968) (USA) (TV) (syndication); National Telefilm Associates (NTA) (USA) (TV) (syndication)
- Release dates: 1960 (New York City, New York, USA); April 28, 1961 (Atlanta, Georgia, USA); May 18, 1967 (Mexico)
- Running time: 79 minutes
- Country: United States
- Language: English

Girl in Room 13 (also known as A Moça do Quarto 13 in Brazil, and as Agente secreto 013 in Mexico) is a 1960 American film starring Brian Donlevy and directed by Richard E. Cunha.

== Plot ==
American detective Steve Marshall goes to São Paulo, Brazil, in search of fugitive murderer Louise Dunning. Marshall contacts Louise and she explains that she murdered her husband in self-defense. Meanwhile, Marshall stumbles upon a counterfeiting ring and becomes a suspect. He unwittingly helps the police set a trap to catch the gang and, after a double-cross, the criminals are captured. Louise decides to remain in Brazil.

== Cast ==
- Brian Donlevy as Steve Marshall
- Andrea Bayard as Louise Dunning / Kitty Herman
- Victor Merinow as Victor Marlow
- Elizabeth Howard as Elizabeth
- John Herbert as Police Captain

== Reception ==
A review in TV Guide describes the film as a "Brazilian quickie," with "an aging Donlevy wasted as a private eye from the States who is tracking a murderer. [...] Not an elegant way for Donlevy to wind down his career." A synopsis of the film at AllMovie describes the Donlevy character as a "gringo gumshoe."
