= She Demons =

1958 film by Richard E. Cunha

- Theatrical release half-sheet display poster
- Directed by: Richard E. Cunha
- Written by: H.E. Barrie; Richard E. Cunha
- Produced by: Arthur A. Jacobs; Marc Frederic
- Starring: Irish McCalla; Tod Griffin; Victor Sen Yung
- Cinematography: Meredith M. Nicholson
- Edited by: William Shea
- Music by: Nicholas Carras
- Production company: Screencraft
- Distributed by: Astor Pictures
- Release date: December 1957
- Running time: 77 mins
- Country: United States
- Language: English
- Budget: $65,000 (estimated)

She Demons is a 1957 American independent black-and-white science fiction horror film, produced by Arthur A. Jacobs and Marc Frederic, directed and co-written by Richard E. Cunha, that stars Irish McCalla, Tod Griffin, and Victor Sen Yung. Made in the tongue-in-cheek style of Men's adventure magazines, Nazisploitation, and The Island of Lost Souls, the film was distributed by Astor Pictures in December, 1957 as a double feature with Cunha's Giant from the Unknown (1957).

== Plot ==
During a tropical storm, a pleasure boat is shipwrecked on an uncharted island and is presumed lost with all hands after the storm clears. The four survivors' shipboard radio can receive but not transmit, and they hear that their castaway island will soon be used by U.S. Navy aircraft as a bombing target.

Finding strange-looking human footprints and hearing the sound of jungle drums, three of the party explore the island. They soon discover the island is populated by deformed, fanged women who are the product of scientific experiments of Nazis led by a mad scientist and war criminal, who rules the island with an iron swastika.

The survivors eventually manage to blow up the island before the Navy jets can do so.

== Cast ==
- Irish McCalla as Jerrie Turner
- Tod Griffin as Fred Maklin
- Victor Sen Yung as Sammy Ching
- Rudolph Anders as Col. Karl Osler
- Gene Roth as Igor
- Leni Tana as Mona Osler
- Charles Opunui as Kris Kamana
- The Diane Nellis Dancers as The She Demons

== Production ==
After completing Giant from the Unknown, Astor Pictures told Richard Cunha that the film would only be accepted if he made another co-feature, to be released by Astor on a double bill. This led Cunha to make She Demons. Astor advanced $80,000, with Cunha completing the film for $65,000. Filming locations for She Demons were at Ferndale, California, Griffith Park, and Paradise Cove Pier in Malibu, California. David Koehler handled the special effects. H.E. Barrie, who co-wrote the screenplay, also wrote the scripts for two of Cunha's other 1950s films, Missile to the Moon and Frankenstein's Daughter.

== Reception ==
The Monthly Film Bulletin wrote: "The direction does nothing to enhance the lurid values of this impossible horror film, which unfolds on a jungle isle where the immaculately dressed villains live and work in a luxury mansion with fully equipped laboratory and foaming lava power generator to hand. The plot consists of a weary succession of convenient cliches, and the cast walk through their parts with noticeable lack of enthusiasm."

Variety wrote: "Mediocre film is actually more straight adventure than horror, although it fits adequately into the package top-bracketed by Giant from the Unknown. ... Principals handle their roles as well as script by Richard E. Cunha, who also directs, and H. E. Barrie permits. Miss McCalla has little to do but pout, but Griffin is properly heroic. Rudolph Anders is okay as the scientist and Victor Sen Yung is in for comedy relief. Meredith Nicholson's photography heads technical credits and special effects are expertly handled by David Koehler."

Writing in DVD Talk, film critic Glenn Erickson described the film as a "totally bizarre oddity" and "[o]ne of the sleaziest kiddie matinee movies of the '50s," but also "a great party picture with everything camp enthusiasts enjoy – terrible jokes, hammy acting, terrible direction."

Critic Joe Lozowsky wrote that the film is a "so-bad-it's good cult favorite," and that "[o]nce head moron Gene Roth shows up with his bad accent, you can't help but expect Moe, Larry, and Joe Besser to blunder onto the cardboard set and trade eye pokes."
