= The Snow Creature =

1954 film by W. Lee Wilder

- Theatrical release poster
- Directed by: W. Lee Wilder
- Written by: Myles Wilder
- Produced by: W. Lee Wilder
- Starring: Paul Langton; Leslie Denison; William Phipps; Teru Shimada
- Cinematography: Floyd Crosby
- Edited by: Jodie Copelan
- Music by: Manuel Compinsky
- Production company: Planet Filmplays
- Distributed by: United Artists
- Release date: November 1954
- Running time: 69 minutes
- Country: United States
- Language: English

The Snow Creature is a 1954 American science fiction-horror film produced and directed by W. Lee Wilder, for Planet Filmplays Inc., written by Myles Wilder, and starring Paul Langton.

== Plot ==
In an undisclosed Himalayan country, Dr. Frank Parrish leads a scientific expedition intent on collecting botanical samples. The team includes several sherpa men, including Subra, who leads the sherpas, as the only one who speaks English. Also along is photographer Peter Wells.

Shortly into their work, the expedition is thrown into upheaval when Subra's wife is kidnapped by what Subra insists is a Yeti. Unable to convince Parrish to pursue the Yeti, Subra seizes the expedition's guns and takes control. Parrish and Wells are forced to go along with the sherpas while looking for opportunities to overthrow Subra. However, as the team draws closer to the Yeti, evidence emerges that begins to change Parrish's opinion regarding the creature's existence.

Finally, the team makes contact with the snow creature, who hurls stones at them from atop his mountain refuge. The expedition tracks the creature to his cave, where they encounter it, along with two other Yeti, a female, and young one. Parrish forcibly prevents the enraged Subra from shooting the Yeti, reasoning that the creature is more valuable for science alive. The ensuing fight causes a cave-in, killing the female and child while knocking the male unconscious. In the confusion, Parrish gains control of the guns and the expedition, deciding to take the Yeti back to the United States for study.

The Yeti is transported first to Bombay and then California in a telephone-sized freezer. Upon reaching California, Parrish is confronted by reporters. Meanwhile, Wells has sold his photos of the Yeti and the ensuing articles have made things difficult for U.S. Customs, as they can't determine if the Yeti is an animal or a man. The Yeti is kept in quarantine while an anthropologist is brought in to determine the question of the Yeti's humanity. During this delay, the Yeti escapes from his containment and roams the city, attacking women. He hides in the cooler sewer system, also infiltrating meat lockers for food.

The police manage to track the Yeti to the sewers where they catch him in a large net. The Yeti continues to attack, beginning to throttle one of the policemen and is shot and killed.

== Cast ==
- Paul Langton as Frank Parrish
- Leslie Denison as Peter Wells
- Teru Shimada as Subra
- Rollin Moriyama as Leva
- Robert Kino as Inspector Karma
- Robert Hinton as Airline Manager
- Darlene Fields as Joyce Parrish
- George Douglas as Corey Jr.
- Robert Bice as Fleet
- Keith Richards as Detective Richards*
- Rudolf Anders as Dr. Dupont
- William Phipps as Lt. Dunbar
- Jack Daly as Edwards
- Rusty Wescoatt as Guard in Warehouse
- Lock Martin as the Yeti (uncredited)

- The film's end credits give actor Keith Richards the character name of "Harry Bennett", but there is no such character in the film and Richards, who does appear, is just called "Detective Richards".

== Production ==
The Snow Creature was one of the first of several Yeti/Abominable Snowman-themed movies. It also bore some resemblance to King Kong in terms of plot, with act one in an exotic setting, and act two taking place in an urban setting. The use of the Los Angeles storm drain system as the film's climactic setting can also be seen in the 1954 film, Them.

The first half of the movie takes place in an undisclosed Himalayan country but the actors portraying the locals speak Japanese.

== Reception ==
The Monthly Film Bulletin wrote: "A weak off-shoot of the science fiction school. The snow creature itself is an unconvincing monster, and the manner in which it repeatedly moves a few steps forward, followed by a few steps backward (always in the dark), becomes irritating. Later scenes are better contrived than the Himalayan episodes, though the finale in the sewers is hackneyed and unenterprisingly managed. Some of Floyd Crosby's lighting effects are intriguing, but otherwise there is little to commend in this mediocre production."

Variety wrote: "Snow Creature is bush league science fiction. Produced on a minimum budget, picture discloses an amateurish script, pedestrian direction, repetitive footage and uniformly unconvincing performances. ... Paul Langton, as the botanist, Leslie Denison, as his assistant and Teru Shimada, as a Tibetan guide, walk through their roles in colorlessly deadpan style, as does the rest of the supporting cast."

Film critic Leonard Maltin awarded the film one and a half out of a possible four stars, calling it "dull".

TV Guide wrote: "Billy Wilder's talentless brother put together this fourth-rate Abominable Snowman film (the first and the worst)". The reviewer also called the film's monster costume "phony".

The film was featured in an episode of Deadly Cinema.
