= Giant from the Unknown =

- Theatrical release half-sheet display poster
- Directed by: Richard E. Cunha
- Written by: Ralph Brooke; Frank Hart Taussig
- Produced by: Marc Frederic; Arthur A. Jacobs
- Starring: Ed Kemmer; Sally Fraser; Buddy Baer
- Cinematography: Richard E. Cunha
- Music by: Albert Glasser
- Distributed by: Astor Pictures
- Release date: December 25, 1957
- Running time: 77 minutes
- Country: United States
- Language: English

Giant from the Unknown (working titles Giant from Devil's Crag and The Diablo Giant) is a 1957 independently made American black-and-white science fiction-horror film drama, produced by Marc Frederic and Arthur A. Jacobs, directed by Richard Cunha, that stars Ed Kemmer, Sally Fraser, Morris Ankrum, Bob Steele, and Buddy Baer. The film was theatrically released by Astor Pictures in December, 1957 as a double feature with She Demons.

== Plot ==
Citizens of Pine Ridge, California worry about livestock mutilations and a recent murder in nearby Devil's Crag. Many suspect the deaths are rooted in something supernatural. A Native American dubbed Indian Joe confirms the town's fear of a tribal curse. But to prevent panic, Sheriff Parker banishes Joe from the premises. Parker is also wary of a local geologist, Wayne Brooks. There were rumors of animosity between him and the murder victim. Meantime, Professor Cleveland and his daughter Janet arrive. Dr. Cleveland plans to carry out archaeological research in Devil's Crag. However, the sheriff warns Cleveland about the recent trouble in that area. Later at dinner with Cleveland and Janet, Brooks, an ex-student of Cleveland's, offers to show him his collection of local artifacts. After dinner, Brooks takes them to his laboratory. As Cleveland examines Brooks' finds, Janet opens a box with a small lizard inside. Brooks explains that he found it inside a rock, where it had been in a state of suspended animation for a long time. As they converse, Indian Joe peers through a window, watching closely.

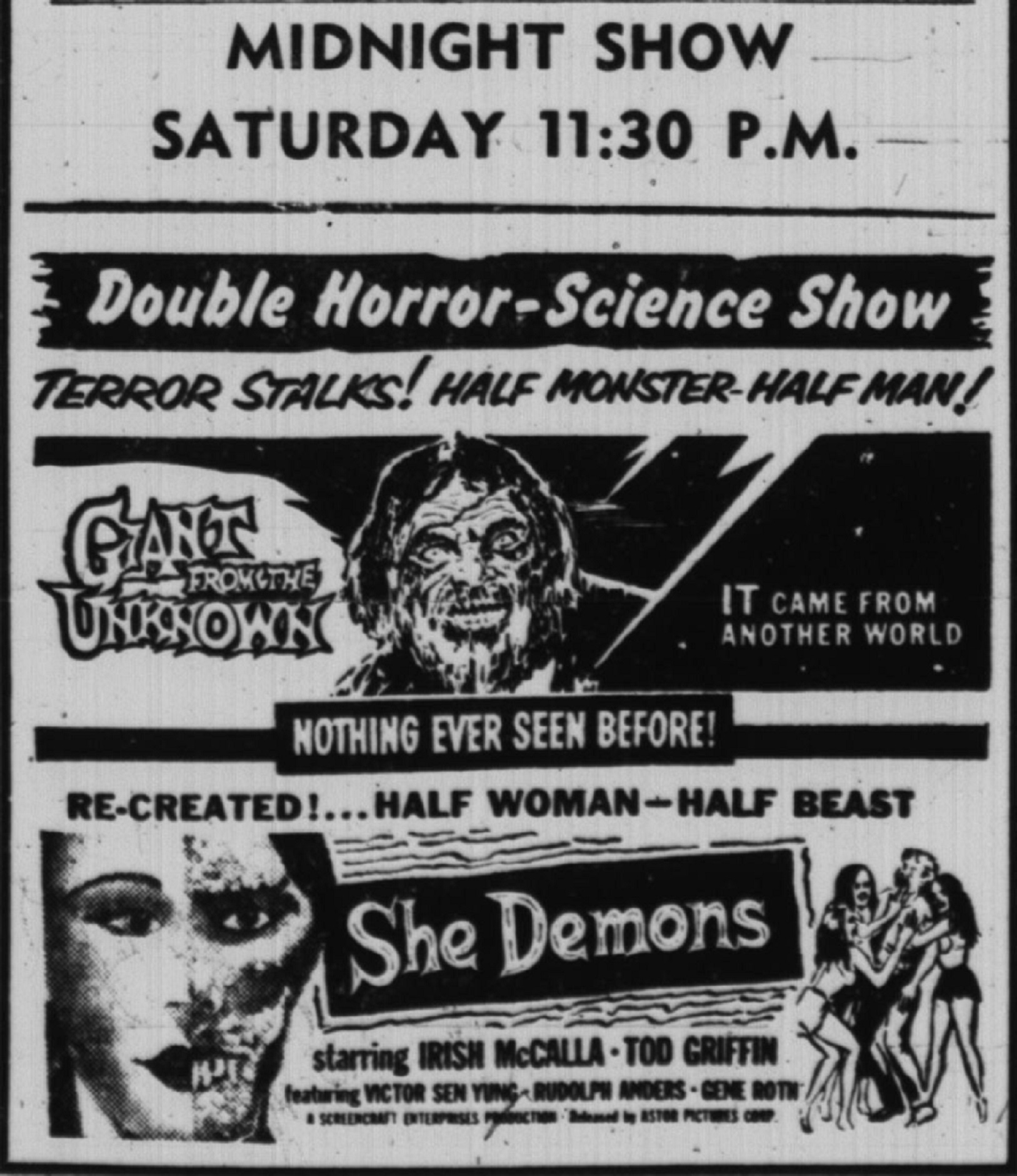
Midnight screening advertisement from 1958 for Giant from the Unknown and co-feature, She Demons

Later that evening, when Brooks and Janet return from a double feature, Cleveland calls them inside. He has pieced together broken fragments into a cross. He now theorizes that conquistadors visited the area hundreds of years before. The next morning Wayne guides Cleveland and his daughter to Devil's Crag, while Sheriff Parker follows them in his police car. Parker pulls up and chastises Brooks, reminding him that Devil's Crag is a danger zone. But Cleveland produces a research permit from the Commissioner of Public Lands. Further, he assures Parker that they are armed and can defend themselves. Though unconvinced, Sheriff Parker leaves the small group to set up camp. The next day, while Brooks examines the area, Indian Joe fires a rifle in Brooks' direction but claims he was just hunting rabbits. He then asks Brooks if he is there to rob Native American graves. Brooks assures him that he and Cleveland are only looking for Spanish artifacts. Joe agrees to hunt elsewhere, but he warns Brooks the place is evil.

Brooks returns to camp. He informs Cleveland that the area is physically changing. He suspects a recent electrical storm may have created this disturbance. So they break out metal detectors. However, an initial search reveals nothing. Then strictly by chance, Janet detects metal underground. The spot is excavated, revealing a cache of Spanish artifacts, armor, weapons, and bones. Brooks then discovers a rock formation similar to the one in which his lizard was entombed. He also unearths the handle of a massive axe, still intact. He believes it once belonged to a local legend known as The Diablo Giant. Unfortunately, Brooks is forced to exit the premises due to an electrical storm. After he leaves, the Diablo Giant (aka "Vargas") rises from the site's detritus. The next day, the group finds a large indentation in the ground. They also note the absence of the body armor and other artifacts unearthed earlier. They discuss the possibility that, like the lizard, Vargas is alive, having just been revived from a state of suspended animation.

That night, a centuries-old Vargas, awakened by a lightning strike, stalks and eventually kills a local teenager, Anne Brown. Sheriff Parker arrests Brooks and accuses him of Anne's murder. An old medallion, one of Brooks' excavated artifacts, was found clenched in the victim's hand. But after another brutal death, searchers conclude the Diablo Giant is roaming the wilderness. Pine Ridge locals help the sheriff hunt down Vargas, a one-man crime wave. Brooks eventually finds and kills Vargas, forcing him to fall from a bridge spanning a raging waterfall.

== Cast ==
- Ed Kemmer as Wayne Brooks
- Sally Fraser as Janet Cleveland
- Buddy Baer as Vargas the Giant
- Bob Steele as Sheriff Parker
- Morris Ankrum as Dr. Frederick Cleveland
- Oliver Blake as Cafe Proprietor
- Jolene Brand as Anne Brown
- Billy Dix as Indian Joe
- Gary Crutcher as Charlie Brown
- Ned Davenport as Townsman
- Ewing Miles Brown as Townsman

== Production ==
The make-up effects were created by Jack Pierce, known for his Universal Pictures' classic monster makeup for Boris Karloff's Frankenstein (1931), The Mummy (1932), and Lon Chaney Jr.'s The Wolf Man (1941). Baer, who played Vargas the Giant in this film, also played a giant in Jack and the Beanstalk (1952), starring Bud Abbott and Lou Costello. The film was shot in and around the town of Fawnskin, CA in the San Bernardino National Forest.

== Reception and legacy ==
American film director, producer, actor, and editor Joe Dante described this film on his webseries Trailers from Hell as: "The ads for "Giant' quote 'It came from another world' and today it really does, the vanished world of black-and-white double features that I for one really miss". In describing the film, critic Glenn Erickson wrote "Basically a light entertainment ‘posse western’ about a big, murderous bruiser who’s been sleeping in the woods since the 16th century, Giant from the Unknown can’t be described as brilliant or inspired," but added that "[o]n the plus side are the pleasantly silly performances," that "Richard Cunha’s direction is sound and his camerawork exceptionally good," and "Albert Glasser’s attention-getting music score is a big plus — it adds the mystery, suspense and danger that’s sometimes lacking in the visuals."

Giant from the Unknown was featured in 1996's late night TV show, "Nightmare Theater's Chill-O-Rama Horror Show".

It was also spoofed by RiffTrax on May 17, 2019.

== Home media ==
Giant from the Unknown was first released on DVD October 24, 2000. On March 2, 2012, the film was re-released on DVD by Image Entertainment. In 2020, Film Detective provided a Blu-ray of a restored widescreen version with audio commentary by Tom Weaver, Larry Blamire, Rick Cunha and archive recordings of Richard Cunha and producer Arthur A. Jacobs reminiscing about the movie.

== See also ==
- List of films in the public domain in the United States
- Living entombed animal
