= Curse of the Faceless Man =

1958 film

- Theatrical release poster
- Directed by: Edward L. Cahn
- Screenplay by: Jerome Bixby
- Produced by: Robert E. Kent
- Starring: Richard Anderson; Elaine Edwards; Adele Mara; Luis van Rooten
- Narrated by: Morris Ankrum
- Cinematography: Kenneth Peach
- Edited by: Grant Whytock
- Music by: Gerald Fried
- Production company: Robert E. Kent Productions
- Distributed by: United Artists
- Release date: August 14, 1958
- Running time: 67 minutes
- Country: United States
- Language: English

Curse of the Faceless Man is a 1958 independently made American low-budget black-and-white horror film, produced by Robert E. Kent, directed by Edward L. Cahn, that stars Richard Anderson, Elaine Edwards, Adele Mara, and Luis van Rooten. Science fiction writer Jerome Bixby wrote the screenplay. The film was theatrically released in the U.S. on August 14, 1958 by United Artists as a double feature with It! The Terror from Beyond Space.

The film's storyline concerns a Roman gladiator, buried alive in Pompeii during the eruption of Mount Vesuvius in A.D. 79, who returns to life in modern times to find the reincarnation of the woman he loves.

== Plot ==
During an archeological dig at Pompeii, a worker uncovers a jewel box and the calcified body of a gladiator. En route to the Museo di Napoli, the body comes to life and kills the driver of the truck that is transporting it. Afterwards, the body, apparently dead again, is found several meters away from the wrecked truck. Without witnesses, no one fully understands what has happened.

The director of the museum, Dr. Carlo Fiorello, asks Dr. Paul Mallon to help him study the body. Fiorillo tells Paul that he is not certain that the body is in fact dead, something Paul scoffs at, even though he finds fresh blood on its hands.

Meanwhile, Dr. Emanuel translates the Etruscan writing found on a bronze brooch that was inside the jewel box. It is a curse placed on his owners by Quintillus Aurelius, the gladiator who is now the faceless monster, somehow reanimated after 2,000 years.

Tina Enright, an artist and Paul's fiancée, shows him her latest painting. It is a portrait of Quintillus, who she knows only from her dreams. Paul confirms everything that she tells him and grows worried when she says that Quintillus is coming for her.

The police investigating the truck crash discount Paul's comment that the driver's blood is literally on Quintillus's hands, and Inspector Rinaldi orders the museum closed until the murderer is caught. That night, Tina sneaks in to sketch Quintillus. He arises and walks toward her. She screams, a watchman runs in and shoots Quintillus, but the bullets have no effect. Tina faints, Quintillus kills the watchman, then places the bronze brooch on Tina's jacket. By the time help arrives, Quintillus is again immobile.

To confirm that Quintillus can move, the scientists place the brooch near him. Quintillus gets up, picks up the brooch and approaches them menacingly. Paul strikes him with an axe without making a scratch. Quintillus knocks Paul unconscious, breaks through a door and heads for Tina's apartment. When Paul recovers and everyone arrives at Tina's, they find a motionless Quintillus at her feet. Quintillus is taken back to the museum and strapped down to prevent him escaping again. His being more-or-less alive is explained by Fiorillo, who says that he was preserved by radioactivity in the volcanic ash and that he has been revitalized by the X-rays used to study him.

Emanuel takes Tina to the "Cove of the Blind Fisherman", which she says people fled into while trying to escape the volcano's ancient eruption, even though she has never heard of the cove before. Emanuel hypnotically regresses Tina and plays a recording for Paul. She says that she was the object of Quintillus' affections in ancient Pompeii, but asks "How can I return his love? I am an aristocrat. He is a slave and it is not permitted..." Stopping in mid-sentence, she then describes the eruption of Vesuvius as if it is happening. Paul remains skeptical, but Emanuel produces a photo of an ancient sculpture of a woman who looks exactly like Tina. Emanuel says that the woman was the daughter of the Roman senator who owned Quintillus.

Tina, in a trance, cuts the bonds restraining Quintillus. He carries her off to save her from what he sees in his mind – the eruption that buried Pompeii in A.D. 79. Quintillus carries her into the waters of the Cove of the Blind Fisherman. Paul, the other scientists and the police can do nothing to stop Quintillus but, to their amazement, Quintillus simply dissolves in the seawater. Paul rescues Tina, who cannot remember what happened.

== Cast ==
- Richard Anderson as Dr. Paul Mallon
- Elaine Edwards as Tina Enright
- Adele Mara as Maria Fiorillo
- Luis Van Rooten as Dr. Carlo Fiorello
- Gar Moore as Dr. Enrico Ricci
- Felix Locher as Dr. Emanuel
- Jan Arvan as Inspector Rinaldi
- Bob Bryant as Quintillus Aurelius

== Production ==
The film was produced by Vogue Pictures during late March 1958 on a seven-day shooting schedule and a small budget of just $100,000. It was directed by Edward L, Cahn and produced by Robert E. Kent, with Edward Small as uncredited executive producer. Make-up effects for the Faceless Man character were done by Layne Britton, with Bob Bryant playing Quintillus. The monster suit was designed by Charles Gemora. The film's working title was The Man Without a Face. Though uncredited, Vic Perrin served as the film's voice over narrator.

Filming locations included the Griffith Observatory in Los Angeles, used as the set for the Museo di Napoli, and the beach at Portuguese Bend, standing in for the Cove of the Blind Fisherman.

The film's plot bears several similarities to Universal Studios' 1932 Pre-Code film The Mummy. Both features include a love affair between the main characters (in this case Paul and Tina) and both monsters awaken in modern times to discover the reincarnation of their ancient lovers (Tina, again).

Anderson later referred to the film as "another thing I was doing on my way to somewhere else, that trained me for television".

== Release ==
The Curse of the Faceless Man's U.S. release was on August 14, 1958 as the second half of a double feature with It! The Terror from Beyond Space. The single pressbook for both films referred to It! as "Chiller No. 1" and Curse as "Chiller No. 2", and described both as "the two most hellish horror hits that ever turned blood to ice!!!"

United Artists distributed Curse of the Faceless Man to U.S. theaters. It opened in the U.K. in November 1958 at a running time of 72 minutes, receiving an X certificate from the British Board of Film Censors, which "only permitted a film to be exhibited to persons over the age of 16". The film was released theatrically at unspecified dates in Brazil and Spain and also in Mexico, where it was distributed by Peliculas Bank de Mexico SA.

Still a second feature almost 60 years after its first release, Curse of the Faceless Man was shown in August 2016 as the bottom half of a double feature with the 1967 British film It! at the historic Balboa Theater in San Francisco. It was part of a weeknight horror film series sponsored by The Overlook Theater website and shown at various theaters around the Bay Area.

== Reception ==
Reviewers have pointed out a degree of poignancy on the part of the monstrous Quintillus as he searches for the reincarnation of the woman he loves. American science fiction film scholar Bill Warren noted that a 1958 review of the film in the Motion Picture Herald said that "there is in the primeval surge of the blind, grappling relic of historic tragedy, a certain poignance". American film critic Bryan Senn agreed, writing that "while little more than a walking statue, this Vesuvian villain's doomed motivation and unique appearance combine to make it a monster both poignant and creepy".

Curse of the Faceless Man has otherwise received both positive and negative assessments.

Warren said that although "the production values are good for a low budget film, and the entire movie has a certain crispness...the story is preposterous" and the film is a "sluggish slumgullion of fantasy and science fictional ideas". To Warren, Curse of the Faceless Man was primarily a "pedestrian, preposterous film that works up a little interest by the end, but it is too late and not enough to save the picture". He further noted that "the story is hopeless" and that the film "often looks as if it had no director at all". He called the camerawork "perfunctory". Warren did point out that the film was made at a time when reincarnation was a "hot topic" because of the publicity surrounding the then-current "Bridey Murphy business" and that reincarnation was "dropped into the film", which was otherwise "science fiction because that's what audiences of 1958 were buying".

While Senn wrote that Anderson's performance "creates one of the dullest and least appealing heroes" of the 1950s, he also said that cinematographer Kenneth Peach's "moody lighting" produced shadows which highlighted "the alien-ness of [Quintillus'] hardened crust appearance". He described the film as being "saddled with an unsteady script [and] occasional dull stretches" and called the direction "pedestrian".

British film critic Phil Hardy wrote that although "the plot is little more than an ingenuous reworking of The Mummy (1932)" the film is "tolerably gripping thanks to a lucidly economical script by [Jerome] Bixby (a short story writer of uncommon wit, oddly neglected by Hollywood)" and has "a neat twist at the end" when Quintillus dissolves.

American film critic John "J.J." Johnson wrote that the Quintillus make-up "did not elicit many chills and thrills from its audience. Sometimes, just being a monster is not enough".

Allmovie gave the film a positive review, stating "Gerald Fried's music, especially the twisting suspense theme accompanying Quintillus' awakening and wanderings, keeps the tension high, and the costuming and special effects make the picture work far better than its budget or its reputation would lead one to expect".

== Legacy ==
Segments from Curse of the Faceless Man were included in It Came from Hollywood, a comedy-documentary that was released theatrically in 1982; Curse was referred to in the 1985 comedy-horror-thriller Dead End; and the US theatrical trailer was featured in the 2007 video Out of This World Super Shock Show.

== Home media ==
The film was released on DVD by the MGM Limited Edition Collection on June 28, 2011. It was released on Blu-ray by Kino Lorber on February 16, 2016.

== See also ==
- List of American films of 1958
