= Richard E. Cunha =

American cinematographer

- Born: Richard Earl Cunha; March 4, 1922; Honolulu, Hawaii
- Died: September 18, 2005 (aged 83); Oceanside, California
- Occupations: Cinematographer, director, writer
- Family: Father Albert "Sonny" Cunha (songwriter)

Richard Earl Cunha (March 4, 1922 – September 18, 2005) was an American cinematographer and film director. Cunha's father was Albert "Sonny" Cunha, an American songwriter.

== Career ==
During World War II, Cunha served as an aerial photographer for the military, and then was transferred to Hal Roach Studios in Los Angeles, where he made military training films, newsreels and documentaries.

After the war, Cunha worked as a TV photographer, eventually working his way to up director of photography for the TV shows Death Valley Days and Branded.

Cunha wrote and directed only a handful of films, with his four best-known ones all being low-budget, sci fi-horror B-movies released in 1958 by Astor Pictures -- Giant from the Unknown, She Demons, Missile to the Moon, and Frankenstein's Daughter.

In an interview with The Astounding B Monster Archive, Cunha said his low-budget films had "budgets [that] were under $80,000, and we tried very hard to bring them in for approximately $65,000 or less," that the "shooting schedules were always six days," and "you don't run over on these low-budget films - you shoot the opening scenes and the end scenes, and then fill in the picture in between."

== Selected filmography ==
=== As cinematographer ===
- Red Rock Outlaw 1950
- Death Valley Days (TV) 1952
- Giant from the Unknown 1958
- Bloodlust! 1961
- The Silent Witness 1964
- Le Proscrit (TV) 1965

=== As director ===
- She Demons with Irish McCalla, Ted Griffin, Victor Sen Yung, Rudolph Anders. 1958
- Giant from the Unknown with Ed Kemmer, Sally Fraser, Buddy Baer 1958
- Missile to the Moon with Richard Travis, Cathy Downs, K.T. Stevens, Tommy Cook. 1958 (a remake of Cat-Women of the Moon (1953))
- Frankenstein's Daughter with John Ashley, Sandra Knight, Donald Murphy, Sally Todd, Harold Lloyd. 1958
- Girl in Room 13. 1960
- Dog Eat Dog. 1964

=== As writer ===
- She Demons. 1958
- Girl in Room 13. 1960
