= Missile to the Moon =

1958 film by Richard E. Cunha

- Theatrical release poster
- Directed by: Richard E. Cunha
- Written by: H. E. Barrie; Vincent Fotre
- Produced by: Marc Frederic
- Starring: Richard Travis; Cathy Downs; K. T. Stevens; Leslie Parrish
- Cinematography: Meredith M. Nicholson
- Edited by: Everett Dodd
- Music by: Nicholas Carras
- Production company: Layton Film Productions
- Distributed by: Astor Pictures
- Release date: December 15, 1958
- Running time: 78 minutes
- Country: United States
- Language: English
- Budget: $65,000

Missile to the Moon is a 1958 independently made American black-and-white science fiction film drama, produced by Marc Frederic, directed by Richard E. Cunha, that stars Richard Travis, Cathy Downs, and K. T. Stevens. The film was distributed by Astor Pictures and is a remake of an earlier Astor Pictures-distributed film, Cat-Women of the Moon (1953). Missile to the Moon was released in late 1958. It played theatrically on December 15, 1958 as a double feature with Cunha's Frankenstein's Daughter (1958).

A spaceship blasts off from Earth with five aboard, but one of them is secretly a Moon man returning home. He dies by accident during the trip to the Moon. What the remaining four find waiting for them when they arrive on the Moon is well beyond their expectations: huge rock creatures, giant lunar spiders, and a cave-dwelling civilization made up of beautiful women.

== Plot ==
Two escaped convicts, Gary and Lon, are discovered hiding aboard a rocket by scientist Dirk Green, who then forces them to pilot the spaceship to the Moon. Dirk, who is secretly a Moon man, wants to return home. Dirk’s friend, Steve Dayton, and Steve’s fiancée, June Saxton, are aware that the vessel is getting ready to launch, so they go to the spacecraft to investigate. Unwittingly, they lock themselves in and become passengers when the ship takes off. During the flight, they encounter a meteor shower that results in Dirk receives a fatal head wound. Before he dies, Dirk asks Steve to remain on course, hands him a medallion, and tells him that upon landing he should seek forgiveness from “the Lido."

After landing on the Moon, everyone puts on space suits with oxygen regulators. Soon, they are attacked by rock monsters, unaffected by bullets shot at them. Hiding in a cave, they successfully light a torch and come to realize that there is oxygen on the Moon, allowing them to remove their space suits and helmets. While in the cave, they succumb to a mysterious gas. Waking up later, they find themselves in an underground community of beautiful women. Steve is brought to the queen, "Lido", who believes he is Dirk. She thanks Dirk for his return as the Moon is running out of oxygen and soon they will all die.

Gary introduces himself to one of the Moon girls and soon discovers that the Moon has a diamond mine. Back in the palace rooms, Steve tells June that Dirk left the tribe for Earth years ago to return with a ship to help them. Fearing that Lido may discover his true identity, Steve tells June that a marriage with Alpha, one of the blonde Moon girls, has been arranged and he must marry her. Alpha then enters the room and tells Steve it is time for the wedding and kisses him. Jealous, June attacks her and the two women engage in a hair-pulling catfight. Alpha then realizes the deception and informs Lido, but still insists on marrying Steve. In a power struggle, Alpha kills Lido and becomes the new queen. June and the other men are forced into a cave where they are stalked by a giant spider. Another Moon girl, Zema, has fallen in love with Lon decides to help the earthlings, freeing Lon, June and Gary from the cave and returning the confiscated space suits. In a power struggle with Alpha, who wants June, Lon, and Gary killed, Zema detonates a bomb, allowing the oxygen to escape but not before Steve, June, Gary and Lon have donned their space suits.

As they make their escape, Gary runs back to the cave to retrieve diamonds but is killed in a struggle with one of the rock monsters before reaching the safety of the ship.

As the ship prepares to lift off for Earth, June asks Steve if she is more attractive than Alpha. Steve, tells June the only thing prettier than her is Earth.

== Cast ==
- Richard Travis as Steve Dayton
- Cathy Downs as June Saxton (Note: Cathy Downs appeared in her final film role.)
- K. T. Stevens as the Lido
- Tommy Cook as Gary Fennell
- Gary Clarke as Lon
- Michael Whalen as Dirk Green
- Nina Bara as Alpha
- Laurie Mitchell as Lambda
- Marjorie Hellen (Leslie Parrish) as Zema
- Henry Hunter as Colonel Wickers
- Lee Roberts as Sheriff Cramer
- Pat Mowry as Moon girl
- Tania Velia as Moon girl (Note: Tania Velia was "Miss Yugoslavia, 1952".)
- Sanita Pelkey as Moon girl
- Lisa Simone as Moon girl
- Mary Ford as Moon girl (Note: Mary Ford is incorrectly billed in the film as "Miss Minnesota," confusing her with a different Mary Ford.)
- Marianne Gaba as Moon girl
- Sandra Wirth as Moon girl

== Production ==
Missile to the Moon was an even lower-budget remake of the low-budget science fiction film drama Cat-Women of the Moon (1953) and closely follows the plot details of that earlier feature. That film offered 3D as its big attraction, but all its male characters were middle-aged. The 1958 remake opted to better appeal to a teenage audience by adding a pair of youthful escaped convicts, one a good kid who had made a mistake, the other an incorrigible crook, and providing them with lunar love interests in due course. In the 1953 film, the bit players portraying the minor Moon maidens are described as "Hollywood cover girls"; in the remake, they are credited as "international beauty contest winners".

A red camera filter was used to make the blue sky photograph very dark on the black-and-white film, but the result was still far from the ideal starry black. Bits of scrubby vegetation could be seen in the background of some shots. No attempt is made to convince the viewer that the Moon is an airless void where humans would weigh one-sixth their normal Earth weight. When one of the space-suited astronauts is forced into direct sunlight, unshielded from its intensity, he bursts into flames, despite the lack of an external oxygen atmosphere; in seconds he is reduced to a skeleton.

The large, slow-moving rock creatures have a passing resemblance to the shape of Gumby, the popular stop motion clay animation children's television character introduced in 1955.

The giant spider prop was wire-controlled from above; it is exactly the same "Moon spider" used five years earlier in Cat-Women of the Moon.

Nina Bara, in the role of the evil, scheming, back-stabbing Alpha, was familiar to genre audiences from her role as Tonga on the television series Space Patrol (1950-1955). Popular 1960s/1970s television and film star Leslie Parrish also co-stars, billed under her real name Marjorie Hellen.

== Reception and legacy ==
The film is regarded as a drive-in camp classic. Film historians Kim R. Holston and Tom Winchester noted that the film was a "low-budget, scientifically inaccurate hoot". Film reviewer Glenn Erickson commented on DVD Talk that the film "is nobody's idea of a good movie ... a hoot, a real knee-slapper," but added "how can the worst space movie ever made, be the worst space movie ever made, if it's such a delight?" Writing in AllMovie, critic Paula Gaita described the film as "woefully cheap and naïve," but noted that it "offers a wealth of juvenile delights, with its improbable monsters, wonky science, and serial-style hidden civilization." A review of the film in TV Guide described it as "a third-rate science fiction picture" that is "bad enough for a laugh."

The film was twice spoofed on RiffTrax (first by Michael J. Nelson of Mystery Science Theater and Fred Willard, then by Nelson, Bill Corbett and Kevin Murphy who were also MST3K alumni).

== See also ==
- List of American films of 1958
- List of killer arachnid films
- B movie
