= Rudolph Anders =

German actor (1895–1987)

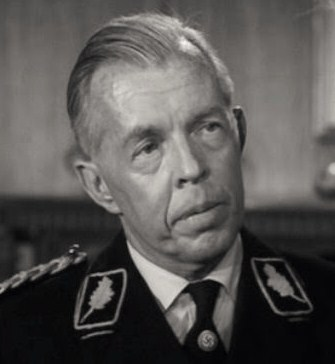
- Anders in She Demons (1958)
- Born: Rudolf Franz Amendt; December 17, 1895; Waldkirch, Baden, Germany
- Died: March 27, 1987 (aged 91); Woodland Hills, Los Angeles, California, U.S.
- Other name: Robert O. Davis
- Occupation: Actor
- Years active: 1930–1965

Rudolph Anders (December 17, 1895 – March 27, 1987) was a German character actor who came to the United States after the rise of Hitler, and appeared in numerous American films in the 1940s, 1950s, and 1960s.

== Biography ==
He was born Rudolf Franz Amendt in Waldkirch, Baden, Germany. Shortly following the rise of Hitler in Germany he emigrated to the United States, where he was naturalized an American citizen in 1934. During the 1940s, he used the stage name of Robert O. Davis, and after the War used the name Rudolph Anders. His German-accented English confined him largely to "accent roles", and during World War II to villain parts, although not leading roles as his small build, wide eyes, soft voice and naturally quiet demeanor did not allow him to appear overly menacing.

Anders was married. He died in Woodland Hills, Los Angeles, California.

== Partial filmography ==
- Ludwig II, King of Bavaria (1930) - Diener (uncredited)
- Peter Voss, Thief of Millions (1932)
- Primavera en otoño (1933) - Tristán
- When Strangers Marry (1933) - Von Arnheim
- Ladies Must Love (1933) - Wallace - Bill's Butler (uncredited)
- La ciudad de cartón (1934) - Primer director
- Stamboul Quest (1934) - Karl
- The Fountain (1934) - Geof Van Leyden
- Las fronteras del amor (1934) - Otto Van Ritter
- Hell in the Heavens (1934) - Lieutenant Schroeder
- Here's to Romance (1935) - Violinist (uncredited)
- I Live My Life (1935) - Minor Role (uncredited)
- Rendezvous (1935) - Radio Operator (uncredited)
- De la sartén al fuego (1935) - Sargento Groebner
- Last of the Pagans (1935) - Superintendent's Assistant (uncredited)
- The Golden Arrow (1936) - Lord Max (uncredited)
- Girls' Dormitory (1936) - Minor role (uncredited)
- We're in the Legion Now! (1936) - Sergeant Groeber
- Champagne Waltz (1937) - Emperor Franz Joseph (uncredited)
- Thin Ice (1937) - German Reporter (uncredited)
- I Met Him in Paris (1937) - Romantic Waiter (scenes deleted)
- The Big Broadcast of 1938 (1938) - Bartender (uncredited)
- Confessions of a Nazi Spy (1939) - Captain Straubel
- Conspiracy (1939) - Machine Gunner (uncredited)
- Espionage Agent (1939) - Paul Strawn
- Pack Up Your Troubles (1939) - Von Richtman (uncredited)
- The Mad Empress (1939) - Herzfeld
- Escape to Paradise (1939) - Alexander Komac
- Four Sons (1940) - Hempel
- The Mortal Storm (1940) - Gestapo Official Hartman (uncredited)
- The Man I Married (1940) - Storm Trooper (uncredited)
- Knute Rockne All American (1940) - Elder in Norway (uncredited)
- The Great Dictator (1940) - Tomanian Commandant at Osterlich
- Arise, My Love (1940) - Prussian Officer (uncredited)
- Meet the Wildcat (1940) - Feral - Henchman
- Mr. Dynamite (1941) - Butler (uncredited)
- Shining Victory (1941) - Police Officer Exiling Paul (uncredited)
- Underground (1941) - Official (uncredited)
- A Dangerous Game (1941) - Dr. Fleming
- Down in San Diego (1941) - Henry Schrode
- King of the Texas Rangers (1941 serial) - His Excellency (Chs. 1,3,6,10-12)
- Nazi Agent (1942) - Cab Driver (uncredited)
- To Be or Not to Be (1942) - Gestapo Sergeant at Desk at Top of Hotel Stairs (uncredited)
- Spy Smasher (1942 serial) - Dungeon Colonel Von Kohr (Ch. 1)
- Eagle Squadron (1942) - German Squad Leader (uncredited)
- The Phantom Plainsmen (1942) - Colonel Eric Hartwig
- Riders of the Northland (1942) - Nazi Agent
- The Pied Piper (1942) - Lieutenant
- Berlin Correspondent (1942) - Guard at Airport (uncredited)
- The Secret Code (1942 serial) - Rudi Thysson
- Sherlock Holmes and the Voice of Terror (1942) - Schieler - Nazi at Church (uncredited)
- Desperate Journey (1942) - Kruse
- Junior Army (1942) - Horner - Nazi Saboteur
- The Great Impersonation (1942) - Karl Hofmann
- Sherlock Holmes and the Secret Weapon (1942) - Braun (uncredited)
- Chetniks! The Fighting Guerrillas (1943) - Mounted Officer (uncredited)
- They Got Me Covered (1943) - Gerhardt (uncredited)
- Assignment in Brittany (1943) - Orderly (uncredited)
- Tonight We Raid Calais (1943) - German Lieutenant
- Watch on the Rhine (1943) - Oberdorff
- The Strange Death of Adolf Hitler (1943) - Maj. Mampe
- The Hitler Gang (1944) - Dr. Stenglein (uncredited)
- The Story of Dr. Wassell (1944) - Wounded Dutch Soldier (uncredited)
- Counter-Attack (1945) - Stillman
- Escape in the Desert (1945) - Hoffman
- Under Nevada Skies (1946) - Alberti
- Her Sister's Secret (1946) - Birdman
- Dangerous Millions (1946) - Rudolph Busch
- Act of Violence (1949) - German (voice, uncredited)
- Kill or Be Killed (1950) - Gregory Marek
- Target Unknown (1951) - Doctor (uncredited)
- Actor's and Sin (1952) - Otto Lachsley (segment "Actor's Blood")
- Phantom from Space (1953) - Dr. Wyatt
- South Sea Woman (1953) - Captain van Dorck
- Captain Scarface (1953) - Dr. Yeager
- Magnificent Obsession (1954) - Dr. Fuss
- King Richard and the Crusaders (1954) - Austrian Knight (uncredited)
- Jungle Gents (1954) - Dr. Goebel
- A Star Is Born (1954) - Mr. Ettinger (uncredited)
- The Snow Creature (1954) - Dr. Louis Dupont
- Alfred Hitchcock Presents (1956) (Season 1 Episode 35: "The Legacy") as Cafe Host
- The Walter Winchell File (1957, Episode: "The Candlestick") - Kalisch
- She Demons (1958) - Colonel Karl Osler
- Frankenstein 1970 (1958) - Wilhelm Gottfried
- A Private's Affair (1959) - Dr. Leyden
- On the Double (1961) - Oberkommandant
- The Pigeon That Took Rome (1962) - Oberst Krafft
- The Prize (1963) - Mr. Rolfe Bergh
- Decision at Midnight (1963) - Uncle
- 36 Hours (1965) - Dr. Winterstein (uncredited)
