= From the Earth to the Moon (film) =

1958 American sci-fi film

- Theatrical release poster
- Directed by: Byron Haskin
- Screenplay by: Robert Blees; James Leicester; Dalton Trumbo (uncredited)
- Based on: From the Earth to the Moon; 1865 novel by Jules Verne
- Produced by: Benedict Bogeaus
- Starring: Joseph Cotten; George Sanders; Debra Paget
- Narrated by: Robert Clarke (uncredited)
- Cinematography: Edwin B. DuPar
- Edited by: James Leicester
- Music by: Louis Forbes
- Production companies: Waverly Productions; RKO Radio Pictures
- Distributed by: Warner Bros. Pictures
- Release date: November 6, 1958 (U.S.)
- Running time: 101 minutes
- Country: United States
- Language: English

From the Earth to the Moon is a 1958 American Technicolor science fiction film, produced by Benedict Bogeaus, directed by Byron Haskin, that stars Joseph Cotten, George Sanders, and Debra Paget. Production of the film originated at RKO Pictures, but when RKO went into bankruptcy, the film was acquired and released by Warner Bros. Pictures.

From the Earth to the Moon is a film adaptation of Jules Verne's 1865 science fiction novel of the same name.

== Plot ==
Shortly after the end of the American Civil War, munitions producer Victor Barbicane announces that he has invented a new explosive, "Power X", which he claims is much more powerful than any previously devised. Metallurgist Stuyvesant Nicholl scoffs at Barbicane's claims and offers a wager of $100,000 ($2.4 million today) that it cannot destroy his invention, the hardest metal in existence. Barbicane stages a demonstration using a puny cannon and demolishes Nicholl's material (and a portion of the countryside).

President Ulysses S. Grant requests that Barbicane cease development of his invention after several nervous countries warn that continuing work on Power X could be considered an act of war. Barbicane agrees, but when he discovers that pieces of Nicholl's metal retrieved from the demonstration have somehow been converted into an extremely strong yet lightweight ceramic, he cannot resist the chance to construct a spaceship to travel to the Moon. He recruits Nicholl to help build the ship. Meanwhile, Nicholl's daughter Virginia and Barbicane's assistant Ben Sharpe are attracted to each other.

After completing the spaceship, Barbicane, Nicholl, and Sharpe board it and, amid much fanfare, take off. Once they are in outer space, the strongly religious Nicholl reveals that he has sabotaged the vessel, believing that Barbicane has flouted God's laws. When it is discovered that Virginia has stowed away, Nicholl cooperates with Barbicane in a desperate attempt to save her. Sharpe is knocked out, and he and Virginia are placed in the safest compartment of the ship. Barbicane and Nicholl then fire rockets that send the young couple on their way back to Earth, while the two scientists land on the Moon in another section, with no way off. They are able to signal to the young couple that they have reached the Moon safely.

== Cast ==
- Joseph Cotten as Victor Barbicane
- George Sanders as Nicholl
- Debra Paget as Virginia Nicholl
- Don Dubbins as Ben Sharpe
- Patric Knowles as Josef Cartier
- Carl Esmond as Jules Verne
- Henry Daniell as Morgana
- Melville Cooper as Bancroft
- Ludwig Stössel as Aldo Von Metz
- Morris Ankrum as President Ulysses S. Grant (uncredited)
- Robert Clarke as Narrator (voice, uncredited)

== Production ==
Blacklisted screenwriter Dalton Trumbo was brought in to give the script "a quick polish".

Location shooting for From the Earth to the Moon took place in Mexico.

Various electronic sound effects in the film score were reused from MGM's soundtrack for Forbidden Planet (1956), composed by Louis and Bebe Barron.
