= Sally Fraser =

American actress (1932–2019)

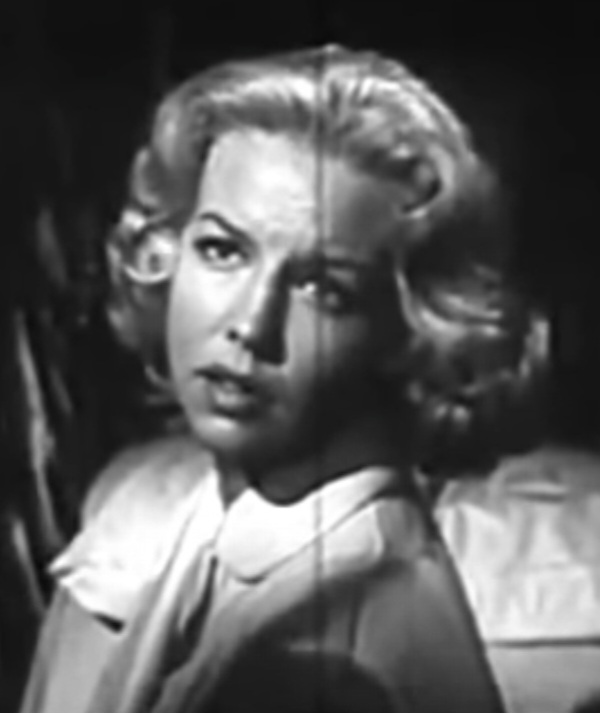
- Fraser in an episode of One Step Beyond (1960)
- Born: December 12, 1932
- Died: January 13, 2019 (aged 86)
- Occupation: Actress
- Years active: 1952–1970
- Spouse: Allan S. Johnson (m. 1955–2019)

Sally Fraser (December 12, 1932 – January 13, 2019) was an American actress who appeared on television and in numerous films. She became best known for appearing in low-budget science fiction films of the 1950s.

== Early years ==
Fraser was born on December 12, 1932, in Williston, North Dakota, the daughter of John and Gladys Fraser. The family moved to Canoga Park, a suburb of Los Angeles. Her father bought a feed store there, and Sally helped him in it. She sang on local radio and television, and her photograph appeared on covers of regional magazines. She participated in musical programs at Canoga High School, where she graduated in 1950.

== Career ==
Spotted after singing on a local TV show, Fraser was encouraged to take drama lessons and eventually gained experience in stage plays. On television, she appeared opposite Tyler MacDuff in the Western series, Annie Oakley, in the episode "The Saga of Clement O'Toole". She also appeared on Guy Madison's series, The Adventures of Wild Bill Hickok. She was in the 1954 TV presentation of A Christmas Carol starring Fredric March, in the role of "Belle, sweetheart of Scrooge's youth, and as the Spirit of Christmas Past."

On May 27, 1954, Fraser was part of the Anderson family in a pilot for the television version of Father Knows Best. The pilot was broadcast as an episode of Ford Television Theatre. Fraser played the older daughter but (as with all others in the family except Robert Young) was not cast as part of the regular series.

In 1955, Fraser (along with Jil Jarmyn) completed two pilot episodes of Behind the Scenes (not to be confused with a latter Public Broadcasting Service series of the same name), a series about the "adventures of two girls trying for movie careers in Hollywood."

Fraser eventually became typecast in low budget 1950s sci-fi films. She played a wife possessed by aliens in the Roger Corman film It Conquered the World (1956), the sister of the titular monster in War of the Colossal Beast (1958), and a mother protecting her baby in Earth vs. the Spider (1958). She was briefly onscreen as the United Nations receptionist who introduces Cary Grant's character to Philip Ober's Lester Townsend in Hitchcock's North by Northwest, and also appeared in Giant from the Unknown (1958).

In 1959, Fraser appeared as Martha Maitland on an episode of The Texan.

She continued to work on television and the stage into the 1960s until she decided to retire to raise her family. Fraser moved to Idaho in the 1980s and lived on a cattle ranch.

== Personal life ==
Fraser married entrepreneur Allan S. Johnson on April 17, 1955.

She died in 2019, at age 86.

== Partial filmography ==
- All I Desire (1953) – Daughter in Auditorium (uncredited)
- Flight Nurse (1953) – Best Girl (uncredited)
- It's a Dog's Life (1955) – Dorothy Wyndham
- The Adventures of Champion (1956, TV Series) – Beth Collier
- It Conquered the World (1956) – Joan Nelson
- Giant from the Unknown (1958) – Janet Cleveland
- War of the Colossal Beast (1958) – Joyce Manning
- Earth vs. the Spider (1958) – Mrs. Helen Kingman
- Roadracers (1959) – Joanie Wilson
- North by Northwest (1959) – UN Receptionist #1 (uncredited)
- Elmer Gantry (1960) – Prostitute (uncredited)
- Dangerous Charter (1962) – June
