= Glenn Erickson =

American film editor and film critic

- Born: United States
- Occupations: Film editor, film critic, writer

Glenn Erickson is an American film editor and film critic. A graduate of the UCLA School of Theater, Film and Television, he started in the film industry in 1975 as an editor of low-budget films and later worked in minor technical crew capacities for the major films Close Encounters of the Third Kind (1977) and 1941 (1979). As an editor, his credits include supplemental documentary materials for DVD releases of films, including The Good, The Bad, and the Ugly (1966), Buckaroo Banzai (1985) and To Live and Die in L.A. (1985). He was nominated for an Emmy Award in 2001 for his editing of the Jack Cardiff montage tribute screened at the 73rd Academy Awards presentation. In 1997, he produced the restoration of the original ending to Kiss Me Deadly (1955).

Erickson is a member of the Online Film Critics Society (OFCS). Since 1999, he has written a DVD review column, DVD Savant. In 2005, a collection of reviews from his column was published in book form as DVD Savant: A Review Resource Book. In 2009 he was a runner-up in the "DVD Reviewer of the Year" category at the Rondo Hatton Classic Horror Awards. In November 2011 he released his second DVD Savant book, Sci-Fi Savant: Classic Sci-Fi Review Reader.
