= Frankenstein 1970 =

1958 science fiction horror film directed by Howard W. Koch

- theatrical release poster
- Directed by: Howard W. Koch
- Screenplay by: Richard H. Landau; George Worthing Yates
- Story by: Aubrey Schenck; Charles A. Moses
- Based on: Frankenstein characters in 1818 novel by Mary Shelley
- Produced by: Aubrey Schenck
- Starring: Boris Karloff; Tom Duggan; Jana Lund; Donald Barry; Charlotte Austin
- Cinematography: Carl E. Guthrie
- Edited by: John A. Bushelman
- Music by: Paul Dunlap
- Production company: Aubrey Schenck Productions
- Distributed by: Allied Artists Pictures Corporation
- Release date: July 20, 1958
- Running time: 83 minutes
- Country: United States
- Language: English
- Budget: $110,000

Frankenstein 1970 is a 1958 science fiction/horror film, shot in black and white CinemaScope, starring Boris Karloff and featuring Don "Red" Barry. The independent film was directed by Howard W. Koch, written by Richard Landau and George Worthing Yates, and produced by Aubrey Schenck. It was released theatrically in some markets on a double feature with Queen of Outer Space.

== Plot ==
In 1970, the aging Baron Victor von Frankenstein had suffered torture and disfigurement at the hands of the Nazi Party as punishment for not cooperating with them in their medical experiments during World War II which left him with a scar on the left side of his hand and a limp. He nevertheless continues his work as a scientist performing the experiments his ancestor Richard Freiherr von Frankenstein I (who lived from 1702-1961) did as he does not have much time left to live.

Needing funds to support his experiments after covering up his experiments to his friend Wilhelm Gottfried, the Baron allows a television crew led by director Douglas Row and consisting of public relations worker Mike Shaw, film star Carolyn Hayes, Doug's assistant Judy Stevens, and cinematographer Morgan Haley to shoot a horror film about his monster-making family at his castle in Germany with Hans Himmler portraying Frankenstein's monster.

This arrangement gives the Baron enough money to buy an atomic reactor, which he uses to create a living being modeled after his own likeness before he had been tortured as he tests the reanimated monster. When the Baron runs out of body parts for his work, he starts by obtaining the heart and brain of his butler Schutter when he stumbles upon the laboratory. Then he kills Gottfried and claims his eyes when the eyes of Judy and Morgan proved to be not compatible with the body.

Finally, the completed Monster turns on the Baron and Victor tries to reason with Schutter as they are both killed in a blast of radioactive steam from the reactor that the Monster unknowingly releases. After the reactor is shut down and the radiation falls to safe levels, a police investigation occurs. The bandages on the Monster's head are removed by Doug to show its face and an audio tape is played back in which the Baron reveals that he had intended for the Monster to be a perpetuation of himself because he was the last of the Frankenstein family line.

== Cast ==
- Boris Karloff as Baron Victor von Frankenstein, a disfigured mad scientist who is the descendant of Richard Freiherr von Frankenstein I
- Tom Duggan as Mike Shaw, a public relations worker for the documentary crew
- Jana Lund as Carolyn Hayes, a young film star who takes part in the documentary
- Donald Barry as Douglas Row, the director of the documentary
- Charlotte Austin as Judy Stevens, Doug's ex-wife and assistant
- Irwin Berke as Inspector Raab, a police inspector who is summoned to investigate the deaths around Frankenstein's castle
- Rudolph Anders as Wilhelm Gottfried, a friend of Victor who handles his finances
- Norbert Schiller as Schutter, Frankenstein's faithful butler
- John Dennis as Morgan Haley, the cinematographer of the documentary
- Mike Lane as
  - Hans Himmler, a large actor portraying Frankenstein's monster in the documentary
  - the Monster, a creation of Victor brought to life by his atomic reactor

== Production ==
Producer Aubrey Schenck had a three-picture deal with Boris Karloff.

The movie was shot at the Warner Bros. studio in a mere eight days on a modest budget. The main set was borrowed from Too Much, Too Soon (1958).

The title Frankenstein 1970 was intended to add a futuristic touch. During preproduction, alternative titles included Frankenstein's Castle, Frankenstein 1960, and Frankenstein 2000.

Allied Artists released the film, after purchasing it for $250,000.

== Home media ==
For years, the only home video release available of Frankenstein 1970 was a pan and scan version on VHS. In October 2009, Warner Bros. included the film on the DVD Karloff & Lugosi Horror Classics, along with three other movies. This release of Frankenstein 1970 features an audio commentary track by co-star Charlotte Austin and fan historians Tom Weaver and Bob Burns. Frankenstein 1970 was released in 2019 on Blu-ray as part of the Warner Archive Collection.

Howard Stern talked about the movie on his SiriusXM radio show. His father, Ben Stern would watch it on television and would call Howard "Schutter".
