= K. T. Stevens =

American actress (1919–1994)

K.T. Stevens
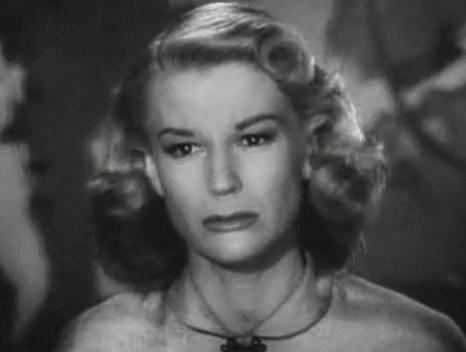
- Stevens in Harriet Craig, 1950
- Born: Gloria Wood; July 20, 1919; Hollywood, California, U.S.
- Died: June 13, 1994 (aged 74); Brentwood, Los Angeles, California, U.S.
- Occupation: Actress
- Years active: 1921–1994
- Spouse: Hugh Marlowe (m. 1946; div. 1968)
- Children: 2, including Chris Marlowe
- Father: Sam Wood

K.T. Stevens (born Gloria Wood; July 20, 1919 – June 13, 1994) was an American film and television actress.

== Early years ==
Stevens was born in Hollywood, the daughter of film producer and director Sam Wood. She made her first film appearance when she was just two years old in her father's second silent film, Peck's Bad Boy (1921).

As an adult, she changed her name to K.T. Stevens to distance herself from her father's fame. She initially called herself Katherine Stevens, which people often shorted to Katie, leading to the final version with the initials K.T.

== Stage ==
Stevens gained theatrical experience by doing summer stock theatre in Skowhegan, Maine. Her Broadway credits include The Land Is Bright, Yankee Point, Nine Girls and Laura.

== Film ==
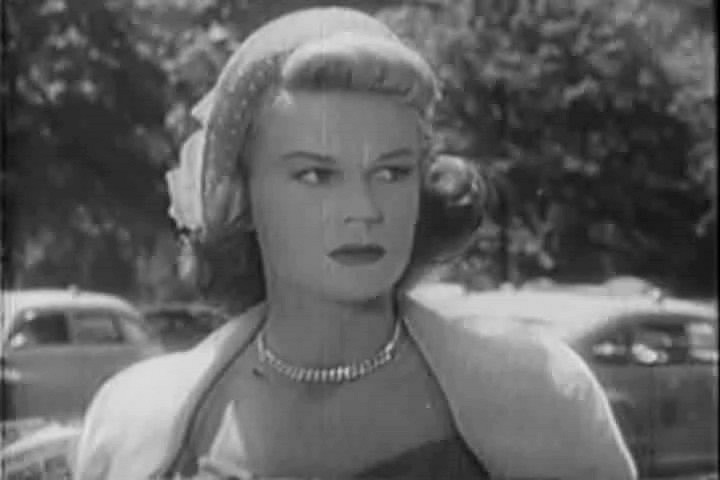
K.T. Stevens in Port of New York

Stevens appeared in a number of films in the 1940s and 1950s, including Kitty Foyle (1940, directed by her father) with Ginger Rogers, The Great Man's Lady (1942) with Barbara Stanwyck, Address Unknown (1944), Port of New York (1949) with Yul Brynner, Harriet Craig (1950) with Joan Crawford and Vice Squad (1953) with Edward G. Robinson. She also appeared as Phyllis in the 1969 hit movie Bob & Carol & Ted & Alice. Her last film role before her death from lung cancer was in the 1994 Whoopi Goldberg film Corrina, Corrina.

== Television ==
Stevens acted on episodic television in such series as Crossroads, The Rebel, The Brothers Brannagan, and appeared on the daytime soap operas General Hospital as part of the original cast (1963–1965), portraying Peggy Mercer who was engaged to Dr. Steve Hardy, Julie Olson's mother-in-law Helen Martin (1966–1967, 1969) on Days of Our Lives and The Young and the Restless (1976–1981) as the veiled, facially burned Vanessa Prentiss. In the episode "New Neighbors" of the sitcom I Love Lucy, she played opposite Hayden Rorke as television actors who Lucy Ricardo mistakenly believes are foreign secret agents.

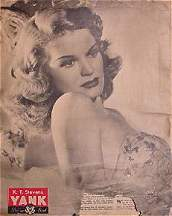
Pin-up photo of K.T. Stevens in the issue of Yank, the Army Weekly on June 25, 1944

Stevens appeared in 1957 and again in 1961 in different roles on The Real McCoys. In 1959, she made her first of three guest appearances on Perry Mason as murder victim Ethel Garvin in "The Case of the Dubious Bridegroom." In 1962, she played Margit Bruner in "The Case of the Ancient Romeo," and in 1965, she played Alice Munford in "The Case of the Hasty Honeymooner." In this episode, she was featured as the wife of murderer Guy Munford, played by her then husband Hugh Marlowe. In 1961, she played Ada Kihlgren in "The Broken Wing", one of the latter episodes of Dick Powell's Zane Grey Theatre. The same year, she appeared as Lorraine Miller in "A Great Day for a Scoundrel" on The DuPont Show with June Allyson. Between 1960 and 1963, she guest-starred five times on The Rifleman.

She portrayed Lieutenant Harriet Twain in the Buck Rogers in the 25th Century episode "Return of the Fighting 69th".

== Personal life and death ==
Stevens married actor Hugh Marlowe on May 7, 1946, in San Francisco. They had two sons, Jeffrey and Christian. The couple divorced in 1968. Stevens and Marlowe acted in the Broadway production of Laura in which, credited as "A Girl" so as not to alert the audience, she played the title role (acted by Gene Tierney in the 1944 film Laura).

Stevens died at her home in Brentwood, Los Angeles, on June 13, 1994, aged 74, after battling lung cancer.

== Filmography ==
| Year | Title | Role | Notes |
|---|---|---|---|
| 1921 | Peck's Bad Boy | Henry's Sweetheart | |
| 1921 | Don't Tell Everything | Cullen's niece | Lost film |
| 1940 | Kitty Foyle | Molly | |
| 1942 | The Great Man's Lady | Girl Biographer | |
| 1944 | Address Unknown | Griselle Eisenstein aka Griselle Stone | |
| 1949 | Port of New York | Toni Cardell | |
| 1950 | Harriet Craig | Clare Raymond | |
| 1953 | Vice Squad | Ginny | |
| 1953 | Tumbleweed | Louella Buckley | |
| 1956 | Alfred Hitchcock Presents | Liza | Season 2 Episode 5: "None Are So Blind" |
| 1956 | Jungle Hell | Dr. Pamela Ames | |
| 1957 | Wagon Train | Violet | Season 1, Episode 11: "The Zeke Thomas Story" |
| 1958 | Missile to the Moon | The Lido | |
| 1959 | Perry Mason | Ethel Garvin | Season 2 Episode 29: "The Case of the Dubious Bridegroom" |
| 1962 | Perry Mason | Margit Bruner | Season 5 Episode 28: "The Case of the Ancient Romeo" |
| 1962 | The Alfred Hitchcock Hour | Alice | Season 1 Episode 10: "Day of Reckoning" |
| 1965 | Perry Mason | Alice Munford | Season 9 Episode 7: "The Case of the Hasty Honeymooner" |
| 1969 | Bob & Carol & Ted & Alice | Phyllis | |
| 1970 | Adam at 6 A.M. | | Uncredited |
| 1973 | Pets | Mrs. Daubrey | |
| 1984 | They're Playing with Fire | Lillian Stevens | |
| 1994 | Corrina, Corrina | Mrs. Morgan | |

== See also ==
- Pin-ups of Yank, the Army Weekly
