= Ed Kemmer =

American actor (1921–2004)

- Kemmer in Death Valley Days, 1962
- Born: Edward William Kemmerer; October 29, 1920; Reading, Pennsylvania, U.S.
- Died: November 9, 2004 (aged 84); New York City, U.S.
- Occupation: Actor
- Years active: 1954–1983
- Spouses: Elaine Edwards (divorced); Fran Sharon (m. 1969)
- Children: 3

Ed Kemmer (né Edward William Kemmerer; October 29, 1920 – November 9, 2004) was an American motion picture and television actor.

== Career ==
Kemmer was born Edward William Kemmerer in Reading, Pennsylvania, as Edward William Kemmerer, and served as a fighter pilot with the United States Army Air Forces during World War II. He was shot down over France and spent 11 months in a POW camp. He briefly escaped from the camp for two weeks before being recaptured.

Kemmer made his television debut in 1951 and starred as Buzz Corry in the live television science fiction action-drama Space Patrol (1951-1956). Kemmer made his film debut in 1956 (Behind the High Wall). He had a starring role as a pilot in the film The Hot Angel (1958), but his big-screen work was mostly small roles in low-budget B movies such as Giant from the Unknown (1958). The bulk of Kemmer's work was for the small screen.

After Space Patrol, Kemmer was a guest star in various prime-time television series, including the classic Twilight Zone episode "Nightmare at 20,000 Feet", in which former space hero Kemmer co-starred with future space hero William Shatner. He also made two guest appearances on Perry Mason. In 1960 he played Roger Porter in "The Case of the Frantic Flyer," and in 1961 he played murder victim Leslie Hall in "The Case of the Pathetic Patient." In 1964 he played a major part in ”The Impostor”, a tense Sutton Roley-directed episode of Combat! (S3, E10).

Kemmer starred for two years as an American astronaut in the soap opera The Clear Horizon, leading to the later phase of his career as a leading player in various daytime drama series, including The Edge of Night (on which he met his wife, actress Fran Sharon) as Malcolm Thomas, The Secret Storm as Paul Britton #2, As the World Turns as attorney Dick Martin, and Somerset as attorney Ben Grant. He also made appearances as a doctor on All My Children.

In 1962, Kemmer was cast as the historical investigative journalist Henry Morton Stanley in the episode, "The Truth Teller," on the syndicated television Anthology series, Death Valley Days, hosted by Stanley Andrews. The episode is a study of the Medicine Lodge Indian Peace Treaty. Stanley arrives at Fort Larned, Kansas, to assess Hancock's effort to avoid war on the frontier. Charles Carlson filled the role of Wild Bill Hickok, long after Guy Madison played Hickok in a weekly syndicated series.

== Personal life ==
Kemmer was twice married and had three children, Jonathan, Todd, and Kimberly.

On November 5, 2004, Kemmer suffered a stroke in New York City. He died four days later, aged 84.

== Filmography ==
Year	Title	Role	Notes
1955	Alfred Hitchcock Presents	Ben Verber	Season 1 Episode 11: "Guilty Witness"
1956	Behind the High Wall	Charlie Rains	
1957	Sierra Stranger	Sonny Grover	
1957	Maverick	Clete Overton	
1957	Calypso Joe	Lee Darling	
1957	Panama Sal	Dennis P. Dennis	
1958	Giant from the Unknown	Wayne Brooks	
1958	Too Much, Too Soon	Robert Wilcox	
1958	Earth vs. the Spider	Professor Art Kingman	
1958	Hong Kong Confidential	Frank Paige	
1958	The Hot Angel	Chuck Lawson	
1958	Official Detective	Joe Esposito	Episode: "Loan Companies"
1959	Wanted: Dead or Alive	Aben Starr	Episode: Reunion for Revenge
1959	Sleeping Beauty	Prince Philip	Performance Model
1960	Wanted: Dead or Alive	Adam Smith / William Davis	Episode: The Inheritance
1960	The Crowded Sky	Caesar	
1960	Requiem to Massacre	Soldier #2	Two episodes of Cheyenne entitled Gold, Glory and Custer - Requiem
1961	Perry Mason	Leslie Hall	Episode: The Case of The Pathetic Patient
1963	A Gathering of Eagles	Pilot	Uncredited
1964	Combat!	Lt. Tracey	Episode: The impostor
1965	Mara of the Wilderness	First Pilot	
1973	Executive Action	Reporter	Uncredited
