= Attack of the Puppet People =

1958 film

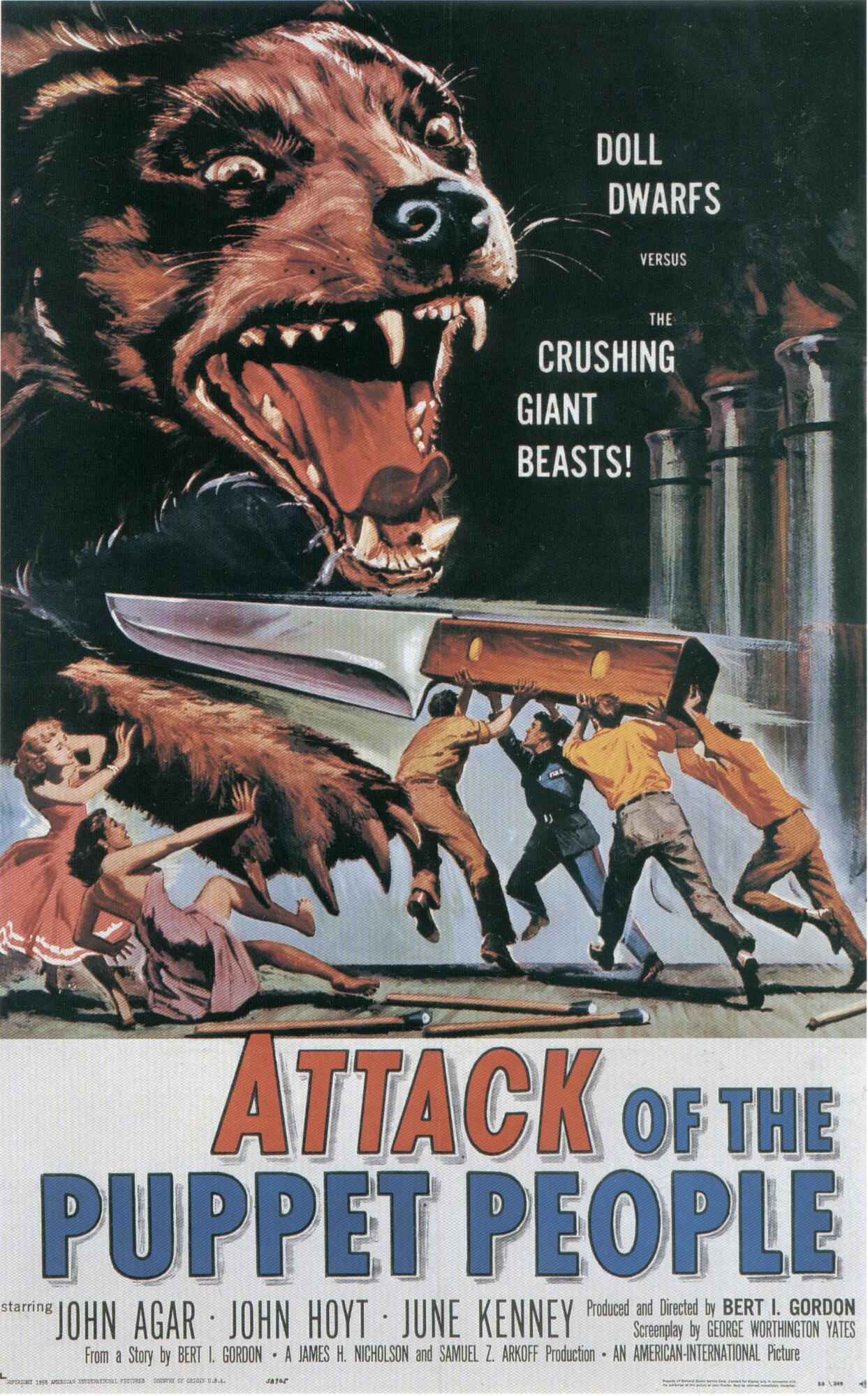
- Theatrical release poster by Reynold Brown
- Directed by: Bert I. Gordon
- Screenplay by: George Worthing Yates
- Story by: Bert I. Gordon
- Produced by: Bert I. Gordon
- Starring: John Agar; John Hoyt; June Kenney; Susan Gordon
- Cinematography: Ernest Laszlo
- Edited by: Ronald Sinclair
- Music by: Albert Glasser
- Production company: Alta Vista Productions
- Distributed by: American International Pictures
- Release date: June 30, 1958
- Running time: 79 minutes
- Country: United States
- Language: English

Attack of the Puppet People (retitled Six Inches Tall for its U.K. release) is a 1958 American black-and-white science fiction horror film produced and directed by Bert I. Gordon. It stars John Agar, John Hoyt, and June Kenney. Gordon also supervised the film's special effects. American International Pictures released the film on June 30, 1958 as a double feature with War of the Colossal Beast (1958). (Historian Bill Warren lists the double feature's release date as August 7, 1958.)

The film was rushed into production by AIP and Bert I. Gordon to capitalize on the popular success of Universal-International's The Incredible Shrinking Man, released the previous year in 1957.

== Plot ==
The doll manufacturing company Dolls Inc. is owned and operated by Mr. Franz, who has a personal collection of very lifelike dolls stored in glass canisters locked in a display case on a wall. Sally Reynolds answers a newspaper advertisement for a secretary position. Although unnerved by Franz’s extremely friendly and pushy manner, she is ultimately moved to take the job by his appeals over how short-handed the company is.

A traveling salesman, Bob Westley, comes to the office, and he and Sally develop a relationship. After working at the doll factory for several weeks, Bob makes a marriage proposal to Sally. He persuades her to quit her job, promising to break the news to Franz.

The next day, however, Franz tells Sally that Bob has returned home to take care of extended business. She finds it completely implausible that Bob would abandon her in such a manner, and notices a new doll in Franz’s collection that looks just like Bob. She goes to the police, claiming that Franz has shrunken Bob and added him to his doll collection. Sergeant Paterson is skeptical until Sally names Janet Hall, the secretary who preceded her and Ernie Larson, a postman she heard had vanished after a visit to Dolls, Inc.; both are listed as missing persons. Confronted by Paterson, Franz says his dolls are all modeled on people he knows, and shows him a complete run of Bob dolls to prove the resemblance to a shrunken Bob is meaningless.

Franz implores Sally to stay at Dolls, Inc. despite her reporting him to the police. When she refuses, he uses a machine to shrink her down to doll size. He uses the shrinking machine on anyone who tries to leave him. All the "dolls" in his glass case are friends put in suspended animation. He revives Bob and four others as company for Sally.

During a welcoming party for the two newcomers, Franz is visited by his friend Emil, who wants Franz to repair his marionettes for an upcoming production. Franz mentions to Emil that he has been afraid of being abandoned ever since his wife left him, unconsciously explaining his “doll” abductions. The small prisoners have access to a phone, but their voices are too small to be heard over the phone lines, and loud music on a record player is drowning out their voices. Sergeant Paterson continues investigating Franz, with Sally and Bob now confirmed as missing. After Franz is questioned again by Paterson, he decides to kill his prisoners and himself before he is caught. He takes his "collection" to an old theater, supposedly to test his repairs made on Emil's marionette. There, he throws one final party, forcing his captives to act-out Dr. Jekyll and Mr. Hyde.

The prisoners drug Franz’s coffee with one of the capsules used to keep them in suspended animation and escape while Franz is occupied with a theater worker. Separated from the others, Bob and Sally head to Franz's workshop, planning to go back for the others after using Franz’s device to restore themselves. Franz returns to his workshop, but not before they have returned to normal size. They go to the police, leaving a despondent Franz behind.

== Cast ==
- John Agar as Bob Westley
- John Hoyt as Mr. Franz
- June Kenney as Sally Reynolds
- Michael Mark as Emil
- Jack Kosslyn as Sergeant Paterson
- Marlene Willis as Laurie
- Ken Miller as Stan
- Laurie Mitchell as Georgia Lane
- Scott Peters as Mac
- Susan Gordon as Agnes
- June Jocelyn as Brownie Leader
- Jean Moorhead as Janet Hall
- Jamie Forster as Ernie Larson
- Bill Giorgio as Janitor

== Production ==
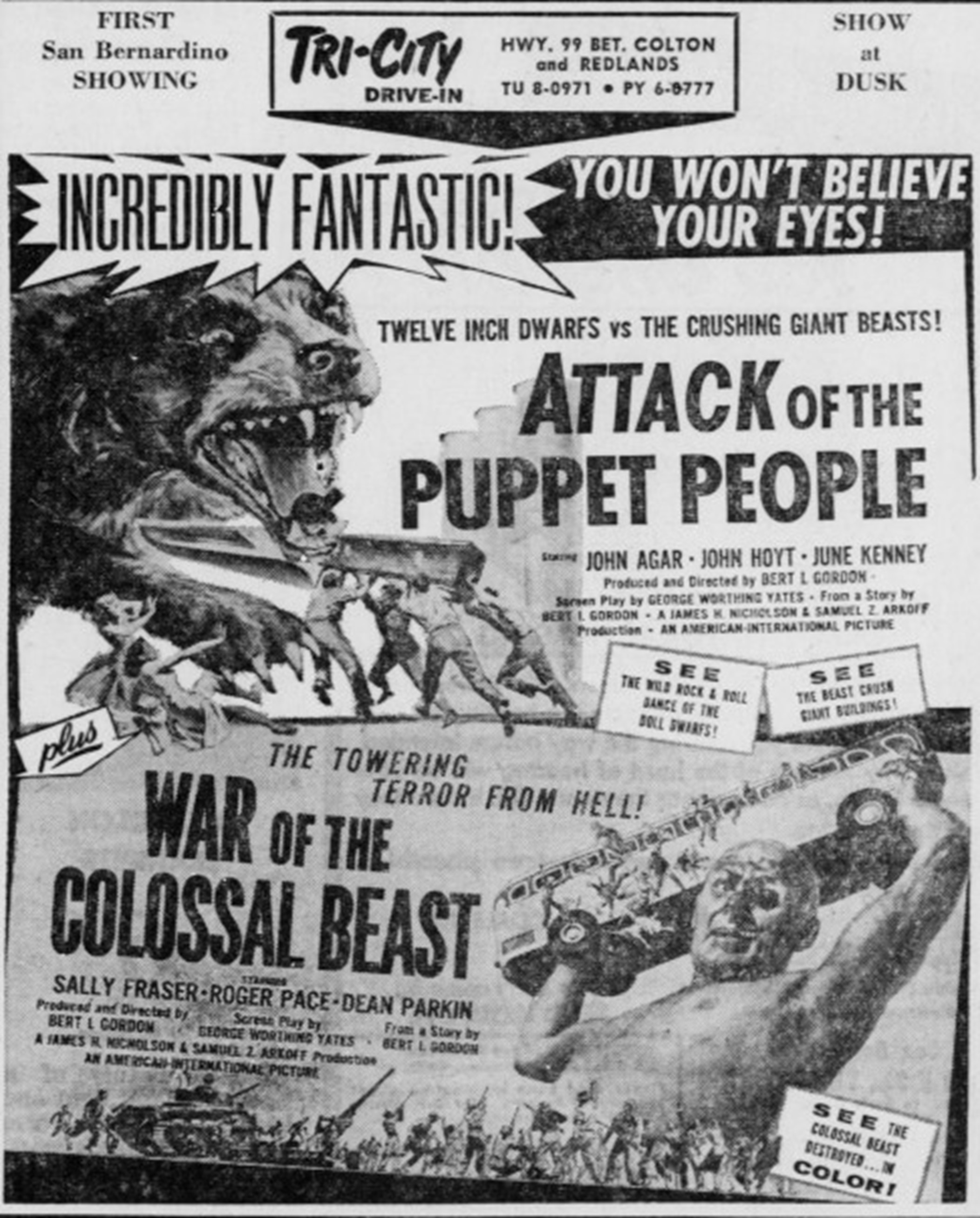
Drive-in advertisement from 1958 for Attack of the Puppet People and co-feature, War of the Colossal Beast.

The film was shot under the title The Fantastic Puppet People. Director Bert I. Gordon said the title was changed to make the film more salable, since he targeted it primarily for teenagers. Gordon's daughter, Susan Gordon, was a last-minute substitute for another child actress who was ill and unable to perform.

Because of the size-changing aspects of the plot, the film made extensive use of special effects and over-sized props. These included a giant telephone borrowed from the phone company and a number of props made by Paul Blaisdell. Split screen was also extensively used to make the "puppet people" appear miniature while in the same frame as normal-sized characters like Franz (John Hoyt).

According to actor Ken Miller, who played Stan, after doing the scene where Bob (John Agar) climbs down from the table, Bob was so sore that he could not move properly, and a masseur had to be brought in for him the following day. Miller likewise found climbing up to the doorknob arduous, since the rope he climbed was made of rubber that stretched as he climbed.

A scene from The Amazing Colossal Man, another of Gordon's films, is shown playing on a drive-in theater screen. The film's plot was reused for the French film Le Manteau de Glace.

== Critical reception ==
At the time of its release, the Los Angeles Times called the film "rather well-done minor-key science fiction", particularly praising the script. Film critic Glenn Erickson wrote in Trailers From Hell that the "screenplay can’t do much with [the] shaky story premise," that the film "is a bizarre opportunity mostly missed, not because it’s silly but because it’s too tame — it doesn’t take any of its interesting ideas far enough," that "producer-director Gordon has bitten off such a large chunk of special effects that important pieces of his story go missing," and that the "effects are impressive for the cost outlay, but that makes them imaginative and resourceful, not necessarily Good or Effective." Writing in AllMovie, critic Hal Erickson identified the film as "one of the few 'mad scientist' opuses of the 1950s to be motivated by loneliness rather than megalomania," but that "most of the acting is amateurish, with the exception of the always reliable John Hoyt; the special effects are somewhat better, but still nothing to write home about." A review in TV Guide reported that "good miniature work and clever camera angles pull off the special effects, but the story is pretty silly and good only for laughs."

== Home media ==
Attack of the Puppet People was released on DVD by Warner Home Video as part of their Warner Archive Collection. Shout Factory released the film November 14, 2017 on Region A Blu-ray. The transfer was made using a 2K scan of the film's interpositive, in its original widescreen 1:85:1 aspect ratio. Film historian Tom Weaver provides an audio commentary track. The film's theatrical release trailer is also included. Weaver and Dr. Robert J. Kiss talk about the making and distribution of the film on the audio commentary.

== In popular culture ==
In the 1958 film Earth vs. the Spider, Mike Simpson (Gene Persson) mentions that the Attack of the Puppet People is playing at his father (Hal Torey)'s theater during a phone call with Carol Flynn (June Kenney).

Donald Barthelme's 1961 short story "The Hiding Man" features two characters viewing the film.

The Watergate burglary lookout, Alfred C. Baldwin III was watching Attack of the Puppet People on television at the time of the break-in. Distracted by the film, he failed to notice a police car pulling up at the scene in time for his accomplices to make their escape. This is portrayed in the HBO series White House Plumbers where Baldwin is portrayed by Zak Orth.

This same motif of shrinking people occurred in the British TV series The Avengers episode "Mission... Highly Improbable".

== See also ==
- List of American films of 1958
- List of films featuring miniature people
- Dr. Shrinker

== Bibliography ==
- David Wingrove, Science Fiction Film Source Book (Longman Group Limited, 1985)
