= Hank Patterson =

American actor and musician (1888–1975)

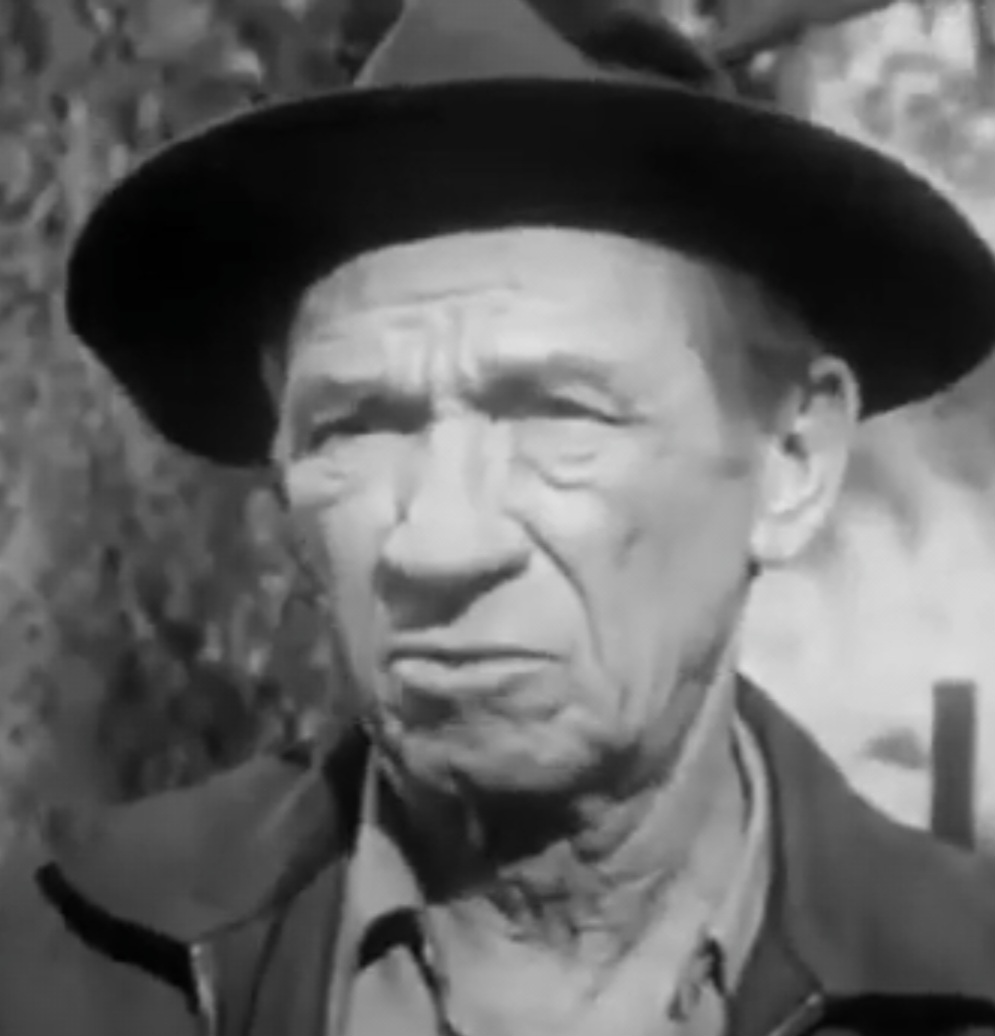
- Patterson in Lock-Up (1961)
- Born: Elmer Calvin Patterson; October 9, 1888; Springville, Alabama, US
- Died: August 23, 1975 (aged 86); Woodland Hills, California, US
- Resting place: Forest Lawn Memorial Park (Hollywood Hills)
- Occupations: Actor, musician
- Years active: 1939–1975
- Relatives: Téa Leoni (great-niece)

Elmer Calvin "Hank" Patterson (October 9, 1888 – August 23, 1975) was an American actor and musician. He is known foremost for playing two recurring characters on three television series - stableman Hank Miller on Gunsmoke and farmer Fred Ziffel on both Petticoat Junction and Green Acres.

== Early life ==
Patterson was born in Springville, Alabama, one of seven children of Green Davis Patterson, an insurance agent, and Mary Isabell "Mollie" Newton Patterson. By the 1890s, his family had moved to Taylor, Texas, where he spent most of his boyhood and attended school through eighth grade. In 1917, he was registered for World War I in Lubbock County, Texas.

Patterson had intended to be a serious pianist, but instead became a vaudeville piano player. By the end of the 1920s, he moved to California. He entered the movie business as an actor during the 1930s. His earliest identified screen work was an uncredited appearance in the Roy Rogers' Western film The Arizona Kid (1939).

== Movies and TV ==
Patterson found plenty of movie work, mainly playing cantankerous types and blacksmiths, hotel clerks, farmers, shopkeepers, and other townsmen, usually bit roles and character parts in Republic Pictures Westerns, and then in television Westerns such as The Cisco Kid, The Adventures of Kit Carson, The Lone Ranger, and Annie Oakley. He also had small cameo appearances in a number of sci-fi movies by Bert I. Gordon: Beginning of the End, The Amazing Colossal Man, Attack of the Puppet People, and Earth vs. The Spider.

Patterson played recurring or different roles in adult/family TV Westerns, including the role of Hank Miller in 33 episodes of Gunsmoke from 1962 through 1973, on Have Gun - Will Travel (11 episodes), Death Valley Days (nine episodes), Tales of Wells Fargo (seven episodes),Maverick (four episodes), Cheyenne (four episodes), Wagon Train (three episodes), Daniel Boone (three episodes), The Virginian (two episodes), The Rifleman, Bonanza, and in episodes of Lawman, Bat Masterson (sometimes in a recurring role as former Confederate soldier Soda Smith), The Restless Gun, and many others. In 1959, Patterson appeared as a sodbuster in an uncredited role on Lawman ("The Young Toughs").

He made additional TV appearances, including in three episodes of The Twilight Zone as well as Perry Mason, Burke's Law, The Untouchables, Judd, for the Defense, My Three Sons, and in later years The Mod Squad, Love, American Style, and Highway Patrol.

== Green Acres ==
In 1963, Patterson first appeared in what became a recurring role as farmer Fred Ziffel on the CBS rural comedy Petticoat Junction. In 1965, CBS debuted another rural comedy, Green Acres. Both series were set in the mythical farming community of Hooterville, with characters from Petticoat Junction often also appearing in Green Acres, including Patterson's Fred Ziffel character. On Green Acres, Patterson earned his greatest fame. In 1965 and 1966—two of the years in which the two series ran concurrently—Patterson frequently appeared in both shows in the same week in prime time.

The association of Patterson's character with Arnold, the pet pig that Fred and his wife Doris treated as a son, ensured Patterson a place in television history. Arnold attended school and watched TV, and was a talented artist, piano player, and actor. He even "talked" (snorted, grunted, and squealed) in a language that everyone in Hooterville seemed to understand except Oliver Wendell Douglas (Green Acres co-star Eddie Albert).

According to westernclippings.com "Characters and Heavies" by Boyd Magers, "Ironically, by the time Patterson was doing Green Acres, he was in his late 70s and almost completely deaf, but the producers loved his portrayal so much they worked around his hearing impairment by having the dialogue coach lying on the floor out-of-shot tapping Hank's leg with a yardstick as a cue to speak his line."

== Personal life ==
Hank Patterson was married to Daisy Marguerite (Sheeler) Patterson, a Kentucky native four years younger than Hank whose parents were both of German ancestry. They are listed together in the U.S. Census for both 1930 and 1940 as residing in Los Angeles. In the 1940 census, Hank's occupation is listed as "Actor, Motion Picture Studio & Stage."

Patterson's great-grandfather, James Pearson, was an original settler of St. Clair County, Alabama, as was his mother's great-grandfather, Thomas Newton. His great-grandfather, Henry S. Patterson, moved to Blount County, Alabama, around 1857 from Murray County, Georgia. Between 1894 and 1897, the family left Alabama to live in Texas.

Hank Patterson died at age 86 on August 23, 1975 of bronchial pneumonia. He is buried in Forest Lawn Memorial Park in Hollywood. Daisy died, also at age 86, on February 2, 1979.

Patterson's great-niece is actress Téa Leoni.

== Selected filmography ==
- The Arizona Kid (1939) - Townsman (uncredited)
- Sabotage (1939) - Minor Role (uncredited)
- The Covered Trailer (1939) - Townsman (uncredited)
- Three Faces West (1940) - Pool Player (uncredited)
- Abilene Town (1946) - Doug Neil
- The Scarlet Horseman (1946) - Sen. Masters (uncredited)
- I Ring Doorbells (1946) - Mr. Bradley
- The El Paso Kid (1946) - Jeff Winters
- Conquest of Cheyenne (1946) - Rancher (uncredited)
- Wild Beauty (1946) - Ed (uncredited)
- Santa Fe Uprising (1946) - Deputy Jake
- Gallant Bess (1946) - Ranch Hand (uncredited)
- Bells of San Angelo (1947) - Deaf Bus Passenger
- Robin Hood of Texas (1947) - Taxicab Driver (uncredited)
- Springtime in the Sierras (1947) - Old-Timer
- Under Colorado Skies (1947) - Slim
- The Tender Years (1948) - Zeke (uncredited)
- Relentless (1948) - Bob Pliny (uncredited)
- Oklahoma Badlands (1948) - Postmaster Fred
- Panhandle (1948) - Old Timer (uncredited)
- Night Time in Nevada (1948) - Dancing Tramp
- The Denver Kid (1948) - Sergeant Cooper
- The Plunderers (1948) - Stage Manager (uncredited)
- Belle Starr's Daughter (1948) - Townsman (uncredited)
- Red Canyon (1949) - Osborne (uncredited)
- Outcasts of the Trail (1949) - Hank Barris - Station Agent (uncredited)
- The James Brothers of Missouri (1949, Serial) - Duffy [Ch. 4] / Duffy [11]
- The Cowboy and the Indians (1949) - Tom - Ranch Foreman
- Tell It to the Judge (1949) - Sleigh Driver (uncredited)
- Riders in the Sky (1949) - Luke - Stagecoach Driver
- Perfect Strangers (1950) - Witness in Montage (uncredited)
- Code of the Silver Sage (1950) - Sgt. Woods
- No Sad Songs for Me (1950) - Night Construction Workman (uncredited)
- Please Believe Me (1950) - Sam Smith (uncredited)
- The Gunfighter (1950) - Jake (uncredited)
- Desperadoes of the West (1950, Serial) - Hardrock Haggerty [Ch. 4, 5]
- The Return of Jesse James (1950) - Clay County Marshal
- Al Jennings of Oklahoma (1951) - Jeff (uncredited)
- Silver City Bonanza (1951) - Postman
- Don Daredevil Rides Again (1951, Serial) - Buck Bender
- Indian Uprising (1952) - Jake Wilson (uncredited)
- Rose of Cimarron (1952) - Hunter on Trail (uncredited)
- California Conquest (1952) - Sam Lawrence (uncredited)
- Woman They Almost Lynched (1953) - Townsman (uncredited)
- Canadian Mounties vs. Atomic Invaders (1953, Serial) - Jed Larson [Ch.2-5]
- Jack Slade (1953) - Old Tom (uncredited)
- Ride Clear of Diablo (1954) - Wagon Driver (uncredited)
- Southwest Passage (1954) - Barstow (uncredited)
- Many Rivers to Cross (1955) - Second Innkeeper (uncredited)
- Murder Is My Beat (1955) - Medical Examiner (uncredited)
- Tarantula! (1955) - Josh
- Last of the Desperados (1955) - Hank - Wagon Driver (uncredited)
- The Great Locomotive Chase (1956) - Turner - Friendly Jailer (uncredited)
- The Lone Ranger (1956) - Old Man Kimberley (uncredited)
- The First Traveling Saleslady (1956) - First Cowhand in Courtroom (uncredited)
- Strange Intruder (1956) - Knife Sharpener (uncredited)
- Julie (1956) - Ellis
- The Storm Rider (1957) - Tom Milstead
- Beginning of the End (1957) - Dave
- God Is My Partner (1957) - John Biddle (uncredited)
- Man of a Thousand Faces (1957) - Scotty, Stage Door Man (uncredited)
- Gunsight Ridge (1957) - George Clark (uncredited)
- The Amazing Colossal Man (1957) - Henry
- Escape from Red Rock (1957) - Sheriff Grover
- Day of the Badman (1958) - George Foley (uncredited)
- Attack of the Puppet People (1958) - Janitor
- The Restless Gun (1958) - as Jonah in Episode "A Pressing Engagement"
- The Restless Gun (1958) - as Milt in Episode "Sheriff Billy"
- Tombstone Territory (1058) - Episode "Desert Survival"
- Terror in a Texas Town (1958) - Brady (uncredited)
- Earth vs. the Spider (1958) - Hugo the Janitor
- The Saga of Hemp Brown (1958) - Gil Henry (uncredited)
- The Decks Ran Red (1958) - Mr. Moody
- Monster on the Campus (1958) - Townsend - Night Watchman (uncredited)
- Tales of Wells Fargo (1959 episode Lola Montez) - Larson
- No Name on the Bullet (1959) - Ed - Chess Player (uncredited)
- Lone Texan (1959) - Jack Stone (uncredited)
- Gunmen from Laredo (1959) - Stableman (uncredited)
- Gunfighters of Abilene (1960) - Andy Ferris (uncredited)
- The Absent-Minded Professor (1961) - Fisherman Spectator (uncredited)
- Tammy Tell Me True (1961) - Rural Character (uncredited)
- Straightaway (1961 episode "The Tin Caesar") – Parker
- The Virginian (1964 episode "Smile of a Dragon") - Old Man
- A Covenant with Death (1967) - Old Man (uncredited)

== Selected television appearances ==
Year	Title	Role	Notes
1952-1967	Death Valley Days	Various Roles	15 episodes
1956	Highway Patrol	Frank Handley	S1:E33, "Dead Patrolman"
1956-1957	Broken Arrow	Stagecoach Driver	2 episodes
1956-1961	Cheyenne	Various Roles	4 episodes
1957-1960	Tombstone Territory	Various Roles	3 episodes
1957-1962	Tales of Wells Fargo	Various Roles	7 episodes
1958	The Restless Gun	Jonah / Milt Hatten	2 episodes
1958	Perry Mason	Jack Gilly	S1:E38, "The Case of the Terrified Typist"
1958	Trackdown	Taverner (uncredited)	S2:E14, "Three-Legged Fox"
1958-1959	The Texan	Bartender / Webber	2 episodes
1958-1961	Bat Masterson	Prospector / Warren T. "Soda" Smith	3 episodes
1958-1961	Wagon Train	Various Roles	3 episodes
1958-1962	Have Gun - Will Travel	Various Roles	10 episodes
1959	U.S. Marshal	Sam Castro	S1:E14, "Gold Is Where You Find It"
1959	Mackenzie's Raiders	Old Man	Season 1, Episode 32: "Desertion"
1959	The Deputy	Luke Mason	Season 1, Episode 10: "The Big Four"
1959-1960	Riverboat	? / Johnny Mullins	2 episodes
1959-1960	Lawman	Sodbuster / Harrison Lester	2 episodes
1959-1960	Maverick	Various Roles	4 episodes
1959-1962	Laramie	Stagecoach Driver / Sundown	2 episodes
1959-1973	Gunsmoke	Various Roles	35 episodes
1960	Overland Trail	Old Timer in Stagecoach Station	Season 1, Episode 5: "Westbound Stage"
1960	Bonanza	Blacksmith	Season 2, Episode 5: "The Hopefuls"
1960	Outlaws	Davy	Season 1, Episode 6: "Last Chance"
1960	The Westerner	Sample	Season 1, Episode 10: "Line Camp"
1960-1961	Zane Grey Theatre	Slim Baker / Jonas Mulvey	2 episodes
1960-1961	Rawhide	Dan Simmons / Simpson	2 episodes
1960-1962	The Tall Man	? / Amos	2 episodes
1960-1962	The Untouchables	Various Roles	3 episodes
1962	The Rifleman	Abe Merar	Season 4, Episode 23: "The Debt"
1962	My Three Sons	Quinby Lewis	S2:E35, "Hippopotamus' Foot"
1962-1964	The Twilight Zone	Freitag / Mr. Gentry / Old Man	3 episodes
1963	Empire	Old Man Hughes	S1:E29, "65 Miles Is a Long, Long Way"
1963-1966	Petticoat Junction	Fred Ziffel	11 episodes
1964	Burke's Law	Lukey Slade	S2:E8, "Who Killed Lenore Wingfield?"
1964-1967	The Virginian	Old Man / Patient	2 episodes
1965	The Andy Griffith Show	Hobo	S5:E22, "If I Had a Quarter Million Dollars"
1965	The Loner	Bartender	S1:E9, "The Sheriff of Fetterman's Crossing"
1965	A Man Called Shenandoah	Godey	Season 1, Episode 11: "The Reward"
1965	The Wild Wild West	Porter Richards	S1:E12, "The Night of the Human Trigger"
1965-1968	Daniel Boone	Various Roles	3 episodes
1965-1971	Green Acres	Fred Ziffel	84 episodes
1966	The Legend of Jesse James	Porter	Season 1, Episode 24: "Benjamin Bates"
1966	Laredo	The Station Master	S1:E25, "A Very Small Assignment"
1967	Cimarron Strip	Old Will	S1:E6, "The Battle of Bloody Stones"
1967	The Guns of Will Sonnett	Stableman	Season 1, Episode 9: "First Love"
1967	Custer	Trapper	Season 1, Episode 17: "Pursued"
1968	Judd, for the Defense	Pearson	S1:E19, "No Law Against Murder"
1969	The Beverly Hillbillies	Fred Ziffel	S7:E15, "Drysdale and Friend"
1969	The Mod Squad	Phil	S1:E18, "A Hint of Darkness, a Hint of Light"
