= June Kenney =

American actress (1933–2021)

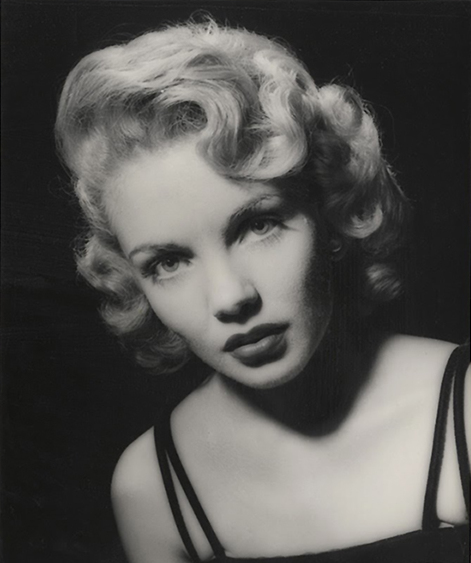
- Kenney in 1957
- Born: June Claire Kenney; July 6, 1933; Boston, Massachusetts, U.S.
- Died: June 25, 2021 (aged 87); Pahrump, Nevada, U.S.
- Occupation: Actress
- Years active: 1954–1962
- Spouse: Lee A. Sebastian (m. 1970; died 1998)

June Claire Sebastian (née Kenney; July 6, 1933 – June 25, 2021) was an American actress known for her work in B movies in the late 1950s.

== Early life ==
June Claire Kenney was born in Boston, Massachusetts, the only child of Frederick Kenney, a builder and plumber of Irish descent, and Edna (née Deslauriers), a homemaker of French-Canadian descent. She lived in suburban Malden, Massachusetts during her childhood.

Kenney started singing and dancing when she was four. Her appearances on Boston area radio attracted the attention of talent scouts looking for the next Shirley Temple. She signed with Warner Bros. and appeared in several musical shorts. The studio wanted to send her to Hollywood, but her father did not let her go as he wanted to keep the family together and not abandon his construction business. Ultimately her parents decided to move west to escape the cold New England winters. The Kenneys relocated to Southern California around 1949, first to Gardena, California, before settling in West Hollywood.

== Career ==
As a teenager Kenney appeared in stage plays and studied at the Meglin School of Dance. She attended Hollywood Professional School in the morning and worked afternoons at Grauman's Chinese Theatre as an usherette. Walter Kohner spotted her during a performance and signed her to his brother Paul's talent agency.

Kenney was on the verge of receiving her break into television when she was cast opposite Robert Hutton and Adele Mara in the television soap opera My Sister and I in 1954, but the show's sponsor pulled out before it went to production. Instead she received her first television credits for supporting roles in episodes of The Loretta Young Show and Public Defender. That year, she received her first credited film role for the religious short City Story.

Through the rest of the 1950s, Kenney played bit parts and supporting roles on television in Fireside Theater, TV's Reader's Digest, Whirlybirds and The Millionaire. She was featured in commercials for Coppertone and Vaseline, and did voiceover work for Austin-Healey.

An interview with Roger Corman got Kenney her above-title billing when he gave her the lead role of Barbara Bonney, a good girl accused of murdering a jealous rival, in his 1957 film noir Teenage Doll. Impressed with her performance, Corman gave her work in two other pictures that year. Kenney played Tina in Sorority Girl, in which a manipulative sorority sister (Susan Cabot) pressures her into blackmailing a lover. Kenney was also given the role of Asmild, the good-hearted but naive sister of the leader of a band of Viking women in The Saga of the Viking Women and Their Voyage to the Waters of the Great Sea Serpent. She originally had not been considered for the part, but was brought in after production began when Abby Dalton's sister suffered a concussion from falling off a horse and Corman needed a blonde to replace her.

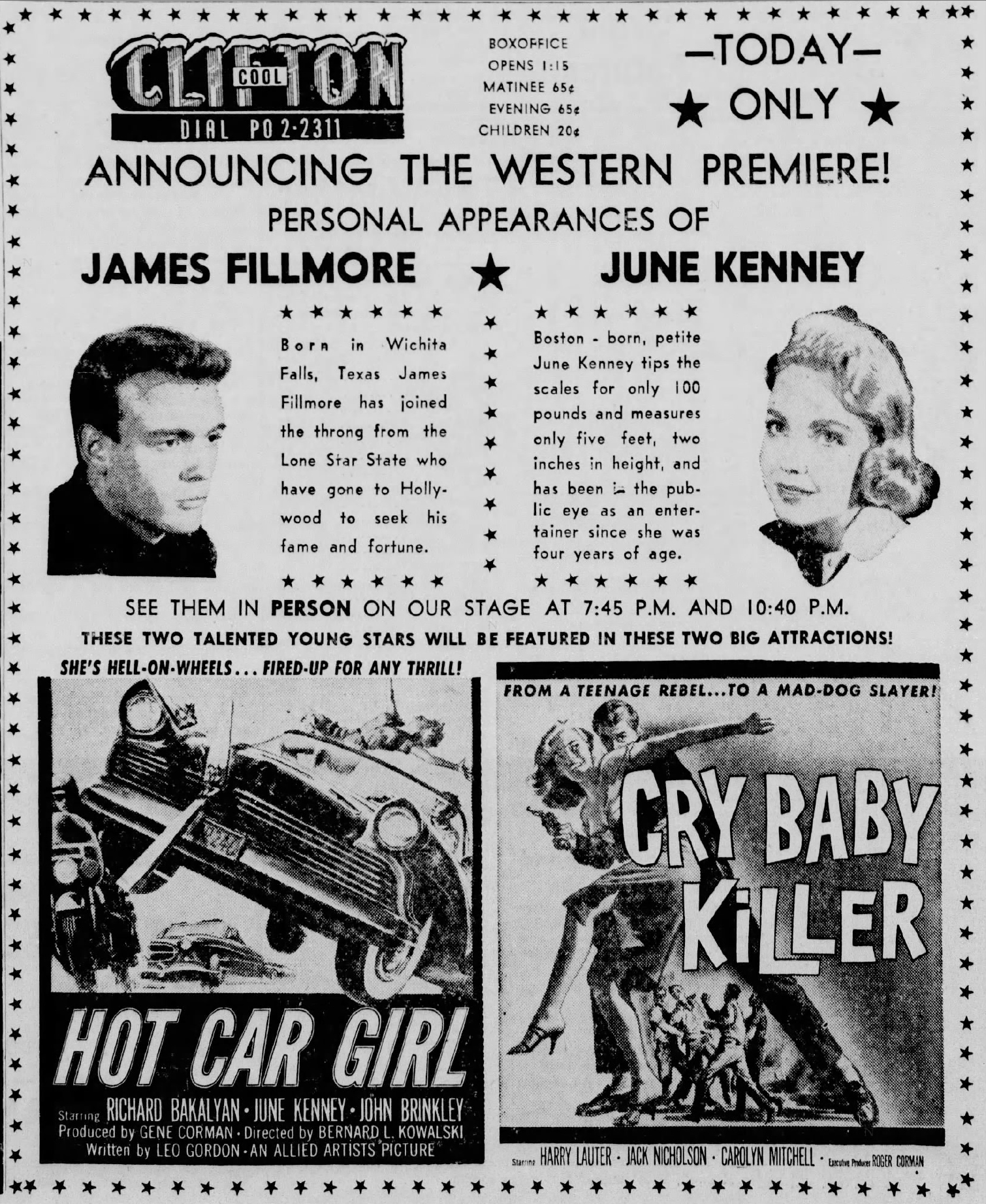
Advertisement for "Hot Car Girl" and "Cry Baby Killer" double feature with live appearances by June Kenney and James Fillmore at the Clifton Theater in Lubbock, Texas on June 6, 1958.

In 1958, Kenney starred opposite Dick Bakalyan in the teen exploitation feature Hot Car Girl, produced by Roger's brother Gene Corman and directed by Bernard L. Kowalski. The film was distributed in Texas on a double bill with Cry Baby Killer through a series of four wall engagements. Promotion included Kenney touring the state with Texas-born James Fillmore, a supporting actor in Cry Baby Killer. Kenney sang and Fillmore played piano in live stage performances between showings of their respective films.

That year Bert I. Gordon cast Kenney as female lead in two horror films: Attack of the Puppet People and Earth vs. the Spider.

The late 1950s saw major changes in the movie industry as the growing popularity of television reduced audiences for A pictures. Large studios took note of the success of smaller B movie studios like American International Pictures and Allied Artists and began producing their own low-budget films aimed at the teenage and drive-in markets. As a result, Kenney found herself facing stiff competition for movie roles. She mentioned this to Bill McReynolds of the Amarillo Globe-Times in 1958:

"Today the movie studios are using more and more young talent. About all a young actress can do is hope that she'll click and be able to go on to more and better things."

Kenney longed to expand her acting range, but a lack of opportunities made her take the role of Betty Scott in Bloodlust! in 1959 in order to stay active in movies. Critics panned the film upon its release in 1961. Kenney later said she accepted the part "almost as a favor" to Ralph Brooke, the film's director, despite her desire to move beyond "screaming" roles. She recalled that she and her co-stars (Robert Reed, Gene Persson and Joan Lora) felt out of place in the film, and the experience led her to question the direction her career had taken.

A casting call landed Kenney an uncredited role in Jerry Lewis's 1961 film The Ladies Man, her only appearance in an "A" movie. She attributed winning the part to Lewis's appreciation of her ability to walk down stairs in rhythm to music. Her final feature film appearance was in The Cat Burglar, another Gene Corman production, released in 1961. Her last television roles were in a 1961 episode of Bonanza ("The Infernal Machine") as wife of inventor Daniel Pettibone. A bit part in an episode of Thriller, as a co-star with James Franciscus, James Philbrook, and Mary Murphy in the short-lived 1961 CBS crime adventure-drama series The Investigators, and in a supporting role in an episode of The Tall Man in 1962.

Kenney later reflected on how her break into movies ultimately affected her acting career:

"Roger Corman got me started but once you become under contract to someone like Roger, you are labeled a 'B' movie player. I learned the inner workings from Roger like camera shots and the on the set production process and so on...but when you're typecast into 'B' pictures, it's hard to grow out of it. When you go on an interview and your past credits are reviewed and all they see is 'teenage' this and 'monster' that, it's a turn-off...they do consider your past credits and those sort of pictures don't help the situation."

Kenney retired from acting in 1962. Around that time she took a job handling commercials for Los Angeles radio station KLAC. Feeling discouraged from the lack of call backs and interviews and unhappy with the roles she was being offered at the time, she later said she "thought it would be best to bow out gracefully."

== Screen persona and image ==
In films Kenney typically plays the good girl who falls in with the wrong crowd or finds herself in situations beyond her control. Standing five feet, two inches tall, she was often described as "tiny" and "petite." Her height and youthful appearance helped make her convincing in teenage roles such as Barbara Bonney in Teenage Doll and Carol Flynn in Earth vs. the Spider. She admitted she wished she were taller even though her stature helped her land her a lead role in Attack of the Puppet People.

Kenney furnished her own clothes for several of her film roles. A friend from her dance school custom made the dress she wore in Attack of the Puppet People.

Syndicated beauty columnist Lydia Lane praised Kenney's fitness. Kenney credited exercises she learned in ballet and continued to perform daily during her acting career.

Kenney's co-stars appreciated her good nature and strong work ethic. Jay Sayer, who worked with her in Teenage Doll and Viking Women, recalled:

She was about as un-Hollywood as you can get...And just very sweet, very easy to work with, and a nice girl. You'd never guess she was an actress.

== Personal life and death ==
Kenney married Lee Sebastian in Los Angeles in 1970. The couple later moved to Las Vegas where they managed a horse ranch. She continued working in radio and was inducted into the Nevada Broadcasters Association Hall of Fame in 1997. Kenney died in Pahrump, Nevada on June 25, 2021, at the age of 87.

== Selected filmography ==
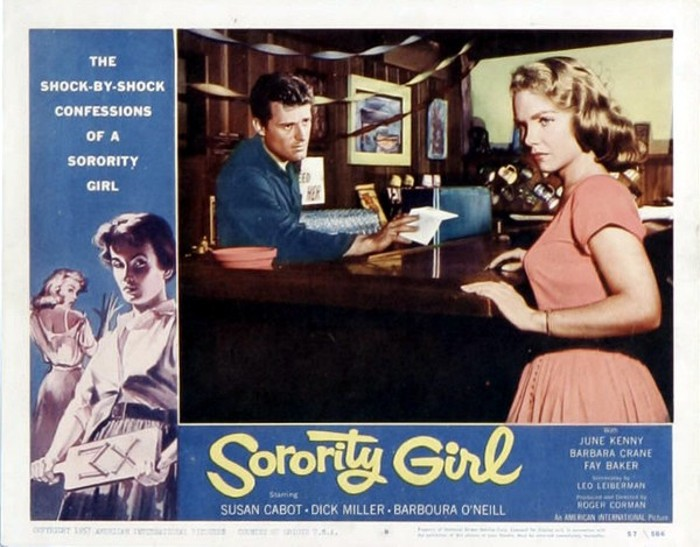
Sorority Girl lobby card, 1957

Selected filmography:

- City Story (1954)
- Teenage Doll (1957)
- Sorority Girl (1957)
- The Saga of the Viking Women and Their Voyage to the Waters of the Great Sea Serpent (1957)
- Attack of the Puppet People (1958)
- Earth vs. the Spider (1958)
- Hot Car Girl (1958)
- The Ladies Man (1961)
- Bloodlust! (1961)
- The Cat Burglar (1961)

== Sources ==
- "The Spider is Bigger Than a House!". American Press. American International Pictures. 1958.
- Di Salvo, Anthony; Fetters, Jim; Parla, Paul (January 2010). "Our Living Teenage Doll: An Exclusive Interview with June Kenney". Scary Monsters Magazine. No. 73.
- "History of the American Cinema: The Film Industry in the 1950s". Encyclopedia.com.
- Hughes, Betty (1958-06-06). "Diet-Less Miss Kenney: All That Dessert – And No Problem!". Abilene Reporter-News. p. 17.
- Lane, Lydia (1958-01-07). "Beauty Care: Ballet Star Tells of Leg Exercises". Philadelphia Inquirer. p. 13.
- Lane, Lydia (1958-01-10). "Hollywood Beauty: Exercise for Trim Legs, Advises Petite June Kenney". Abilene Reporter-News. p. 7.
- Lane, Lydia (1962-01-20). "She's Hip on How to Whittle Weight". Los Angeles Times. p. 31.
- McReynolds, Bill (1958-06-05). "Entertainment Capers". Amarillo Globe-Times. p. 32.
- "Hall of Fame Inductees for 1997". Nevada Broadcasters Association.
- O'Dowd, John (2011-03-31). "Sally Todd Interview: Page 4".
- O'Dowd, John (2011-03-31). "Sally Todd Interview: Page 5".
- "Play Piano, Sing: Young Movie Stars Appear on Stage". Abilene Reporter-News. 1958-06-06. p. 34.
- Silver, Alain; Ursini, James (2006). Roger Corman: Metaphysics on a Shoestring. Silman-James Press. ISBN 978-1-8795-0542-1.
- "Sister Soap Opera Leads Set; Gunning in May". Variety. 1954-05-05. p. 37.
- Weaver, Tom (2004). Science Fiction and Fantasy Flashbacks: Conversations with 24 Actors, Writers, Producers and Directors from the Golden Age. McFarland. ISBN 978-0-7864-0564-0.
- Weaver, Tom (2014). I Talked with a Zombie: Interviews with 23 Veterans of Horror and Sci-Fi Films and Television. McFarland. ISBN 978-0-7864-9571-9.
