= Robert Tetrick =

American film and television actor

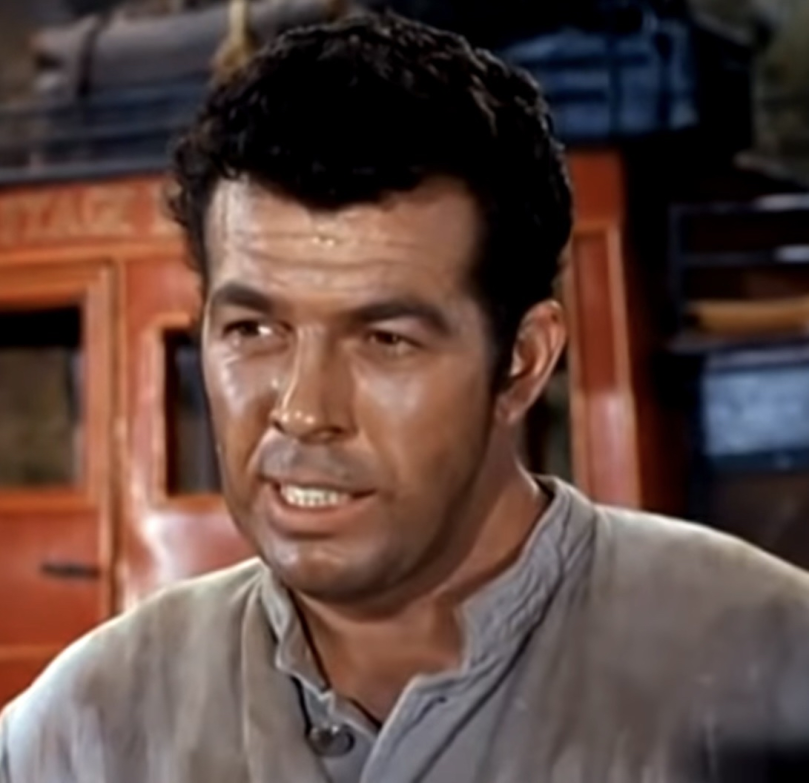
- Tetrick in Bonanza, 1960
- Born: Robert Edward Tetrick; February 12, 1927; San Diego, California, U.S.
- Died: March 13, 1996 (aged 69); Norco, California, U.S.
- Occupations: Film and television actor

Robert Edward Tetrick (February 12, 1927 – March 13, 1996) was an American film and television actor. He was known for playing Private Bill in the 1958 film Suicide Battalion.

== Life and career ==
Tetrick was born in San Diego, California, the son of Edward Tetrick and Winnefred Ziegler. He began his screen career in 1958, appearing in the syndicated crime drama television series State Trooper. The next year, he appeared in the television programs Sky King, Man Without a Gun, Harbor Command and Tombstone Territory, and made his film debut, starring as Private Bill in the film Suicide Battalion, starring along with Mike Connors, John Ashley, Russ Bender, Bing Russell and Walter Maslow.

Later in his career, Tetrick guest-starred in television programs including Bonanza, Rawhide, Tales of Wells Fargo, The Life and Legend of Wyatt Earp, Trackdown, Cimarron City and Bat Masterson, and also in films such as Earth vs. the Spider, War of the Colossal Beast and Noose for a Gunman.

Tetrick retired from acting in 1962, last appearing in the film Walk with the Damned.

== Death ==
Tetrick died on March 13, 1996, in Norco, California, at the age of 69.
