= Beginning of the End (film) =

1957 science fiction film directed by Bert I. Gordon

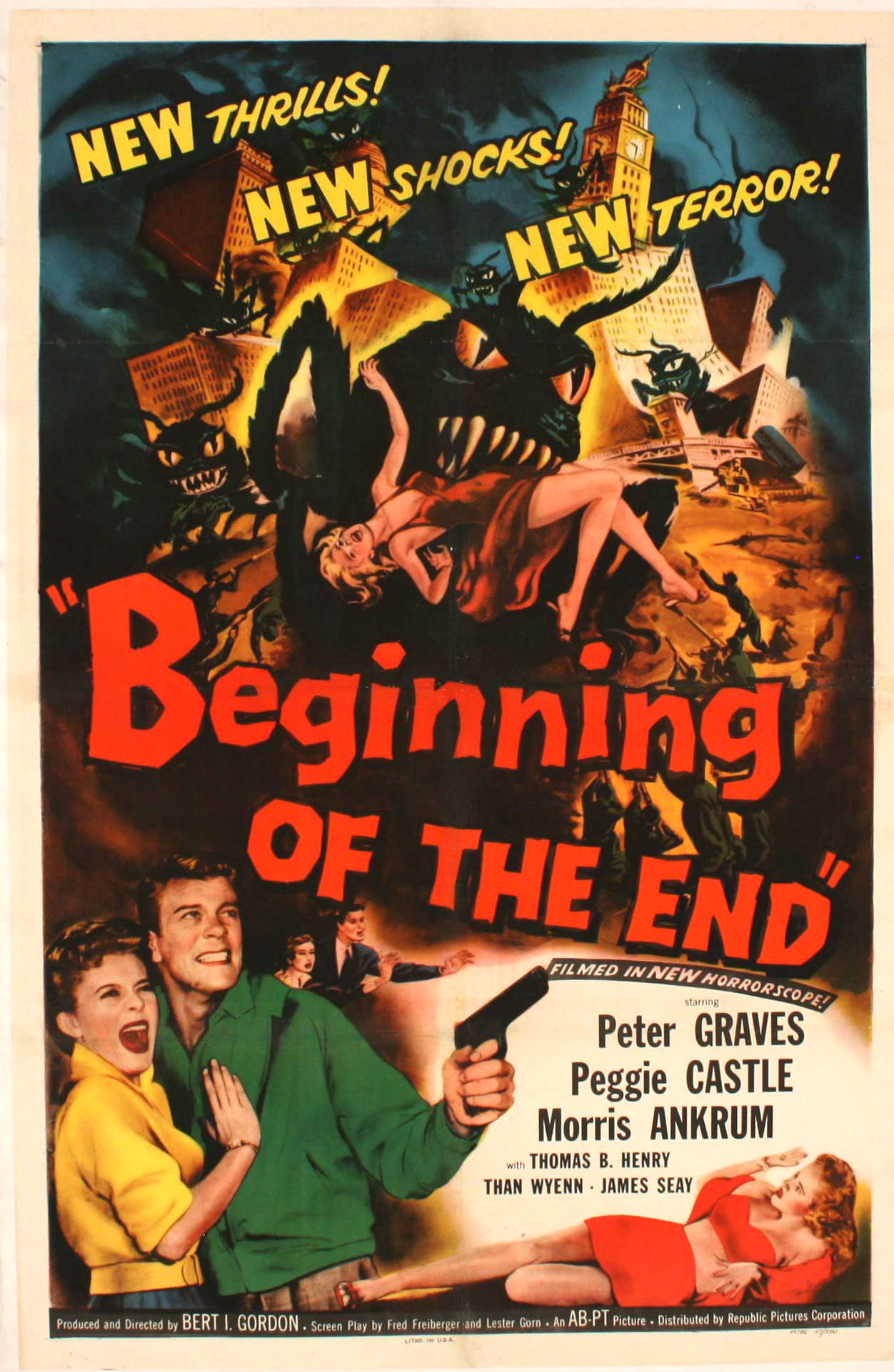
- Theatrical release poster
- Directed by: Bert I. Gordon
- Written by: Fred Freiberger; Lester Gorn
- Produced by: Bert I. Gordon
- Starring: Peter Graves; Peggie Castle; Morris Ankrum; Thomas Browne Henry; Than Wyenn; James Seay
- Cinematography: Jack A. Marta
- Edited by: Aaron Stell
- Music by: Albert Glasser
- Production company: AB-PT Pictures
- Distributed by: Republic Pictures
- Release date: June 16, 1957 (US)
- Running time: 73-74 minutes
- Country: United States
- Language: English
- Budget: $170,000
- Box office: $290,000

Beginning of the End is a 1957 American science fiction film produced and directed by Bert I. Gordon. It stars Peter Graves, Peggie Castle, and Morris Ankrum. Dr. Ed Wainwright, an agricultural scientist, played by Graves, successfully grows gigantic vegetables using radiation. Unfortunately, the vegetables are eaten by locusts (the swarming phase of short-horned grasshoppers), which quickly grow to a gigantic size and attack the nearby city of Chicago. Beginning of the End is generally known for its "atrocious" special effects, "and yet," writes reviewer Bill Warren, "there is something almost compellingly watchable about this goofy little movie".

Beginning of the End is the most popular film at the Insect Fear Film Festival at University of Illinois Urbana-Champaign, according to the National Wildlife Federation's magazine in 1995.

The film was released on June 16, 1957, and played on a double feature with The Unearthly (1957).

== Plot ==
The film opens with newspaper photojournalist Audrey Aimes accidentally stumbling upon a small town (Ludlow, Illinois) which has been inexplicably destroyed. All 150 residents are missing, and the evidence indicates they are dead. Incredibly, the local fields are also barren, as if a swarm of locusts had eaten all the crops. Aimes suspects that the military is covering something up, and travels to a nearby United States Department of Agriculture experimental farm to learn what creature might have caused the agricultural destruction. She meets Dr. Ed Wainwright, who is experimenting with radiation as a means of growing gigantic fruits and vegetables to end world hunger. Wainwright reports that there have been a number of mysterious incidents nearby, and that locusts have eaten all the radioactive wheat stored in a nearby grain silo.

Gigantic mutant locusts rampage over the countryside. Wainwright and Aimes begin to track down the source of the mysterious occurrences, and quickly discover that the locusts which ate the grain have grown to the size of a city bus. The monsters have eaten all the crops in the area, and now have turned to human beings as a source of sustenance. It is also clear that they are headed for Chicago. Wainwright and Aimes meet with General John Hanson, Colonel Sturgeon, and Captain James Barton to try to come up with a solution. Machine gun and artillery fire seem ineffective against the creatures, and there are far too many to effectively deal with all at once. The United States Army and Illinois National Guard are called upon to help protect the city. However, the monsters quickly invade Chicago, and begin to feast on human flesh, as well as several buildings.

General Hanson concludes that the only way to destroy the beasts en masse is to use a nuclear weapon and destroy Chicago. However, Wainwright realizes that the locusts are warm-weather creatures. He concludes that he might be able to lure the locusts into Lake Michigan using a decoy locust mating call, generated electronically with test-tone oscillators. There, the cold water will incapacitate them, and they will drown. The plan works at the last possible moment. The monstrous locusts drown, but Wainwright and Aimes wonder if other insects or animals might have eaten other radioactive crops.

== Cast ==
- Peter Graves as Dr. Ed Wainwright
- Peggie Castle as Audrey Aimes
- Morris Ankrum as General John Hanson
- Than Wyenn as Frank Johnson
- Thomas Browne Henry as Colonel Sturgeon
- Richard Benedict as Corporal Mathias
- James Seay as Captain James Barton
- John Close as Major Everett
- Don Harvey as Lab Guard
- Larry Blake as Patrolman
- Eilene Janssen as Necking Teenager
- Hylton Socher as Frank
- Frank Wilcox as General John T. Short
- Douglas Evans as Norman Taggart
- Lyle Latell as Lieutenant MacKenzie
- Hank Patterson as Dave
- Rayford Barnes as Chuck
- Patricia Dean as Red Cross Representative
- James Douglas as Sentry
- Joseph Cranston as Soldier

== Production ==
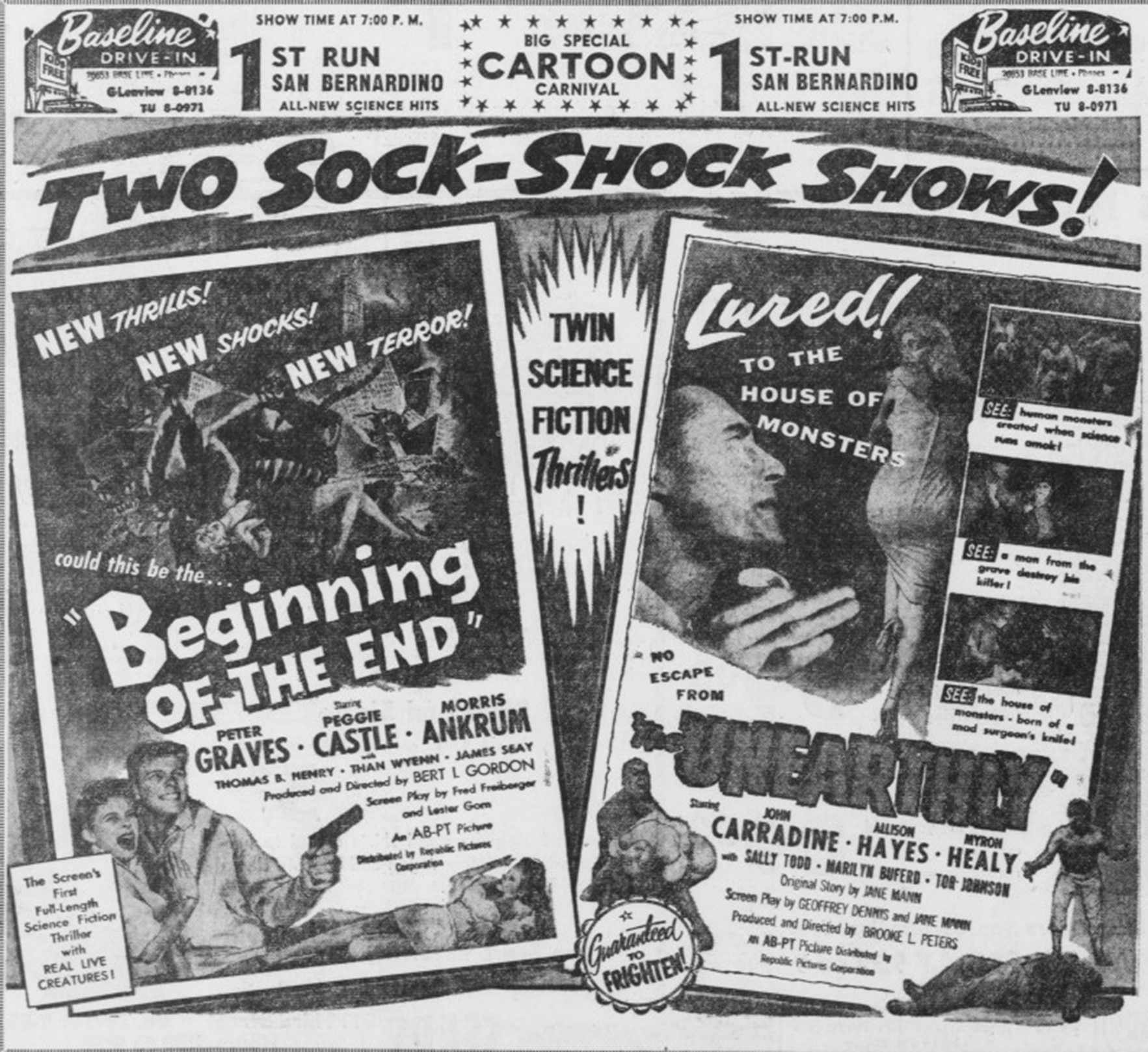
Drive-in advertisement from 1957 for Beginning of the End and co-feature, The Unearthly.

Beginning of the End was financed by American Broadcasting-Paramount Theatres (AB-PT). The company had been formed in February 1953 when the American Broadcasting Company and United Paramount Theatres merged. In September 1956, AB-PT (sometimes also called "Am-Par") announced the formation of a movie studio, and revealed a slate of six films a year in January 1957. The studio's focus was on low-budget features which it could place in its theatres in the Northeast and South. AB-PT hoped to expand to a yearly slate of 20 pictures, and signed a distribution deal with Republic Pictures to get them into theatres.

Beginning of the End went into production in 1956, the first of the "boom years" for science fiction films in the United States. Its production was a direct outcome of the success of Them!

AB-PT announced on November 29, 1956, that it had approved production of its first film, Beginning of the End and announced on December 2, 1956, that production would begin immediately. The company said it had hired 34-year-old Bert I. Gordon to direct and produce. Gordon had gotten his start as a supervising producer for televised commercials and network TV shows, had produced his first feature film (Serpent Island) in 1954, and directed his first feature film (King Dinosaur) in 1955.

The story was already set, according to press reports, with Variety claiming that Bert I. Gordon had already completed the script. Press sources noted that the studio was clearly attempting to cash-in on the science fiction movie craze. However, the final screenplay is credited to Fred Freiberger (a veteran writer of B movies) and Lester Gorn. The screen story bears a striking resemblance to the 1904 H. G. Wells novel The Food of the Gods and How It Came to Earth (Gordon would adapt this novel twice, once for Embassy Pictures in 1965's Village of the Giants and again for American International Pictures in 1976's The Food of the Gods).

Casting was complete within two weeks of the start of production. In late November, AB-PT said actress Mala Powers was being considered for the female lead. But on December 2, the studio revealed that Peter Graves and Peggie Castle had been cast as the leads. Three days later, AB-PT announced that Don C. Harvey, Morris Ankrum, Pierre Watkin, Ralph Sanford, and Richard Benedict had also been cast. The studio also said that Pat Dean, its "sexboat" discovery (and a former dancer at the El Rancho Vegas hotel and casino in Las Vegas, Nevada) would also appear in the picture. Larry Blake, Duane Cress, James Douglas, Eilene Jannsen, Joseph Cranston, Ann Loos, and Jeanne Wood were added to the cast a few days later, though Cress, Loos and Wood do not appear in the final film. Ankrum, Thomas Browne Henry, and James Seay were cast because they usually played military men in B movies, roles they portrayed in Beginning of the End as well.

John A. Marta, a veteran cinematographer, and Aaron Stell, a long-time film editor, also worked on the film. Marta had shot close to 150 B movies for Republic Pictures by this time, which is probably why he was hired (given AB-PT's relationship with that studio and Marta's fast-and-quick shooting style). Albert Glasser composed the musical score. Glasser worked in the same office building where Gordon had his offices, and Gordon admired his score for the 1956 war film Huk! (a B movie from Pan Pacific Productions). Gordon had already used Glasser to score his 1957 monster movie The Cyclops. Glasser wrote the musical score for Beginning of the End as well as five more of Gordon's films. Glasser was paid $4,000 for his work on The Cyclops, which may indicate how much he was paid for the musical score for Beginning of the End. The musical soundtrack included the song "Natural, Natural Baby" by Lou Bartel and Harriet Kane. The art director was Walter Keller.

It is not clear what the budget for the picture was, although descriptions often use the term "low budget" or "ultra-low-budget." According to a statement by AB-PT President Leonard Goldenson in 1957, the average cost of the AB-PT pictures greenlit to date was $300,000. In comparison, Invaders From Mars was budgeted at $150,000, The Beast From 20,000 Fathoms cost $400,000, It Came From Outer Space cost $532,000, Them! came in at under $1 million, and 1953's The War of the Worlds cost $2 million.

Filming began December 3, 1956. Shooting took place on the Republic Pictures backlot at 4024 Radford Avenue in Los Angeles, California (built by Mack Sennett and now home to CBS Studio Center). Actor Peter Graves said Gordon "was okay, he was a good director." He also had praise for actress Peggie Castle, and said he felt privileged to be working with an actor of Morris Ankrum's stature.

Gordon himself provided the special effects for the film. According to composer Glasser, Gordon literally worked out of his home garage. Animated grasshoppers were considered, but the idea rejected as too costly. So Gordon relied heavily on split screen, static mattes, and rear projection effects for the film. But his most important effort was one he had used in King Dinosaur: placing live creatures on still photographs, and blowing air at them to encourage the creatures to move. Gordon purchased 200 non-hopping, non-flying live grasshoppers in Texas (which had recently seen an outbreak of a species of exceptionally large locusts) for the film. But when he attempted to bring them into California for filming, state agricultural officials required that every single one of the animals be inspected and sexed. He later described his efforts:

I had to get my grasshoppers from Waco, Texas. They had the only species large enough to carry focus. I could only import males because they didn't want the things to start breeding. They even had someone from the agricultural department or some place like that come out to take a head count, or wing count. The grasshoppers turned cannibalistic.

Gordon kept the grasshoppers in a box for only a few days, but during that time the grasshoppers devoured one another and only 12 were left when Gordon finally got around to shooting them. Gordon also considered building miniatures for the grasshoppers to climb on, but this, too, was deemed too expensive. Instead, Gordon used still photographs of the Wrigley Building and other noted Chicago landmarks and simply filmed the grasshoppers moving about on top of the photograph. When the monsters are supposed to be wounded or killed by gunfire, Gordon merely tipped the photograph and the grasshoppers slid down it. According to one film historian, "the effect looks (almost) real" until one of the grasshoppers steps off the "building" into what is supposed to be thin air.

== Release ==
Beginning of the End premiered in Chicago on June 16, 1957. Stars Peter Graves and Peggie Castle were both on hand for the premiere. The film opened widely in 244 theaters in the South and Midwest on June 28, 1957. It played as part of a double feature with The Unearthly. As planned, it was distributed by Republic Pictures.

There is some discrepancy as to how long the film ran. Some sources cite 73 minutes, some 74 minutes, and some 76 minutes.

Beginning of the End proved an apt title for its parent studio. AB-PT shuttered its operations immediately after releasing the film, for reasons which are still unclear. Gordon's work for AB-PT landed him a new contract with American International Pictures (AIP). The week Beginning of the End opened, Gordon began shooting his next feature film, The Amazing Colossal Man, for AIP.

== Reception and legacy ==
Beginning of the End was a modest hit, and profitable for AB-PT. For example, in its first week playing in San Francisco, it made $16,000—just behind the top-ranked movie of the week for the area, the reissue of Bambi (which grossed $18,500). The film's debut in Los Angeles saw its gross reach $16,500, although this was a soft movie-going market.

The film made Bert I. Gordon famous for his giant monster films. Critics and film historians point out that the film is only one of many which drew heavily on most Americans' fear about atomic weapons, open-air nuclear tests, and the possibility of nuclear war. However, Beginning of the End had very little of the metaphorical creativity of films such as Godzilla or Them! A more recent assessment, however, concludes that the film taps more deeply into 1950s Americans' worries over invasive species and growing unease over pesticides (like DDT).

The film received extensive negative reviews at the time of its release and by modern film historians. Variety was particularly negative. Calling the movie "derivative", the industry trade publication said, "Summarizing the plot of Beginning of the End is like rehashing the story of several dozen similar films." The publication felt that not much effort had been put into the film. "Even taken on its own terms—as a low-budget exploitation feature—Beginning of the End hardly reflects the best effort of a major theatre circuit." It called the special effects "obvious" and decried the use of stock footage. The reviewer felt the screenplay was "ludicrous" and cliché-ridden. The magazine believed Peter Graves had turned in a decent performance, but described Peggie Castle's performance as "unconvincing" and Morris Ankrum's as "artificial". The cinematography and editing were, it concluded, average. Mae Tinnee, reviewing the motion picture for the Chicago Tribune had several negative comments. "The film obviously was made on a shoestring budget, and the people in it are no more than props for the magnified insects. I doubt if it will fool anyone. But youngsters will probably think it's great stuff." The Los Angeles Times was far harsher in its assessment. Its unsigned review concluded: "The audience is cheated in the production. The conclusion is never in doubt and the process shots are so obvious that one is startled the first time a buffalo-sized grasshopper hits the screen but never again. And at no time are there more than a half-dozen of the things shown at once, although the script avers that there are thousands about and more coming." As of 2008, Beginning of the End is still "one of the most excoriated creature features." Leonard Maltin summed up his review in one word: "awful". Another recent film guide called it "Bottom-of-the-sci-fi-barrel rubbish, very boring to watch." One review pointed out that Gordon didn't even bother to hide the mountains in the background of the shots (Central Illinois is mostly flat prairie land). Some have also been upset with film's lack of horrifying images. The derivative nature of the picture has also upset some critics. Critics say the film covered almost the same ground as the far superior monster movie Them!, and it is clear that Gordon merely wanted to "cash in" on giant bug craze rather than come up with a story that was fresh and creative.

There have been some positive reviews, however. One modern critic said "the story is adequately paced, the acting is engaging, and we still get a thrill seeing the Army guys empty their cartridges at the unstoppable insects." Another modern reviewer found the screenplay effective, especially the beginning: "As in Deadly Mantis, the complete disappearance of the victims is especially chilling, as is the notion of 150 men, women and children being devoured overnight while in their beds. This aspect is like something out of Lovecraft, although it is not exploited as well as it could have been." Producer-director Bert I. Gordon said he did not care whether reviews were bad; what mattered was whether people went to see the film: "The movie audience these days consists almost entirely of teenagers. Either they're naïve and go to get scared, or they're sophisticated and enjoy scoffing at the pictures. There isn't much a teenager can scoff at these days, you know." Lead actor Peter Graves also felt the film worked on a certain level. "I think they played OK. ... All of that was ludicrous, but there were a certain amount of people who 'bought' it and loved it."

Beginning of the End has become somewhat infamous because of its notoriously poor production values and unrealistic plot. The movie was parodied in the 11th season of the hit animated television program The Simpsons in the 1999 episode "E-I-E-I-(Annoyed Grunt)." In that episode, Homer Simpson (voiced by Dan Castellaneta) grows giant vegetables using radioactive materials, and automatically assumes that any animal eating the food will become monstrous. Homer even attempts to recall Beginning of the End as evidence of his claim, although he misremembers the title as Grasshopperus and the star as Chad Everett (another blond, all-American actor similar to Peter Graves). The film was the basis of an episode of the satirical cable television show Mystery Science Theater 3000 (MST3K) during its fifth season. This episode of MST3K was released on DVD in 2001.

== Home media ==
Beginning of the End was released on DVD in March 2003 by Image Entertainment. However, this print was considered "smeary" and not a very high quality issue.
