= Earth vs. the Spider =

1958 film by Bert I. Gordon

- Theatrical release poster by Albert Kallis
- Directed by: Bert I. Gordon
- Written by: László Görög; George Worthing Yates
- Produced by: Bert I. Gordon
- Starring: Ed Kemmer; June Kenney; Eugene Persson
- Cinematography: Jack A. Marta
- Edited by: Walter E. Keller
- Music by: Albert Glasser
- Distributed by: American International Pictures
- Release date: October 31, 1958
- Running time: 73 minutes
- Country: United States
- Language: English
- Budget: $146,000

Original theatrical trailer

Earth vs. the Spider (a.k.a. The Spider) is an independently made 1958 American black-and-white horror film produced and directed for Santa Rosa Productions by Bert I. Gordon, who also provided the plot upon which the screenplay by George Worthing Yates and Laszlo Gorog was based. Though the title suggests a global crisis, the film focuses entirely on a small town being terrorized by a giant spider.

The film stars Ed Kemmer, June Kenney and Eugene Persson. The special effects were by Bert I. Gordon, Flora M. Gordon, Thol Simonson and Paul Blaisdell. Earth vs. the Spider was released in Los Angeles on October 31, 1958, by American International Pictures and played as a double feature in different film markets with either The Brain Eaters, The Screaming Skull or Terror from the Year 5000. Walter Keller and Bill Calvert were Set designers, Albert Glasser did the music, and Marty Moss and John W. Rogers were assistant directors on the film.

== Plot ==
Jack Flynn is driving down a highway at night looking at a bracelet he bought his teenage daughter, Carol, for her birthday, when his pickup truck hits a massive silk thread stretched across the road. The next morning, Carol is concerned that her ne'er-do-well dad did not come home the night before. She convinces her boyfriend, Mike Simpson, to assist in a search. They find his crashed truck and the bracelet. Thinking he may have taken shelter in a nearby cave, they investigate. In the darkness of the cave, they step off a ledge and fall onto the web of an enormous tarantula, which emerges to attack them. They escape and make it back to town.

Sheriff Cagle does not believe Carol and Mike about the giant spider, but their science teacher, Art Kingman, persuades him to return to the cave with large amounts of DDT. They find Jack's body, drained of fluids, and spray DDT throughout the cave to flush out and then kill the spider. The apparently lifeless body of the spider is taken back to town to the high school gym, where Kingman wants to study it, concerned that whatever conditions created it may produce a whole race of giant spiders. A group of teenagers uses the gym to practice rock and roll numbers they are going to play for a school dance. The music awakens the spider, and it breaks out through the wall of the gym. The janitor, Hugo, stopping to phone for help, is killed. The spider terrorizes the town, killing more people before heading to Kingman's house and attacking his wife, Helen, and their son. Kingman, in his car, gets the spider's attention and lures it outside of town before returning to check that Helen and his son are safe.

The spider is spotted returning to its cave. Cagle and Kingman use dynamite to seal the spider in, but then discover Carol and Mike had gone into the cave to retrieve the bracelet Jack had bought her as a final memento of him. A crew is put to work digging into the cave through its ceiling. Kingman gets two large electrodes from the local power company and runs cables to connect to power lines. Trying to escape the spider's reach, Carol and Mike proceed onto a narrow ledge, which collapses behind them, leaving them trapped. The spider descends on a strand of web to get at them. The townspeople arrive and throw one of the electrodes to Mike. Kingman and Mike use the electrodes to electrocute the spider, which falls, impaling itself on stalagmites. Dynamite is again used to seal off the cave, and Cagle remarks with satisfaction that even should the spider return to life, it will be trapped and starve to death. However, Kingman fears that curious scientists may again dig up the spider in hopes of studying it.

== Cast ==
- Ed Kemmer as Art Kingman
- June Kenney as Carol Flynn
- Gene Persson as Mike Simpson
- Gene Roth as Sheriff Cagle
- Hal Torey as Mr. Simpson
- June Jocelyn as Mrs. Flynn
- Mickey Finn as Sam Haskel
- Sally Fraser as Helen Kingman
- Troy Patterson as Joe
- Skip Young as Sam
- Howard Wright as Jake
- Bill Giorgio as Deputy Sheriff Sanders
- Hank Patterson as Hugo
- Jack Kosslyn as Mr. Fraser
- Bob Garnet as pest control man
- Shirley Falls as switchboard operator
- Robert Tetrick as Deputy Sheriff Dave
- Nancy Kilgas as dancer
- George Stanley as cavern man
- David Tomack as foreman
- Merritt Stone as Jack Flynn
- Dick D'Agostin as pianist

== Production ==
Lobby card under the alternate title The Spider

The film's original on-screen title was Earth vs. the Spider, but when The Fly (also released in 1958) became a blockbuster, the title was shortened to just The Spider on all of the advertising material. The original screen title, however, was never changed, so the film is frequently referred to by the title Earth vs. the Spider.

The movie theater in which Mike Simpson (Gene Persson) works displays a film poster prominently advertising The Amazing Colossal Man, while the marquee shows that it is currently running Attack of the Puppet People, which happens to also star Ed Kenney. Both of these films were also directed by Bert I. Gordon. Attack of the Puppet People was the last film Gordon made for American International Pictures (AIP) for a number of years, with the director claiming that the studio had not paid him appropriately. However, he returned to AIP in the 1970s.

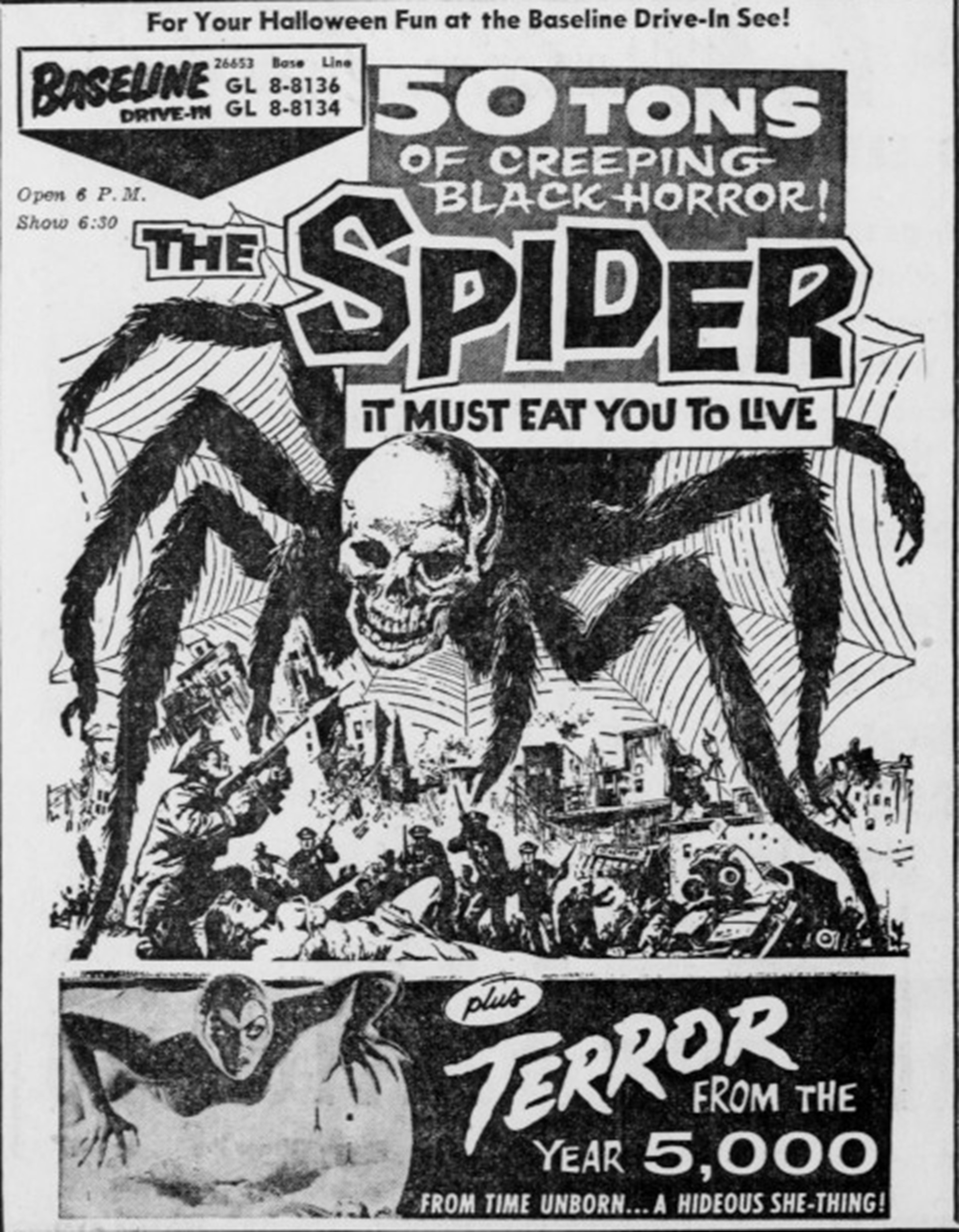
Drive-in advertisement from 1958 for Earth vs. the Spider with co-feature Terror from the Year 5000

Some of the cave interiors were filmed using stills from Carlsbad Caverns National Park in New Mexico, with live action scenes filmed at Bronson Caves in Griffith Park near Los Angeles. Special effects expert Paul Blaisdell created a life-size giant spider leg to use in the film, as well as a desiccated, mummy-like corpse that was used to represent the spider's victims in several scenes. The same dummy was used to film both the dead truck driver Jack Flynn (Merritt Stone) from the beginning of the film as well as Deputy Sheriff Dave (Bob Tetrick); all that was required was a change of clothes on the mannequin. The film's budget was $146,000.

== Release ==
The film had AIP's biggest launch at the time, opening in 400 theaters at midnight on Halloween in 1958, on a double bill with Terror from the Year 5000.

== Reception ==
Critical response for Earth vs. the Spider has been mixed. Bruce Eder from AllMovie gave the film a positive review, calling it "the most consistently entertaining, if not the best of Bert I. Gordon's various size-oriented fantasy-sci-fi films", but noting that the film's special effects were dated. Writing in DVD Talk, critic Glenn Erickson reported that although the film "[o]ccasionally [...] seems to exist in a different dimension," it "works better than most Bert I. Gordon pix because we basically like the teenaged heroes, even though they're so badly directed that it's hard to believe anything they do," further adding that the film's "non-sequiturs are sheer joy for creature feature fans." Critic Gary Tooze described the film as "weak, even by the genre's low standards, but it does have appeal with its one dimensional characters and limited plot points."

== In popular culture ==
Earth vs. the Spider was featured in the third season of the movie-mocking television show Mystery Science Theater 3000 as episode #313.

In 2001, producer and special effects artist Stan Winston, remade the film as part of his Creature Features series.

A short clip of the film can be seen on one of the television sets in the 2002 Disney film Lilo & Stitch.

The film was shown on the MeTV show Svengoolie on December 25, 2021, and again on New Year's Eve 2022. It will be shown again on May 30, 2026.

== See also ==
- Tarantula (film)
