= Bloodlust! =

1961 film

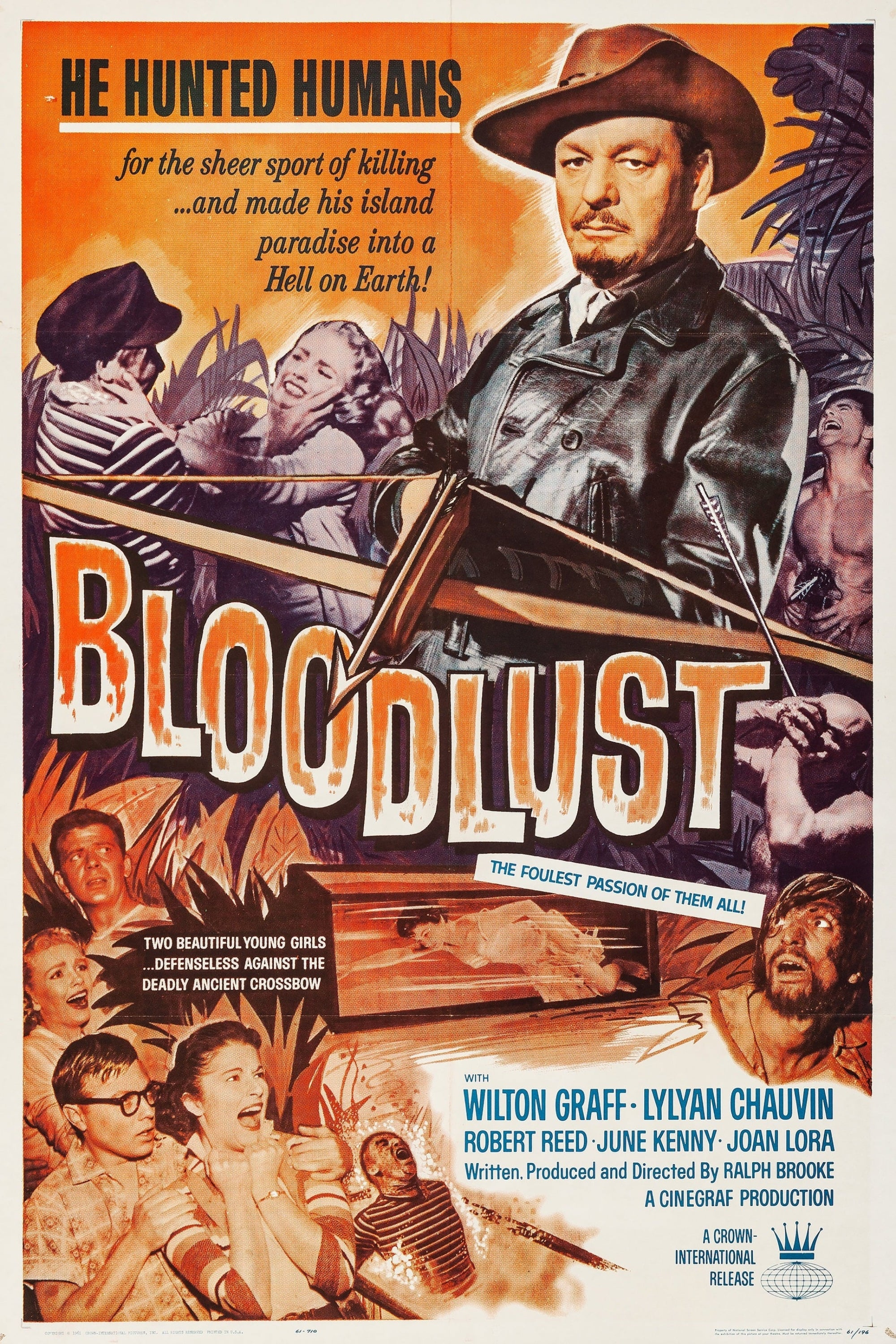
- Theatrical release poster
- Directed by: Ralph Brooke
- Written by: Richard Connell; Ralph Brooke
- Produced by: Robert H. Bagley; Ralph Brooke
- Starring: Wilton Graff; Robert Reed; June Kenney; Gene Persson
- Cinematography: Richard E. Cunha
- Edited by: Harold V. McKenzie
- Music by: Michael Terr
- Distributed by: Crown International Pictures
- Release date: September 13, 1961
- Running time: 68 minutes
- Country: United States
- Language: English

Bloodlust! (1961) by Ralph Brooke

Bloodlust! is a 1961 American horror thriller film written, directed and produced by Ralph Brooke and starring Wilton Graff, June Kenney, Joan Lora, Eugene Persson, and Robert Reed. It is based without attribution on Richard Connell's 1924 short story "The Most Dangerous Game." It was produced by Robert H. Bagley. Its plot follows four young adults who visit a tropical island only to become prey for a sadistic hunter. It was filmed in 1959 but not released until 1961, when it was the second film on a double feature with The Devil's Hand.

== Plot ==
Two couples - Betty and Johnny, and Jeanne and Pete - vacation at sea together. When the ship's captain passes out drunk, they decide to go to a nearby jungle island. As they depart, Capt. Tony awakens and calls out, warning them not to.

As they explore the island, Johnny falls into a pit. While pulling him out, the others look up to see Dr. Balleau and two servants. Balleau orders the servants to help get Johnny out.

That night at his house, Balleau tells them he moved to the island "after the war" to indulge his passion for hunting. The couples want to leave, but Balleau says they cannot because wild animals prowl the jungle. Balleau makes his wife Sandra show Betty and Jeanne to the guestroom, while his servant Jondor escorts Johnny and Pete to their room.

Lovers Sandra and houseguest Dean Gerard later discuss Dean's latest plan for their escape. Meanwhile, Johnny and Pete go to Betty and Jeanne's room. The four decide to poke about the house. Sandra and Dean stop Betty and Johnny, taking them back to the guestroom. Jeanne and Pete find a tunnel. They go in and discover a vat of bubbling acid. They are horrified to find a woman's body floating in an aquarium. Jeanne and Pete go back to the guestroom to tell the others what they have seen.

Dean tells them his escape plan: he and Sandra will slip out of the house, steal a boat, go to the mainland and come back with help. As they sneak through the front gate, Balleau, toting a spear, follows.

Two days later, no one has seen Balleau or heard from Sandra and Dean. While hiding, Betty and Johnny discover a secret door. Through it they find Balleau and his "trophies"- the mounted bodies of people he has hunted, Sandra and Dean among them. Balleau used to be a sniper during the war. At first, he detested sniping but then began to enjoy it, and soon the enjoyment "turned into a lust - a lust for blood!"

As Balleau tells both couples that he will hunt Johnny and Pete, Jondor comes in dragging Capt. Tony. Balleau adds Tony to the hunt for failing to bring sufficient inmates from the "penal island." Balleau will hunt only the three men. He will carry a crossbow and only three arrows, one for each man.

Jondor locks the girls in the guestroom. To make things more "sporting", he tosses Tony a pistol and says they will find ammunition in the "Tree of Death." There, they find just one bullet. Tony runs off with it, leaving Johnny and Pete to fend for themselves. When Tony attempts to shoot Balleau, the gun does not fire. Balleau, who has removed the firing pin, kills Tony.

After escaping from the guestroom, Betty and Jeanne enter the secret tunnel. They go into the room with a vat of acid looking for weapons when a servant comes in. He and Betty tussle. Betty, the daughter of a judo expert, throws the servant into the acid, where he dissolves and dies.

The girls head into the jungle. While hunting the men, Jondor falls into a leech-filled pond. Balleau leaves him to drown. Betty and Jeanne find Johnny and Pete. They head for Balleau's house, planning to use his rifles against him. After finding rifles but no ammunition, they are defenseless.

Balleau finds the couples hiding in his trophy room. Holding them at gunpoint, he poses them in the tableau they will be in after dying. Jondor then bursts in, covered with leeches. Jondor grabs Balleau and impales him on a row of spikes, killing him.

== Cast ==
- Wilton Graff as Dr. Albert Balleau
- June Kenney as Betty Scott (credited as June Kenny)
- Walter Brooke as Dean Gerard
- Robert Reed as Johnny Randall
- Eugene Persson as Pete Garwood (credited as Gene Persson)
- Joan Lora as Jeanne Perry
- Troy Patterson as Capt. Tony
- Lilyan Chauvin as Sandra Balleau
- Bobby Hall as Jondor
- Bill Coontz as insane man in the jungle and servant
- Harry Wilson as a trophy (uncredited)

== Production ==
Bloodlust! is an uncredited adaptation of Richard Connell's short story "The Most Dangerous Game", first published in Collier's magazine in 1924. Versions of the story have been made as theatrical films, shorts, and made-for-television movies at least 17 times between 1932 and 2016.

Bloodlust! was filmed in 1959 at Screencraft Studios in Hollywood by Cinegraf Productions, but it was not released by Crown International Pictures until 13 September 1961, when it premiered in San Diego, California, on a double bill with The Devil's Hand. The film was distributed by Astral Films in Canada in 1963 and was also released in Mexico and the Soviet Union, although at unspecified dates.

Lilyan Chauvin's first name is misspelled "Lylyan" on both American and Mexican posters and lobby cards for the film. She and Graff share top billing on them despite her minor role in the movie.

== Reception ==
Critical reception of the movie was poor. In a review of its co-feature, The Devil's Hand, film critic Margaret Harford wrote just one succinct paragraph about Bloodlust!: "Wilton Graff, another veteran actor turned to villainy, plays a mad scientist in the companion feature. The title is 'Blood Lust.' which should be sufficient warning for anyone."

The anonymous reviewer in "Feature Reviews" in BoxOffice magazine's issue of 20 November 1961 had more to say, writing that "little, if anything, is left to the individual viewer's imagination" in Bloodlust! and that star Graff "doesn't bring much conviction to the killer doctor part," while "the four young people ... emerge as one-dimensional actors." In summary, the reviewer said, "... this seems to let emotion-mad humans go on all out on a killing spree, and while the adventure-action audiences will find what's happening relatively engrossing, the discriminating won't be able to contain their bored feelings."

In a short review, British film critic Phil Hardy dismissed Bloodlust! as "a wretched misuse of the Richard Connell story" and called the Dr. Balleau character a "dismal pervert pursuing teenagers whose bodies he stores in glass tanks."

Bloodlust! could be mistaken for the similarly-titled Blood Lust, one of multiple English language titles of the 1977 West German film Moskito der Schänder (literally, Mosquito the Rapist). It and the 1970 American movie Blood Mania shared a "combo" poster of both movies that was used to promote a drive-in theatre double-feature. Both films carried R-ratings in the U. S., which required people under age 17 to be accompanied by a parent or an adult guardian.

== Television ==
Bloodlust! was sold to TV in October 1963, about two years after its theatrical release, by Westhamtpon Features, a division of Desilu. It was part of a 41-film package which also included The Devil's Hand.

More recently, it was shown on Mystery Science Theater 3000 on 3 September 1994, in an episode which featured the first appearance of character Pearl Forrester as well as violin playing by Maria Bamford. On 9 January 2009 it was featured on The Schlocky Horror Picture Show and on 8 October 2010 was shown in "The Screaming Skull" episode of Cinemassacre's Monster Madness.

== Home media ==
Bloodlust! has been in home release for a number of years and by at least 22 different distributors, as a single film or in sets of films. Madacy Entertainment was the first, putting the movie out on VHS and DVD in 2001. Reel Media Entertainment had a VHS tape in world-wide release in 2004, followed by Film Annex's world-wide release in all media formats in 2006. BAC Films distributed a DVD of the movie in France in 2006 and Elstree Entertainment released Bloodlust! on DVD in the U. K. in 2001.

== See also ==
- List of American films of 1961
- Taxidermy
