= The Tall Target =

1951 film by Anthony Mann

- Theatrical release poster
- Directed by: Anthony Mann
- Screenplay by: George Worthing Yates; Art Cohn
- Story by: George Worthing Yates; Daniel Mainwaring (as Geoffrey Homes)
- Produced by: Richard Goldstone
- Starring: Dick Powell; Paula Raymond; Adolphe Menjou
- Cinematography: Paul C. Vogel
- Edited by: Newell P. Kimlin
- Production company: Metro-Goldwyn-Mayer
- Distributed by: Metro-Goldwyn-Mayer
- Release dates: August 22, 1951 (Los Angeles); September 27, 1951 (New York)
- Running time: 78 minutes
- Country: United States
- Language: English
- Budget: $966,000
- Box office: $620,000

The Tall Target is a 1951 American historical crime Western film directed by Anthony Mann and starring Dick Powell, Paula Raymond and Adolphe Menjou. Powell stars as a police sergeant who tries to stop the assassination of Abraham Lincoln at a train stop as Lincoln travels to his inauguration. It is based on the alleged Baltimore Plot.

The film's sets were designed by the art directors Eddie Imazu and Cedric Gibbons.

The film has no conventional score. Famed composer Bronislau Kaper worked on the film, without receiving onscreen credit, but only orchestrated two period songs which appear as source music: Battle Hymn of the Republic and Rally Round the Flag.

== Plot ==
New York police sergeant John Kennedy, who had guarded Abraham Lincoln on the campaign trail, has infiltrated a cabal and discovered that an assassination attempt has been planned as Lincoln, the president-elect, travels by train to Washington, D.C. Kennedy's boss Simon G. Stroud dismisses the threat, as does Caleb Jeffers, a militia colonel with whom Stroud is meeting. Kennedy resigns and resolves to foil the conspirators on his own. Having already sent a copy of his report to the Secretary of War, he sends a telegram to Lincoln, urgently requesting a meeting in Baltimore.

On February 22, 1861, Kennedy boards the train bound for Washington, where Inspector Reilly is to give him his train ticket. However, Kennedy cannot find Reilly and is forced to disembark. As the train departs, Kennedy sprints after it and sneaks aboard. Among the other passengers are anti-slavery writer Charlotte Alsop and Lance Beaufort, a West Point cadet who plans to resign and enlist in the Confederate army. Beaufort is accompanied by his sister Ginny and their slave Rachel.

Kennedy discovers Reilly's body on the exterior platform of a train car, but the corpse slips from the train as he is reaching for it. When Kennedy returns to his berth, he finds an imposter claiming to be him and in possession of his ticket. A passenger named Caleb Jeffers vouches for Kennedy and gives him a spare ticket to share his compartment.

The imposter forces Kennedy to leave the train at gunpoint at the next stop, planning to kill him when the train whistle sounds. Kennedy fights with him and the commotion attracts Jeffers, who shoots and kills the imposter. However, Kennedy is uncertain for whom the bullet was intended. Jeffers steals the derringer that he had lent to Kennedy and shoots him. The bullet does not injure Kennedy, who had tampered with it. Jeffers confesses that he is involved the plot in order to protect his shares in Northern cotton mills that would be adversely affected by war.

At the Philadelphia stop, Kennedy tries to have Jeffers arrested, but is arrested himself. Rachel unsuccessfully tries to deliver an urgent message to Kennedy, who escapes and reboards the train. The conductor is ordered to hold the train until a special package is delivered. A passenger named Mrs. Gibbons takes her ailing husband aboard.

Kennedy encounters Rachel, who informs him that Beaufort is disembarking in Baltimore, not Atlanta as he had claimed. Kennedy is taken prisoner by Beaufort and bound in Jeffers' compartment. The plotters are disappointed to learn that Lincoln has canceled his speech in Baltimore, where Beaufort was to assassinate him.

Jeffers detrains, but as the train is departing, he remembers Mrs. Gibbons and surmises that her husband is actually Lincoln in disguise. Running after the train, he alerts Beaufort. Kennedy frees himself and, in the ensuing struggle, sends Beaufort tumbling from the speeding train.

Mrs. Gibbons tells Kennedy that she is an undercover Pinkerton agent and that his report to the War Department was read by Allan Pinkerton, who persuaded Lincoln to cancel his speech and travel incognito as the ailing Mr. Gibbons. As the train reaches Washington, Lincoln muses, "Did ever any president come to his inauguration so like a thief in the night?"

== Cast ==
- Dick Powell as John Kennedy
- Paula Raymond as Ginny Beaufort
- Adolphe Menjou as Colonel Caleb Jeffers
- Marshall Thompson as Lance Beaufort
- Ruby Dee as Rachel
- Richard Rober as Lieutenant Coulter
- Leif Erickson as Stranger
- Will Geer as Homer Crowley
- Florence Bates as Mrs. Charlotte Alsop
- Tom Powers as Simon G. Stroud
- Katherine Warren as Mrs. Gibbons
- Regis Toomey as Insp. Tim Reilly
- Victor Kilian as John K. Gannon - Flyer Express Engineer
- James Harrison as Allan Pinkerton
- Percy Helton as Beamish - Passenger in Club Car (uncredited)
- Barbara Billingsley as Young Mother on Train (uncredited)

== Reception ==
In a contemporary review for The New York Times, critic Bosley Crowther called the film a "moth-eaten melodrama" and wrote: "[T]he yarn is so preposterous and Mr. Powell is so cussedly smug in the role of a New York detective who tips Mr. Lincoln off that illusions become somewhat scrambled and it all seems the work of Mr. Powell. ... After clattering through the night in tedious fashion ... the tall target finally gets to Washington and Mr. Lincoln—in case you're wondering—does not get shot. We wouldn't be able to tell you about the people who made this film."

Critic Philip K. Scheuer of the Los Angeles Times wrote: "Alfred Hitchcock used most of the conceivable devices possible to a train thriller in 'The Lady Vanishes,' so 'The Tall Target' can hardly be blamed for having to use some of them again. Under Anthony Mann's shrewd and victoriously exciting direction the journey is good fun all the way, even though there are actually too many villains to make good sense. And the atmosphere of 90 years ago gives it all an extra fascination."

According to MGM records, the film earned $473,000 in the U.S. and Canada and $147,000 elsewhere, resulting in a loss of $608,000.
