= George Worthing Yates =

American screenwriter

George Worthing Yates (14 August 1901 in New York City – 6 June 1975 in Sonoma) was an American screenwriter and author. His early work was on serials shown in cinemas; he later progressed to feature films, primarily science fiction. He was the nephew of the head of Republic Pictures, Herbert Yates.

== Filmography ==
Screenwriter (unless noted otherwise)

- The Lone Ranger (1938) serial
- The Mysterious Miss X (1939) (story)
- Hi-Yo Silver (1940)
- Man From Frisco (1944) (story)
- The Falcon in Mexico (1944)
- The Spanish Main (1945)
- Sinbad the Sailor (1947) (story)
- The Tall Target (1951)
- The Last Outpost (1951)
- This Woman Is Dangerous (1952)
- Those Redheads From Seattle (1953)
- China Venture (1953)
- Them! (1954) (story)
- Conquest of Space (1955)
- It Came from Beneath the Sea (1955)
- Earth vs. the Flying Saucers (1956)
- The Amazing Colossal Man (1957)
- Attack of the Puppet People (1958)
- Earth vs. the Spider (1958)
- The Flame Barrier (1958)
- Frankenstein 1970 (1958)
- Space Master X-7 (1958)
- War of the Colossal Beast (1958)
- Tormented (1960)
- King Kong vs. Godzilla (1962)
