= The Cat Burglar =

1961 film by William Witney

- Film poster
- Directed by: William Witney (as William N. Witney)
- Written by: Leo Gordon
- Produced by: Gene Corman
- Starring: Jack Hogan; June Kenney; John Baer
- Cinematography: Taylor Byars
- Edited by: Morton Tubor
- Music by: Buddy Bregman
- Color process: Black and white
- Production company: Harvard Film
- Distributed by: United Artists
- Release date: July 1961
- Running time: 65 minutes
- Country: United States
- Language: English

The Cat Burglar is a 1961 American neo-noir crime film written by actor Leo Gordon and directed by William Witney. It starred Jack Hogan, June Kenney and John Baer.

== Plot ==
A small-time crook steals a briefcase full of plans belonging to enemy agents.

== Cast ==
- Jack Hogan as Jack Coley
- June Kenney as Nan Baker
- John Baer as Alan Sheridan
- Gregg Palmer as Reed Taylor
- Will J. White as Leo Joseph (as Will White)
- Gene Roth as Pete
- Bruno VeSota as Muskie
- Billie Bird as Mrs. Prattle
- Tommy Ivo as Willie Prattle

== See also ==
- List of American films of 1961
- Cat burglar
