= Albert Glasser =

American musician (1916-1998)

- Born: January 25, 1916; Chicago, Illinois, U.S.
- Died: May 4, 1998 (aged 82); Los Angeles, California, U.S.
- Occupations: Composer, conductor, arranger
- Years active: 1941–1988

Albert Glasser (January 25, 1916 – May 4, 1998) was a composer, conductor and arranger of film music, primarily in the realm of B-movies during the 1940s, 1950s, and 1960s. He scored approximately 200 films during his career, many for American International Pictures and director Bert I. Gordon. For the US War Department, Glasser composed for Frank Capra's Special Services Unit and for Office of War Information radio shows for overseas broadcasts. For television, he composed the score for the early western, The Cisco Kid. For radio, he composed scores for Hopalong Cassidy, Clyde Beatty, and Tarzan. Glasser joined ASCAP in 1950, and his popular song compositions include "Urubu", "The Cisco Kid", "Someday" and "I Remember Your Love". In addition to his composition work, Glasser was an amateur radio operator (K6RFU).

== Selected filmography ==
- In This Corner (1948)
- The Cobra Strikes (1948)
- Last of the Wild Horses (1948)
- Treasure of Monte Cristo (1949)
- Secrets of Beauty (1951)
- Geisha Girl (1952)
- Invasion U.S.A. (1952)
- The Neanderthal Man (1953)
- Paris Model (1953)
- Dragon's Gold (1954)
- The Boss (1956)
- Flight to Hong Kong (1956)
- The Big Caper (1957)
- Monster from Green Hell (1957)
- Beginning of the End (1957)
- Viking Women and the Sea Serpent (1957)
- The Cyclops (1957)
- Valerie (1957)
- The Hired Gun (1957)
- The Amazing Colossal Man (1957)
- War of the Colossal Beast (1958)
- Giant from the Unknown (1958)
- Teenage Caveman (1958)
- Earth vs. the Spider (1958)
- High School Confidential (1958)
- Night of the Quarter Moon (1959)
- The Boy and the Pirates (1960)
- Confessions of an Opium Eater (1962)
- The Cremators (1972)
- The Naked Monster (2005)
