= The Investigators (1961 TV series) =

1961 American television series

- Genre: Crime drama
- Directed by: Joseph H. Lewis
- Starring: James Franciscus; James Philbrook; Mary Murphy; Al Austin; Asher Dann; June Kenney
- Theme music composer: Jack Marshall
- Composer: Pete Rugolo
- Country of origin: United States
- Original language: English
- No. of seasons: 1
- No. of episodes: 13

Production
- Executive producer: Richard Irving
- Producer: Michael Garrison
- Running time: 60 minutes
- Production companies: Revue Studios; MCA TV

Original release
- Network: CBS
- Release: October 5 – December 28, 1961

The Investigators is an American drama television series starring James Franciscus and James Philbrook about a team of insurance investigators in New York City. Original episodes aired from October 5 to December 28, 1961, on CBS.

== Synopsis ==
The show follows investigators Russ Andrews, Steve Banks, and Bill Davis who all work for Investigators Inc, a successful private investigation firm in Manhattan who is hired by many large insurance companies to root out insurance fraud. Maggie Peters is mainly the office's girl Friday, but occasionally will go undercover to serve as an investigator herself. The team becomes more involved with criminals, the police, and others, as they investigate the legitimacy of the various insurance claims.

== Cast ==
- James Franciscus....Russ Andrews
- James Philbrook....Steve Banks
- Mary Murphy....Maggie Peters
- Al Austin....Bill Davis
- Asher Dann....Danny Clayton
- June Kenny....Polly Walters

== Broadcast history ==
The Investigators premiered on CBS on October 5, 1961, airing on Thursdays at 9:00 p.m. throughout its 13-episode run. CBS cancelled it after only half a season. Its last original episode aired on December 28, 1961.

== Episodes ==
No.	Title	Directed by	Written by	Original release date
1	"Murder on Order"	Joseph H. Lewis	Unknown	October 5, 1961
A series of supposed accidental death cases leads to the glamorous Madame Lucia Vaillancour, the owner of a swank dance studio — and she does not suspect that her latest student is insurance investigator Russ Andrews. Rhonda Fleming, Brad Dexter, and June Dayton guest-star.
2	"The Oracle"	Unknown	Unknown	October 12, 1961
An insurance company hires Investigators Inc. to investigate a leader who calls himself "Nostradamus" and convinces the rich women who are his followers to cash in their insurance policies and give him the money. The company wishes to stop its client, Constance Moreno, from making the same mistake and giving him $250,000. Russ, Maggie, and Danny travel to Los Angeles to protect Constance from fraud and investigate the cult. "Nostradamus," it turns out, is a drifter and con man named Walter Mimms who has a talent for getting the women he meets to fall in love with them, but also has a weakness — he tends to fall in love with them as well. Walter himself is being manipulated by an older con man, Joseph Lombard, who is using Walter as a front for his own, bigger fraudulent schemes. Constance has fallen in love with Walter, but Russ and Maggie visit her and convince her to test Walter′s love before giving him her $250,000 check. At Lombard's orders, Walter fails Constance′s test and she keeps her check. Soon Lombard′s men visit her to get the check and murder her to prevent her from causing any more problems. They throw her from her apartment′s window, and Lombard tells Walter she jumped from the window to commit suicide because of his rejection of her. After Constance′s death, Walter becomes less and less stable, and Maggie goes undercover to impersonate Walter′s next mark, discovering that Walter uses a phony séance to trick his victims. Lee Marvin, Audrey Dalton, and John Williams guest-star.
3	"New Sound for the Blues"	Joseph H. Lewis	Unknown	October 19, 1961
Kitty Harper is a nightclub pianist/singer whose athlete son is accidentally killed by Anderson in the lobby of the insurance firm's office building. As the facts emerge, she is faced with unwelcome revelations regarding her late son's alleged crimes. Claire Trevor–with songs dubbed by Jo Ann Greer–and Bill Williams guest-star.
4	"I Thee Kill"	Joseph H. Lewis	Unknown	October 26, 1961
A man named Jack Daley's ex-girlfriend Sheila Beaumont is about to marry someone else, and he insists on joining the crowd outside the church for a last look at her. Mickey Rooney, Claire Griswold, Richard Rust, Bill Zuckert, and Raymond Bailey guest-star.
5	"Quite a Woman"	Joseph H. Lewis	Unknown	November 2, 1961
A former silent film star hires Investigators Inc. to settle a claim for the theft of her valuable art collection. Soon after taking the case, however, Andrews begins to wonder if the paintings were really stolen. Miriam Hopkins, Otto Kruger, Abraham Sofaer, and Alan Mowbray guest-star.
6	"Style of Living"	Unknown	Unknown	November 9, 1961
A wealthy woman, Valerie Corbin, is concerned about her husband's safety. He is a heavy gambler, and his life could be in danger. Bethel Leslie, Dina Merrill, Gavin MacLeod, and Ed Binns guest-star.
7	"In a Mirror, Darkly"	Unknown	Unknown	November 16, 1961
When a female fashion designer reports the loss of her exclusive fall line in a fire, the investigators get an anonymous tip which touches off an inquiry into her activities. Miriam Hopkins, Joanna Barnes, Diana Lynn, and Harry Townes guest-star.
8	"A Man of Means"	Unknown	Unknown	November 23, 1961
Alternative title "De Luca." Steve Banks finds romantic complications when he investigates a fire in a cannery community. Robert Middleton, Vito Scotti, Mario Alcalde, and Judi Meredith guest-star.
9	"Death Leaves a Tip"	Unknown	Unknown	November 30, 1961
A serial killer is murdering people in New York City, and almost all the victims are waitresses. The investigators decide that a shy waitress named Marla Jensen would be the perfect bait to lure the killer into a trap. Jane Wyman, Peter Leeds, Nancy Rennick, John Lasell, and Bill Zuckert guest-star.
10	"The Panic Wagon"	Unknown	Unknown	December 7, 1961
A wealthy horse-breeder dies in an avalanche set off by a construction company's dynamite charge — and the investigators suspect it was no accident. Robert Webber, Albert Salmi, and Jean Engstrom guest-star.
11	"The Mind's Own Fire"	Unknown	Unknown	December 14, 1961
Maggie Peters finds romance when she investigates a series of fires in an industrial town in New England. Dennis Hopper, James Dunn, and Mildred Dunnock guest-star.
12	"Something for Charity"	Unknown	Unknown	December 21, 1961
Russ Andrews and Steve Banks persuade a down-on-her-luck woman to arrange a staged marriage with Banks in an effort to trap a large-scale, murder-for-insurance ring. Ida Lupino, Val Avery, and Linda Watkins guest-star.
13	"The Dead End Man"	Unknown	Unknown	December 28, 1961
A woman named Margaret Ransom is about to have her missing husband Henry declared legally dead so that she can collect his life insurance. Dorothy Green, Henry Jones, William Fawcett, Philip Ober, Pat Carroll, William Challee, James Millhollin, Ted Newton, Vaughn Taylor, Dick Wessel, and Clegg Hoyt guest-star.
