= Jack Hogan =

American actor (1929–2023)

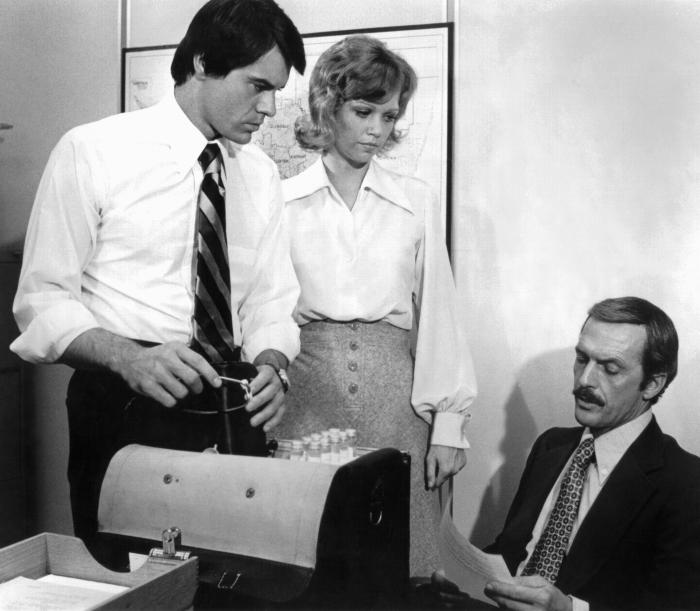
- Robert Urich (left), Maureen Reagan and Jack Hogan, pose for a publicity photo for the television series The Specialists, 1974
- Born: Richard Roland Benson Jr. November 24, 1929; Chapel Hill, North Carolina, U.S.
- Died: December 6, 2023 (aged 94); Bainbridge Island, Washington, U.S.
- Occupation: Actor
- Years active: 1956–1993
- Spouses: Barbara Bates; Joyce Nizzari (m. 1967; div. 1980)
- Children: 2

Richard Roland Benson Jr. (November 24, 1929 – December 6, 2023), known professionally as Jack Hogan, was an American actor most notable for the role of PFC William G. Kirby on the 1960s television show Combat!

== Biography ==
Born in Chapel Hill, North Carolina, Hogan was an architecture student in college before joining the Air Force, where he became a staff sergeant during the Korean War. After he returned to civilian life, he studied drama at the Pasadena Playhouse and in New York. He worked part-time as a lifeguard until he gained the role on Combat. He portrayed Sgt. Jerry Miller on the NBC-TV crime drama Adam-12. In addition to acting, he was a casting director for Magnum, P.I. and operated a building business.

== Personal life and death ==
Hogan married Barbara Bates (not to be confused with actress Barbara Bates).

Jack Hogan died at his home in Bainbridge Island, Washington, on December 6, 2023, at the age of 94.

== Films ==
- Man from Del Rio (1956)
- The Bonnie Parker Story (1958)
- Paratroop Command (1959)
- The Legend of Tom Dooley (1959)
- The Cat Burglar (1961)

== Television ==
- Harbor Command (1957)
- Tombstone Territory Episode: "Ride Out at Noon" (1957)
- Have Gun - Will Travel Episode: “The Teacher” (1958)
- Sea Hunt (1958–1959)
- Rifleman (1959) (Sea. 1, Ep. 36)
- Bat Masterson (1959) (S1:E34) as Jack and (S2:E1) as Stuart Chancellor
- Laramie (1959) (Season 1, Episode 9)
- Ripcord, Episode: "Radar Rescue", (1961)
- Lawman (1961) The Juror
- Bat Masterson (1961)
- Cheyenne, Episode: "Storm Center", (1961)
- The Rifleman (1962)
- Combat! (1962–1967) (112 ep.)
- Garrison's Gorillas (1968)
- Adam-12
- Hawaii Five-O (1973-1976)
- Houston, We've Got a Problem (1974)
- Sierra (1974)
- The Specialists (1975)
- Mobile One (1975)
- The Oregon Trail (1977) (Episode 7) as Henry Bowman
- Jake and the Fatman (1989–1990)
