= War of the Colossal Beast =

1958 film by Bert I. Gordon

- Theatrical release poster by Albert Kallis
- Directed by: Bert I. Gordon
- Screenplay by: George Worthing Yates
- Story by: Bert I. Gordon
- Produced by: Bert I. Gordon
- Starring: Sally Fraser; Roger Pace; Dean Parkin
- Cinematography: Jack A. Marta
- Edited by: Ronald Sinclair
- Music by: Albert Glasser
- Production company: Carmel Productions
- Distributed by: American International Pictures
- Release date: June 30, 1958 (United States)
- Running time: 69 minutes
- Country: United States
- Language: English

War of the Colossal Beast (a.k.a. Revenge of the Colossal Man and The Colossal Beast) is a 1958 black-and-white science fiction film, written, produced, and directed by Bert I. Gordon for his Carmel Productions, and starring Dean Parkin, Sally Fraser, and Roger Pace. It is the sequel to Gordon's earlier The Amazing Colossal Man (1957) and was distributed theatrically on June 30, 1958 by American International Pictures as the bottom half of a double feature with Attack of the Puppet People (1958). (Historian Bill Warren lists the double feature's release date as August 7, 1958.)

The film's storyline picks up where The Amazing Colossal Man left off, although it was not marketed as a sequel and features a different cast. The film's brief death-scene finale was filmed in color.

== Plot ==
Upon hearing of several recent robberies of food delivery trucks in Mexico, Joyce Manning, Army Lt. Colonel Glenn Manning's sister, becomes convinced that her brother survived after being exposed to radiation from an atomic bomb (as seen in The Amazing Colossal Man). Along with Army Major Mark Baird and scientist Dr. Carmichael (Russ Bender), Joyce goes to Mexico to look for Glenn and finds that he has, in fact, survived, but was left disfigured and nearly mindless by the trauma of his fall. Glenn is eventually captured, drugged by the Army, and transported back to the United States. He is able to escape again and goes on a rampage through Los Angeles and Hollywood. He nearly kills a school bus full of children. Joyce reasons with him, and he slowly is brought back to his senses. Now realizing what he has become and what he has done, Glenn commits suicide by electrocuting himself on high-voltage power lines near the Griffith Observatory.

== Cast ==
- Duncan "Dean" Parkin as Lt. Colonel Glenn Manning / Colossal Man
- Sally Fraser as Joyce Manning
- Roger Pace as Major Mark Baird
- Russ Bender as Dr. Carmichael
- Rico Alaniz as Sgt. Luis Murillo
- Charles Stewart as Captain Harris
- George Becwar as John Swanson
- Roy Gordon as Mayor
- Robert Hernandez as Miguel
- George Milan as General Nelson

== Production ==
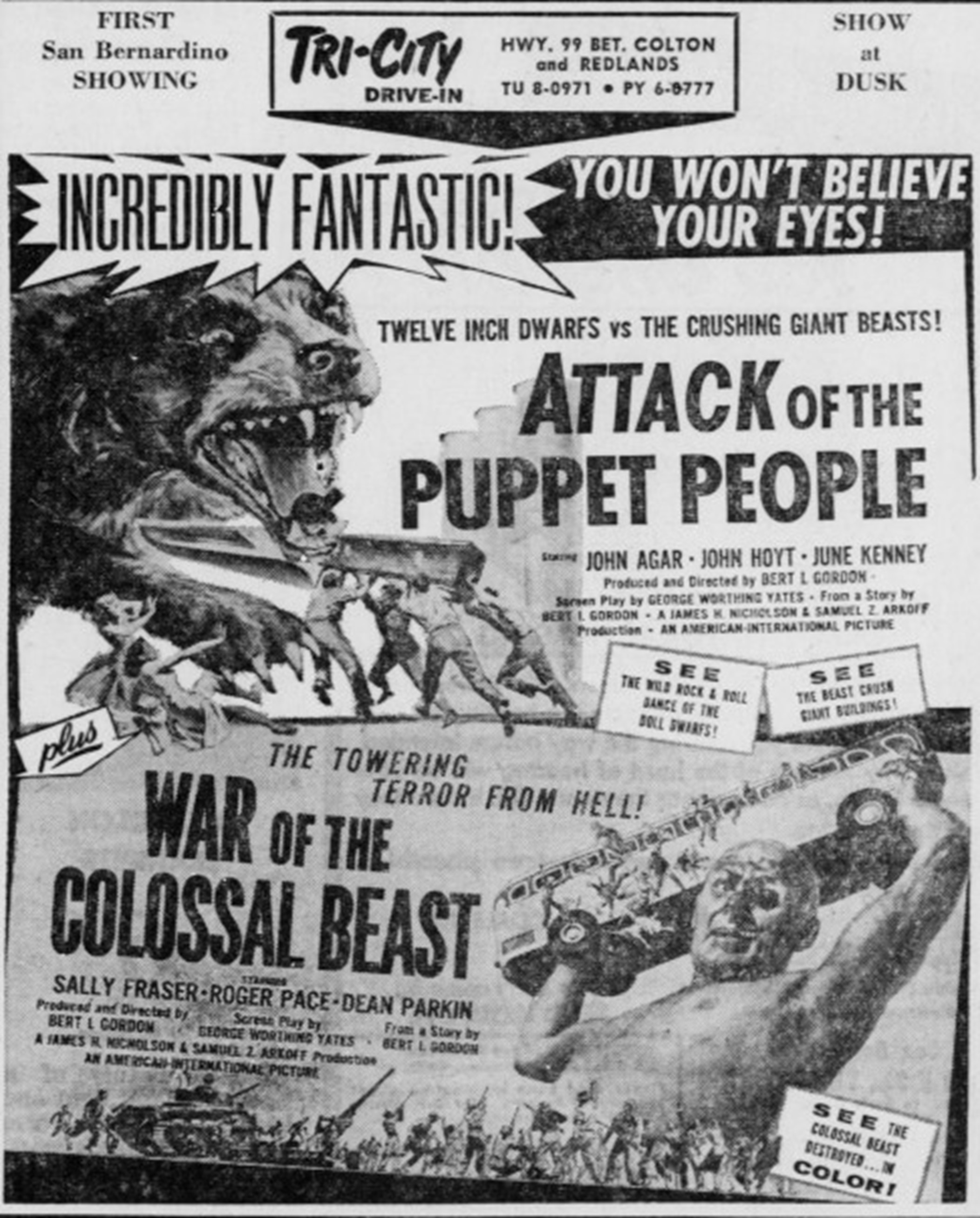
Drive-in advertisement from 1958 for War of the Colossal Beast and co-feature, Attack of the Puppet People.

War of the Colossal Beast was produced, directed, and written by Bert I. Gordon and co-produced with Samuel Z. Arkoff. Although most of it is shot in black-and-white, the ending was shot in color for the electrocution scene and doctored in black-and-white. The producers decided to use the very heavy make-up on Dean Parkin as a way to disguise the fact that a different actor was playing Colonel Glenn Manning than in the previous installment The Amazing Colossal Man, especially since a dream sequence flashing back to the original film featured Glenn Langan, the star of the earlier film. Dean Parkin also played the lead monster role in another Bert I. Gordon film, The Cyclops.

Some of the tiny-sized props created for The Amazing Colossal Man by special effects technician Paul Blaisdell were featured again in this sequel via flashbacks.

== Reception and legacy ==
Contemporary film fan-historians Kim R. Holston and Tom Winchester noted that the film was "... a low-budget ship with Bert Gordon at the helm, so the special effects are unsurprisingly average; one always knows the 'giant' was filmed separately and mixed in with other shots".

=== Mystery Science Theater 3000 ===
War of the Colossal Beast was featured in season 3, episode 19 of Mystery Science Theater 3000.

== See also ==
- List of American films of 1958
- Attack of the 50 Foot Woman
