= Gene Persson =

American film director

- Born: Eugene Clair Persson; January 12, 1934; Long Beach, California, U.S.
- Died: June 6, 2008 (aged 74); New York City, U.S.
- Occupation(s): Actor, producer
- Years active: 1946–1961
- Spouses: Shirley Knight (m. 1959; div. 1969) Ruby Persson (m. 1972)
- Children: 3; including Kaitlin Hopkins

Eugene Clair "Gene" Persson (January 12, 1934 – June 6, 2008) was an American actor, theatrical and film producer, best known for his work as the co-producer and co-creator of the original 1967 production of the Broadway musical comedy, You're a Good Man, Charlie Brown, as well as the show's 1999 Broadway revival, which won two Tony Awards.

== Early life and career ==
Gene Persson was born in Long Beach, California the son of Oscar Persson and Leah Krascoff. He began his career in entertainment as a child actor on radio, television and film, including one of the kids in Ma and Pa Kettle (1949) and two of its followups. He returned to acting after having served in the United States military during the Korean War, appearing in B movies, including Paramount Pictures' The Party Crashers (1958), as well as Earth vs. the Spider (1958) and Bloodlust! (1961).

== Producer ==
Persson married actress Shirley Knight in 1959. He soon began switching his career focus from acting to producing around the time of his marriage. In 1964 their daughter Kaitlin was born, He began producing plays in New York City and Los Angeles in which Knight held a starring position. Their joint productions included early plays by LeRoi Jones, who is also known as Amiri Baraka, such as The Slave, The Toilet and Dutchman. Their Broadway plays later included Stanley Mann's Room. He also produced a controversial play entitled The Trial of Lee Harvey Oswald on Broadway in 1967.

On screen, Persson produced Dutchman with Anthony Harvey, who was a first time director at the time of production. The film, which starred Shirley Knight and Al Freeman Jr., is still screened at film festivals and museums today, according to Variety.

Knight and Persson later divorced in 1969, but remained lifelong personal and professional friends. Their daughter was raised by Knight's second husband, the English writer John Hopkins.

Persson moved to London in 1969. There he produced a total of five plays for British playwright Peter Barnes, including The Ruling Class. He later collaborated with Tennessee Williams during the 1970s to produce the British revival of The Glass Menagerie as well as The Red Devil Battery Sign, both of which were produced in the United Kingdom. Persson and Williams also teamed up to bring An Evening with Tennessee Williams and This Is to San Francisco.

In 1972 he married Ruby Persson and they had two sons: Lukas and Markus.

=== Charlie Brown productions ===
Persson and Arthur Whitelaw co-produced and co-created You're a Good Man, Charlie Brown in 1967. The musical was based on the Peanuts characters created by cartoonist Charles M. Schulz. The book in which they and their creative team adapted the musical was by John Gordon, which was a pseudonym. According to Variety, Persson's musical "has gone on to be one of the most produced musicals ever." Persson later returned as the producer of the 1999 Broadway revival of You're a Good Man, Charlie Brown. The show earned two Tony Awards in 1999.

Persson also produced the 1973 television special of the original musical, You're a Good Man, Charlie Brown for the Hallmark Hall of Fame. Persson continued to produce stage productions for much of the next decade. Among these included the Peanuts musical comedy Snoopy!!! The Musical, which he both directed and produced.

Persson was working on a musical stage version of the 1965 television holiday classic, A Charlie Brown Christmas, at the time of his death in 2008.

== Death ==
Gene Persson died of a heart attack in Manhattan on June 6, 2008, at the age of 74. He was survived by his wife of 36 years, actress and artist Ruby Persson, and his three children, Kaitlin Hopkins, an actress; Lukas Persson, a filmmaker and writer; and Markus Persson, a musician.
