= Bert I. Gordon =

American filmmaker (1922–2023)

- Born: Bert Ira Gordon; September 24, 1922; Kenosha, Wisconsin, U.S.
- Died: March 8, 2023 (aged 100); Los Angeles, California, U.S.
- Occupations: Film director, producer, writer, visual effects artist
- Spouses: Flora Lang (m. 1945; div. 1979); Eva Marklstorfer (m. 1980)
- Children: 4, including Susan
- Website: www.bertigordon.com

Bert Ira Gordon (September 24, 1922 – March 8, 2023) was an American film director, producer, screenwriter, and visual effects artist. He is best known for screenwriting and producing and/or directing science fiction and horror B-movies such as King Dinosaur (1955), The Amazing Colossal Man (1957), Earth vs. the Spider (1958), Village of the Giants (1965), The Food of the Gods (1976), and Empire of the Ants (1977).

Most of Gordon's work is in the idiom of giant monster films, for which he used rear-projection to create the special effects. He was nicknamed "Mr. B.I.G." by Forrest J Ackerman, a reference to both his initials and his films' tendency to feature super-sized creatures.

The 20th Insect Fear Film Festival at UIUC in 2003 honored Gordon with a retrospective and showcase of his iconic films featuring giant insects. With at least ten titles focused on oversized bugs, Gordon was celebrated as the festival's special guest and received a plaque and certificate in recognition of his lasting contributions to the "big bug" genre.

== Career ==
Gordon was born in Kenosha, Wisconsin, on September 24, 1922, the son of Sadeline (Barnett) and Charles Abraham Gordon. He began making home movies in 16mm after his aunt gave him a camera for his 13th birthday. He dropped out of college to join the Army Air Forces in World War II. After the war, he married and he and his wife began making television commercials. He later edited British feature films to fit half-hour time slots and became a production assistant on Racket Squad (1951–53) and camera man on Serpent Island (1954).

In 1955, Gordon made his first feature, King Dinosaur, followed by The Cyclops in 1957, which co-starred Lon Chaney Jr. and Gloria Talbot. In 1957, he began his prolific association with American International Pictures, beginning with The Amazing Colossal Man and its 1958 sequel, War of the Colossal Beast. AIP distributed all of his other late-50s opuses: Beginning of the End, featuring Peter Graves, in 1957, and Earth vs the Spider and Attack of the Puppet People in 1958.

In 1960, after filming Tormented, he wrote, produced and directed The Boy and the Pirates, starring active and popular child star of the time Charles Herbert and Gordon's own daughter, Susan Gordon. In October, Gordon sued AIP for fraud over four films they made together.

On June 27, 2006, Sony Pictures Home Entertainment released a Midnite Movies double DVD set with the rarely seen The Boy and the Pirates, and Crystalstone (1987) by Mexican director Antonio Peláez.

In 2012, Gordon hosted and moderated a screening of The Amazing Colossal Man in Dallas, Texas.

Gordon held a degree from the University of Wisconsin–Madison.

== Personal life and death ==
Gordon was married from 1945 to 1979 to Flora Lang (1925–2016); the two divorced in 1979. They had three daughters: Susan (who predeceased her parents), Carol, and Patricia. Gordon had a fourth daughter, Christina, with his second wife, Eva.

Gordon died in Los Angeles on March 8, 2023, at the age of 100.

== Filmography ==
As director-producer. Source for credits, years and primary titles:

Year	Title	Comments
1954	Serpent Island	Producer, editor and cinematographer
1955	King Dinosaur	
1957	The Cyclops	Also screenwriter, special effects
1957	The Amazing Colossal Man	Also screenwriter, special effects
1957	Beginning of the End	Also special effects
1958	Earth vs. the Spider	a.k.a. The Spider
1958	War of the Colossal Beast	a.k.a. Terror Strikes. Also screenwriter, special effects
1958	Attack of the Puppet People	Also screenwriter
1960	Tormented	Also special effects
1960	The Boy and the Pirates	
1962	The Magic Sword	
1965	Village of the Giants	Based on "The Food of the Gods" by H. G. Wells. Also special effects
1966	Picture Mommy Dead	a.k.a. Color Mommy Dead
1970	How to Succeed with Sex	Director and screenwriter only
1972	The Witching	a.k.a. Necromancy. Also screenwriter.
1972	The Mad Bomber	a.k.a. Detective Geronimo, The Police Connection
1976	The Food of the Gods	Also screenwriter. Based on "The Food of the Gods" by H. G. Wells
1977	Empire of the Ants	Also screenwriter. Based on "Empire of the Ants" by H. G. Wells
1981	Burned at the Stake	a.k.a. The Coming. Director only
1982	Let's Do It!	Director only
1985	The Big Bet	Also screenwriter
1990	Satan's Princess	a.k.a. Heat from Another Sun, Princess of Darkness, Malediction. Also producer
2014	Secrets of a Psychopath	Also screenwriter

== Legacy ==
Of these titles, King Dinosaur, The Amazing Colossal Man, Earth Vs. The Spider, War of the Colossal Beast, The Magic Sword, Tormented, Beginning of the End, and Village of the Giants were featured on the film-spoofing series Mystery Science Theater 3000. Later, Attack of the Puppet People was featured on the spin-off to MST3K, Rifftrax, as was a redux of The Magic Sword.

== See also ==
- Ed Wood
- Herschell Gordon Lewis
- Coleman Francis
- Roger Corman
