= The Amazing Colossal Man =

1957 film by Bert I. Gordon

- Theatrical release poster by Albert Kallis
- Directed by: Bert I. Gordon
- Screenplay by: Mark Hanna; Bert I. Gordon; George Worthing Yates (uncredited)
- Based on: The Nth Man by Homer Eon Flint (uncredited)
- Produced by: Bert I. Gordon
- Starring: Glenn Langan; Cathy Downs; William Hudson; Larry Thor
- Cinematography: Joseph F. Biroc
- Edited by: Ronald Sinclair
- Music by: Albert Glasser
- Production company: Malibu Productions
- Distributed by: American International Pictures
- Release dates: August 28, 1957 (Anaheim, California)
- Running time: 80 minutes
- Country: United States
- Language: English
- Budget: $138,000
- Box office: $848,000 (U.S.)

The Amazing Colossal Man (also known as The Colossal Man) is a 1957 American black-and-white science fiction film from American International Pictures. Produced and directed by Bert I. Gordon, it stars Glenn Langan, Cathy Downs, William Hudson, and Larry Thor. It is an uncredited adaptation of Homer Eon Flint's 1928 short science fiction novel The Nth Man.

The film's storyline concerns U.S. Army Lt. Colonel Glenn Manning who survives a plutonium explosion and grows 8 to 10 feet a day, ultimately reaching 60 feet tall, but loses his mind in the process.

During the 1960s, American International Television syndicated the film to television. It and its sequel, War of the Colossal Beast (1958), were mocked on Mystery Science Theater 3000.

== Plot ==
At a military site in Desert Rock, Nevada, a test explosion of the first atomic plutonium bomb does not detonate as expected. When an unidentified civilian aircraft crash lands near the site, Lt. Colonel Glenn Manning runs into the detonation area to rescue the pilot. Once in the detonation area, the bomb goes off, and Glenn gets caught in the radioactive blast.

Surviving the blast but suffering from third-degree burns over almost his whole body, Glenn is treated by specialist Dr. Paul Linstrom and military scientist Dr. Eric Coulter. Glenn's fiancée, Carol Forrest, anxiously awaits a prognosis, but Linstrom refrains from telling her that Glenn is extremely unlikely to survive. The following day, Linstrom and Coulter are stunned to discover that Glenn's burns have completely healed. That evening, Carol is not allowed to see him and learns the military moved Glenn to an army rehabilitation and research center in Summit, Nevada. She drives there and gets admitted entry. Upon entering his room, Carol faints in horror as Glenn has mutated into a giant about 16 feet tall.

The next day, Linstrom tells Carol that Glenn's exposure to the plutonium blast caused his body's cells to multiply at an accelerated rate, resulting in his abnormal growth. Linstrom admits that he and Coulter do not know if they can stop it and that if they do not, Glenn will keep growing until he dies. Awakening the day after, Glenn is initially frightened, then greatly disturbed. Carol sees him the following day to comfort him, but Glenn is now roughly 22 feet tall, distant, and depressed. While the public knows he survived the explosion, the military has kept the truth of his condition secret.

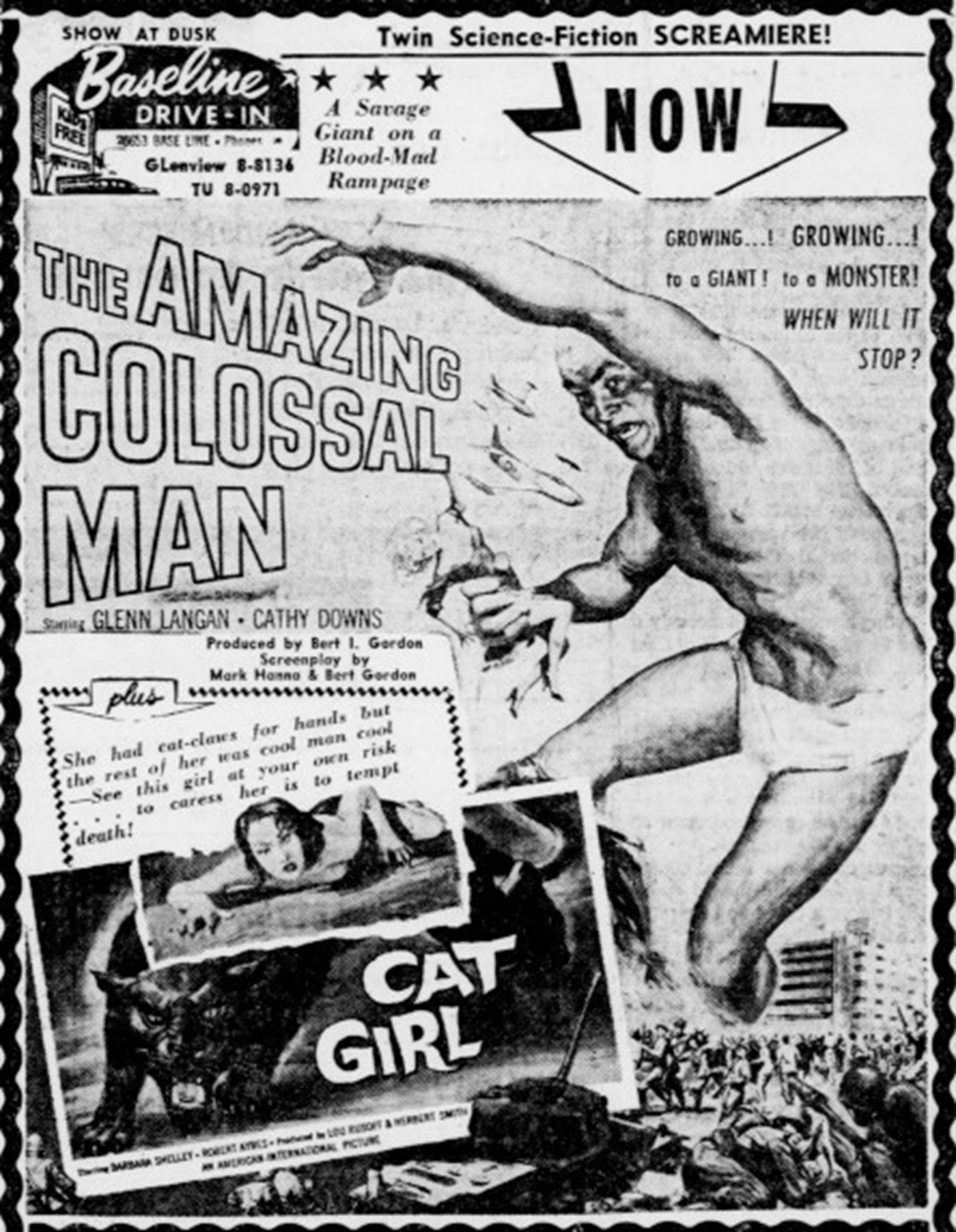
Drive-in advertisement from 1957 for The Amazing Colossal Man and co-feature, Cat Girl.

As Glenn reaches 30 feet tall, Linstrom recommends that Carol spend time with him. Despite her encouragement, Glenn is angry and bitter. Linstrom reveals that Glenn's heart is growing at only half the rate of his body, and soon it will not be able to support his enormous size and weight. He warns Carol that Glenn's sanity will decline before his heart finally explodes. That night, Carol tries to console Glenn, but he loses his temper and shouts at Carol to leave him alone.

The following morning, Glenn disappears as Coulter reports to Linstrom that he may have found a solution to Glenn's growth. Led by Colonel Hallock, the military conducts a 10-mile-wide search for the now 50-foot-tall Glenn, but with no results. When Carol asks Linstrom if she can help in their search, he cautions Carol that Glenn may no longer recognize her. Coulter reveals that he has created a special syringe filled with a serum that will stop his growth.

Meanwhile, the local news relays that a "giant man" was spotted approaching Las Vegas. As the military heads there, Glenn, now over 60 feet tall and confused, is drawn to the Vegas Strip. He wreaks havoc on various casinos. When his behavior alarms the police, they begin firing at Glenn, enraging him. He destroys the Pioneer Club's Vegas Vic sign, then heads toward Hoover Dam as army helicopters track his movements.

Linstrom, Carol, and Coulter attempt to intercept Hallock's troops. After landing at the dam, Lindstrom uses a bullhorn to try reasoning with Glenn, who seems to listen. Coulter and Linstrom take the enormous syringe and plunge it into Glenn's ankle. He removes it and angrily spears Coulter with it, killing him. Then Glenn grabs Carol and starts across the dam. Linstrom stops Hallock from attacking prematurely before he and Carol implore Glenn to release her. Though Glenn is disoriented, he complies. Once she's free, Hallock orders his men to open fire, causing Glenn to tumble into the Colorado River to his apparent death.

== Cast ==
Actor	Role
Glenn Langan	Lt. Colonel Glenn Manning (credited as Glen Langan)
Cathy Downs	Carol Forrest
William Hudson	Dr. Paul Linstrom
Larry Thor	Major Eric Coulter, MD
James Seay	Colonel Hallock
Frank Jenks	Truck Driver
Russ Bender	Richard Kingman
Hank Patterson	Henry
Jimmy Cross	Sergeant at reception desk
June Jocelyn	Nurse Wilson
Stanley Lachman	Lt. Cline
Harry Raybould	MP at Main Gate
Jean Moorhead	Woman in Bathtub
Scott Peters	Sgt. Lee Carter
Myron Cook	Captain Thomas
Michael Harris	Police Lt. Keller
Bill Cassady	Lt. Peterson
Dick Nelson	Sgt. Hansen
Edmund Cobb	Dr. McDermott
Paul Hahn	Attendant
Diana Darrin	Hospital Receptionist
Lyn Osborn	Sgt. Taylor
Jack Kosslyn	Lieutenant in briefing room
William Hughes	Bombsite Control Officer
Keith Hetherington	Newscaster
John Daheim	Soldier (uncredited)
Judd Holdren	Robert Allen (uncredited)
Harold Miller	Official (uncredited)

== Production ==
Jim Nicholson of American International Pictures had the rights to Homer Eon Flint's novel The Nth Man (1928), about a man who was 10 miles high. Nicholson thought it could be adapted to cash in on the success of The Incredible Shrinking Man (released six months earlier in 1957) and originally announced Roger Corman as director. Charles B. Griffith was hired to adapt the novel, and he turned it into a comedy. Then Corman dropped out, and Bert I. Gordon was hired. Gordon worked on the script with Griffith, but the collaboration only lasted a day before Griffith quit. Instead, Griffith's regular writing partner Mark Hanna stepped in.

Before Gordon became involved, the film was conceived with Dick Miller in mind for the lead. It was Gordon's first film for AIP. Principal photography began late in June 1957. AIP's special effects technician Paul Blaisdell designed and built all of the tiny-sized props used in the film. These props later appeared again in the film's 1958 sequel War of the Colossal Beast via flashback footage.

== Release ==
The Amazing Colossal Man was released on August 28, 1957, screening at the Paulo Drive-in theatre in Anaheim, California. It played with the film Cat Girl as a double feature. The film was distributed by American International Pictures in the United States.

== Reception and legacy ==
Critical reviews were generally positive, with film reviewer Richard W. Nason at The New York Times commenting: "... imaginative story premise". A similar review in Variety, noted: "... Glenn Langan delivers persuasively ... Technical departments are well handled".

At the film review aggregator website Rotten Tomatoes, the film holds an approval rating of 38% based on 8 reviews, with a weighted average rating of 5.4/10.

The film and its sequel were featured and riffed on the cult classic mocking series Mystery Science Theater 3000; actor Mike Nelson portrayed the title character twice in the mid-movie host sections of the series' third season episodes 9 and 19, in which the film and its sequel War of the Colossal Beast were shown. In episode 9, the character seems more aggressive to Joel Robinson (Joel Hodgson) and the bots when the Satellite of Love hit him and nearly proceeds to attack the trio after Tom Servo (Kevin Murphy) unintentionally insulted Glenn before leaving when suffering from a brief heart attack, as portrayed in the film.

The film was parodied in "Nutcracker Sweet", season 1, episode 2 of Robot Chicken in 2005 when a large bald giant, wearing a sarong as a diaper, is struck in the crotch with a wrecking ball as he terrorizes a city, as part of the "Ode to the Nut Shot" sketch.

The trailer has also been shown in the film projected at the Disney's Hollywood Studios restaurant, Sci-Fi Dine-In Theater.

== See also ==
- List of American films of 1957
- List of films set in Las Vegas
- The Incredible Shrinking Man (1957 film)
- Attack of the 50 Foot Woman (1958 film)
