= Peter Tufts House =

Historic house in Massachusetts, United States

- U.S. National Register of Historic Places
- U.S. National Historic Landmark
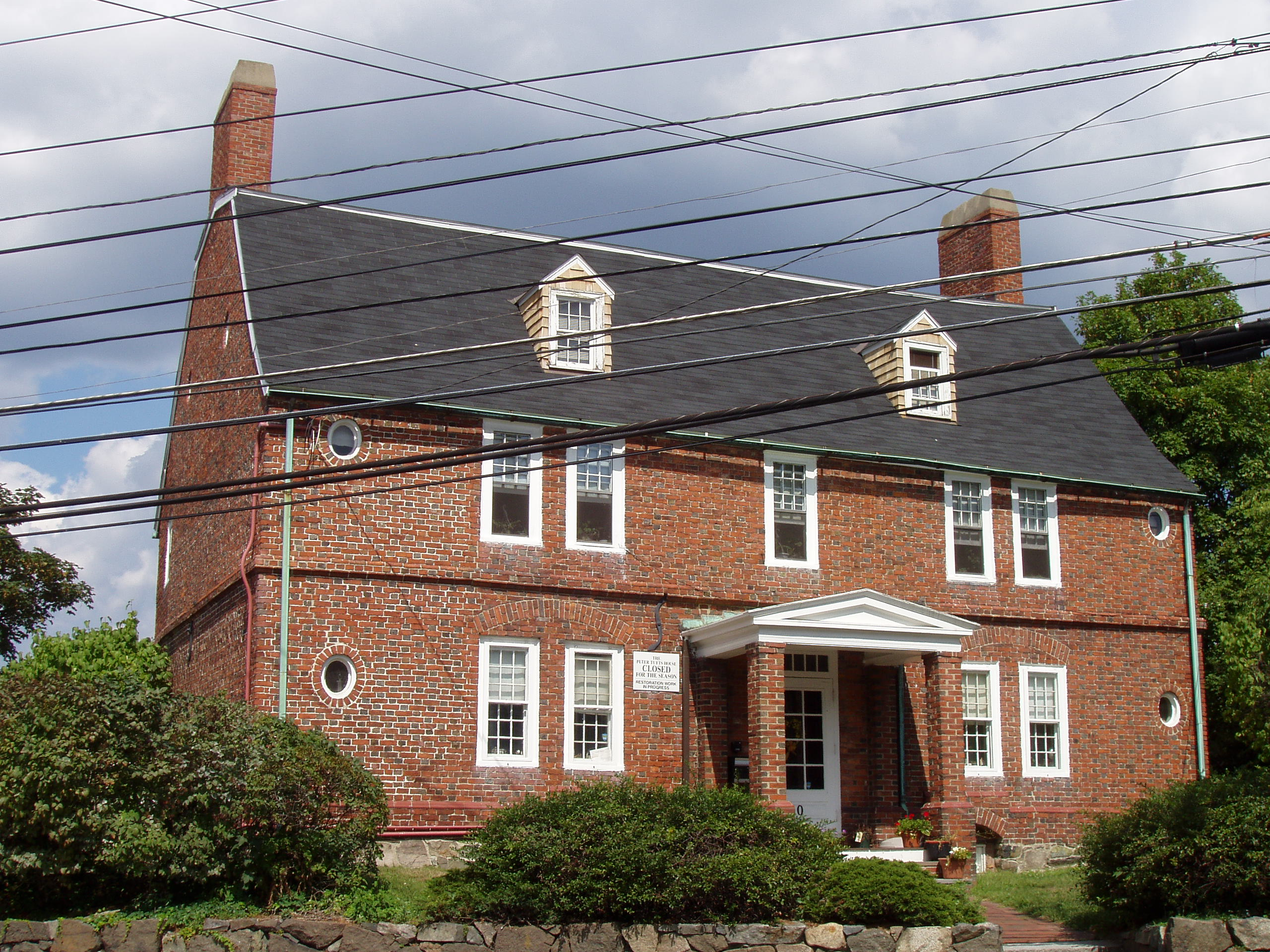
- Peter Tufts House, Medford, Massachusetts

- Location within Massachusetts Location within the United States
- Location: 350 Riverside Avenue, Medford, Massachusetts
- Coordinates: 42°24′41.53″N 71°5′36.91″W
- Built: 1677–1680; 346 years ago
- Architect: Capt. Peter Tufts
- Architectural style: Georgian
- NRHP reference No.: 68000044

Significant dates
- Added to NRHP: November 24, 1968
- Designated NHL: November 24, 1968

The Peter Tufts House (formerly and incorrectly known as the Cradock House) is a Colonial American house located in Medford, Massachusetts. It is thought to have been built between 1677 and 1678. Past historians considered it to be the oldest brick house in the United States, although that distinction belongs to Bacon's Castle, the 1665 plantation home of Virginian Arthur Allen. It is also believed to be, possibly, the oldest surviving house in the U.S. with a gambrel roof.

Its brick walls are 18 inches (0.46 m) thick. Its end chimneys were incorporated into the walls, which is unusual for the time and area of its construction, and its "separate flues are brought together in the gables. The steep main roof slope (51°) is truncated at the top to form one of the earliest-known gambrel roofs."

== History ==
The house has been called the "fort" and the "garrison house" because of its thick walls and portholes. For many years it was believed that the house was built by Mathew Cradock, one of 35 founding members of the Massachusetts Bay Company. He reputedly owned the first wooden toll bridge in America (1632), but Cradock only owned the land and never even visited America. In 1677, Richard Russell of Charlestown sold the land with "one dwelling house and barn" to Peter Tufts [Sr.] of Charlestown, although a prior agreement may have been made, with Tufts Sr. likely already settled on the land.

The house was probably built by Peter Tufts, who sold it to his son, Peter (Captain) Tufts Jr. in 1680. The brick mason was William Bucknam, brought over in 1632 from Chelsea, England to build the house. It is the son for whom the house is named. In 1728, the eastern side of the property was sold to Edward Oakes of Malden.

In 1887, Samuel Lawrence saved the house from demolition when he purchased it as a wedding gift for his daughter. The interior was remodeled at this time in the Colonial Revival style. Only the support beams and parts of the staircase were kept intact from the original period. Much of the exterior remains original, except the front porch was added between 1889 and 1900.

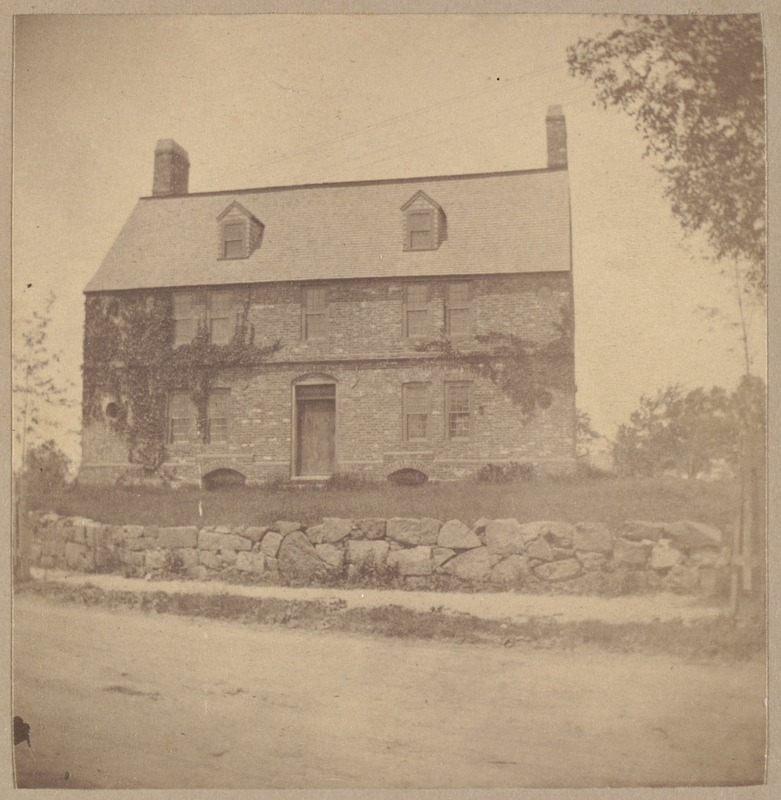
Peter Tufts House (fka Cradock House), ca. 1895–1905. Archive of Photographic Documentation of Early Massachusetts Architecture, Boston Public Library.

In 1892, when the City of Medford was incorporated, an image of the house was used in its city seal. The house was purchased for $9,700 by William Sumner Appleton with donations. He offered it to the Medford Historical Society, but they said they were unable to care for it at that time. In 1930, ownership was transferred to the Society for the Preservation of New England Antiquities (now Historic New England).

In 1982, it was purchased by the Medford Historical Society and Museum. The society spent $45,000 over the decades on repairs and pressing safety issues. In 2013, the home's caretaker moved out and the house was rented on a month-to-month basis. In 2016, the Society's board voted to put the home up for sale. It went up for sale in June 2017 at a price of $657,500. It eventually sold for $562,500 in 2019 and was available to rent in 2022 at a price of $3,600 a month.

Charles Tufts (1781–1876), a descendant of Peter Tufts Sr., would later donate land in Medford for the campus of Tufts University.

== See also ==
- Peter and Oliver Tufts House
- List of the oldest buildings in Massachusetts
- National Register of Historic Places listings in Medford, Massachusetts
- List of National Historic Landmarks in Massachusetts
