= Sonny Tufts =

American actor (1911–1970)

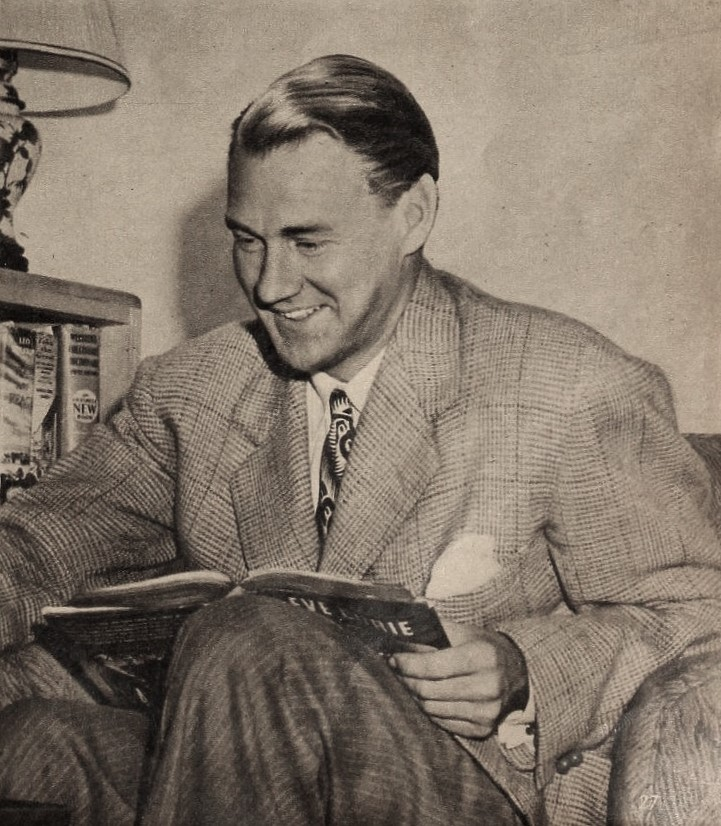
- Tufts in 1943
- Born: Bowen Charlton Tufts III; July 16, 1911; Boston, Massachusetts, U.S.
- Died: June 4, 1970 (aged 58); Santa Monica, California, U.S.
- Resting place: Munroe Cemetery
- Education: Yale University
- Occupation: Actor
- Years active: 1939–1968
- Spouse: Barbara Dare (m. 1938; div. 1953)
- Relatives: Charles Tufts (great uncle)

Bowen Charlton "Sonny" Tufts III (July 16, 1911 – June 4, 1970) was an American stage, film, and television actor. He is best known for the films he made as a contract star at Paramount in the 1940s, including So Proudly We Hail!. He also starred in the cult classic Cat-Women of the Moon.

== Early life and family ==
Bowen Charlton Tufts III (some sources give "Charleston") (nicknamed "Sonny") was born in Boston into a prominent banking family, the son of Octavia Emily (Williams) and Bowen Charlton Tufts. The Tufts family patriarch, Peter Tufts, sailed to America from Wilby, Norfolk, England in 1638. His granduncle was businessman and philanthropist Charles Tufts, for whom Tufts University is named.

Tufts attended the Phillips Exeter Academy, He later broke with the family banking tradition by not studying business at Harvard and attending rival Yale instead and following other pursuits. There he played for the Yale football team, served as an editor of the campus humor magazine The Yale Record, was inducted a member of the elite, secret Skull and Bones society, and performed in Yale's famous musical group, the Whiffenpoofs.

It was while on a Whiffenpoofs tour of Europe that Tufts decided to study opera, struck by the urge during a stop in Naples. He followed up with a year of tutelage in Paris and three more in the United States.

== Career ==
After graduating from Yale in 1935, Tufts auditioned with the Metropolitan Opera in New York City, but eventually worked on the Broadway stage. He appeared in Who's Who, and Sing for Your Supper in 1939. Tufts then began singing in hotels and nightclubs.

=== Paramount ===
A Yale classmate of Tufts' later convinced him to move to Hollywood to begin a career as an actor. Upon arriving there, Tufts' friend, hotel manager Jack Donnelly, accompanied him to Paramount Pictures and introduced him to casting director Joe Egli. Egli shot a screen test with Tufts, who was then signed to Paramount.

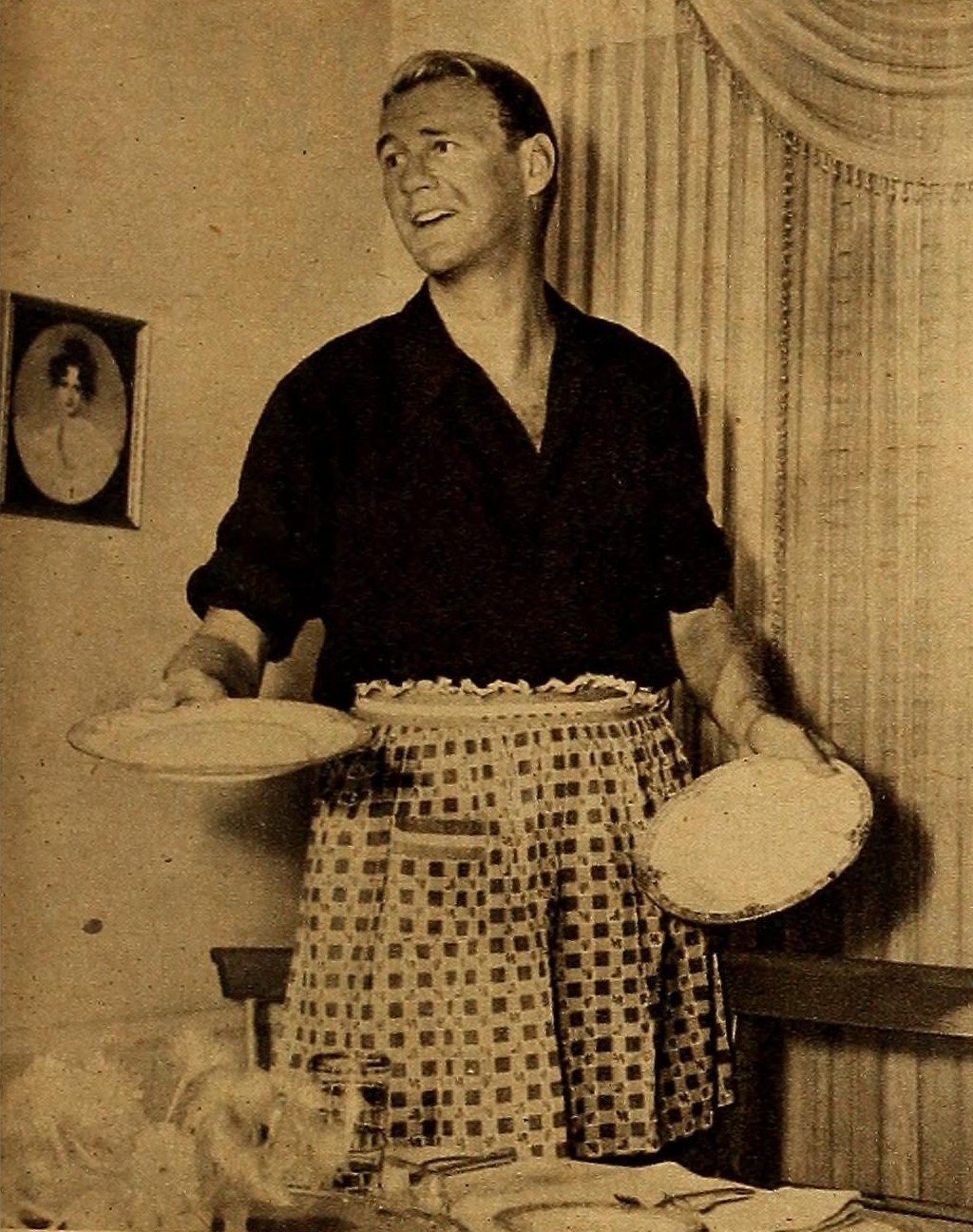
Tufts, 1943

His first role was as Kansas, an affable Marine and love interest of Paulette Goddard in the 1943 World War II romantic drama So Proudly We Hail!. The film was a critical and box-office hit, largely due to the three female leads: Claudette Colbert, Paulette Goddard, and Veronica Lake. Tufts' performance was praised by critics and the role served as a launching pad for his career. After the release of the film, Tufts received 1700 fan letters a week and was named "The Find of 1943."

Due to an old college football injury, Tufts was unable to join the military and serve overseas in the war. With Hollywood's ranks of leading men heavily depleted by the war effort, Tufts was borrowed by RKO to play opposite leading lady Olivia de Havilland in the comedy Government Girl (1944); Paramount got a loan of Maureen O'Hara in exchange. The farm-out to RKO meant Tufts had to drop out of Standing Room Only, where he was replaced by Fred MacMurray. Government Girl was a huge hit and Tufts was voted the number one "Star of Tomorrow" by Australian exhibitors for 1944.

Before filming of So Proudly We Hail! was complete, director Mark Sandrich commissioned So Proudly's screenwriter Allan Scott to write a vehicle for Tufts and his co-star Paulette Goddard. That film, entitled I Love a Soldier (1944) was a mild hit.

Sandrich directed Tufts' next film, Here Come the Waves (1944), which was a huge success, due in part to stars Bing Crosby and Betty Hutton. Sandrich died in 1945.

Tufts made another musical comedy Bring On the Girls (1945) with Eddie Bracken and Veronica Lake, replacing Dick Powell. Tufts sang several songs, but the film was a box-office disappointment. He made a cameo along with most Paramount stars in Duffy's Tavern (1945), singing "Swinging on a Star".

He was reunited with Lake in Miss Susie Slagle's (1946) alongside Joan Caulfield.

Paramount tried him in a Western The Virginian (1946), though it was in a supporting role. He was reunited with De Havilland in The Well Groomed Bride (1946), replacing Dennis O'Keefe but she wound up with Ray Milland at the end of the film. However, Paramount did give Tufts the star part in Swell Guy (1946) opposite Ann Blyth. He also co-starred opposite Betty Hutton in Cross My Heart (1946).

Tufts was the romantic male lead in Easy Come, Easy Go (1947), a Barry Fitzgerald vehicle. It was directed by John Farrow, who also used Tufts in Blaze of Noon (1947) playing one of four brothers who fly air mail. After a cameo in Variety Girl (1947), Tufts left Paramount.

=== Freelance actor ===
He starred in a Western, The Untamed Breed (1948). He was in a film noir with John Payne, The Crooked Way (1949) where he played a ruthless villain. He received praise for his performance, with critics noting that he "work[ed] against type quite effectively". Tufts was Victor Mature's friend in Easy Living (1949) at RKO. He was arrested for public drunkenness in 1950 and 1951.

By the early 1950s, Tufts' popularity began to wane and his career began to decline. He separated from his wife in 1951 and she divorced him in 1952, saying his drinking had become "intolerable". He was unemployed for a year until he received an offer from Britain to make The Gift Horse (1952) with Richard Attenborough.

In 1953, Tufts was cast opposite Barbara Payton in the low-budget comedy film Run for the Hills. Later that year, he was in No Escape and starred in another low-budget film, Cat-Women of the Moon, which became a cult classic. He had the lead in the low-budget 1954 film Serpent Island.

=== Assaults ===
Tufts' career decline was compounded by his alcoholism and his off-screen antics. In March 1954, a stripper named Barbara Gray Atkins sued Tufts for $25,000 in damages after she claimed he bit her left thigh while his two friends and he were visiting her home. Atkins later dropped the lawsuit against Tufts.

In April 1954, a 19-year-old dancer named Margarie Von accused Tufts of biting her on the right thigh while she was relaxing aboard a yacht docked off the coast of Balboa Peninsula, Newport Beach. Von sued Tufts for $26,000, claiming the bite left a three-inch scar. Von later settled for $600. In August 1955, a third complaint was lodged against Tufts when Adrienne Fromann claimed the actor beat and bruised her at a restaurant. She demanded $20,000 in damages.

"He drinks too much and lives too lavishly", said his ex-wife Barbara.

Tufts' career briefly rebounded when he was cast in a small role in the comedy The Seven Year Itch (1955), starring Tom Ewell and Marilyn Monroe. In 1956, Tufts had a supporting role in drama Come Next Spring for Republic Pictures. He was in "A Tale of Two Citizens" for Damon Runyon Theatre (1956). After filming The Parson and the Outlaw in 1957, and being arrested for public drunkenness again, Tufts retreated to a ranch in Texas.

=== Later career ===
In 1962, he returned to Hollywood to produce and star in a film All the Way about paratroopers. It was not made.

Tufts returned to acting in 1963 with a guest appearance on The Virginian playing the father of Trampas (Doug McClure) and in a Bob Hope TV special Have Girls Will Travel (1964). He was in Town Tamer (1965) and "The Ordeal of Bud Windom" on The Loner (1965) with Lloyd Bridges and his son Jeff. His final onscreen roles were Cottonpickin' Chickenpickers (1967) and the 1968 television movie Land's End. He appeared several times as himself in Rowan & Martin's Laugh-In in 1968.

== Personal life ==
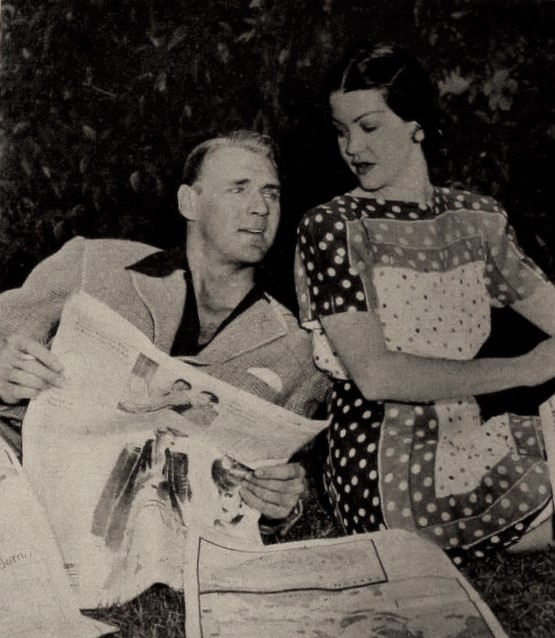
Sonny Tufts and his wife Barbara Dare, 1943

In 1938, Tufts married Spanish dancer Barbara Dare. They separated in 1949, and Dare filed for divorce in 1951, citing Tufts' excessive drinking as the reason for the breakup of their marriage. Dare was granted an interlocutory divorce on October 21, 1951 which was final the following year.

== Death ==
On June 4, 1970, Tufts died of pneumonia at age 58 at St. John's Hospital in Santa Monica, California. Tufts' private funeral was held on June 7 in Beverly Hills after which he was buried in Munroe Cemetery in Lexington, Massachusetts.

== Filmography ==
Film
Year	Title	Role	Notes
1943	So Proudly We Hail!	Kansas	
1944	Government Girl	E.H. 'Ed' Browne	
1944	I Love a Soldier	Dan Kilgore	
1944	Here Come the Waves	Windy "Pinetop" Windhurst	
1945	Bring on the Girls	Phil North	
1945	Duffy's Tavern	Sonny Tufts	Cameo role
1945	Miss Susie Slagle's	Pug Prentiss	
1946	The Virginian	Steve Andrews	
1946	The Well Groomed Bride	Lt. Torchy McNeil	
1946	Swell Guy	Jim Duncan	
1946	Cross My Heart	Oliver Clarke	
1947	Easy Come, Easy Go	Kevin O'Connor	
1947	Blaze of Noon	Roland McDonald	
1947	Variety Girl	Sonny Tufts	
1948	The Untamed Breed	Tom Kilpatrick	
1949	The Crooked Way	Vince Alexander	
1949	Easy Living	Tim "Pappy" McCarr	
1953	Glory at Sea	Ordinary Seaman 'Yank' Flanagan	Alternative title: Gift Horse
1953	Run for the Hills	Charlie Johnson	
1953	No Escape	Det. Simon Shayne	Alternative title: City on a Hunt
1953	Cat-Women of the Moon	Laird Grainger	
1954	Serpent Island	Pete Mason	
1955	The Seven Year Itch	Tom MacKenzie	
1956	Come Next Spring	Leroy Hightower	
1957	The Parson and the Outlaw	Jack Slade	Alternative titles: The Killer and 21 Men; Return of the Outlaw
1965	Town Tamer	Carmichael	
1967	Cottonpickin' Chickenpickers	Cousin Urie	

Television
Year	Title	Role	Notes
1955	Damon Runyon Theater	Sam	Episode: "A Tale of Two Citizens"
1963	The Virginian	Frank Trampas	Episode: "Ride a Dark Trail"
1964	Bob Hope Presents the Chrysler Theatre	Monk	Episode: "Have Girls, Will Travel"
1965	The Loner	Barney Windom	Segment: "The Ordeal of Bud Windom"
1965	My Mother The Car	Himself	Episode: "And Leave The Drive-In to Us"
1968	Land's End	Hal	Television movie
1968	Rowan & Martin's Laugh-In	Himself	Various Episodes
