= Garry Owen (actor) =

American actor (1902–1951)

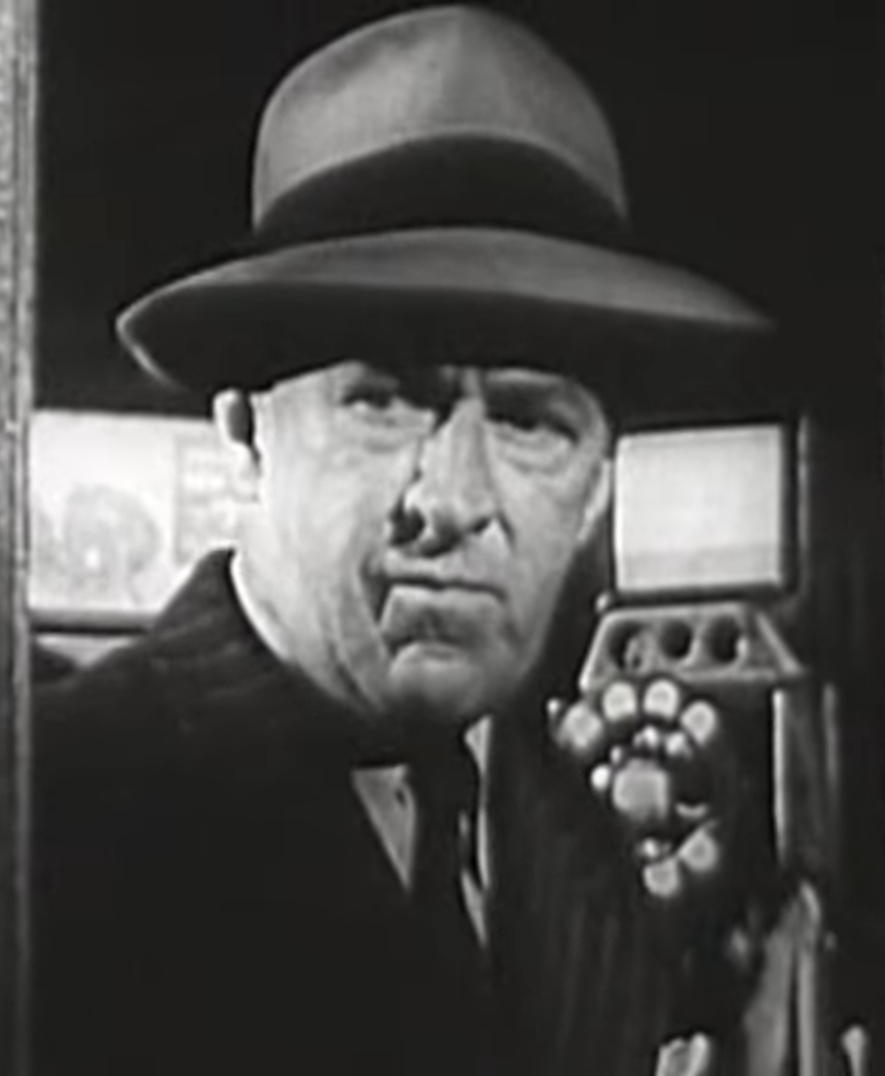
- Owen in The Admiral Was a Lady (1950)
- Born: February 18, 1902; Brookhaven, Mississippi, U.S.
- Died: June 1, 1951 (aged 49); Hollywood, California, U.S.
- Resting place: Chapel of the Pines Crematory, Los Angeles, California
- Occupation: Actor
- Years active: 1933–1952

Garry Owen (February 18, 1902 – June 1, 1951) was an American actor, best known for his role as the taxi driver in Arsenic and Old Lace. He appeared in more than 185 films between 1933 and 1952.

Owen was born in Brookhaven, Mississippi, on February 18, 1902. He died in Hollywood, California, on June 1, 1951.

== Filmography ==
Year	Title	Role	Notes
1933	Child of Manhattan	Buddy	(as Gary Owen)
1933	Hold Your Man	Slim	
1933	Flying Devils	Carnival Ticket Seller	Uncredited
1933	Knee Deep in Music		Short
1933	Stage Mother	Jerry - Stagehand	Uncredited
1933	Saturday's Millions	Football Announcer	Uncredited
1933	The Prizefighter and the Lady	Jake - Fight Promoter	Uncredited
1933	Havana Widows	Sphinx Club Croupier	Uncredited
1933	Son of a Sailor	Sailor Johnson	Uncredited
1934	Bombay Mail	Cuthbert Neal	
1934	Good Dame	Taxi Driver	Uncredited
1934	The Thin Man	Detective	Uncredited
1934	Little Miss Marker	Grinder	(as Gary Owen)
1934	The Girl from Missouri	Sailor Cupick - Kitty's Date	Uncredited
1934	Contented Calves	Breezy - Photographer	Short (as Gary Owen)
1934	Death on the Diamond	In-Studio Radio Announcer	Uncredited
1934	No Ransom	Archie DeWitt	
1934	Evelyn Prentice	Reporter #2	Uncredited
1934	The Gay Bride	Reporter	Uncredited
1935	Times Square Lady	Newspaper Reporter	Uncredited
1935	Hold 'Em Yale	Laverty	Uncredited
1935	Let 'Em Have It	Ike	Uncredited
1935	People Will Talk	Second Reporter	Uncredited
1935	Red Salute	Gas Station Attendant	Uncredited
1935	Special Agent	Carston's Henchman	Uncredited
1935	O'Shaughnessy's Boy		(scenes deleted)
1935	I Live My Life	Elevator Operator	Uncredited
1935	Top Flat	Garry, Patsy's friend	Short (as Gary Owen)
1936	Ceiling Zero	Mike Owens	
1936	Boulder Dam	Dam Worker	Uncredited
1936	The Country Doctor	Jerry	Uncredited
1936	Florida Special	Joe	
1936	Bullets or Ballots	The Spotter	Uncredited
1936	The Return of Sophie Lang	'Nosey' Schwartz	
1936	Rose Bowl	Announcer	Uncredited
1936	The Case of the Black Cat	Paul Drake	
1936	King of Hockey	Jitters McCarthy, the Referee	
1937	Devil's Playground	Radio Man	Uncredited
1937	Don't Tell the Wife	Motorcycle Policeman	Uncredited
1937	Racketeers in Exile	Sy	
1937	King of Gamblers	Fred	Uncredited
1937	San Quentin	Dopey	
1937	Bad Guy	Ned Burns - Gambler	Uncredited
1937	Double or Nothing	Process Server	Uncredited
1937	My Dear Miss Aldrich	Policeman	Uncredited
1937	This Way Please	Reporter	Uncredited
1937	You're Only Young Once	Guide	Uncredited
1937	True Confession	Tony Krauch	
1938	Start Cheering	Gas Station Attendant	Uncredited
1938	Dangerous to Know	Mike Tookey - Chauffeur	Uncredited
1938	Test Pilot	Pilot	Uncredited
1938	Wide Open Faces	Pineapple	
1938	Call of the Yukon	Conner	
1938	Men with Wings	Reporter	Uncredited
1938	The Crowd Roars	Cain's Henchman	Uncredited
1938	Heart of the North	Tom 'Tommy' Ryan	
1939	Idiot's Delight	Newsstand Vendor	Uncredited
1939	Made for Each Other	Denver Radio Operator	Uncredited
1939	Within the Law	Jenks' Associate	Uncredited
1939	You Can't Get Away with Murder	'Lock' Man - Inventor	Uncredited
1939	Lucky Night	Willie Smith - the Bandit	Uncredited
1939	Naughty but Nice	Bartender	Uncredited
1939	The Angels Wash Their Faces	Driver Whose Car Hit Sleepy	Uncredited
1939	Dust Be My Destiny	Milkman	Uncredited
1939	A Child Is Born	First Drugstore Clerk	Uncredited
1940	Women Without Names	Reporter	Uncredited
1940	Grandpa Goes to Town	Muggsy	
1940	City for Conquest	Reporter	Uncredited
1941	High Sierra	Joe - Velma's Guest	Uncredited
1941	Footsteps in the Dark	Horatio Jackson	Uncredited
1941	Meet John Doe	Sign Painter	Uncredited
1941	The Devil and Miss Jones	Drug Store Clerk	Uncredited
1941	The Wagons Roll at Night	Gus	
1941	Affectionately Yours	Taxi Driver	Uncredited
1941	Blondie in Society	The Carpenter	Uncredited
1941	Here Comes the Cavalry	Sergeant Hooker	Short
1941	You'll Never Get Rich	Robert's Guard	Uncredited
1941	Sailors on Leave	Thompson	
1941	Appointment for Love	Reporter	Uncredited
1942	Yankee Doodle Dandy	Army Clerk	Uncredited
1942	Lady in a Jam	Man	Uncredited
1942	The Pride of the Yankees	Scorecard Vendor	Uncredited
1942	The Gay Sisters	Elevator Repairman	Voice, uncredited
1942	A Night to Remember	Mailman	Uncredited
1943	Slightly Dangerous	Detective	Uncredited
1943	Watch on the Rhine	Taxi Driver	Uncredited
1943	Whistling in Brooklyn	Taxi Driver #2	Uncredited
1943	The Woman of the Town	Alhambra Dealer	Uncredited
1944	Timber Queen	Taxi Cab Driver	Uncredited
1944	Andy Hardy's Blonde Trouble	Taxi Driver #3	Uncredited
1944	Once Upon a Time	Man Spouting Poetry	Uncredited
1944	Song of the Open Road	Assistant Director	Uncredited
1944	Arsenic and Old Lace	Taxi Driver	
1944	Something for the Boys	Corporal O'Neill	Uncredited
1944	The Thin Man Goes Home	Pool Player	Uncredited
1944	Nothing But Trouble	Clerk	Uncredited
1944	Music for Millions	Soldier Waiter	Uncredited
1945	Roughly Speaking	Barber	Uncredited
1945	Without Love	Soldier	Uncredited
1945	The Clock	Bus Fare Collector	Uncredited
1945	The Last Installment	Jake	Short, Uncredited
1945	The Phantom Speaks	Louis Fabian	
1945	Honeymoon Ahead	Announcer	Uncredited
1945	Captain Eddie	Reporter	Uncredited
1945	Anchors Aweigh	2nd Soldier at USO	Uncredited
1945	Incendiary Blonde	Garry - Dance Director	Uncredited
1945	Ziegfeld Follies	1st Subway Policeman	('Limehouse Blues'), Uncredited
1945	Mildred Pierce	Policeman on Pier	Uncredited
1945	Week-End at the Waldorf	Taxi Driver	Uncredited
1945	Abbott and Costello in Hollywood	Director's Assistant	Uncredited
1945	Fallen Angel	Waiter	Uncredited
1945	The Tiger Woman	Bartender	
1945	Adventure	Jabbo	Unconfirmed
1946	Up Goes Maisie	Elevator Operator	Uncredited
1946	A Letter for Evie	Fireman	Uncredited
1946	Idea Girl	Howard	Uncredited
1946	Crime of the Century	Taxi Driver	
1946	The Hoodlum Saint	Cop Arresting Snarp at Poolroom	Uncredited
1946	The Postman Always Rings Twice	Truck Driver	Uncredited
1946	Our Hearts Were Growing Up	Bellboy	Uncredited
1946	Night and Day	Joer	Uncredited
1946	Courage of Lassie	Cook Swenson - Sailor helping Smitty	Uncredited
1946	Notorious	Motorcycle Policeman	Uncredited
1946	The Missing Lady	Johnson	(scenes deleted)
1946	The Killers	Joe Smalley	Uncredited
1946	Two Years Before the Mast	Rough Sailor	Uncredited
1946	Three Wise Fools		Uncredited
1946	No Leave, No Love	Military Policeman at Union Station	Uncredited
1946	The Dark Mirror	Franklin	(as Gary Owen)
1946	Lady Chaser	Herman	
1946	Gallant Bess	'Doc' the Pharmacist Mate	Uncredited
1946	Swell Guy	Ernie - the Cab Driver	Uncredited
1946	It's a Wonderful Life	Bill-Poster	Uncredited
1947	Blondie's Big Moment	Cab Driver	Uncredited
1947	Dead Reckoning	Reporter	Uncredited
1947	My Brother Talks to Horses	The Chestnut's Handler	Uncredited
1947	My Favorite Brunette	Reporter	Uncredited
1947	Millie's Daughter	Ticket Agent	Uncredited
1947	It Happened on 5th Avenue	Detective	Uncredited
1947	The Long Night	Library Lecturer	Uncredited
1947	That's My Man	Worker	Uncredited
1947	The Bachelor and the Bobby-Soxer	Tom - Cop at Airport	Uncredited
1947	Driftwood	Gas Station Attendant	Uncredited
1947	Magic Town	Cigar Counter Clerk	Uncredited
1947	The Flame	Detective	
1947	It Had to Be You	Second Cab Driver	Uncredited
1948	I Love Trouble	Gus	Uncredited
1948	My Girl Tisa	Policeman	Uncredited
1948	The Bride Goes Wild	Joe	(scenes deleted)
1948	The Inside Story	Jim - Bank Teller	Uncredited
1948	Here Comes Trouble	Sports Editor	Uncredited
1948	The Big Clock	Cab Driver	Uncredited
1948	State of the Union	Brooklynite	Uncredited
1948	Money Madness	Vance - Reporter	Uncredited
1948	On an Island with You	Reporter	Uncredited
1948	The Fuller Brush Man	Creamy	Uncredited
1948	The Checkered Coat	Prince	
1948	A Southern Yankee	Confederate Soldier	Uncredited
1948	Sorry, Wrong Number	Bingo Caller	Uncredited
1948	Good Sam	Taxi Driver	Uncredited
1948	The Return of October	Charlie	Uncredited
1948	Let's Live a Little	Elevator-Starter	Uncredited
1949	Criss Cross	Johnny	Uncredited
1949	Act of Violence	Auto Rental Co. Attendant	Uncredited
1949	Knock on Any Door	Larry - Barber	Uncredited
1949	I Cheated the Law	Jerry	
1949	The Life of Riley	Bill Collector	Uncredited
1949	The Stratton Story	Cab Driver	Uncredited
1949	The Crooked Way	Man from Green Acres Mortuary	
1949	Flamingo Road	Mailman	Uncredited
1949	Manhandled	Police Photographer	Uncredited
1949	Too Late for Tears	Police Officer at Switchboard	Uncredited
1949	Mighty Joe Young	Second Bartender	Uncredited
1949	The Doctor and the Girl	Patient	Uncredited
1949	Bride for Sale	Al	Uncredited
1949	A Kiss for Corliss	Cop at Archers	Uncredited
1950	The Flying Saucer	Bartender at Ernie's	
1950	The File on Thelma Jordon	Bailiff	Uncredited
1950	The Good Humor Man	Elevator Starter	Uncredited
1950	The Yellow Cab Man	Demolition Engineer	Uncredited
1950	Ma and Pa Kettle Go to Town	Bubble-ola Delivery Man	Uncredited
1950	Riding High	Harry	Uncredited
1950	The Admiral Was a Lady	Watson Jones (private detective)	
1950	The Milkman	Irving	
1951	Two Tickets to Broadway	Bus Passenger Behind Sailor	Uncredited
1952	Scandal Sheet	Bum in Heeney's Bar	Uncredited, (final film role)
