= Lester Dorr =

American actor (1893–1980)

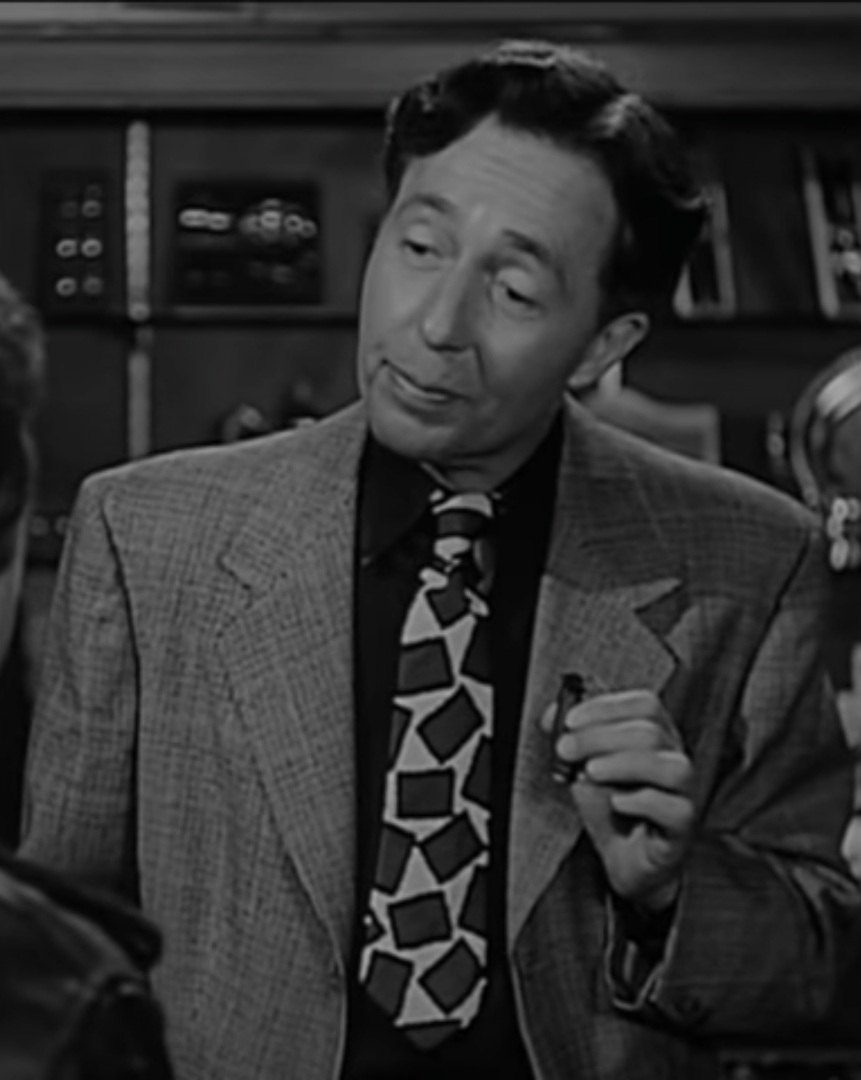
- Dorr in Quicksand (1950)
- Born: Harry Lester Dorr; May 8, 1893; Cambridge, Massachusetts, U.S.
- Died: August 25, 1980 (aged 87); Los Angeles, California, U.S.
- Occupation: Actor
- Years active: 1917–1975
- Spouse: Grace L. Painter (m. 1920)

Harry Lester Dorr (May 8, 1893 – August 25, 1980) was an American actor who between 1917 and 1975 appeared in well over 500 productions on stage, in feature films and shorts, and in televised plays and weekly series.

Even a sampling from his extensive filmography attests to his versatility as a supporting actor and his reliability as a bit player. His roles are at times credited, but more often they are uncredited, consisting of peripheral characters who have limited dialogue or appear briefly in a wide range of occupations such as newspaper reporters, hotel clerks and bellhops, taxi drivers, salesmen, police officers, military personnel, waiters, and bartenders.

== Early life and stage work ==
Harry Lester Dorr was born in Massachusetts in 1893, the oldest of 11 children of Mary E. (née McGinnis) and Edward Peter Dorr. Documents in Cambridge record that Dorr was born there, but his parents soon moved to the nearby town of Lynn, where his father worked as a shoemaker or "laster". By 1900, the growing Dorr family moved from Lynn into Boston. Little more is known about Lester's early life until 1917, when the United States entered World War I and Dorr registered for the military draft. He was living then in Chicago, and on his registration papers he identified his occupation as "Theatre Producer", indicating that he was already involved in or was pursuing a career in entertainment by that time. Dorr's identification of himself, however, as a producer might be attributed to youthful exaggeration or was an unrealized intention, for no subsequent references have been found that credit him or even mention him in that behind-the-scenes occupation during his career.

Dorr married in 1920 and during the late 1920s—before moving to California to act in films—he worked in stage productions in New York, including in Broadway dramas and musicals. He performed, for example, assorted roles in the 1927 revue Rufus LeMaire's Affairs; and the following year he portrayed Captain DeJean in the operetta The New Moon, which premiered at the Imperial Theatre in Manhattan on September 19, 1928.

== Films ==
The federal census of 1930 documents that Dorr was in Los Angeles by April that year, working there as an "actor/motion pictures" and residing in a rental house with his wife and mother-in-law. He soon was cast in two Hollywood comedy shorts, both released by Pathé Exchange (RKO) in 1930: All Stuck Up and Ride 'em Cowboy. For the remainder of the 1930s, Dorr demonstrated his abilities at portraying an array of characters, such as hotel clerks, police officers, reporters, office workers, elevator operators, salesmen, bank employees, cowboys, mob henchmen, prisoners, truck drivers, train crewmen, soldiers, sailors, and hospital personnel. He was cast, often under contract as a "day player", in more than 250 films in just the 1930s alone, remarkably averaging a different role in a different film every two weeks for ten straight years. Even a small sample of those motion pictures includes Riders of the Purple Sage, Union Depot, Central Airport, Helldorado, The Mighty Barnum, Murder in the Clouds, The Case of the Missing Man, Show Them No Mercy!, She Gets Her Man, Love Before Breakfast, Sinner Take All, Snowed Under, The Firefly, Expensive Husbands, Big City, Criminals of the Air, Dangerous Holiday, It's All Yours, Captains Courageous, Missing Witnesses, Pardon Our Nerve, The Cisco Kid and the Lady, Test Pilot, Penitentiary, The Main Event, The Crowd Roars, Coast Guard, Sued for Libel, Gone with the Wind, and Mr. Smith Goes to Washington. He also performed in several installments of the 1939 serial Mandrake the Magician, portraying Gray, one of many criminals battling the title character.

Dorr continued to appear regularly in studio productions throughout the 1940s, but with reduced frequency when compared to the preceding decade; nevertheless, he still added more than 140 Hollywood films to his résumé in that decade. His work on the "big screen" decreased even further in the 1950s as acting opportunities increased on television. He was, though, cast in at least 45 feature films and shorts during the 1950s, including small roles in some notable productions, such as Ace in the Hole, The Greatest Show in Earth, and East of Eden. In another, far more modest film-noir production from that period, Quicksand, Dorr portrays "Baldy", a smooth-talking jeweler. His on-screen sales pitch in that role, in which he convinces the story's leading character Dan (Mickey Rooney) to buy a wristwatch, is typical of the concise, quick-study performances that defined Dorr's career and made him so popular in cost-conscious studio casting offices. Dorr's film work, however, began to draw to a close by the 1960s, when he served in bit parts in only five films. Then, in 1975, he appeared in his final role, playing a doorman in the musical romantic comedy At Long Last Love.

== Television ==
By the late 1940s and early 1950s, programming in the rapidly expanding medium of television attracted the talents of many experienced personnel in the film industry, including Dorr. His earliest work on television was in two 1951 episodes of the televised crime drama Boston Blackie, starring Kent Taylor. Dorr's supporting role as Tommy in an episode of that series titled "Blind Beggar" is formally credited, although his other role in "Oil Field Murder" is uncredited. As with his film career, Dorr's 15 years of being cast in television series consisted predominantly of brief appearances on screen and portraying characters who had relatively few lines. Yet, his characterizations on television, like in films, were highly diverse and can be seen in at least 84 episodes of Westerns, crime and detective series, courtroom and hospital dramas, adventure programs, and sitcoms of the period.

Examples of Dorr's television appearances can be viewed today in video copies of full episodes from classic series, as well as clips from related productions that are available online. Among those are his performances on Bat Masterson in 1960 (as a murdered Land Office Clerk in "Six Feet of Gold"), and on The Jack Benny Program in 1961. In a sketch in an episode titled "Main Street Shelter", he plays a weathered, finicky "patron" of a homeless shelter who complains that the facility has only doughnuts as free snacks and stresses his preference for cinnamon buns and crullers. Five years after that appearance on The Jack Benny Program and subsequent work on several other series, Dorr made his last television performance on the sitcom Green Acres in "I Didn't Raise My Pig to Be a Soldier". He has a considerable speaking part in that episode as "Mr. Collins", a local draft board official.

== Personal life and death ==
Dorr was married to Grace L. Painter, a native of Louisiana, Missouri. They were wed in Lucas, Ohio, on June 28, 1920 and remained together for 60 years, until Lester's death in Los Angeles in 1980. His remains were cremated, and his ashes were scattered at sea.

== Selected filmography ==
As noted in his career profile, Dorr performed in hundreds of productions on stage, in films, and on television. The following is a sampling from a list of his screen appearances that is available in the catalog of the American Film Institute (AFI) in Los Angeles. Even that entire AFI list constitutes only a partial accounting of Dorr's performances:

- All Stuck Up (1930), short (uncredited)
- Ride 'Em Cowboy (1930), short) (uncredited)
- Newly Rich (1931), feature (uncredited
- Riders of the Purple Sage (1931) as Judkins
- Union Depot (1932) as sailor (uncredited)
- The Death Kiss (1932) as hotel desk clerk (uncredited)
- Central Airport (1933) as desk clerk (uncredited)
- Helldorado (1934) as newspaper reporter (uncredited)
- The Mighty Barnum (1934) as hotel bellhop (uncredited)
- Desirable (1934) as head usher (uncredited)
- Upperworld (1934) as steward (uncredited)
- A Modern Hero (1934) as chauffeur (uncredited)
- Murder in the Clouds (1934) as assistant (uncredited)
- Housewife (1934) as chauffeur (uncredited)
- Name the Woman (1934) as reporter (uncredited)
- Front Page Woman (1935) as waiter (uncredited)
- Show Them No Mercy! (1935) as milkman (uncredited)
- The Case of the Missing Man (1935) as reporter
- Metropolitan (1935) as press agent (uncredited)
- She Gets Her Man (1935) as photographer (uncredited)
- Postal Inspector (1936) as truck driver (uncredited)
- Sinner Take All (1936) as reporter (uncredited)
- Crash Donovan (1936) as patrolman (uncredited)
- Captains Courageous (1937) as steward (uncredited)
- It's All Yours (1937) as taxi driver (uncredited)
- Criminals of the Air (1937) as Trigger
- Speed to Spare (1937) as Otto Behrman
- Big City (1937) as petty officer (uncredited)
- Hollywood Cowboy (1937) as Joe Garvey
- Expensive Husbands (1937) as reporter (uncredited)
- Sea Racketeers (1937) as sailor (uncredited)
- The Firefly (1937) as French officer
- The Crowd Roars (1938) as photographer (uncredited)
- Mr. Moto's Gamble (1938) as reporter (uncredited)
- Test Pilot (1938) as pilot (uncredited)
- Sunset Murder Case (1938) as editor (uncredited)
- Three Loves Has Nancy (1938) as news vendor (uncredited)
- The Main Event (1938) as Buck
- Sweethearts (1938) as dance director
- Exposed (1938) as Slim (uncredited)
- Cafe Society (1939) as waiter (uncredited)
- North of Shanghai (1939) as Wycoff
- It’s a Wonderful World (1939) as photographer (uncredited)
- Behind Prison Gates (1939) as Floyd
- Pop Always Pays (1940) as auto salesman (uncredited)
- Sailor's Lady (1940) as assistant paymaster (uncredited)
- Danger Ahead (1940) as Lefty
- Military Academy (1940) as reporter (uncredited)
- Mexican Spitfire Out West (1940) as Harry
- The Secret Seven (1940) as Racketeer
- Blossoms in the Dust (1941) as court attendant
- I Wanted Wings (1941) as evaluating officer (uncredited)
- Meet the Chump (1941) as taxi driver (uncredited)
- Model Wife (1941) as waiter (uncredited)
- South of Panama (1941) as Joe
- You Belong to Me (1941) as photographer (uncredited)
- The People vs. Dr. Kildare (1941) as onlooker (uncredited)
- Under Age (1941) as Pearson
- The Reluctant Dragon (1941) as camera operator
- Three Girls About Town (1941) as reporter (uncredited)
- Babes on Broadway (1941) as writer (uncredited)
- Remember the Day (1941) as photographer (uncredited)
- A Tragedy at Midnight (1942) as waiter (uncredited)
- The Pride of the Yankees (1942) as disappointed fan (uncredited)
- Pardon My Stripes (1942) as bookie (uncredited)
- Blue, White and Perfect (1942) as porter (uncredited)
- Alias Boston Blackie (1942) as clerk (uncredited)
- Sabotage Squad (1942) as Harry
- Sleepytime Gal (1942) as reporter (uncredited)
- Little Tokyo, U.S.A. (1942) as clerk (uncredited)
- Stand By All Networks (1942) as bartender
- Sunday Punch (1942) as cameraman
- Hitler's Madman (1943) as sergeant
- A Stranger in Town (1943) as electric man (uncredited)
- Destroyer (1943) as shipfitter (uncredited)
- The Imposter (1944) as soldier (uncredited)
- Enemy of Women (1944) as Hanussen
- Shadow of Suspicion (1944) as reporter (uncredited)
- Hi, Beautiful (1944) as train conductor (uncredited)
- Henry Aldrich's Little Secret (1944) as Joe
- Four Jills in a Jeep (1944) as soldier
- Anchors Aweigh (1945) as assistant director (uncredited)
- Life with Blondie (1945) as John
- Duffy's Tavern (1945) as painter (uncredited)
- That Brennan Girl (1946) as apartment clerk (uncredited)
- Notorious (1946) as motorcycle officer (uncredited)
- The Shadow Returns (1946) as William Monk
- Bowery Bombshell (1946) as Feather-Fingers
- G.I. War Brides (1946) as steward
- Swell Guy (1946) as farmer
- The Perils of Pauline (1947) as reporter
- California (1947) as Mike, the dealer
- Roses Are Red (1947) as reporter (uncredited)
- Blaze of Noon (1947) as Sam
- Night Has a Thousand Eyes (1948) as Byers
- Cass Timberlane (1948) as salesman
- The Countess of Monte Cristo (1948) as clerk
- Music Man (1948) as mailman (uncredited)
- Beyond Glory (1948) as sergeant
- April Showers (1948) as hotel clerk (uncredited)
- The Big Clock (1948) as cab driver
- Whispering Smith (1948) as railroad brakeman
- Tell It to the Judge (1949) as incoming reporter
- Red, Hot and Blue (1949) as drugstore manager
- Without Honor (1949) as neighbor
- The Heiress (1949) as groom (uncredited)
- Alias Nick Beal (1949) as commercial fisherman
- Samson and Delilah (1949) as victim (uncredited)
- The Blonde Bandit (1950) as ticket taker
- Three Secrets (1950) as houseman
- Where Danger Lives (1950) as assistant police chief
- Copper Canyon (1950) as guard (uncredited)
- Covered Wagon Raid (1950) as Bartender Pete
- Quicksand (1950) as Baldy
- I'll Get By (1950) as song plugger (uncredited)
- The Big Hangover (1950) as waiter (uncredited)
- The Strip (1951) as police surgeon
- Follow the Sun (1951) as attendant
- No Questions Asked (1951) as elevator operator (uncredited)
- Ace in the Hole (1951) as priest
- The Law and the Lady (1951) as newspaperman (uncredited)
- The Redhead and the Cowboy (1951) as Ugly One
- Night Riders of Montana (1951) as drummer
- Somebody Loves Me (1952) as waiter (uncredited)
- Bonzo Goes to College (1952) as mailman (uncredited)
- The Greatest Show on Earth (1952) as circus barker
- Abbott and Costello Go to Mars (1953) as customer (uncredited)
- Take the High Ground! (1953) as army doctor (uncredited)
- Run for the Hills (1953) as Reporter
- The Adventures of Superman (1953) uncredited
- Killers from Space (1954) as gas station attendant
- The Human Jungle (1954) as salesman
- 3 Ring Circus (1954) as seedy character
- Seven Angry Men (1955) as Thoreau (uncredited)
- East of Eden (1955) as city official at parade (uncredited)
- The Girl Rush (1955) as carnival member
- The First Traveling Saleslady (1956) as salesman
- Marjorie Morningstar (1958) as elevator operator (uncredited)
- Hot Rod Gang (1958) as Dryden Philpot
- Missile Monsters (1958) as Crane
- Arson for Hire (1959) as cab dispatcher
- Take a Giant Step (1959) as high-school janitor (uncredited)
- Vice Raid (1959) as man at desk
- Inherit the Wind (1960) as John
- Hotel (1967) as elevator operator
- Hello Dolly! (1969) as workman (uncredited)
- At Long Last Love (1975) as doorman
