= The Parson and the Outlaw =

1957 film

- Theatrical release poster
- Directed by: Oliver Drake
- Written by: Oliver Drake; John Mantley
- Produced by: Charles "Buddy" Rogers
- Starring: Anthony Dexter; Sonny Tufts; Marie Windsor
- Cinematography: Clark Ramsey
- Edited by: Warren Adams
- Music by: Joe Sodja
- Production company: Charles "Buddy" Rogers Productions
- Distributed by: Columbia Pictures
- Release date: September 1957
- Running time: 71 minutes
- Country: United States
- Language: English

The Parson and the Outlaw is a 1957 American Western film directed by Oliver Drake for Charles "Buddy" Rogers Productions and distributed by Columbia Pictures. Written by Drake and John Mantley, the film stars Anthony Dexter as Billy the Kid, along with Charles "Buddy" Rogers, Sonny Tufts, Marie Windsor and Jean Parker. This was the final screen appearance by Rogers before his retirement from films.

== Plot ==
Billy the Kid tries to live in peace under a new name in a frontier town, but he is soon approached by a preacher who asks for his help in freeing the town from the ruthless Colonel Morgan and his gunman Jack Slade.

== Cast ==
- Anthony Dexter as Billy the Kid
- Sonny Tufts as Jack Slade
- Marie Windsor as Tonya
- Charles "Buddy" Rogers as Reverend Jericho Jones
- Jean Parker as Sarah Jones
- Robert Lowery as Colonel Jefferson Morgan
- Bob Steele as Ace Jardine (erroneously credited as Bob Steel)
- Bob Duncan as Marshall Pat Garrett
- Joe Sodja as Ben, the Balladeer

== Release ==
The Parson and the Outlaw was commercially released in the United States in September 1957.
