= Government Girl =

1943 film by Dudley Nichols

- Theatrical release poster
- Directed by: Dudley Nichols
- Written by: Budd Schulberg (adaptation)
- Screenplay by: Dudley Nichols
- Story by: Adela Rogers St. Johns
- Based on: Government Girl; 1943 story in Ladies Home Journal by Adela Rogers St. Johns
- Produced by: Dudley Nichols
- Starring: Olivia de Havilland; Sonny Tufts
- Cinematography: Frank Redman
- Edited by: Roland Gross
- Music by: C. Bakaleinikoff (music director); Leigh Harline
- Production company: RKO Radio Pictures
- Distributed by: RKO Radio Pictures
- Release date: November 5, 1943 (USA)
- Running time: 94 minutes
- Country: United States
- Language: English
- Budget: $700,000
- Box office: $1.1 million (US rentals)

Government Girl is a 1943 American romantic-comedy film, produced and directed by Dudley Nichols and starring Olivia de Havilland and Sonny Tufts. Based on a story by Adela Rogers St. Johns, and written by Dudley Nichols and Budd Schulberg, the film is about a secretary working in Washington for the war administration during World War II who helps her boss navigate the complex political machinations of government in an effort to build bomber aircraft for the war effort.

== Plot ==
Automobile engineer Ed Browne comes to Washington to appear in front of the War Construction Board. His mission is to supervise the building of bomber aircraft for the war. But when he arrives at the crowded hotel he is supposed to stay at, there are no rooms available. A friendly clerk at the hotel recognizes him from the paper and offers him room 2A.

Ed is unaware that the same room is reserved by Elizabeth "Smokey" Allard for her friend May who will marry an army sergeant, Joe Bates, that very night. The wedding takes place in the hotel lobby, but the groom has lost his ring, and Smokey borrows one from Ed, which leads him to believe that Smokey is the woman getting married. A series of unfortunate events that night leads to Joe being arrested by M.P.s, and he leaves a borrowed motorcycle behind in the hands of Smokey.

Smokey tries to find someone who can return the bike, and Ed happens to pass by on his way to the War Construction Board. When Smokey tells him she works at the board, he agrees to drive her there. It turns out Ed is Smokey's new boss. He learns that she is dating a man named Dana McGuire, who is an adviser to Senator MacVickers. Dana soon proves to be too egoistical and ambitious for Smokey's taste.

When Ed announces his plan to make the aircraft factories more effective, producing double the amount of bombers each year, Smokey warns him not to stray too far off government recommendations. He ignores her warning, and goes ahead with his efficiency plan. When six months have passed, Ed has reached his goal, but he has also made enemies. One of them is C. L. Harvester, who has become a thorn in his side because of the way Ed has ignored government procedures, and cutting into Harvester's business earnings. The two men become bitter enemies.

Harvester soon teams up with Dana, the senator, and powerful Washington socialite Adele Wright, threatening Ed with a Senate investigation. Ed has enough trouble with personal issues, realizing that he has fallen for Smokey, while she has already received a proposal from Dana.

Smokey, however, by burning the information Harvester has brought to Dana, saves Ed's career. When her friend May sees this, she claims that Smokey has fallen in love with Ed. The two women then are recruited by the government to expose Count Bodinsky as a spy. The mission is successful, with the files that Ed was suspected of stealing being returned to Dana the following day by Smokey. She also testifies on Ed's behalf at the hearing. Ed is off the hook, and follows Smokey home to propose to her.

== Cast ==
As appearing in Government Girl, (main roles and screen credits identified):

- Olivia de Havilland as Elizabeth "Smokey" Allard
- Sonny Tufts as E.H. "Ed" Browne
- Anne Shirley as May Harness Blake
- Jess Barker as Dana McGuire
- James Dunn as Sergeant Joe Bates
- Paul Stewart as Branch Owens
- Agnes Moorehead as Adele, Mrs. Delancey Wright
- Harry Davenport as Senator MacVickers
- Una O'Connor as Mrs. Harris
- Sig Ruman as Ambassador
- Paul Stanton as C.L. Harvester
- George Givot as Count Bodinsky

The three actors in the scene, Tufts, de Havilland and Moorehead all had contrasting styles, with the "wooden" male lead being easily outdone by his female co-stars.

== Production ==
While in pre-production, Government Girl went through numerous changes in casting and production personnel. Joseph Cotten was originally slated for the male lead, with Gladys George to play "Mrs. Wright." Both Barbara Stanwyck and Ginger Rogers turned down the role of Elizabeth, and Olivia de Havilland was cast. David Hempstead was initially scheduled to produce the film, but when he had to bow out because of scheduling conflicts, Dudley Nichols stepped in, in his first film where he was both director and producer. Sonny Tufts, borrowed from Paramount to star, was paired with Olivia de Havilland, who had run into studio politics at Warner Bros. on her last feature, Princess O'Rourke (1943) that had resulted in first, her suspension, and subsequent "assignment" by studio boss Jack L. Warner to producer David O. Selznick in return for Ingrid Bergman, whom Warner cast in Casablanca (1942). Selznick, in turn, loaned de Havilland to RKO.

Considering her ongoing lawsuit against her studio was the reason for her being punished with her assignment to Government Girl, she was vociferous that she did not enjoy the experience. (Note: After the strain of working on her last feature film at Warner Bros., de Havilland would eventually sue the studio in a landmark case, known as the de Havilland Law (California Labor Code Section 2855), that set a seven-year limit on studio-player contracts.)

Principal photography on Government Girl took place between mid-June to August 4, 1943, with retakes on August 11–18. Although the film was basically a studio production, second unit director Russell Metty filmed backgrounds in Washington, D.C.

== Reception ==
Despite reservations by de Havilland, Government Girl was a moderate success, making a profit of $700,000.

Critical reviews, however, were quick to point out that other wartime Washington-themed films were better. Bosley Crowther in The New York Times praised Nichols as a "first-class screen-writer" but as a director, "In some spots, his film is amusing. In long stretches, it is hopelessly dull." He also found, "the plot takes such sudden twists and sideslips, the pace is so uneven, the styles are so jumbled and the story, by and large, is so topically stale that the film has the look of an effort of a directorial amateur."

The Monthly Film Bulletin wrote: "The story is the most disappointing part of this film. It never gets to grips with the actualities of its setting or its basic plot problems, and its climax in the speech to the Senators rings as falsely as anything could. Directorially, however, Nichols scores with his handling of the broad farce which is the film's chief attraction. He evokes from Olivia de Havilland a gusto and comic ability which marks this as quite one of her better performances. Sonny Tufts is ruggedly attractive as the 'plane-producer."
