= Blaze of Noon =

1947 film by John Farrow

- Theatrical film poster
- Directed by: John Farrow
- Screenplay by: Frank Wead; Arthur Sheekman
- Based on: novel by Ernest K. Gann
- Produced by: Robert Fellows
- Starring: Anne Baxter; William Holden; Sonny Tufts; William Bendix; Sterling Hayden; Howard da Silva
- Cinematography: William C. Mellor
- Edited by: Eda Warren
- Music by: Adolph Deutsch
- Production company: Paramount Pictures
- Distributed by: Paramount Pictures
- Release date: March 4, 1947
- Running time: 91 minutes
- Country: United States
- Language: English
- Box office: $1,850,000

Blaze of Noon is a 1947 aviation adventure film directed by John Farrow and based on writer and aviator Ernest K. Gann's best-selling novel Blaze of Noon (1946), a story about early air mail operations. The screenplay was from well-known writer and aviator Frank "Spig" Wead and Arthur Sheekman and starred Anne Baxter, William Holden, Sonny Tufts and William Bendix.

== Plot ==
Early in the 1920s, the four McDonald brothers are performing in a carnival as a stunt flying team, when they are hired by Mercury Airlines in Newark, New Jersey, to haul the national air mail for the US Air Mail Service.

One of the brothers, Colin (William Holden), instantly falls in love with Lucille Stewart (Anne Baxter), the nurse giving him a physical. After less than a day, he proposes and she accepts. They marry and Colin starts flying for the company along the East Coast. Lucille soon becomes irritated by the brothers' extreme dedication to their work, but Colin promises that his efforts will make it possible for them to buy a home.

When the youngest McDonald, Keith (Johnny Sands), crashes his aircraft and dies, Ronald (Sonny Tufts) feels guilty over causing his brother's death, since he was the one who taught him to fly. He quits the air and becomes a car salesman. When their friend and colleague "Porkie" (William Bendix) is fired for flying recklessly over a passenger train, he also turns to selling cars.

The next brother to crash is Tad (Sterling Hayden). Even though he survives, he is unable to fly again.

Colin's former girlfriend, Poppy (Jean Wallace), pays him a visit and tries to win him back, but he stays true to Lucille. Soon afterwards, their first child, a son, is born. Colin has promised to stop flying once he becomes a father, but when he is offered a raise by the company, he still continues to . During his first passenger flight, the wings ice over, and Colin crashes and dies. Colin's boss and Tad are the ones who have to break the news to Lucille, who is hosting their housewarming party. She decides to name her son Keith.

== Cast ==
- Anne Baxter as Lucille Stewart
- William Holden as Colin McDonald
- Sonny Tufts as Ronald McDonald (Note: The character's name is referred to as "Roland" and is listed as such in some sources.)
- William Bendix as "Porkie"
- Sterling Hayden as Tad McDonald
- Howard Da Silva as Gafferty
- Johnny Sands as Keith McDonald
- Jean Wallace as Poppy
- Edith King as Mrs. Murphy
- Lloyd Corrigan as Reverend Polly
- Dick Hogan as Sydney
- Will Wright as Mr. Thomas
- Lester Dorr as Sam

== Production ==
Spirited flying by Paul Mantz was one of the highlights of the film.

In pre-production, director John Farrow gathered research by flying on American Airlines' cargo flights. Principal photography for Blaze of Noon took place at both Paramount Studios and the Paramount Ranch, beginning on November 1, 1946, and ending in early January 1947.

Noted Hollywood movie pilot Paul Mantz flew a Pitcairn Mailwing in the film; he also served as the aerial coordinator. The film was able to gain national and international notoriety when Mantz flew his war-surplus North American P-51C Mustang fighter that he named "Blaze of Noon" to a first-place finish in the 1946 Bendix Trophy cross-country air race.

== Reception ==
Although Blaze of Noon could have been dismissed as out-of-date and more 1930s than 1940s fare, Bosley Crowther noted in his favourable review in The New York Times, "... youthful filmgoers who were mere babes in Lindbergh's salad days (and we were talking to a youngster recently who didn't even know who Lindbergh was) will probably find this aerial romance an agreeably entertaining thing."

== See also ==
- Sterling Hayden filmography
