= Peter and Oliver Tufts House =

Historic house in Massachusetts, United States

- U.S. National Register of Historic Places
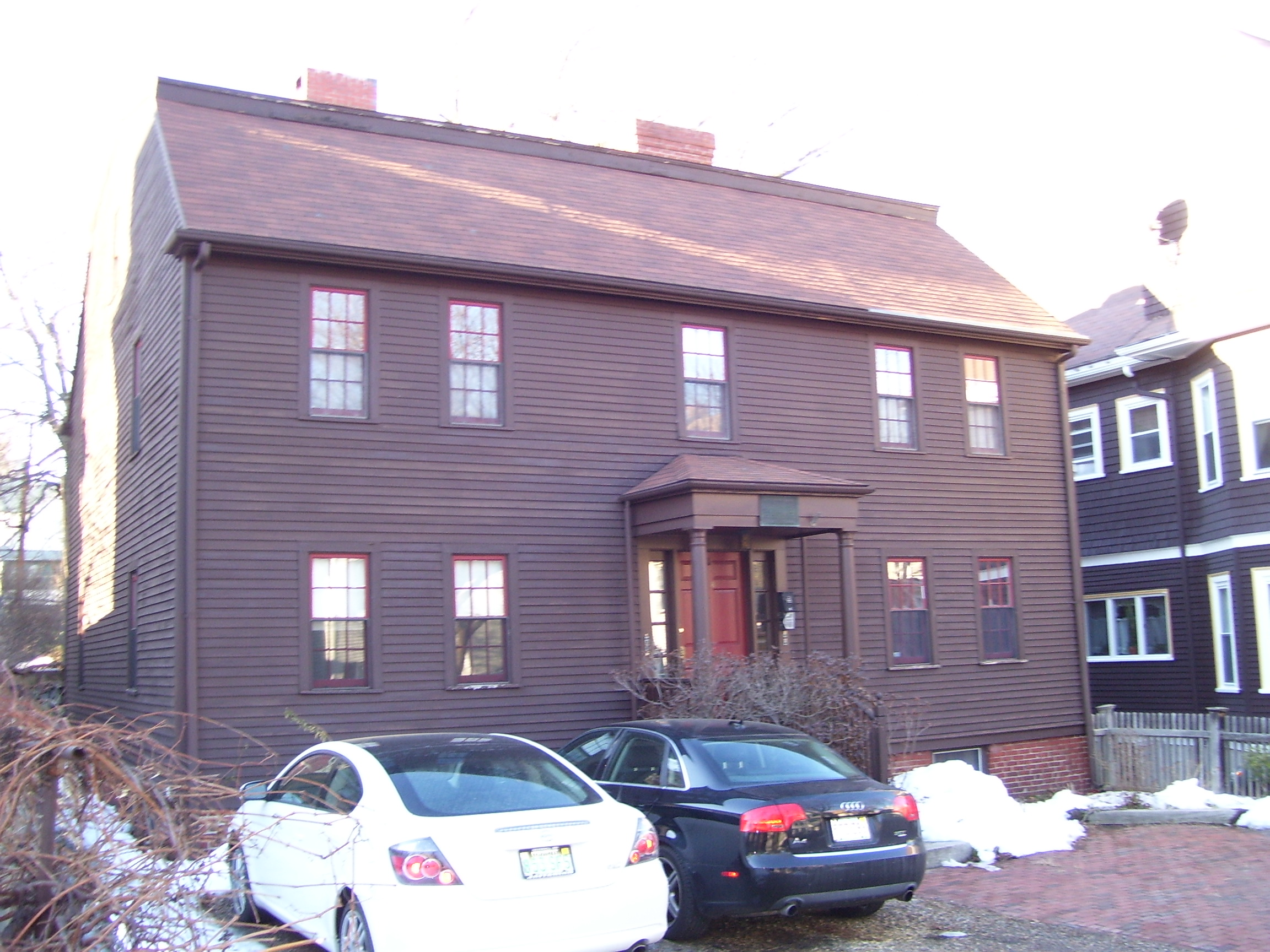

- Location within Massachusetts Location within the United States
- Location: 78 Sycamore Street, Somerville, Massachusetts
- Coordinates: 42°23′27″N 71°6′0″W
- Built: c. 1714
- Architectural style: Georgian
- MPS: Somerville MPS
- NRHP reference No.: 89001287
- Added to NRHP: September 18, 1989

The Peter and Oliver Tufts House (also known as the Peter Tufts House) is a historic house in Somerville, Massachusetts. Built about 1714, it is one of the oldest houses in the city's Winter Hill neighborhood, and was owned in the 19th century by members of the Tufts family responsible for developing the city's brickyards. The building was added to the National Register of Historic Places in 1989.

== Description and history ==
The Tufts House is located on the west side of Sycamore Street, a residential street running north–south between Medford Street and Highland Avenue on the southwest side of Winter Hill. The house is a 2 1/2-story wood-frame structure, five bays wide, with a gambrel roof, two chimneys, and clapboard siding. Its main facade faces east, and is symmetrically arranged, with a center entrance sheltered by an Italianate hood with heavy brackets.

The oldest part of the house was built around 1714. The house "was originally built on Barberry Lane (Highland Ave.)" From 1775 to 1776, the house served as headquarters for General Charles Lee of the Continental Army during the siege of Boston. It was acquired in 1778 by Peter Tufts, grandson of the Peter Tufts who emigrated to America in 1646, and who operated a ferry from Charlestown to Malden, and remained in the Tufts family until the early 20th century. In the 1820s Charlotte Cushman, the noted Boston actress, spent her childhood holidays at 'Uncle Oliver's Farm'".

Peter Tufts eventually acquired a large parcel of farmland on the south side of Winter Hill. What is now Sycamore Street was originally the drive leading to the house. Peter and Oliver Tufts were, in addition to the farm, involved in establishing some brickyards that were an important business in Somerville in the 19th century.

== See also ==
- National Register of Historic Places listings in Somerville, Massachusetts
