= No Escape (1953 film) =

1953 film by Charles Bennett

- Theatrical release poster
- Directed by: Charles Bennett
- Screenplay by: Charles Bennett
- Produced by: Matt Freed; Hugh Mackenzie
- Starring: Lew Ayres; Sonny Tufts; Marjorie Steele
- Cinematography: Benjamin H. Kline
- Edited by: Roy V. Livingston
- Music by: Bert Shefter
- Color process: Black and white
- Production company: Matthugh Productions
- Distributed by: United Artists
- Release date: 1953
- Running time: 76 minutes
- Country: United States
- Language: English
- Budget: $176,000

No Escape is a 1953 American film noir crime film directed by Charles Bennett starring Lew Ayres, Sonny Tufts and Marjorie Steele.

Bennett called the film "dreadful! I had a ten day shooting schedule."

== Plot ==
The action is set in San Francisco where the film opens in a documentary style. When evidence and circumstance in a murder case points to a young woman as the main suspect, both her boyfriend (a police detective) and a struggling songwriter who plays piano in a bar, decide to withhold evidence from the police. Both of them ostensibly act to protect the woman, who believes that she accidentally killed the victim after an attempted sexual assault.

Later, the girl, knowing that the songwriter did not commit the murder, helps him to escape from a police dragnet when he becomes the main suspect. She and the songwriter fall in love and eventually compare notes about the events surrounding the murder, leading them to realize that someone else must be the culprit. The boyfriend is revealed as the actual murderer, and is arrested after he attempts to kill them to hide his guilt.

== Cast ==
- Lew Ayres as John Howard Tracy
- Sonny Tufts as Det. Simon Shayne
- Marjorie Steele as Pat Peterson
- Lewis Martin as Lt. Bruce Gunning
- Gertrude Michael as Olga Valerie Lewis
- Charles Cane as Wilbur K. Grossett
- Renny McEvoy as Turnip
- Bobby Watson as Claude Duffy (as Robert Watson)
- James Griffith as Peter Hayden
- Robert Bailey as Detective Bob
- Robert Carson as Dr. Seymour

== Production ==
The film was based on an original story by Charles Bennett. It was to be the first production from Associated Film Artists, a company formed in 1948 by publicist Whitney Bolton, actor Louis Hayward and director Edgar G. Ulmer.

In December 1949 it was announced Freddie Bisson of Independent Artists would make the film, and was hoping to star Dana Andrews and Robert Cummings.

The film was eventually made by Mattugh Productions, produced by Hugh McKenzie and Mat Freed. It was picked up for release by United Artists.

The film was going to star Louis Hayward but he dropped out when filming shifted to Los Angeles. Shooting started in January 1953.

== Reception ==
=== Critical response ===
TV Guide gave the film a lukewarm review. The editors wrote, "The plot seems suspenseful but the lackluster direction has no feel for thriller pacing. Things move too slowly with overwritten dialog mouthed in only average performances by the ensemble. However, the music captures the film's potential mood nicely. It's a pity the film does not live up to the score."
