= I Love a Soldier =

1944 film by Mark Sandrich

- Theatrical release poster
- Directed by: Mark Sandrich
- Written by: Allan Scott
- Produced by: Mark Sandrich
- Starring: Paulette Goddard; Sonny Tufts; Beulah Bondi; Walter Sande; Mary Treen; Ann Doran
- Cinematography: Charles Lang
- Edited by: Ellsworth Hoagland
- Music by: Robert Emmett Dolan
- Production company: Paramount Pictures
- Distributed by: Paramount Pictures
- Release date: August 15, 1944
- Running time: 106 minutes
- Country: United States
- Language: English

I Love a Soldier is a 1944 American drama film directed by Mark Sandrich and written by Allan Scott. The film stars Paulette Goddard, Sonny Tufts, Beulah Bondi, Walter Sande, Mary Treen and Ann Doran. The film was released on August 15, 1944, by Paramount Pictures.

== Cast ==
- Paulette Goddard as Evelyn Connors
- Sonny Tufts as Dan Kilgore
- Beulah Bondi as Etta Lane
- Walter Sande as Sgt. Lionel 'Stiff' Banks
- Mary Treen as Cecilia 'Cissy' Grant
- Ann Doran as Jenny Butler
- Marie McDonald as Gracie
- James Bell as Williams
- Barry Fitzgerald as Murphy

== Reception ==
T.M.P. of The New York Times said, "To the wheel of life has been given a full, mad twirl in I Love a Soldier, which took up residence yesterday at the Paramount. And since life seldom moves along on a plane, maybe it would have been expecting too much for this particular film to maintain a perfect level. But the ups and downs and the fancy curves which the story takes in discussing the problem of war marriages neither makes for an arresting entertainment nor does it help to clarify a question that is of vital importance right now to a good many young people. Apparently both Mark Sandrich, the producer-director, and Allan Scott, the author, weren't quite sure either just how the subject should be treated, for they tackle it, by turns, in dead seriousness and with broad comic strokes."
