= The Crooked Way =

1949 film by Robert Florey

- Theatrical release poster
- Directed by: Robert Florey
- Screenplay by: Richard H. Landau
- Based on: the radio play No Blade Too Sharp by Robert Monroe
- Produced by: Benedict Bogeaus
- Starring: John Payne; Sonny Tufts; Ellen Drew
- Cinematography: John Alton
- Edited by: Frank Sullivan
- Music by: Louis Forbes
- Production company: Benedict Bogeaus Productions
- Distributed by: United Artists
- Release date: April 22, 1949
- Running time: 90 minutes
- Country: United States
- Language: English

The Crooked Way is a 1949 American film noir starring John Payne, Sonny Tufts and Ellen Drew. Directed by Robert Florey and shot by John Alton, the film has a similar plot (a war hero loses his memory from a combat wound) to another film noir, Somewhere in the Night.

== Plot ==
After sustaining a head wound in combat, decorated World War II veteran Eddie Rice (John Payne) is treated at a San Francisco military hospital for a permanent form of amnesia. This leaves him with no knowledge of his life, family and friends prior to his enlistment. Army intelligence is unable to fill this void, as all they know about his past is that he enlisted in Los Angeles. Doctors tell him that no medical cure exists for his condition, but suggest that returning to L.A. might allow him to run into people who know him and might help fill in the blanks.

Rice does so, and promptly runs into some folks who recognize him. However, they know him as Eddie Riccardi, a dangerous gangster gone missing, whose past record generates mistrust both among the police and all those who formerly knew him. A woman, Nina Martin, appears to help him, but instead turns him over to ruthless crime boss Vince Alexander (Sonny Tufts), who was betrayed by Eddie before leaving town, and is now out for revenge. Vince tries to frame Eddie for the murder of a policeman, but Nina, who reveals to Eddie that she used to be his wife in a stormy marriage, finds her bitterness toward him changing to tenderness, and decides to help him genuinely.

== Cast ==
- John Payne as Eddie Rice/Eddie Riccardi
- Sonny Tufts as Vince Alexander
- Ellen Drew as Nina Martin
- Rhys Williams as Lieutenant Joe Williams
- Percy Helton as Petey
- John Doucette as Sgt. Barrett
- Charles Evans as Captain Anderson (as Charlie Evans)
- Greta Granstedt as Hazel Downs
- Raymond Largay as Arthur Stacey, M.D.
- Harry Bronson as Danny
- Hal Baylor as Coke (as Hal Fieberling)
- Don Haggerty as Hood
- Jack Overman as Hood
- Crane Whitley as Doctor Kemble/Off-Screen Narrator
- John Harmon as Kelly
- Garry Owen as Man from Green Acres Mortuary

== Reception ==
The contemporary The New York Times film critic wrote, "The Crooked Way races along as a melodrama should and it has more than enough plot to keep its hard-working actors going from one dangerous situation to another. But there is so much pointless brutality in it that one may seriously question whether the movie people are wise to go on with the making of such pictures. The human family may not be perfect, but why subject it to so-called entertainment that is only fit for savage beasts." In the 2009 book 100 Film Noirs, Jim Hillier compares and contrasts the film to Somewhere in the Night. Hillier says that The Crooked Way benefited from its low budget by forcing the filmmakers to be more creative, which makes it the better film.
