= El Paso Stampede =

1953 film by Harry Keller

- Directed by: Harry Keller
- Written by: Arthur Orloff
- Starring: Allan Lane; Black Jack; Eddy Waller; Phyllis Coates
- Production company: Republic Pictures Corporation
- Distributed by: Republic Pictures Corporation
- Release date: September 8, 1953
- Running time: 53 minutes
- Country: United States
- Language: English

El Paso Stampede is a 1953 Western film directed by Harry Keller.

== Plot ==
Federal Marshal "Rocky" Lane (Allan Lane) saddles up Black Jack to go to the Mexican border to investigate cattle rustling during the Spanish–American War He gets a job with feed-merchant Nugget Clark, and discovers that Nugget's wizened little helper, Josh Bailey has been giving cattle shipment information to the town dentist, Mason "Doc" Ramsey. Ramsey happens to be the secret leader of the rustlers headed by Floyd Garnett. When Ramsey and Garnett steal some of Nugget's cattle feed, Rocky follows them to their hideout through a waterfall into a hidden valley. The outlaws have kidnapped Alice Clark, and Rocky captures Ramsey after Garnett is killed in a gun battle.

== Cast ==
- Allan Lane – 'Rocky' Lane
- Black Jack – Rocky's Horse
- Eddy Waller – Nugget Clark
- Phyllis Coates – Alice Clark
- Stephen Chase – Mason 'Doc' Ramsey
- Roy Barcroft – Floyd Garrett
- Edward Clark – Josh Bailey
- Tom Monroe – Marty
- Stanley Andrews – Marshal Zeke Banning
- William Tannen – Joe
