= Serpent Island (film) =

- Directed by: Tom Gries
- Written by: Tom Gries
- Produced by: Bert I. Gordon
- Starring: Sonny Tufts
- Cinematography: Bert I. Gordon
- Edited by: Bert I. Gordon
- Music by: Domingo Rodrigues
- Production company: Z-A Productions
- Distributed by: Medallion Television
- Release date: 1954
- Running time: 62 min.
- Country: United States
- Language: English

Serpent Island is a 1954 horror adventure film directed by Tom Gries in his directorial debut. Shot in Haiti, the film was produced and co-directed by Bert I. Gordon in his film debut. It stars Sonny Tufts and Mary Munday.

== Cast ==
- Sonny Tufts as Pete Mason
- Mary Munday as Ricki Andre
- Tom Monroe as Kirk Ellis
- Rosalind Hayes as Ann Christoff
- Don Blackman as Jacques
