= Tom Monroe (actor) =

American actor

- Born: September 2, 1919
- Died: December 2, 1993 (aged 74)
- Occupation: Actor
- Years active: 1946–1977

Tom Monroe (September 2, 1919 – December 2, 1993) was an American actor.

Monroe's parents were Mr. and Mrs. B. F. Monroe of Waco, Texas.

== Filmography ==
Year	Title	Role	Notes
1946	The Dark Corner	Policeman	Uncredited
1948	G-Men Never Forget	2nd Joe - Bomber Pilot Thug	Serial, [Ch. 8], Uncredited
1948	Albuquerque	Townsman / Barfly	Uncredited
1948	Panhandle	Poker Player	Uncredited
1948	Mr. Reckless	Drilling Worker	Uncredited
1949	Angels in Disguise	Malone	Uncredited
1949	Powder River Rustlers	Guard	
1950	Quicksand	Motorcycle Officer	
1950	Code of the Silver Sage	Blacksmith	Uncredited
1950	The Invisible Monster	Gates - Cop in Cave	Serial, [Ch.7], Uncredited
1950	The Underworld Story	Durham's Hood	Uncredited
1950	I Shot Billy the Kid	Pete Maxwell	Uncredited
1950	The Cariboo Trail	Bartender	
1950	Border Treasure	Dimmick - Henchman	
1950	Border Rangers	Hackett - Henchman	
1950	Rustlers on Horseback	Guard Outside Hotel	
1950	Southside 1-1000	Federal Dispatcher	Uncredited
1950	Short Grass	Cabin Wrecker	Uncredited
1951	Two Lost Worlds	Captain Tallman	
1951	The Tall Target	Zouaves	Uncredited
1951	Drums in the Deep South	Confederate Soldier	Uncredited
1951	Westward the Women	First Man	Uncredited
1952	Rose of Cimarron	Townsman	
1952	Hoodlum Empire	Rocco	Uncredited
1952	Young Man with Ideas	Policeman	Uncredited
1952	The Half-Breed	Russell	
1952	Carson City	Miner	Uncredited
1952	Horizons West	Marshal Jim Clawson	Uncredited
1953	San Antone	Minor Role	Uncredited
1953	The Homesteaders	Henchman Jake	
1953	The Neanderthal Man	Stocky Townsman	
1953	Fort Algiers	Colonel's Aide	Uncredited
1953	El Paso Stampede	Marty	
1953	Calamity Jane	Barfly	Uncredited
1954	The Command	Pvt. Nikirk	Uncredited
1954	The Boy from Oklahoma	Henchmen	Uncredited
1954	The Long Wait	Harry	Uncredited
1954	Man with the Steel Whip	Worker	Uncredited
1954	Private Hell 36	Patrolman Tom	Uncredited
1954	Serpent Island	Kirk Ellis	
1955	Jupiter's Darling	Outrider	Uncredited
1955	Santa Fe Passage	Blacksmith O'Doyle	Uncredited
1955	The Far Horizons	George	Uncredited
1955	Son of Sinbad	Cutthroat	Uncredited
1955	The Road to Denver	Man in Buckboard	Uncredited
1956	The First Texan	Lt. Hargrave	Uncredited
1956	Giant	Guard at Governor's Ball	Uncredited
1957	War Drums	Dutch Herman	
1957	Shoot-Out at Medicine Bend	Quaker	Uncredited
1957	The Lawless Eighties	McGee	Uncredited
1957	Gunsight Ridge	Wedding Witness	Uncredited
1957	The Walter Winchell File	Officer Pat Trollman	Episode: "Country Boy"
1958	The Lost Missile	Bus Driver	Uncredited
1959	Rio Bravo	Henchman	Uncredited
1959	Westbound	Ed	Uncredited
1959	The FBI Story	Klansman	Uncredited
1969	Marlowe	Policeman	Uncredited
1971	The Last Movie	Citizen	
1971	Skin Game		Uncredited
1977	The Legend of Frank Woods	Rance	(final film role)
