= The Untamed Breed =

1948 film by Charles Lamont

- Directed by: Charles Lamont
- Screenplay by: Tom Reed
- Based on: Eli Colter (story "Something to Brag About") (based upon a Saturday Evening Post)
- Produced by: Harry Joe Brown
- Starring: Sonny Tufts; Barbara Britton; George 'Gabby' Hayes
- Cinematography: Charles Lawton Jr.
- Edited by: Jerome Thoms
- Music by: George Duning
- Color process: Cinecolor
- Production company: Sage Western Pictures
- Distributed by: Columbia Pictures
- Release date: October 21, 1948
- Running time: 79 minutes
- Country: United States
- Language: English

The Untamed Breed is a 1948 American western drama film directed by Charles Lamont and starring Sonny Tufts, Barbara Britton and George 'Gabby' Hayes. Shot partly on the Iverson Ranch, it was distributed by Columbia Pictures.

== Plot ==
A couple are brought together in the hunt for a bull that has escaped in the Pecos cattle country in Texas.

== Cast ==
- Sonny Tufts as Tom Kilpatrick
- Barbara Britton as Cherry Lucas
- George "Gabby" Hayes as Windy Lucas
- Edgar Buchanan as John Rambeau
- William Bishop as Larch Keegan
- George E. Stone as Pablo
- Joe Sawyer as Hoy Keegan
- Gordon Jones as Happy Keegan

== See also ==
- List of American films of 1948

== Bibliography ==
- Pitts, Michael R. Western Movies: A Guide to 5,105 Feature Films. McFarland, 2012.
