= Eli Colter =

American short story writer

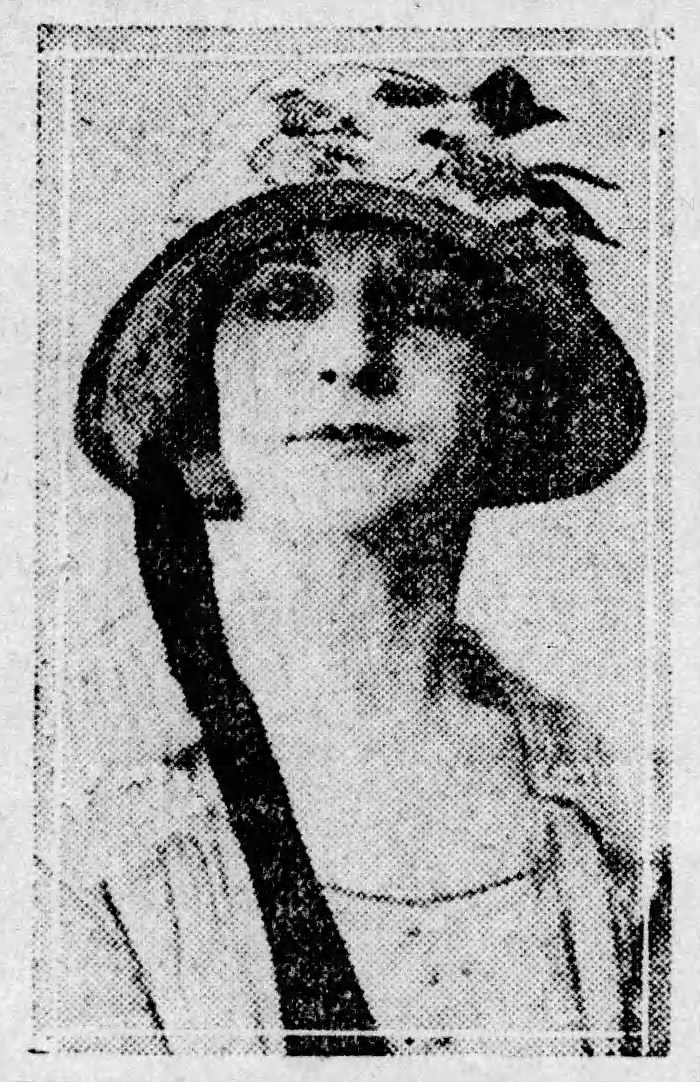
- Eli Colter in 1926
- Born: September 30, 1890; Portland
- Died: May 30, 1984 (aged 93); Los Angeles
- Occupation: Writer
- Spouse(s): Don Alviso

Eli Colter (September 30, 1890 – May 30, 1984) was the pen name of May Eliza Frost, an American short story writer who published over three hundred stories in magazines from 1918 to 1952.

She was born on September 30, 1890 in Portland, Oregon. She sold her first short story in 1918 but considered the beginning of her career a story published in Black Mask in 1922.

Most of her stories were Westerns, in a style that has been described as "hard-boiled". She published in both western themed pulp magazines like Lariat Story and Western Story as well as general interest publications like Liberty and the Saturday Evening Post. The film The Untamed Breed (1948) was based on her short story "Something to Brag About". She also published seven Western novels.

She published sixteen horror stories in Weird Tales and Strange Stories from the 1920s to the 1940s. These stories were all collected in The Last Horror and Other Stories (2025).

Colter also published a trio of mystery novels - The Gull Cove Murders (1946), Cheer for the Dead (1947), and Rehearsal for the Funeral (1953) - featuring the detective Pat Campbell.

She published her last story in 1952. Eli Colter died on 30 May 1984 in Los Angeles.

== Personal life ==
She married John Irving Hawkins, a ranch hand, in 1926 and they divorced in the 1930s. She was married to Glenn Fagalde, who published short stories under the name Don Alviso, until his death in 1957.

== Bibliography ==
- The Adventures of Hawke Travis: Episodes in the Life of a Gunman. New York: Macmillan, 1931.
- Bad Man's Trail. New York: Alfred H. King, 1931.
- Outlaw Blood. New York: Alfred H. King, 1932
- Three Killers. New York: Alfred H. King, 1932.
- The Outcasts of Lazy S. New York: Alfred H. King, 1933.
- Jungle Woman: The Amazing Experiences of Mrs. Frances Yeager, First White Woman to Live in the Sumatra Jungle. Appleton-Century, 1935.
- Blood on the Range. New York: Dodge, 1939.
- Canyon Rattlers. New York: Dodge, 1939.
- The Gull Cove Murders. Mill, 1946.
- Cheer for the Dead. Mill, 1947.
- Poison Springs. Curl, 1947.
- Rehearsal for the Funeral. Arcadia, 1953.
- The Last Horror and Other Stories. Sarnath, 2025.

=== Short stories (horror) ===
- “Farthingale’s Poppy.” Weird Tales 6, No. 1 (July 1925): 37–46.
- “The Deadly Amanita.” Weird Tales 6, No. 6 (December 1925): 781–92.
- “On the Dead Man’s Chest.” Weird Tales 7, No. 1 (January 1926): 21–28, 128–34; 7, No. 2 (February 1926): 232–44; 7, No. 3 (March 1926): 379–90; 7, No. 4 (April 1926): 553–65.
- “The Corpus Delicti.” Weird Tales 8, No. 4 (October 1926): 495–502.
- “The Last Horror.” Weird Tales 9, No. 1 (January 1927): 29–46, 143–44.
- “The Greatest Gift.” Weird Tales 9, No. 3 (March 1927): 361–68.
- “The Dark Chrysalis.” Weird Tales 9, No. 6 (June 1927): 747–66, 860; 10, No. 1 (July 1927): 113–25; 10, No. 2 (August 1927): 242–50.
- “The Golden Whistle.” Weird Tales 11, No. 1 (January 1928): 85–104.
- “The Curse of a Song.” Weird Tales 11, No. 3 (March 1928): 367–85.
- “The Man in the Green Coat.” Weird Tales 12, No. 2 (August 1928): 215–31.
- “The Vengeance of the Dead.” Weird Tales 13, No. 2 (February 1929): 193–212; 13, No. 3 (March 1929): 383–96.
- “The Man Who Died Twice.” Weird Tales 34, No. 5 (November 1939): 9–17.
- “The Crawling Corpse.” Strange Stories 2, No. 3 (December 1939): 13–29.
- “One Man’s Hell.” Strange Stories 3, No. 2 (April 1940): 13–27.
- “Design for Doom.” Strange Stories 4, No. 1 (August 1940): 81–90.
- “The Band of Death.” Strange Stories 5, No. 1 (February 1941): 14–32.
