= Cottonpickin' Chickenpickers =

1967 American film

Cottonpickin' Chickenpickers is a 1967 American film produced by Southeastern Pictures Corporation. Its cast includes some major country-music performers.

It was the final feature film of silent film great Lila Lee, former leading man Sonny Tufts and lead B actor Tommy Noonan.

== Cast ==
- Del Reeves
- Hugh X. Lewis
- Sonny Tufts
- Tommy Noonan
- Maxie Rosenbloom
- Lila Lee
- Greta Thyssen
- David Houston
- Mel Tillis
