= Run for the Hills =

1953 film

- Directed by: Lew Landers
- Written by: Leonard Neubauer; Marion Parsonnet
- Produced by: R.D. Ervin; Edward Lewis; Mark O. Rice
- Starring: Sonny Tufts; Barbara Payton; Mauritz Hugo
- Cinematography: Paul Ivano
- Edited by: Irving Berlin
- Music by: Raoul Kraushaar
- Production company: Jack Broder Productions
- Distributed by: Realart Pictures; British Lion (UK)
- Release date: June 24, 1953
- Running time: 72 minutes
- Country: United States
- Language: English

Run for the Hills is a 1953 American comedy film directed by Lew Landers and starring Sonny Tufts, Barbara Payton and Mauritz Hugo. The film's sets were designed by the art director Ernst Fegté.

== Cast ==
- Sonny Tufts as Charlie Johnson
- Barbara Payton as Jane Johnson
- John Harmon as Jed Taylor
- Mauritz Hugo as Mr. Hudson
- Vici Raaf as Mrs. Cornish
- Jack Wrightson as George
- Paul Maxey as Sheriff
- Harry Lewis as Mr. Carewe
- John Hamilton as Mr. Harvester
- Byron Foulger as Mr. Simpson
- Sid Slate as Wagstaff
- Charles Victor as Craig
- William Fawcett as Orin Hadley
- Dee Ann Johnston as Malinda
- George Sanders as Television Commentator
- Rosemary Colligan as Cave Girl
- Jack McElroy as Radio Announcer
- Ray Parsons as Hermit
- Michael Fox as Phineas Cragg
- Jean Willes as Frances Veach
- Richard Benedict as 'Happy' Day
- Lester Dorr as Reporter Outside Elevator
- Al Hill as Process Server
- William Tannen as Charlie's Co-Worker

== Bibliography ==
- Lewis, Jon. Hard-Boiled Hollywood: Crime and Punishment in Postwar Los Angeles. Univ of California Press, 2017.
