= Peter Tufts =

17th-century American businessman

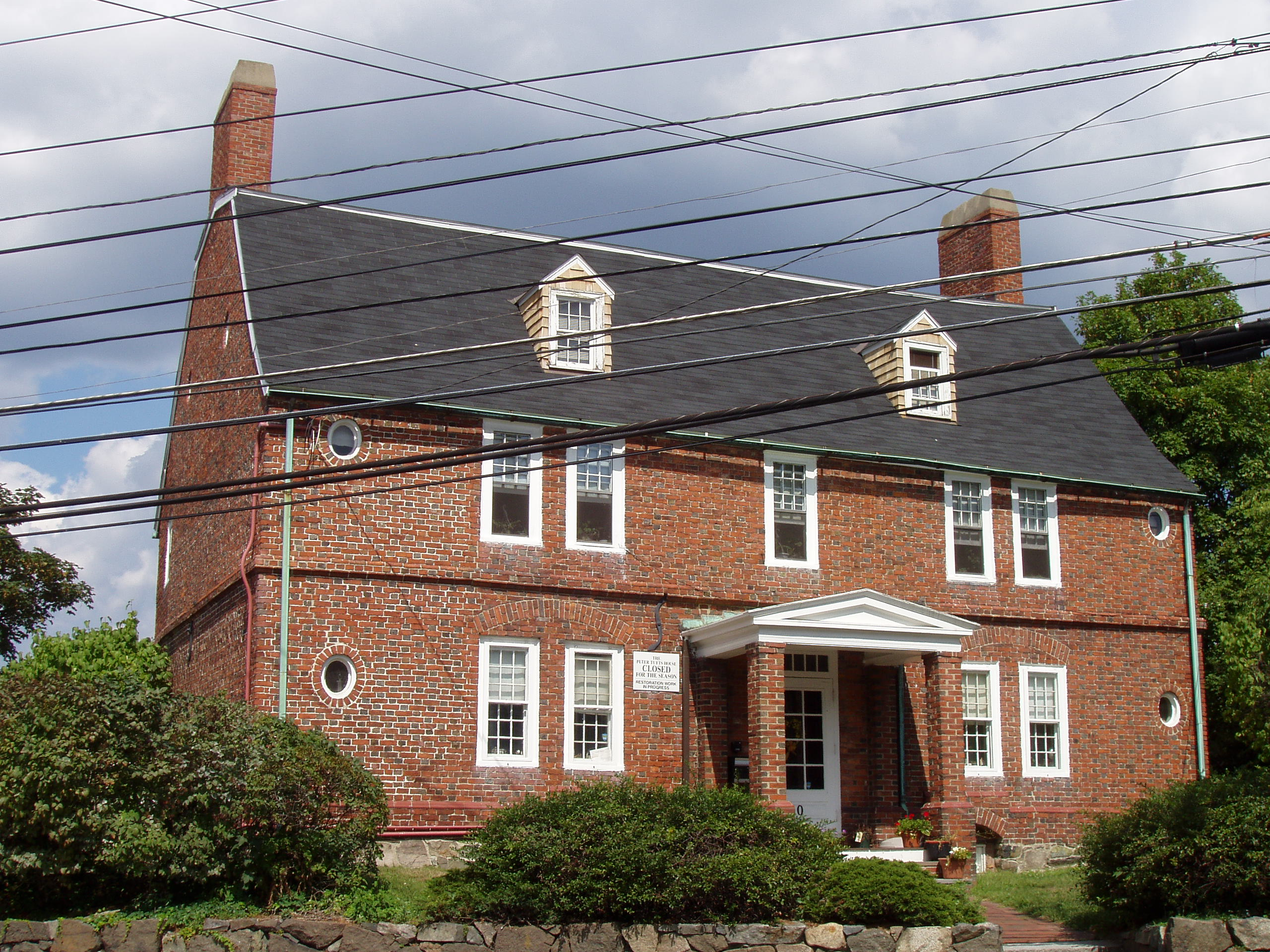
Peter Tufts House, c. 1677-1680

Peter Tufts, Sr. (1617 – May 13, 1700) was a prominent early citizen of Malden and Medford, Massachusetts, and ancestor of Charles Tufts who donated land for the Tufts University campus. The Peter Tufts House is still standing and is among the oldest all brick houses still standing in the United States.

Peter Tufts (also spelled "Tuffts," Tuffes," and "Turfs") immigrated from Wilby, Norfolk, England to Charlestown, Massachusetts, which at the time included the present day cities of Somerville, Malden (then known as "Mystic Side"), and Medford. He is recorded in 1637 "on the Malden side (of Charlestown)." By 1638 he owned 43 acres (17 ha) there.

By 1647 Peter was living at "Mystic Side," two years later to be incorporated as Malden, Massachusetts. In early 1647 Peter, along with William Bridge, became ferryman at Charlestown Neck on the Mystic River, succeeding Philip Drinker in that role. This ferry, later known as the Penny Ferry, served the inhabitants of Malden and the upper towns until 1787 when it was superseded by the Malden Bridge.

Tufts' involvement in the Salem witch trials was thus described in the 1889 History of Malden:

Peter Tufts of Mystic Side, who many times during a long life appears in court records and files, and not always as a desirable neighbor, also complained of them [Elizabeth Fosdick of Malden & Elizabeth Paine of Mystic Side]...Complaint v. Eliz Fosdick & Eliz Paine, Salem, Mary the 30th 1692: "Lt. Nathaniell putnam and Joseph Whipple both of Salem Village made Complaint in behalfe of theire majesty against Elizabeth fosdick of Maulden (sic) the wife of John fosdick afores Carpenter & Elizabeth paine off Charlestown the wife of Stephen paine of said place husbandman for sundry acts of Witchcraft by them Committed Lately on the bodies of Marcy Lewis and Mary Warren of Salen Village or farmes to theire great hurt therefore crauses Justice. Signed Nathaniel Putnam & Joseph Whipple. The abovesayd Complaint was Exhibited before us Salem May the 30th 1692. Signed John Hathorne and Jonathan Corwin. peter Tuft of Charlestown also appeared before us Salem June 2, 1692 and also Complained against both ye aboves for acts of Witchcraft by them Committed on his negro Woman. The mark of Peter Tufts +".

Tufts was recorded as a Freeman of Malden and the Massachusetts Bay Colony May 3, 1665, and October 15, 1679 (NEHGS "Register").

Peter Tufts was the first representative from Medford to the Massachusetts General Court in 1689, however it is unclear whether this was Peter Tufts, Sr. (then 72), or his firstborn son Captain Peter Tufts (then 41).

Around 1678, the elder Peter Tufts built the Peter Tufts House in Medford, which was then given to his first son, the younger Captain Peter Tufts.

His will is recorded in Middlesex County, Massachusetts as #22994, dated March 1, 1693, with codicils of July 8, 1695, and June 13, 1698, and executed June 10, 1701.

He is buried at Malden Church Yard, also known as Bell Rock Cemetery.
