= Swell Guy =

1946 film by Frank Tuttle

- Directed by: Frank Tuttle
- Screenplay by: Richard Brooks
- Based on: The Hero (1921 play) by Gilbert Emery
- Produced by: Mark Hellinger
- Starring: Sonny Tufts; Ann Blyth; Ruth Warrick; William Gargan; Thomas Gomez; Mary Nash; John Litel
- Cinematography: Tony Gaudio
- Edited by: Edward Curtiss
- Music by: Frank Skinner
- Production company: Mark Hellinger Productions
- Distributed by: Universal Pictures
- Release date: December 5, 1946
- Running time: 87 minutes
- Country: United States
- Language: English

Swell Guy is a 1946 American drama film directed by Frank Tuttle and starring Sonny Tufts, Ann Blyth and Ruth Warwick. It was distributed by Universal Pictures. The film's screenplay by Richard Brooks is based on the 1921 play The Hero by Gilbert Emery.

== Plot ==
Almost no one in his California hometown knows what a scoundrel and cad Jim Duncan is. He has been away working as a war correspondent, but has lost his job and abandoned a wife.

Jim stays at his family's home for months for free, tricks people into paying his way, gambles and romantically pursues socialite Marian Tyler, even though she is seeing another man, Mike O'Connor. Her father Arthur is also the boss of Jim's brother, Martin.

Up to his old ways, running up debts, Jim is asked to leave by Sarah, his mother. He goes to Los Angeles, but is followed by Marian, who is pregnant by him. She realizes he does not love her. Mike offers to marry Marian, even though she is expecting another man's child.

Others continue to mistakenly believe Jim to be a nice guy, including his brother and also Tony, a nephew who idolizes him. Tony makes the mistake of emulating Jim one day, walking down a railroad track. Jim saves him just in time, but at the cost of his own life, leaving friends and relatives remembering him as "a swell guy."

== Cast ==
- Sonny Tufts as Jim Duncan
- Ann Blyth as Marian Tyler
- Ruth Warrick as Ann Duncan
- William Gargan as Martin Duncan
- Mary Nash as Sarah Duncan
- Thomas Gomez as Dave Vinson
- John Craven as Mike O'Connor
- Millard Mitchell as Steve
- John Litel as Arthur Tyler
- Donald Devlin as Tony Duncan
- Vince Barnett as Sam Burns
- Patrick McVey as Ray Link.
