= Charles Tufts =

American businessman (1781–1876)

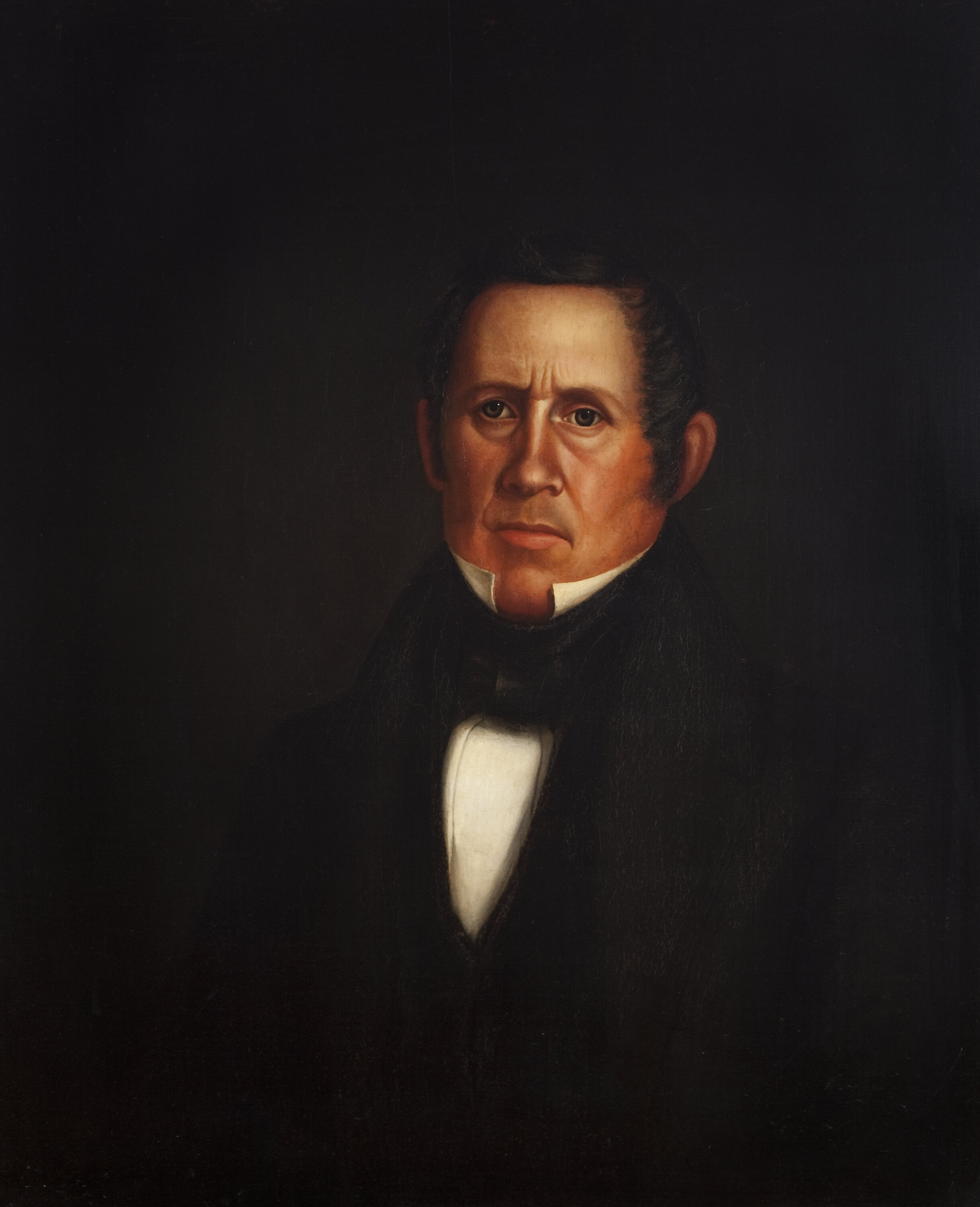
Charles Tufts

Charles Tufts (July 16, 1781 – December 24, 1876) was an American businessman and philanthropist.

== Biography ==
Tufts was born in Medford, Massachusetts, the son of Abigail and Daniel Tufts. He was a descendant of Peter Tufts, an early colonist who came to America from England circa 1637. He received a common-school education. He made a fortune through his brickmaking factory, and inherited a large amount of land. Tufts donated 20 acres (8.1 hectares) of land in Medford for what was to be named Tufts University. In time, Charles Tufts donated another 80 acres (32 hectares), bringing the campus area to 100 acres (40 hectares). He married Hannah Robinson in 1821, but had no children.

After making his fortune through brick manufacturing, he donated land to the city of Medford in 1852, on which the university bearing his name was later established.

He died in Somerville, Massachusetts, which is also home to part of the Tufts University campus, and was buried in Mount Auburn Cemetery in Cambridge.

== Legacy ==
- Tufts University
- The World War II Liberty Ship SS Charles Tufts was named in his honor and built in Portland, Oregon in 1944.
