= Al Christy =

American actor, executive and broadcaster

- Born: Albert Christopher Ladesich; September 7, 1918; Kansas City, Kansas, U.S.
- Died: March 3, 1995 (aged 76); Kansas City, Missouri, U.S.
- Resting place: Mount Calvary Cemetery, Kansas City, Missouri, U.S.
- Occupations: Actor; advertising executive; radio and television announcer

Albert Christopher Ladesich (September 7, 1918 – March 3, 1995), better known as Al Christy, was an American actor, advertising executive, and radio and television announcer.

He was born in Kansas City, Kansas, the son of Croatian parents who had immigrated to the United States a few years before. He graduated from Wyandotte High School in 1937. This was where he first became interested in dramatics.

Ladesich began his career working under his father, selling insurance for Armour Packing Company in Kansas City. He then served in World War II, and upon his discharge, returned to Kansas City and became an announcer for radio station WDAF. It was here that he first adopted the stage name "Al Christy." While with WDAF, Ladesich also did acting on various dramatic radio programs being produced in Kansas City, most notably The Air Adventures of Jimmie Allen, where he starred as mechanic "Flash" Lewis during the show's 1946-47 run. He also found acting work in educational and industrial films being produced by the Calvin Company of Kansas City, including films directed by Robert Altman. Ladesich would continue to appear in Calvin films (and ones produced by Centron Corporation in Lawrence, Kansas) until the early 1980s.

In 1950 shortly after the new WDAF-TV station was begun in Kansas City, Ladesich became one of three weathercasters there. In 1953 when popular weather announcer Shelby Storck left WDAF, Ladesich, who by now was assistant program director for the station, took over his spot and the name Al Christy became more well known in the Kansas City area. The Ladesich family was very much involved in Kansas City media. Al's brother and sister were associated with WDAF-TV as well, as directors and producers.

In 1956 Ladesich left WDAF-TV and became a director, writer, producer, and account manager for a Kansas City advertising agency which primarily produced radio and television commercials. Taking normal work hours and not being required to work at night like when toiling in radio and TV, Ladesich now had time in the evenings to devote to what soon became his chief hobby and avocation, acting. In 1956 he began regularly appearing in productions of Kansas City's top little theater group, the Resident Theater. He missed appearing in only four or five Resident productions over a course of twelve years. In 1961 while vacationing in Los Angeles, he visited his old Kansas City friend Robert Altman, who by now was directing episodic television in Hollywood. Altman told Ladesich about an episode of a TV series he was currently directing, titled Bonanza, that he needed an actor for to play a bartender. Ladesich spent one day on the set, playing "Joe the Bartender," and scored his first screen credit. In 1966 director Richard Brooks planned to shoot his film In Cold Blood in and around Kansas City, and endeavored to use local talent for many of the smaller roles. Ladesich was among the local actors enlisted, portraying a sheriff.

In the late 1960s the Resident Theater closed down and soon professional theater was established for the first time in Kansas City, via the Missouri Repertory Theater. Ladesich was a regular there throughout the 1970s and 1980s and was well-known to Kansas City theatergoers during that time as a versatile character actor who could "do everything from Shakespeare to light comedy." He also, by this time, had been promoted to a vice-president and board member of a Kansas City ad agency and retired early in the 1980s. He spent his "retirement" years primarily in California, scoring small roles in various feature films and television shows. He appeared in episodes of Falcon Crest, The Twilight Zone, Knots Landing, and Punky Brewster, played Dr. Holmes in the 1985 film Stand Alone, and played one half of the third "documentary couple" in When Harry Met Sally... from 1989.

By 1990, Ladesich had returned to Kansas City and played a judge in the film Mr. and Mrs. Bridge which was shot there that year. Soon after, he began to suffer from severe heart trouble and then officially "retired." He died in March 1995 of heart failure at his home in Kansas City, Missouri. Al having been a lifelong bachelor, the only remaining Ladesich relative was Al's older brother, who died three years later. Al Christy was interred at Mount Calvary Cemetery in Kansas City, Missouri.

== Partial filmography ==
- In Cold Blood (1967) - Sheriff
- Der Preis fürs Überleben (1980)
- Stand Alone (1985) - Dr. Holmes
- When Harry Met Sally... (1989) - Documentary Couple #5
- Mr. and Mrs. Bridge (1990) - Judge (final film role)
