= Calvin Company =

American film production company

- Company type: Private
- Industry: Film production
- Founded: 1931 in Kansas City, Missouri, U.S.
- Founders: Forrest Calvin; Betty Calvin; Lloyd Thompson; Larry Sherwood
- Headquarters: Kansas City, Missouri, U.S.
- Products: Movie-Mite film projector
- Services: Educational and industrial films

The Calvin Company was a Kansas City, Missouri-based advertising, educational and industrial film production company that for nearly half a century was one of the largest and most successful film producers of its type in the United States.

== Origins ==
Forrest ("F. O.") Calvin from Pleasanton, Kansas, studied journalism and advertising at the University of Kansas in the late 1920s. In 1928, F. O. drew a briefly used version of the KU mascot, the Jayhawk. After graduating from college, F. O. went to work for an advertising agency in Kansas City, doing direct mail advertising and commercial art and finding both rough-going. However, his tenure at that agency did lead to an interesting discovery. The ad agency was occasionally using a 16 mm movie camera to make little advertising films for its clients. This was an almost unheard-of practice, as the 16 mm film format was at the time reserved mostly for home movies, though it was convenient and inexpensive and perfect for educational and business films. F. O. Calvin was determined to invest in the future of 16 mm.

The agency did not survive the Great Depression, but in 1931 F. O. and his wife Betty founded the Calvin Company, originally an advertising agency that specialized in 16 mm business movies. They started out in a one-room office in the Business Men Assurance Building, across the street from Union Station in Kansas City. Betty Calvin managed the business side; F. O. Calvin was the salesman. In the early years, most of their time was divided between convincing prospective industrial clients that 16 mm was right for them, and then producing the movies. Early on, the Calvins took advantage of Kansas City's proximity to locations, industry, and commerce, and their earliest clients were area-based businesses and organizations such as Kansas Flour Mills, the Security Benefit Association of Topeka, Kansas, the Kansas City Chamber of Commerce, Western Auto, and Kansas City Southern Railways.

In 1932, one of F. O.'s former college fraternity brothers, Lloyd Thompson (a photography enthusiast who was interested in film technology), joined the fledgling Calvin Company as vice-president. The next year, another of F. O. Calvin's old college buddies, Larry Sherwood, joined the company as executive producer and general sales manager. After a few years, the Calvin Company had done some decent business and amassed a regular staff of twenty persons. In 1936, they moved into their own studio and headquarters building in Kansas City. This facility also included a state-of-the-art 16 mm film processing laboratory that Calvin used for its own productions, as well as for providing processing services to smaller 16 mm producers with their own filmmaking capacity, such as universities. These services helped to spread and further the Calvin name throughout the non-theatrical film industry.

After a while, nationally known Fortune 500 companies began to take a chance on 16 mm and hired the Calvin Company to produce sales training and promotional movies for them. DuPont, Goodyear, Caterpillar Tractor Company, General Mills, Southwestern Bell, and Westinghouse had all joined Calvin's client list by the end of the 1930s. These were accounts that would last for decades. Calvin also branched out into the educational film field, producing pioneering classroom films that were distributed through companies such as McGraw-Hill, Encyclopædia Britannica, and the U.S. Office of Education to public schools throughout the country. The Calvin Company also became known as an innovative and creative force in the non-theatrical movie industry. They pioneered many efficient 16 mm filmmaking and processing methods, and in 1938 they claimed to have produced the first business film in full sound and full color.

== The 1940s ==
In 1940, F. O. Calvin formed a subsidiary, the Movie-Mite Corporation, that manufactured 16 mm motion picture projectors and other equipment. These included the first desk-sized movie projector. Tens of thousands of these "Movie-Mites" were sold through the 1940s.

World War II proved a gold mine for the Calvin Company, which prospered by making dozens of safety and training films for the Navy and Air Force, as well as numerous morale-boosting shorts sponsored by the likes of the U.S. Department of Agriculture. Toward the end of the war, F. O. Calvin was a dollar-a-year-man for the Navy in Washington, D.C., advising on the running of a filmmaking system similar to the Calvin Company's. The Navy had wanted him to move the Calvin operations to Washington, but F. O. had resisted, wishing the setup to remain in Kansas City, a town he liked to work and live in. The work for the armed forces during the war established a good name and reputation for the Calvin Company, and the firm continued to produce films for the U.S. government for years afterward.

By the end of the war, the Calvin Company had experienced terrific growth. The company's regular staff had grown to sixty persons, and they had moved into their newest and biggest headquarters, a seven-story fireproof brick building at the corner of Truman Road and Troost Avenue, just east of downtown Kansas City. The New Center Building, as it was called, had been built in 1907 and had originally housed two large movie theaters on its first floor, and the Calvin Company converted them into two huge sound stages for film production, said to be the largest between New York and Los Angeles. The Calvin building also contained projection rooms, conference rooms, executive offices, offices for directors and writers, animation studios, printing and processing labs, and space for the Movie-Mite Corporation, which kept going strong until the early 1950s.

Following World War II, there was a tremendous boom in production of industrial and educational films in the U.S., and the Calvin Company was in line to be the leading producer in the field. There was also now a plethora of affordable new 16 mm film equipment on the market, and while this signaled that the Calvin Company's initial goal of popularizing 16 mm had been achieved, it also brought many inexperienced new producers into the field. In 1947, sensing this as an industry problem, F. O. Calvin decided to have his company organize a three-day seminar called the Calvin Workshop, held on the company's sound stages in Kansas City where workable 16 mm filmmaking procedures would be explained and demonstrated. Anybody in the non-theatrical film industry in North America was invited to attend, and the event attracted over two hundred people. It was so successful that the Calvin Company decided to continue it, making it a celebrated annual event that was held every year until 1975. At its peak, the Calvin Workshop attracted some 450 producers and technicians from the U.S. and Canada each year.

== The 1950s and "Golden Age" ==
The Calvin Company's "Golden Age" lasted roughly a decade, from the late 1940s until the late 1950s. At the time, the business of making films for businesses and schools was booming, and Calvin was the country's leading producer in that field, regularly making movies for all of the biggest Fortune 500 companies, and often winning festival awards and prizes for these efforts as well. After World War II, the Calvin staff grew from one hundred to two hundred, and then eventually to nearly three hundred full-time workers. The company did not hire freelancers, and kept a permanent staff. There were always about four or five directors on staff, and the same rotating number of writers, cameramen, editors, and sound technicians. This made it possible for at least four movies to be in production at once. All film production was supervised by Frank Barhydt, a former Kansas City radio and newspaper writer who went to work for the firm as a director during the war due to his interest in documentary films. There were annual Christmas parties and Fourth of July picnics, as well as a long-lived tradition on payday of employees visiting a nearby pub and betting their paychecks on shuffleboard bowling. At Calvin a union was voted out several times. There was profit-sharing, access to top management, and encouragement of initiative. During this time, they were turning out some 18 million feet of film a year ("or enough to make one 16-millimeter strip stretching from Key West to Seattle and part way back," as one contemporary local newspaper put it). In 1951 they were the first outside firm to be licensed by Eastman Kodak to process its color film, and in the early 1950s Calvin was the first professional movie company to utilize the 8 mm film format. In the late 1950s, the Calvin Company made significant inroads in the educational film field, forming a subsidiary called University Films that often produced educational shorts in conjunction with universities and with publishing companies such as McGraw-Hill.

By the 1950s, Calvin was a brand name of merit trusted by Fortune 500 companies and film industry people throughout the country. Despite this, the firm was not particularly well known in Kansas City. However, it did serve as an important venue for the Kansas City arts, consistently employing many local actors and actresses, many of whom earned their main income in other fields such as radio and television announcing. They included Art Ellison, Shelby Storck, James Lantz, Bill Yearout, Murray Nolte, Twila Pollard, Henry Effertz, Bob Kerr, Keith Painton, Ken Heady, Leonard Belove, Stan Levitt, Harriet Levitt, Ralph Seeley, Harvey Levine, James Assad, Al Christy, and Sid Cutright. A few of these went on to careers as character actors and actresses in movies and TV, but most stayed in Kansas City and the only TV or movie roles they ever landed were ones in films and programs filmed on location in the area, such as In Cold Blood, Paper Moon, The Day After, and Mr. & Mrs. Bridge.

The Calvin Company also occasionally brought professional actors and actresses from Hollywood to do special roles or narration in their films. William Frawley, John Carradine, Jane Darwell, Morey Amsterdam, Arte Johnson, Judy Carne, James Whitmore, and E.G. Marshall all starred in Calvin offerings. Calvin could also sometimes call on former local people such as Harry Truman, Walter Cronkite, Thomas Hart Benton, and John Cameron Swayze to turn in appearances.

Calvin provided opportunities to aspiring young filmmakers from the area who would not or could not go to Hollywood. Calvin served as training for feature film and television directors as Robert Altman, Richard C. Sarafian, and Reza Badiyi. Altman, a Kansas City native, got his start directing films with Calvin in the early 1950s and used many Calvin regulars as cast and crew on his independently produced first feature film, The Delinquents, shot in Kansas City in 1956 and starring Tom Laughlin. This moderately successful teenage exploitation film, produced by area-based movie theater exhibitor Elmer Rhoden Jr., led to Altman's successful career in movies and television, and also led to a second feature film produced by Rhoden Jr. and concerned with troubled youth, The Cool and the Crazy, shot in Kansas City in 1958. This movie also featured many Calvin stalwarts in the cast and crew.

== The 1960s and Closure ==
In 1959, the original four founders of the Calvin Company retired and, though they continued to serve on the firm's advisory board, the Calvin organization came under new management. Leonard Keck, a longtime Calvin executive, took over presidential duties and the company's name was changed to Calvin Productions. This change in management led to the departure of several longtime core production employees and a slow but steady decline in business during the 1960s. By 1968, the production staff had been cut drastically and several longtime accounts had drifted away. Keck attempted to combat the slow period and expand by renaming the company Calvin Communications and purchasing the first two floors of the building that the company had started out in with a one-room office back in 1931, but the whole situation worsened when projectors were traded in for VCRs. During the 1970s, Calvin briefly attempted to catch a part of the videotape market, but the company was more suited to the 16 mm film format which it had originally pioneered forty years earlier, and the idea of shifting to video was soon abandoned. Satellite studios in Louisville, Pittsburgh and Detroit were sold. Finally, there was just the Calvin studios in Kansas City, where it had all begun, and around 1980 regular film production ceased. Only the Calvin film processing laboratory continued, losing more and more business and more and more money until finally it officially ceased operation on Halloween of 1982. In 1991, the old seven-story Calvin headquarters at 1105 Truman Road fell to the wrecking ball to make way for a large virtual school project.

== Legacy ==
In 2002, industrial film archivist Rick Prelinger moved 150 of the Calvin Company's surviving film prints and approximately 25,000 cans of film master materials and unclaimed items from Calvin's laboratory from Kansas City to the Library of Congress, where about 3,000 Calvin films are, as of autumn 2019, being accessioned and catalogued. Several of the Calvin Company's films, including the cult classic The Your Name Here Story (a satire of commonly used industrial film formats and cliches produced for showing at one of the Calvin Workshop seminars), are available for free viewing and downloading from the Prelinger Archives. Also available for free viewing and downloading at Prelinger are eleven reels of outtakes and stock footage found in the Calvin Company's vaults, some of which derives from the production of The Your Name Here Story. However, the reels contain footage from many different Calvin productions dating from around 1940 to the early 1960s. The Calvin film Delegating Work (1959) can be purchased along with other Calvin films on office management problems such as The Bright Young Newcomer on the compilation videotape As the Office Turns through A/V Geeks. The award-winning safety film The Perfect Crime (1954) (directed by Robert Altman), as well as other films like The Color of Danger (1968) and Your School Safety Patrol (1958), can be purchased on videotape or DVD through Something Weird Video.

=== Actual Industrial Films ===
- The Bright Young Newcomer (1958)
- Coffee Break (1958)
- Freeze-In (1969 - Starring Arte Johnson and Judy Carne)
- The Grapevine (1958)
- Hidden Grievance (1959)
- The Magic Bond {Part 1} (1955 - Directed by Robert Altman)
- The Magic Bond {Part 2}
- Murder on the Screen (1958)
- Promotion Bypass (1958)
- The RCA 16 mm Sound Projector (1958)
- Tornado (1956)
- The Trouble With Women (1959)
- Wood for War (1942)

=== Industrial Film Self-Parodies ===
- #Bfl O {ggGX = STwWcfl x 2s4 (1963)
- Check...and Let Me Know (1962)
- How Much? (1963)
- Overs and Outs (1964)
- The Vicious Circle, or What Are We Trying to Do?(1964)
- The Your Name Here Story (1960)

=== Calvin Company Outtake and Stock Footage Reels ===
- Reel 1 (1940s-1960s)
- Reel 2 (1940s-1960s)
- Reel 3 (1940s-1960s)
- Reel 4 (1940s-1960s)
- Reel 5 (1940s-1960s)
- Reel 6 (1940s-1960s)
- Reel 7 (1940s-1960s)
- Reel 8 (1940s-1960s)
- Reel 9 (1940s-1960s)
- Reel 10 (1940s-1960s)
- Reel 11 (1940s-1960s)
