= SuEllen Fried =

American bullying prevention activist (1932–2024)

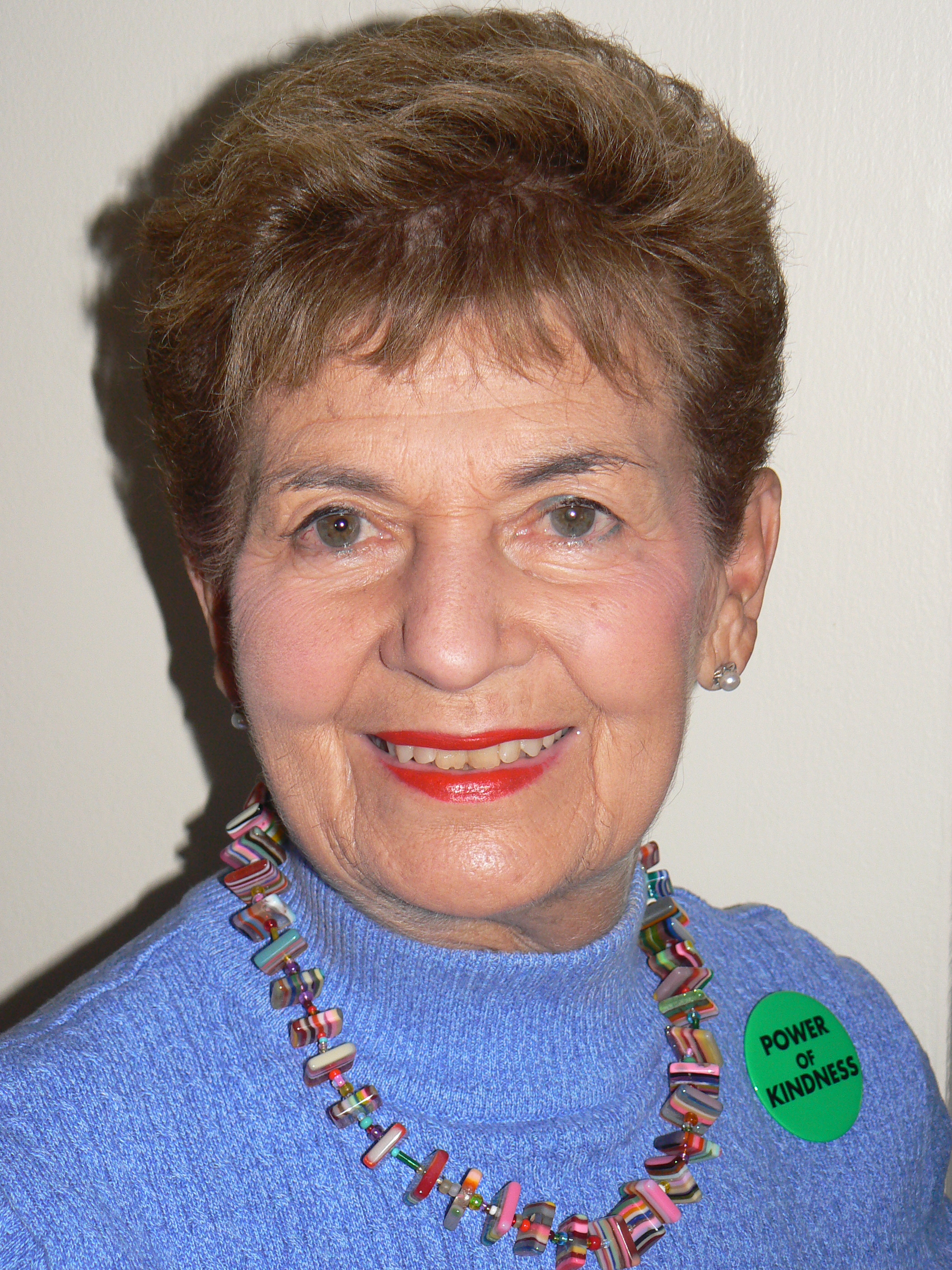
- Fried in 2013
- Born: SuEllen Weissman; September 18, 1932; St. Louis, Missouri, U.S.
- Died: October 3, 2024 (aged 92); Prairie Village, Kansas, U.S.
- Other name: Sue
- Education: Washington University in St. Louis; Park University (BA)
- Occupations: Writer, Bullying prevention activist, Educator
- Board member of: Life member Prevent Child Abuse America; President Emeritus Reaching Out From Within; Commissioner LINC (Local Investment Commission); Advisory Board Kansas City Friends of Alvin Ailey; Member Author's Guild; Charter Member American Dance Therapy Association
- Spouse: Harvey Fried
- Children: Jeffery Fried; Paula Fried, Ph. D Marc Fried
- Website: www.bullysafeusa.com

SuEllen Fried was an American bullying prevention activist, writer and educator. She was number 900 on President George H. W. Bush's Thousand Points of Light foundation list in 1993.

== Early life and education ==
Born SuEllen Weissman on September 18, 1932 in St. Louis, Missouri.

She graduated from University City High School in University City, Missouri in 1950. She studied at Washington University in St. Louis, where she was a member of Sigma Delta Tau. She earned a B.A. from Park University, in Parkville, Missouri in 1975 and an M.A. equivalency from the American Dance Therapy Association in 1996.

== Career ==
Fried was a member of the Dance Ensemble of the St. Louis Municipal Opera from 1949 through 1951. She also appeared in a party scene in Kansas City native Robert Altman's 1957 film The Delinquents.

Fried worked as a dance therapist for twenty years, and from 1961 to 1978, Fried was a volunteer dance and drama therapist at Osawatomie State Hospital in Kansas. In 1970 was appointed to President Richard Nixon's Task Force on the Mentally Handicapped. She was a consultant to the National Institute of Mental Health as well as the Center for Advanced Study and Continuing Education in Mental Health.

Fried's work with Dr. Karl Menninger led her to found STOP Violence in 1982, an organization that developed a program called Reaching Out From Within. This monthly program trained volunteers to teach prison inmates to change their violent language, actions and thoughts. As of 2004, it ran ten programs in seven Kansas Correctional facilities.

The program has been effective, recording much lower recidivism rates among program participants than non-participating inmates. From a Huffington Post profile of Fried and Reaching Out From Within:—

Over 40 percent of American prisoners released in 2004 returned to a state penitentiary within three years of being released, according to a 2011 Pew study. Among inmates who attend between 20 and 40 ROFW meetings, the recidivism rate drops to 23 percent, according to Fried, and it further decreases to just 8 percent among inmates who attend a minimum of 60 meetings.

=== Abuse prevention work ===
Fried draws upon her dance therapy experience in her abuse prevention program, helping teach body awareness and how to adjust to others.

Fried's seven "prevention principles" were defined in her book Bullies and Victims, and given the acronym SCRAPES:

- Self-esteem and skill enrichment
- Conflict resolution and mediation skills
- Respect for differences
- Anger management and assertiveness training
- Problem solving skills
- Empathy training
- Sexuality awareness training.

Her books are intended for parents of children who have been bullied as well as those whose children may be bullies. She and her co-authors attempt to offer practical suggestions for minimizing peer abuse, to teach about the harm caused by gossip and name-calling and to prevent an escalation to violence.

In 2002, Fried founded BullySafeUSA, which has enabled her to work with more than 90,000 students, educators, councilors, administrators and parents in 36 states Additionally, she and her organization are working to help reduce cyber-bullying on social networking sites and web pages.

== Death ==
Fried died on October 3, 2024.

== Books ==
- Bullies & Victims: Helping Your Children Through the Schoolyard Battlefield - 1996 (co-author Paula Fried, Ph. D)
- Bullies, Targets, and Witnesses: Helping Children Break the Pain Chain - 2004 (co-author Paula Fried, Ph. D)
- Banishing Bullying Behavior: Transforming the Culture of Pain, Rage and Revenge - 2009 (co-author Blanche Sosland, Ph. D)
- Banishing Bullying Behavior: Transforming the Culture of Peer Abuse - 2011 (revised second edition) (co-author Blanche Sosland, Ph. D)
- 30 Activities for Getting Better At Getting Along - 2011 (co-author Lynne Lang)
