= Richard Bakalyan =

American actor (1931–2015)

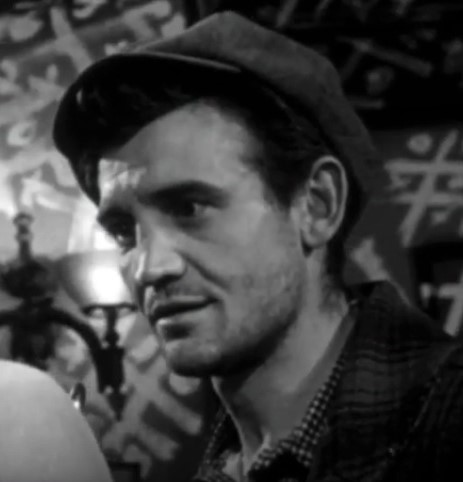
- Bakalyan in Pressure Point (1962)
- Born: January 29, 1931; Watertown, Massachusetts, U.S.
- Died: February 27, 2015 (aged 84); Elmira, New York, U.S.
- Resting place: Forest Lawn Memorial Park, Hollywood Hills
- Other name: Dick Bakalyan
- Occupation: Actor
- Years active: 1954–2008
- Spouse: Elizabeth Lee "Betty" Baumann (m. 1952; died 1967)

Richard Bakalyan (January 29, 1931 – February 27, 2015) was an American actor who started his career playing juvenile delinquents in his first several films.

== Early life ==
Richard Bakalyan was born on January 29, 1931, in Watertown, Massachusetts, the son of Armenian-born William Nishan Bakalyan and Elsie Florence (née Fancy) Bakalyan, a Canadian from Nova Scotia. He had two brothers. His father died in 1939, when Richard was 8.

Growing up in a tough neighborhood, Bakalyan learned boxing to defend himself in street fights. He served a year's probation at age 15 for unknown crimes.

Bakalyan served in the United States Air Force during the Korean War. After four years of service, he was honorably discharged with the rank of staff sergeant.

== Career ==
=== Film ===
Early in his career he was cast as thugs, outlaws, and in military action films, like The Delinquents (1957), The Bonnie Parker Story (1958), Up Periscope (1959), and Panic in Year Zero! (1962). During the filming of 1958's juvenile-gang drama The Cool and the Crazy, he and fellow actor Dick Jones were arrested for vagrancy while on location in Kansas City. They were standing on the corner between takes in "JD" outfits and the police thought that they were actual gang members. It took several hours for the film crew to explain to the police what was going on and get them released from jail.

By the mid-1960s, as he grew out of these roles, he became something of a comic heavy, often cast in family Disney films though still known in dramas. Some of his Disney projects included Never a Dull Moment (1968), The Computer Wore Tennis Shoes (1969), The Strongest Man in the World (1975), Return from Witch Mountain (1978), and voice-efforts in The Fox and the Hound (1981), as 'Dinky' the finch bird.

Bakalyan had an uncredited role in The Greatest Story Ever Told (1965) as the good thief on the cross. He appeared in several of Frank Sinatra's movies during the 1960s, such as Robin and the 7 Hoods (1964), None but the Brave (1965), and Von Ryan's Express (1965), becoming lifelong friends with the Sinatra family. While filming Pressure Point in 1962, he met co-star Bobby Darin, who later became one of Bakalyan's closest friends. It's reported Bakalyan was one of the last friends to see Darin, before his premature death from heart disease, in December, 1973. Bakalyan played Detective Loach in Roman Polanski's 1974 film Chinatown opposite Jack Nicholson and Faye Dunaway.

=== Television ===
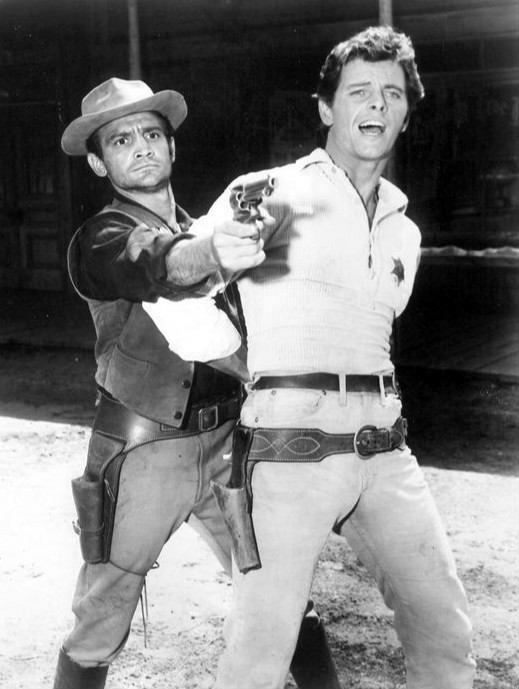
Bakalyan and Peter Brown in Lawman (1961)

Bakalyan has also appeared on numerous television shows from the 1950s through the 2000s. Early small screen performances came in Panic!, The Life and Legend of Wyatt Earp, The Many Loves of Dobie Gillis, Hawaiian Eye and The Untouchables. In 1962, he played Sgt. Wolfson on the World War II drama Combat! in the 1st season, episode 12 "The Prisoner", returning in 1966 to play Sgt. Piper in the 4th season, episode 27 "Gitty". Later he appeared in a variety of shows, including Batman, Ellery Queen, Mannix, Love, American Style, Kojak, The Bionic Woman, Charlie's Angels, Hill Street Blues, Emergency!, where he starred as Charley, a cantankerous fire department mechanic, and the NBC comedy series My Name Is Earl, which was his last screen effort in October 2008.

In 1968, Bakalyan was featured in "Way Down Cellar," a two-part story on Walt Disney's Wonderful World of Color. He was a regular on Dean Martin Presents: The Bobby Darin Amusement Company (1972) and The Bobby Darin Show (1973).

== Personal life ==
Bakalyan was married to Elizabeth Baumann from 1952 until her death in 1967.

A prolific character actor, Bakalyan was profiled in the book Names You Never Remember, With Faces You Never Forget by Justin Humphreys.

== Death ==
Bakalyan died suddenly of a stroke on February 27, 2015, at the Arnot Ogden Medical Center, in Elmira, New York, aged 84.

== Filmography ==
=== Film ===
Year	Title	Role	Notes
1954	Attila		
1957	The Delinquents	Eddy	
1957	The Delicate Delinquent	Artie	
1957	Dino	Chuck	
1957	The Brothers Rico	Vic Tucci	
1957	Hear Me Good	Hermie	
1958	The Cool and the Crazy	Jackie Barzan	
1958	Juvenile Jungle	Tic-Tac	
1958	The Bonnie Parker Story	Duke Jefferson	
1958	Hot Car Girl	Walter 'Duke' Willis	
1959	Paratroop Command	Charlie	
1959	Up Periscope	Seaman Peck	
1959	-30-	Carl Thompson	
1961	The Errand Boy	Jason, Anastasia's Director	
1962	Panic in Year Zero!	Carl	
1962	Pressure Point	Jimmy	
1962	Follow That Dream	Sheriff	
1963	Operation Bikini	Seaman Hiller	Uncredited
1964	Robin and the 7 Hoods	Robbo's Hood #1	
1964	The Patsy	Boy at Spring Hop	Uncredited
1965	None but the Brave	Corporal Ruffino	
1965	The Greatest Story Ever Told	Good Thief on Cross	Uncredited
1965	Donald's Fire Survival Plan	Common Sense (voice)	Short film
1965	Von Ryan's Express	Corporal Giannini	
1966	Follow Me, Boys!	Umpire	Uncredited
1967	The St. Valentine's Day Massacre	John Scalise	
1968	Never a Dull Moment	Bobby Macoon	
1969	It's Tough to Be a Bird	M.C. Bird (voice)	Short film
1969	The Computer Wore Tennis Shoes	Chillie Walsh	
1972	Now You See Him, Now You Don't	Cookie	
1973	Charley and the Angel	Buggs	
1974	Chinatown	Detective Loach	
1975	The Strongest Man in the World	Cookie	
1976	The Shaggy D.A.	Freddie	
1978	Return from Witch Mountain	Eddie	
1979	Understanding Alcohol Use and Abuse	Emotion (voice)	Short film
1979	H.O.T.S.	Charlie Ingels	
1980	The Man with Bogart's Face	Lt. Bumbera	
1981	The Fox and the Hound	Dinky (voice)	
1984	Blame It on the Night	Manzini	
1994	Confessions of a Hitman	Uncle Dino	
2000	The Mask Maker	Mask Maker	Short film
2001	Dischord	Det. Dunbarton	
2006	Art School Confidential	Cranky Guard	

=== Television ===
Year	Title	Role	Notes
1955	Luke and the Tenderfoot	Bill Bangles	Episode: "The Boston Kid"
1957	Official Detective	Bob Wolfe	Episode: "The Blind Man"
1957	The Lineup		Episode: "The 17643 Case"
1957	Casey Jones	Jackie	Episode: "Way Station"
1957–1958	The Walter Winchell File	Yutch / Sid	2 episodes
1958	Mickey Spillane's Mike Hammer	Lou	Episode: "Dead Men Don't Dream"
1958	Panic!	Carl	2 episodes
1958	The Silent Service	Torpedoman Pasqual Mignon / Motor Machinist Mate George J. McKnight	2 episodes
1958	Bat Masterson	Sam Teller	Episode: "Double Trouble in Trinidad"
1959	The D.A.'s Man	Dunn	Episode: "The Mob Versus O'Hara"
1959	The Lawless Years	Eddie Safranik / Buggsy	2 episodes
1959	U.S. Marshal	Joe Savage	Episode: "Trigger Happy"
1959	Hotel de Paree	Rob	Episode: "A Rope Is for Hanging"
1959	The Deputy	Billy the Kid	Episode: "The Big Four"
1959	Peter Gunn	Chino Amalo	Episode: "Kidnap"
1959	Hennesey	Harry Benson	Episode: "Hennesey Meets Mrs. Horatio Grief"
1959	Tightrope!	Loomis	Episode: "Cold Kill"
1959	Bold Venture	Johnny Regis	Episode: "Blue Moon"
1959–1961	The Rebel	Bart Vogan / Calley Kid	3 episodes
1960	Wanted: Dead or Alive	Harry Quint	Episode: "Angela"
1960	Johnny Ringo	Lee Rafferty	Episode: "The Raffertys"
1960	Mr. Lucky	Spider	Episode: "Big Squeeze"
1960	Lock-Up	Spook Chambers	Episode: "Society Matron"
1960	Dan Raven	Darnell	Episode: "The Satchel Man"
1960	The Tall Man	Tiger Eye	Episode: "Tiger Eye"
1960–1963	The Untouchables	Cully / Lucky / Benno / Monk / Prisoner / Joe Courtney	6 episodes
1961	The DuPont Show with June Allyson	Lieutenant	Episode: "End of a Mission"
1961	Checkmate	Cabbie	Episode: "The Human Touch"
1961	The Many Loves of Dobie Gillis	Sergeant Wyncoup	2 episodes
1961	Miami Undercover	Zip Logan	Episode: "Auto Motive"
1961	Holiday Lodge	Bobo Manning	Episode: "Never Hit a Stranger"
1961	Lawman	Eggers - Bank Robber	Episode: "Trojan Horse"
1961	Straightaway	Mike	Episode: "The Heist"
1961	Las Vegas Beat	Lt. Bernard McFeety	Television film
1962	The New Breed		Episode: "To Sell Another Human Being"
1962	Dr. Kildare	Yount	Episode: "The Burning Sky"
1962	The Dick Powell Show	Justin Wolf / Bartender	2 episodes
1962–1966	Combat!	Sgt. Piper / Sgt. Wolfson	2 episodes
1963	Hawaiian Eye	Spence Merrill	Episode: "The Long Way Home"
1963	Laramie	Mel Doleman	Episode: "Broken Honor"
1963	Wagon Train	Muscles	Episode: "The Sam Pulaski Story"
1964	Channing	Roberto	Episode: "Memory of a Firing Squad"
1964	Bob Hope Presents the Chrysler Theatre	Charlie	Episode: "Two Is the Number"
1964	Ben Casey	Abner Goetz	Episode: "For a Just Man Falleth Seven Times"
1965	Wendy and Me	Pete	Episode: "The Wendy Mob"
1965	No Time for Sergeants	Stanley Swackheimer	Episode: "Whortleberry Roots for Everyone"
1965	Vacation Playhouse		Episode: "Luke and the Tenderfoot"
1965	Branded	Roy Barlow	Episode: "The Richest Man in Boot Hill"
1966	Mister Roberts	Joe	Episode: "Black and Blue Market"
1966	The Monroes	Grac	Episode: "Night of the Wolf"
1966	The Tammy Grimes Show	Tony	Episode: "How to Steal a Girl Even If It's Only Me"
1966–1968	Batman	Verdigris / C. B. / Arbutus / Fouad Sphinx	6 episodes
1966–1969	Gunsmoke	Billy Holland / Teems	2 episodes
1967	The Girl from U.N.C.L.E.	Brutus	Episode: "The Phi Beta Killer Affair"
1967	Hondo	Cole Younger	Episode: "Hondo and the Judas"
1967	Cimarron Strip	Colly Sims	Episode: "Nobody"
1967–1972	Mannix	Eberle / Vincent's Thug / Frank Quigley	3 episodes
1967–1978	The Wonderful World of Disney	Ernie Nelson / Charlie / Shortie / Jocko / Narrator (voice)	8 episodes
1968	Garrison's Gorillas	Cpl. Robert Wade	Episode: "War Games"
1968	The Mod Squad	Fuller	Episode: "The Price of Terror"
1968	The Felony Squad	Gus Levering	Episode: "The Distant Shore"
1970	The Partridge Family	Skee	Episode: "Danny and the Mob"
1971	Love, American Style	Burglar	Segment: "Love and the Hiccups"
1972	The Bobby Darin Amusement Co.	Himself	7 episodes
1973	The Bobby Darin Show	Himself / Carmine	11 episodes
1974	Chase	Manduke	Episode: "Eighty-Six Proof TNT"
1974	The Manhunter	Johnny Fusco	Episode: "Jackknife"
1974–1975	Cannon	Dieter / Andy Norlan	2 episodes
1975	Kolchak: The Night Stalker	The 1st Killer	Episode: "The Trevi Collection"
1975	Kojak	Proctor	Episode: "Be Careful What You Pray For"
1975–1977	Emergency!	Charlie / Charley / Dewey	3 episodes
1976	The Whiz Kid and the Carnival Caper	Ernie Nelson	Television film
1976	Ellery Queen	Knucks O'Neill	Episode: "The Adventure of the Sunday Punch"
1976	Woman of the Year	Pinkey Barbiki	Television film
1976	Viva Valdez	Moretti	Episode: "The Apprentice"
1976	Monster Squad	Toil	Episode: "Ultra Witch"
1976	Switch	Sgt. Kingman	Episode: "Quicker Than the Eye"
1976	Holmes & Yoyo	Phillips	Episode: "The Hostages"
1977	The Streets of San Francisco	Gimpy	Episode: "Hang Tough"
1977	Most Wanted	Fred Conroy	Episode: "Ms. Murder"
1977	The Bionic Woman	Gino Talvin	Episode: "Once a Thief"
1977	Pine Canyon Is Burning	Charlie Edison	Television film
1977	Bunco	Henry Durand	Television film
1977–1978	Barnaby Jones	Winchell / Harry Layton	2 episodes
1978	The Rockford Files	Porter	Episode: "The Gang at Don's Drive-In"
1978–1981	Vega$	Bernie / Freddie 'Fingers' / Bronson / Marvin Hale	5 episodes
1978–1981	Charlie's Angels	Artie Weaver / Eddie Feducci / Thad Roper	3 episodes
1980	CHiPs	O'Hare	Episode: "The Strippers"
1980	The Misadventures of Sheriff Lobo	Mr. Crawford	Episode: "The Haunting of Orly Manor"
1980	The Love Boat	Ben	Episode: "Celebration/Captain Papa/Honeymoon Pressure"
1981	Border Pals	Little Eddie	Television film
1981	Fantasy Island	James	Episode: "The Lady and the Monster/The Last Cowboy"
1981–1984	The Fall Guy	Walt / Red Eye	2 episodes
1982	Herbie, the Love Bug	Detective O'Brien	Episode: "Herbie the Best Man"
1983	Cagney & Lacey	John Travis	Episode: "Jane Doe #37"
1983	Shooting Stars	Snuffy	Television film
1984	Matt Houston	Jimmy	Episode: "The High Fashion Murders"
1984	Hill Street Blues	Flaherty	Episode: "Fuched Again"
1985	Heart of a Champion: The Ray Mancini Story	Frank Jacobs	Television film
1986	Hardcastle and McCormick	Paul Perry	Episode: "When I Look Back on All the Things"
1987	Scarecrow and Mrs. King	Meatball Bonfelli	Episode: "The Khrushchev List"
1987	Sledge Hammer!	Clive Winston	Episode: "Hammer Hits the Rock"
1987–1988	Hunter	Kenny Dunstan	3 episodes
1987–1990	Matlock	Mickey Callahan / Bobby Devine	2 episodes
1995	Hudson Street	Frank Rampert	Episode: "Crime, Per Se"
1995–1996	Baywatch Nights	Bookie / Informant / Peebles Runkin	2 episodes
1998	JAG	Harold Green	Episode: "Yesterday's Heroes"
1998	Millennium	Abum	Episode: "Somehow, Satan Got Behind Me"
2004	Las Vegas	'Fast Tommy' Polone	Episode: "Always Faithful"
2004	Cold Case	Wendell Foyt	Episode: "The House"
2008	My Name Is Earl	Mr. Wallace	Episode: "Quit Your Snitchin'"
