= Shelby Storck =

American journalist

Shelby William Storck (October 3, 1916 – April 5, 1969) was an American newscaster, actor, writer, journalist, public relations specialist, and motion picture and television producer-director. He was a radio actor on The Air Adventures of Jimmie Allen and other programs, and appeared in the feature films The Delinquents and The Cool and the Crazy.

A descendant of General Joseph O. Shelby, Shelby Storck was born in Kansas City, Missouri and in 1937 graduated from the University of Kansas City, now the University of Missouri-Kansas City, where he had been active in student government, theatrical performances, and as an editor of the campus newspaper. Storck worked as a newscaster for the Kansas City Star and its affiliated radio station WDAF from 1939 until he joined the Navy in 1942. A Navy bomber pilot, he rose to the rank of lieutenant before being honorably discharged in 1945. Two of his years of service had been in the Mediterranean theater, where he saw action during World War II.

== Post-World War II years ==
On returning to Kansas City, Storck rejoined WDAF and again resumed newscaster duties but soon moved on to become campaign manager of Kansas City attorney Jerome Walsh's unsuccessful run for congressional office. Storck then joined the staff of T. R. Finn & Associates as its publicity director. He was assistant director of education and organization for the Consumers Cooperative Association, now known as Farmland Industries, from 1947 to 1949 and was public relations director and assistant manager of the North Kansas City Development Company in 1949 and 1950. He was also a semi-professional actor in local radio, television, civic theater, and in films made in the Kansas City area. Storck's first wife, the former Barbara Marsh, died of bulbar polio in 1950. He later established a Barbara Storck Memorial award for poetry at the University of Kansas City in her memory.

Shortly after his wife's death, Storck returned to broadcasting in 1951 and joined the staff of Kansas City's first television station, WDAF-TV (Channel 4), becoming the region's first television weather presenter. Within months, he played an instrumental role in the station's coverage of the Great Flood of 1951. Despite his local popularity, Storck left the WDAF-TV post after a labor dispute in 1953.

== Films ==
Shelby Storck continued in radio and television work through the 1950s, working between Kansas City and St. Louis, making documentary films which he often narrated as well as produced. He frequently acted in industrial and educational films produced by the Calvin Company of Kansas City and by the Centron Corporation of Lawrence, Kansas. There, he worked with such notable directors as Robert Altman and Herk Harvey. In 1954 he became general manager of KETC in St. Louis, a newly founded educational television station.

From 1955 to 1966 Storck was associated with Charles Guggenheim of St. Louis as a director and narrator of documentary and commercial movies produced by Guggenheim. Among the films Storck made while associated with Guggenheim were several award-winning documentaries on St. Louis history. Storck remarried, to longtime friend Jacqueline Field, in 1956. In 1960 the Storcks moved from Kansas City to St. Louis. In 1966, when Charles Guggenheim transferred his operations to Washington, D.C., Storck formed his own production company in St. Louis, Shelby Storck & Associates, Inc., and began producing documentaries and commercials. He was best known for making half-hour campaign biographies for politicians, mostly under the direction of media consultant Joe Napolitan, including successful films for Milton Shapp, Winthrop Rockefeller, and Mike Gravel. In 1968 Storck wrote, produced, and directed a half-hour promotional documentary on Hubert Humphrey called What Manner of Man, which was hugely instrumental in Humphrey's sudden surge in the polls towards the end of his unsuccessful race against Richard Nixon for President of the United States.

Shelby Storck had been diagnosed with heart disease and was under a doctor's care for several months. He died in his sleep, apparently after a heart attack, at home in St. Louis in April 1969. His wife, Jackie, was on the way by air to Taiwan to visit a sister when he died, and funeral arrangements had to be delayed for several days until she could return to St. Louis.

== Storck awards ==
There currently exists a Shelby Storck Award for Excellence in Undergraduate Teaching at the University of Missouri-Kansas City. The annual Storck Awards for Notable Achievement in the Political Advertising Arts were established by The Washington Post in 1980. Today, Shelby Storck is primarily known for the political films he produced in the 1960s, as well as for his role as a hard-nosed, wise-to-the-world police detective in the 1958 Kansas City-produced feature-length film The Cool and the Crazy (where his wife Jackie also makes a cameo appearance).

Shelby Storck had three children: Shelby Randall Storck (1943–1987), who followed in his father's journalistic footsteps and became a photographer; Phillip Alan Storck (b. 1944); and Gael Winslow Storck (b. 1950). He also had a stepdaughter, Kathy Field (b. 1948) from his second marriage.

== Film appearances ==
Ephermeral film archivist Rick Prelinger has in his possession several rare educational and industrial films that Shelby Storck acted in. Several are available for free viewing and downloading online on Prelinger Archives:

- What About Drinking? (1954 – In this Centron Corporation film directed by Herk Harvey, Shelby Storck plays a doctor who chats with a teenager about alcoholism)
- The Magic Bond (Part 2) (1956 – In this film produced by the Calvin Company for the Veterans of Foreign Wars and directed by Robert Altman, Storck narrates a brief sequence on the importance of voting)
- Coffee Break (1958 – A Calvin Company film, in which Storck plays an office boss frustrated by his employees' tendencies to take extra-long coffee breaks)
- Promotion Bypass (1958 – Another Calvin film on office workers, where Storck plays an office boss who tells his junior to send his "best man" over to a new office)
- The Innocent Party (1959 – An award-winning and groundbreaking Centron production directed by Herk Harvey, in which Storck portrays a school doctor who has an educational talk with a teen student who has contracted syphilis)
