= Dragstrip Riot =

1958 film

- Original lobby card
- Directed by: David Bradley
- Written by: George Hodgins
- Produced by: O'Dale Ireland (as O. Dale Ireland)
- Starring: Yvonne Lime; Gary Clarke; Fay Wray; Connie Stevens; Tony Butala
- Cinematography: Gilbert Warrenton (as Gil Warrenton)
- Edited by: John A. Bushelman
- Music by: Nicholas Carras
- Production company: Transworld Productions
- Distributed by: American International Pictures (USA)
- Release date: March 1958 (USA)
- Running time: 68 minutes
- Country: United States
- Language: English

Dragstrip Riot is a 1958 US teen-oriented sportscar club and motorcycle gang film produced by O'Dale Ireland and directed by David Bradley. It stars Yvonne Lime, Gary Clarke, Fay Wray and Connie Stevens. Set in coastal California, the film centres on a false accusation that a sportscar club member is responsible for the death of a member of a motorcycle gang and the gang's attempts to take revenge. Dragstrip Riot was released in the US by American International Pictures as a double feature with The Cool and the Crazy (1958), and distributed in Canada by Astral Films and in the UK by Anglo Amalgamated.

== Plot ==
The clean-cut members of the local sportscar club are enjoying summer in Malibu, California - driving their Corvettes, going to the beach, hanging out at the malt shop. But tensions simmer, nonetheless. Rick Martin (Clarke) and Bart Thorson (Bob Turnbull) both consider Janet Pearson (Lime) to be "their" girl. The boys almost come to blows, but Rick refuses to fight.

Rick lives with his mother, Norma (Wray), a war widow, and Gramps (Ted Wedderspoon), his paternal grandfather. The stern Gramps believes that Norma is coddling Rick by giving him an expensive sportscar and letting him loaf away the summer.

A motorcycle gang with leather jackets, greasy hair, motorcycle boots and long sideburns invades the malt shop, rudely ordering beer instead of the Cokes that the sportscar kids drink. The lone motorcycle girl is unlike the sportscar girls. She wears tight pants instead of dresses, and smokes cigarettes, and when she and one of the sportscar girls collide rumps while dancing, she says angrily, "Pull in your bumper, sister!" The two fight. Bart bumps the arm of Silva (Gabe DeLutri), the gang's leader, but makes it look as if Rick caused Silva to spill his beer. Silva challenges Rick to a fight, but Rick walks away.

Outside the malt shop, Silva again challenges Rick. This time Rick loses his temper and in the ensuing fight pins Silva to the ground. As the gang leaves, a humiliated Silva menacingly tells Rick that "this is only round one." Bart aligns himself with the motorcyclists because with Rick out of the way, Janet will be all his.

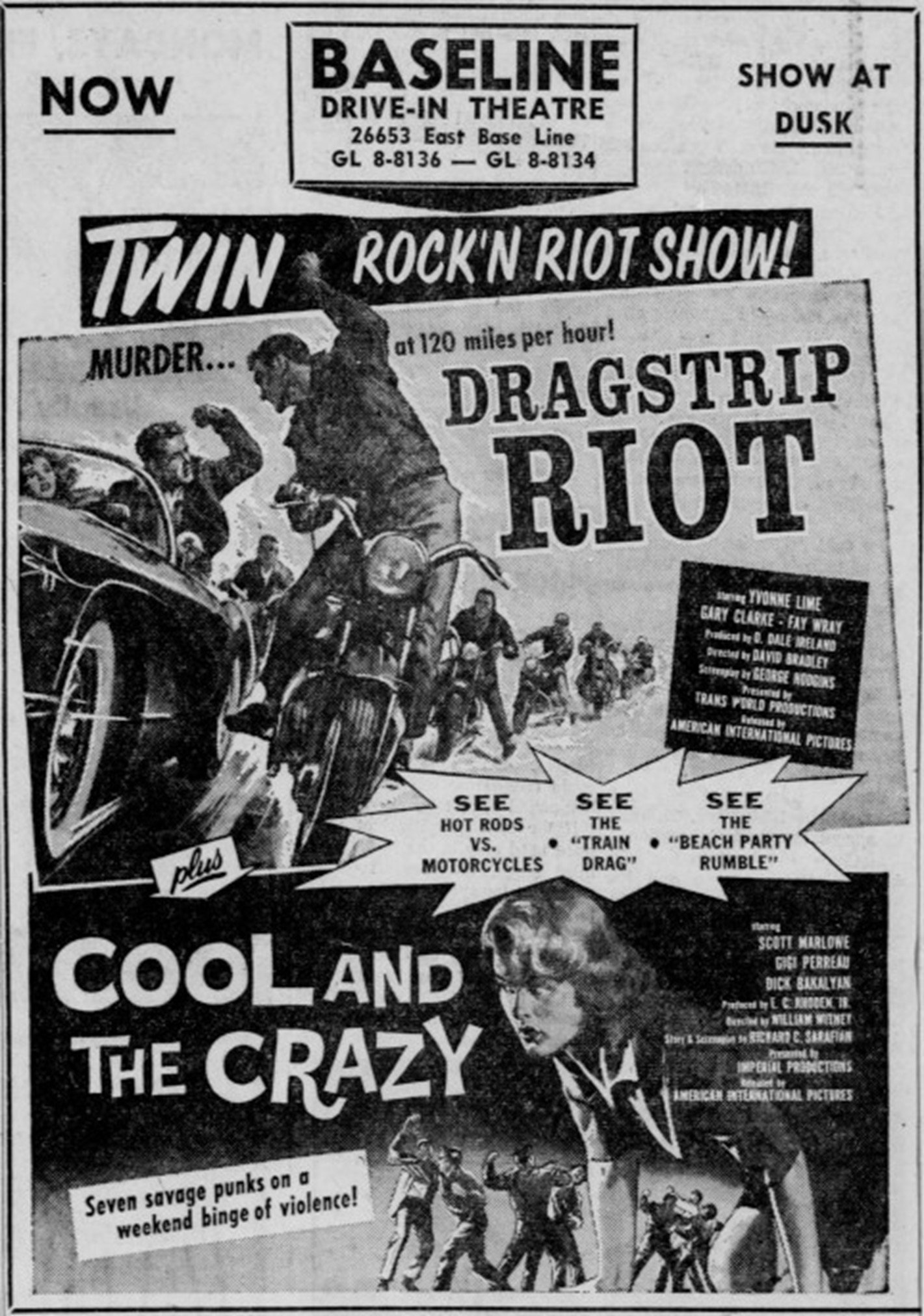
Drive-in advertisement from 1958 for Dragstrip Riot and co-feature, The Cool and the Crazy.

The sportscar boys enter a road race. Bart, trailing in second place, forces Rick out of the lead and goes on to win. Rick confronts Bart, accepting Bart's dare to a "train drag," in which they park their cars side by side on railway tracks and face a train speeding toward them at 90 mph (146 km/h). The "winner" is the driver who moves out of the way last, after the "loser" has chickened out and sped away. Rick wins, but realizing that he could have been killed, admits his stupidity to Janet.

After Bart tells the motorcycle gang where Rick is, they chase Rick up a mountain road. Silva pulls his motorcycle alongside Rick's Corvette, swinging wildly at him with a large wrench. After several misses, Rick stomps on his brakes and Silva accidentally hits fellow gang member Gordie (Barry Truex) on the head. Gordie fatally crashes; Silva blames Rick. An honourable Rick turns himself in to face a manslaughter charge.

When the sportscar kids read a newspaper article about Rick, they're shocked that he had spent six months in reform school for beating a boy when he was 14. Rick tells Janet that the boy had pulled a knife on him, but he was convicted as the boy was the son of "some bigshot politician." It is the reason Rick avoids fighting.

Bart tips off the gang that Rick and Janet are at the beach. They ambush the couple. Silva produces a speargun, intending to kill them to avenge Gordie's death. But just as Silva fires, Janet breaks free and the spear strikes Bart, who had been forced against his will to restrain Janet while Silva shoots her. A brawl erupts.

Norma and Gramps arrive. Instead of trying to stop the mayhem, though, Gramps encourages Rick to fight. A police car pulls up. The officers fire their guns into the air to stop the brawl and quickly arrest the motorcyclists. Bart survives being speared. Rick and Janet walk arm-in-arm down the beach, away from everything.

== Cast ==
- Yvonne Lime as Janet Pearson
- Gary Clarke as Rick Martin
- Fay Wray as Norma Martin
- Bob Turnbull as Bart Thorson
- Connie Stevens as Marge
- Gabe DeLutri as Silva
- Marcus Dyrector as Cliff
- Ted Wedderspoon as Gramps Martin
- Barry Truex as Gordie
- Marilyn Carroll as Rae
- Marla Ryan as Helen
- Steve Ihnat as Dutch
- Tony Batula as Joe
- Carolyn Mitchell as Betty
- Joan Chandler as Lisa
- Marc Thompson as Gary
- Allan Carter as Mike
- Aileen Carlyle
- Anton Van Stralen

== Production ==
The film's working title was Teenage Rumble; in the UK the film had the more sober title, The Reckless Age, but it also ran as Dragstrip Riot. The British Board of Film Censors (BBFC) approved the film under both titles for exhibition in the UK after reviewing it on 21 May 1958 and requiring that unspecified cuts be made. The BBFC issued the movie an A-certificate, which meant that it was "more suitable for adults."

Dragstrip Riot was in production at Sunset Stages in Los Angeles between 19 August and "early September" 1957, with location filming done in Malibu itself and at Paradise Cove, a beach in Malibu. The film's premiere in March 1958, along with that of The Cool and the Crazy, "may have been" in Kansas City, Missouri, where The Cool and the Crazy had been filmed in its entirety.

Clarke said in an interview with academic film historian Tom Weaver that the film had had three directors: credited director David Bradley, producer O'Dale Ireland and someone who lasted such a short time that he couldn't remember his name. As a result, he said, the actors "mostly directed ourselves." Although the film is listed as being in production for three weeks, Clarke said in the same interview that Dragstrip Riot was actually shot over a six-month period, although the actors were only paid for the contractual three weeks.

Dragstrip Riot was Wray's final film and Clarke's first.

== Distribution ==
Dragstrip Riot was distributed in the US by AIP; in Canada by Astral Pictures; and in the UK by Anglo Amalgamated.

The film was sold twice into US television syndication: in 1965 as part of the 69-film "AIP Package" from Screen Entertainment and again in 1971 by AIP as part of its 26-film "A.I.P. Feature Group" package.

== Reception ==
Dragstrip Riot got mixed reviews from the publications consulted by BoxOffice magazine for its weekly "Review Digest." Film Daily rated it as "good"; BoxOffice, Harrison's Reports and Variety called it "fair"; and The Hollywood Reporter ranked it as "poor." But in terms of audience, the film scored an average of 101 points on the "Boxoffice Barometer," where reports from various cities were compiled on a scale on which 100 points represented "average" box office receipts. Four cities reported above-average scores: Kansas City at 140; Denver and Milwaukee, 125 each; and Buffalo, 115. Detroit had an average score of 100. Below-average scores were recorded in San Francisco and Portland, 90 each; Boston, 75; and Los Angeles, 50.

The BoxOffice review had little to say about the film itself. However, it did note that Dragstrip Riot and The Cool and the Crazy were marketed as a "package." The magazine said that AIP specialized in "those modestly budgeted programmers for which the product-starved exhibitors were screaming. Then to make doubly sure that their product commanded the attention they had foreseen, they started pairing them, thus giving unprecedented importance to the so-called package deals which have proven so financially successful (...)." Comparing the two movies, the anonymous reviewer wrote that "As concerns script, performances, production, etc., it's about a tossup as to which of the offerings in the better."

The movie was given a rather bad review by the Rochester Democrat and Chronicle newspaper. Reviewer JW called it "a hideous little production that maligns teen-agers generally" and wrote that "Besides being a sloppy picture that deals with sick kids, it is a third rate production from the standpoint to cast and direction." It was playing at the time of the review at the Paramount Theater in Rochester on a 10:30 pm "Twin Rock 'N Roll Show" as the first film on a double bill with The Cool and the Crazy.

Academic film historian Peter Stansfeld contrasts the train drag in Dragstrip Riot with the over-the-cliff chicken race in Rebel Without a Cause (1955). He writes that the train drag sequence is constructed in such a way that "filmmakers are tantalizing their audience with thrills" that they don't see. "The movie is thus rendered as a harmless and uncontroversial entertainment," he continues. "The film's lack of affect, however, was more certainly a consequence of the fact the filmmakers did not have the resources to produce the kind of finely-honed cinematic rendering of danger, suspense, and thrills that was achieved in Rebel.

In 2019 film critic Rob Craig described Dragstrip Riot as being a "trite melodrama of the soap opera variety" and "a wheezy, long-winded affair which seems to go on forever."

== Music ==
Music for Dragstrip Riot was composed and conducted by Nicholas Carras, with song lyrics by Carl Eugster. According to the website Ringostrack, the songs "Teenage Rumble," "Rock & Rollin Joe" and "Only One to a Customer" were performed by the Rip Chords. Connie Stevens, accompanied by The Rip Chords, sang "Something New" and "Jamaica Rock."

Although unrelated to the movie, the Seattle alternative rock/punk band The Flesh Eaters released a recording titled "Dragstrip Riot," which is also the title of a song on it. An LP, cassette and CD were issued by SST Records in 1991.
