= They Saved Hitler's Brain =

1968 television film directed by David Bradley

- Original 1963 theatrical release poster
- Written by: Steve Bennett; Peter Miles
- Directed by: David Bradley
- Starring: Walter Stocker; Audrey Caire; Carlos Rivas; John Holland; Marshall Reed
- Music by: Don Hulette
- Country of origin: United States
- Original language: English

Production
- Producer: Carl Edwards
- Cinematography: Stanley Cortez
- Editor: Alan Marks
- Running time: 91 minutes

Original release
- Release: August 18, 1968

They Saved Hitler's Brain is a 1968 TV movie directed by David Bradley. It was adapted for television from a shorter 1963 theatrical feature film, Madmen of Mandoras, directed by Bradley and produced by Carl Edwards. The film was lengthened by about 20 minutes with additional footage shot by UCLA students at the request of the distributor. It is often cited as being one of the worst films ever made.

== Plot ==
World War II is over, and Nazi officials remove Adolf Hitler's living head and hide it in the fictional South American country of Mandoras, so that they can resurrect Nazi Germany in the future. Fast-forwarding into the 1960s, the surviving officials kidnap a scientist with expertise in nerve gas in an attempt to conquer the world. The scientist's son-in-law, who is a security operative, and the scientist's daughter travel to Mandoras to rescue the scientist and foil the evil plot.

== Cast ==
- Walter Stocker as Phil Day
- Audrey Caire as Kathy Coleman "K.C." Day
- Carlos Rivas as Camino Padua / Teo Padua
- John Holland as Prof. John Coleman
- Marshall Reed as Frank Dvorak
- Scott Peters as David Garrick
- Keith Dahle as Tom Sharon
- Dani Lynn as Suzanne Coleman
- Nestor Paiva as Police Chief Alaniz
- Pedro Regas as Presidente Juan Padua
- Bill Freed as Adolf Hitler

== Production ==
Shot in 1962 under the working title The Return of Mr.H, the film was eventually released in 1963 for a limited showing with the title Madmen of Mandoras. Paragon Films acquired the rights to the film and shot 18 more minutes of footage to give a running time of over 90 minutes in order to obtain a higher fee when sold to television where it was included in a package of films.

== Parodies in popular culture ==
=== In The Simpsons ===
- In the season 4 episode Duffless, Hitler's severed head is seen in a jar on a conveyer belt in the Duff Brewery.
- In the season 7 episode, Marge Be Not Proud, one of the video games in the Try-n-Save is titled "Save Hitler's Brain."
- In the season 7 finale, "Raging Abe Simpson and His Grumbling Grandson in The Curse of the Flying Hellfish", Abe Simpson mutters "Now they'll never save your brain, Hitler." before attempting to assassinate Hitler.
- The penultimate episode of the 10th season, "They Saved Lisa's Brain", is a play on the film's title.
- Simpsons Comics referenced the title in the story "They Saved Homer's Brain" in 1996.

=== In other media ===
- In 1986, the film was featured in an episode of the Canned Film Festival.
- In a story arc in Action Comics from 1988, Lex Luthor, learning that he is dying, stages his own death and has his brain preserved in a jar while wired to a computer, while a new body is cloned for him. He then re-emerges as his supposed illegitimate son Alexander Luthor, Jr. The story arc was collected in 2000 in a trade paperback titled They Saved Luthor's Brain!.
- Los Angeles punk band Angry Samoans included the song "They Saved Hitler's Cock" on their 1982 album Back from Samoa.
- An episode of the U.S. cartoon Duckman was entitled "They Craved Duckman's Brain", based on the premise that Duckman, after falling asleep in an active CAT scanner, developed an isotope in his brain that could cure cancer, but getting to it would kill Duckman.
- Local H's album Hallelujah! I'm a Bum includes a song titled "They Saved Reagan's Brain".
- In "Weird Al" Yankovic's 1984 song, "Midnight Star", the second chorus remarks 'They're keeping Hitler's brain alive inside a jar'.

== Reception ==
The film "won" the First World's Worst Film Festival in Ottawa, Canada in 1979. Bradley was reportedly delighted when he learned his film was crowned the worst ever made.

The film review aggregator website Rotten Tomatoes gives They Saved Hitler's Brain a rare rating of 0%, based on 5 reviews from critics, with an average rating of 1.3/10. TV Guide described it as "One of the all-time worst". Film critic Danny Peary said it was "A legitimate candidate for Worst Film Ever Made title." It was also one of the selections for The Golden Turkey Awards. Leonard Maltin gave the film the lowest possible rating (BOMB). Maltin said it was "unbelievably muddled" after the additional footage, but he praised Cortez's cinematography.

== See also ==
- List of films considered the worst
- List of American films of 1963
