= David Bradley (director) =

American film director

David Shedd Bradley (6 April 1920 in Winnetka, Illinois – 19 December 1997 in Los Angeles, California) was an American motion picture director, actor, film collector, and university instructor. He is known for the films 12 to the Moon and They Saved Hitler's Brain (an edited version of Madman of Mandoras and listed as one of the worst films of all time).

== Biography ==
David Shedd Bradley was a grandson of Charles Banks Shedd, a prominent Chicago real estate investor, banker, and financier, and civic leader who also served as an executive officer of the Knickerbocker Ice Company of Chicago, which had been founded principally by Edward Avery Shedd, younger brother of Charles Banks Shedd. He attended the Todd School for Boys (from which Orson Welles had graduated in 1931) from 1935 to 1937, and Lake Forest Academy during 1937–1940. He then spent a year at the Goodman Memorial Theatre Drama Department of the Art Institute of Chicago. During this time, he also directed a feature-length 16 mm version of Peer Gynt with 17-year-old Charlton Heston in the title role; Bradley having known Heston since high school.

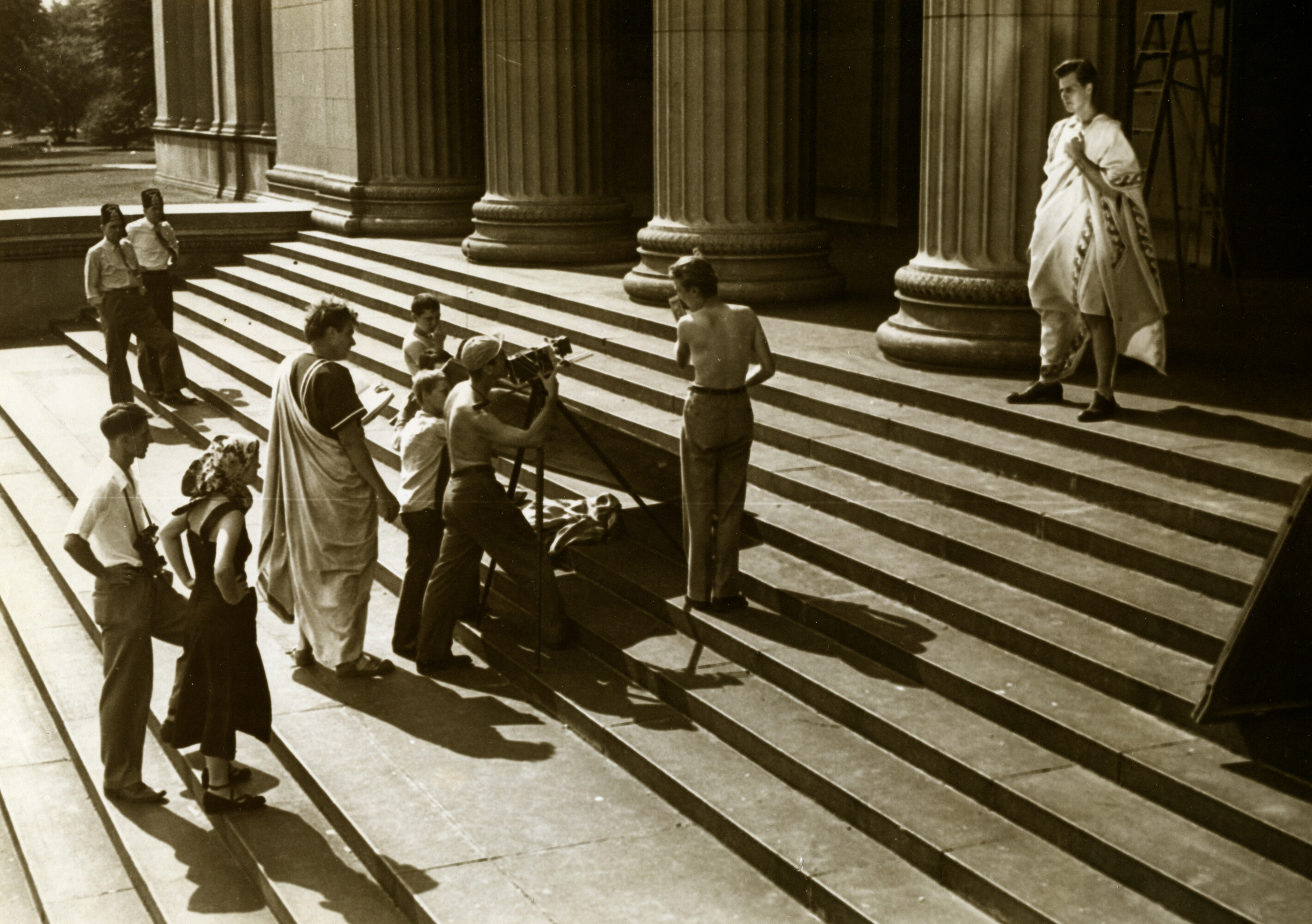
Production shot from Julius Caesar with David Bradley in costume in back of the camera

His studies at Northwestern University were interrupted by three years’ service in the U.S. Army Signal Corps motion picture section during World War II. He worked as a combat photographer during the European campaign, eventually filming the arrival of the Allies in Paris.

He graduated in 1950 with Bachelor of Science degree from the university's School of Speech. On the basis of the 16 mm feature Julius Caesar that he had produced and directed in Chicago (and which also starred Charlton Heston), he was hired as a directing intern by Metro-Goldwyn-Mayer in 1950.

== Later years ==
After the teen drama Dragstrip Riot (1958), he went on to direct Madmen of Mandoras, padded for television into the infamous They Saved Hitler's Brain, which proved to be his final output.

Bradley later taught film studies at UCLA and Santa Monica City College.

== Filmography ==
Year	Film	Director	Writer	Producer	Note
1938	Treasure Island	Yes	No	No	
1940	'Sredni Vashtar' by Saki	Yes	No	No	Short
1941	Peer Gynt	Yes	Yes	No	
1950	Julius Caesar	Yes	Yes	Yes	
1952	Talk About a Stranger	Yes	No	No	
1958	Dragstrip Riot	Yes	No	No	
1960	12 to the Moon	Yes	No	No	riffed by satirical cult sci-fi series Mystery Science Theater 3000
1968	They Saved Hitler's Brain	Yes	No	No	originally released as Madmen of Mandoras in 1963
