= Gary Clarke =

American actor (born 1933)

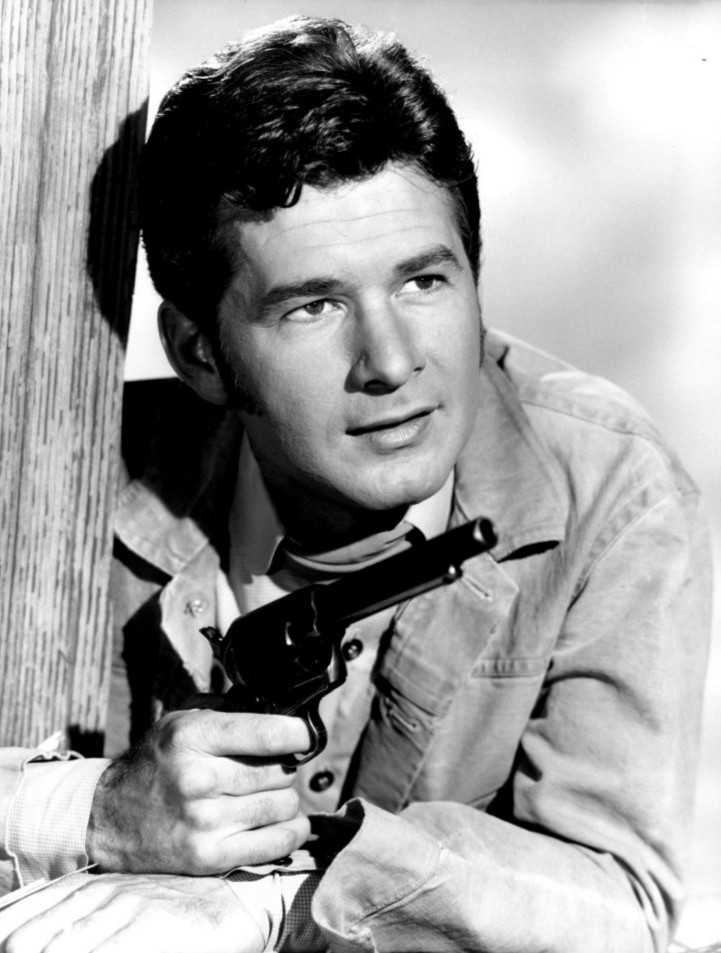
- Clarke as Steve Hill on The Virginian
- Born: Clarke Frederick L'Amoreaux; August 16, 1933 (age 92); Los Angeles, California, U.S.
- Occupation: Actor
- Known for: Michael Shayne and The Virginian
- Spouse(s): Marilyn (1954-bef. 1964); Pat Woodell (1964-bef. 1978) Jerrene (1991-present)
- Children: 5

Gary Clarke (born Clarke Frederick L'Amoreaux; August 16, 1933) is an American actor best known for his role as Steve Hill in the NBC Western television series The Virginian with James Drury and Doug McClure.

== Early life ==
Clarke was born in Los Angeles, California, of French and Mexican heritage, and grew up in the predominantly Chicano neighborhood of East Los Angeles. While in high school, he began pursuing the idea of an acting career, and after graduation won a role in a community theater play in San Gabriel, California. This led to work in a series of plays in Glendale. During this time, Clarke was working as a machinist in San Gabriel, as well as a newspaper deliveryman.

== Film and television career ==
Clarke began his screen career with the 1958 film Dragstrip Riot, recalling that agent Byron Griffith, who had seen him perform in Glendale, arranged for an audition that eventually led to his filling the lead role. Clarke recalled:

I drove from San Gabriel to Hollywood and read for the part, and I got in as a member of the good gang. I went back to work the next day and my agent called me again and he said, 'Gary, they have just lost the lead in the movie. Can you get down here?' Yes! So I ... went home [from work] and changed and went down, and I read every day for five days. I didn't go back to work, I just kept calling in sick.

He went on to work in other films, including How to Make a Monster, and Missile to the Moon (both 1958), Date Bait (1960), and Passion Street, U.S.A. (1964). He has said he was a contract player at Universal Pictures.

In the 1960-1961 season, he appeared as Dick Hamilton in the single-season NBC television series Michael Shayne, based on the fictional private detective character created by Brett Halliday, opposite Richard Denning as the title character. Afterward, he appeared as Tad Kimball, a friend of the character Jess Harper, played by Robert Fuller, in the episode "The Fatal Step" of the NBC Western series Laramie.

Clarke played Steve Hill in the cast of the long-running TV Western series The Virginian, remaining on the show from 1962 to 1964. His last series as a cast-member was the 1967 ABC Western Hondo, playing Captain Richards.

Clarke said in an interview that his friend and co-star Steve Ihnat and he wrote the screenplay for director Ted V. Mikels' film Strike Me Deadly (1963), though the film's credits list only Ihnat and Mikels. Later that decade, Clarke under his birth name wrote several scripts for the NBC espionage sitcom Get Smart, which introduced the running character Hymie the Robot. All but one of his six produced scripts for the series("Appointment in Sahara") is about Hymie.

In the 1980s and 1990s, he wrote and produced television public-service announcements including "Youth at Risk", narrated nonfiction short films including "Promoting Healthy Behavior", and appeared in TV series including Dynasty and The Young Riders, in which he had a four-episode recurring role. His films in the 2010s include The Paperboy (2012), and Parkland (2013) in which he played Admiral George Burkley.

In 2014, the production company L'Amoreaux/Bartlett/Race/Thomas sought actors for an independent TV pilot, Bandits and Tadpoles, written by Bartlett and Thomas and directed by Clarke, about a young boy whose daydreams put him in the American Old West of the Owen Wister novel The Virginian. It filmed June 26–30, 2014, near Austin, Texas, under the title Billy and the Bandit, with a cast including James Drury and Roberta Shore, from Clarke's old series The Virginian; 11-year-old Jordan Elsass as Billy; Ava L'Amoreaux and Donny Boaz as his parents; and Buck Taylor as a ranch foreman.

== Singing career ==
While a cast-member of Michael Shayne, Clarke released the single "Tomorrow May Never Come", backed with "One Way Ticket", for RCA Victor Records. While on The Virginian, he sang a cover of the theme song, backed with "One Summer in a Million", for Decca Records.

== Personal life ==
In July 2003, Clarke and Drury, along with two other The Virginian co-stars, Roberta Shore and singer Randy Boone, were guests at the Western Film Fair in Charlotte, North Carolina.

Clarke was a teenager when he married his first wife, Marilyn, and the couple had three boys within three years, Jeff, Dennis, and David. Clarke's second wife was Petticoat Junction actress Pat Woodell, but they later divorced. He married his third wife, Jerrene, in 1991. They have two daughters, Ava and Natalie.

As of 2011, Clarke resided in Austin, Texas.

== The Virginian episodes ==
Clarke appeared in these 45 episodes from 1962 to 1964:

- The Executioners (September 19, 1962)
- Woman from White Wing (September 26, 1962)
- Throw a Long Rope (October 3, 1962)
- The Big Deal (October 10, 1962)
- The Brazen Bell (October 17, 1962)
- Big Day, Great Day (October 24, 1962)
- Riff-Raff (November 7, 1962)
- Impasse (November 14, 1962)
- It Tolls for Thee (November 21, 1962)
- The Devil's Children (December 5, 1962)
- 50 Days to Moose Jaw (December 12, 1962)
- The Accomplice (December 19, 1962)
- The Man from the Sea (December 26, 1962)
- Duel at Shiloh (January 2, 1963)
- The Exiles (January 9, 1963)
- Say Goodbye to All That (January 23, 1963)
- The Man Who Wouldn't Die (January 30, 1963)
- The Small Parade (February 20, 1963)
- The Money Cage (March 6, 1963)
- A Distant Fury (March 20, 1963)
- Run Away Home (April 24, 1963)
- Ride a Dark Trail (September 18, 1963)
- A Killer in Town (October 9, 1963)
- The Evil That Men Do (October 16, 1963)
- It Takes a Big Man (October 23, 1963)
- Brother Thaddeus (October 30, 1963)
- A Portrait of Marie Valonne (November 6, 1963)
- Run Quiet (November 13, 1963)
- Stopover in a Western Town (November 27, 1963)
- The Fatal Journey (December 4, 1963)
- A Time Remembered (December 11, 1963)
- The Invaders (January 1, 1964)
- Roar from the Mountain (January 8, 1964)
- The Thirty Days of Gavin Heath (January 22, 1964)
- The Drifter (January 29, 1964)
- First to Thine Own Self (February 12, 1964)
- Smile of a Dragon (February 26, 1964)
- Another's Footsteps (March 11, 1964)
- Rope of Lies (March 25, 1964)
- A Bride for Lars (April 15, 1964)
- Dark Destiny (April 29, 1964) l
- A Man Called Kane (May 6, 1964)
- Felicity's Spring (October 14, 1964)
- Big Image... Little Man (October 28, 1964)
- The Girl from Yesterday (November 11, 1964)

== Other Selected Filmography ==
- Alfred Hitchcock Presents (1958) (Season 3 Episode 17: "The Motive") as Bellboy

"The Young Riders" (1991), Season 3, Episode 4, "Between Rock Creek and a Hard Place" as Union Colonel
