= The Cool and the Crazy =

1958 film

- Film poster by Albert Kallis
- Directed by: William Witney
- Written by: Richard C. Sarafian
- Produced by: Elmer C. Rhoden Jr.
- Starring: Scott Marlowe; Richard Bakalyan; Gigi Perreau
- Cinematography: Harry Birch
- Edited by: Helene Turner
- Music by: Raoul Kraushaar; Dave Kahn (uncredited)
- Distributed by: American International Pictures (AIP)
- Release date: 1958
- Running time: 78 minutes
- Country: United States
- Language: English

The Cool and the Crazy is a 1958 American teen drama film directed by William Witney that was distributed by American-International Pictures as a double feature with Dragstrip Riot. It stars Scott Marlowe and Gigi Perreau.

== Plot ==
The Cool and the Crazy tells the story of Ben Saul, a reform school graduate who is transferred to a Kansas City high school. There, Ben's clowning in class ticks off the local gang of tough guys, but he soon wins all of their admiration when he begins buying them beer, taking them to dances, giving them "kicks," and then finally turning them on to marijuana. Ben is working as a frontman for a local marijuana ring, but the local police detective is hot on his trail. When a marijuana-crazed addict teenager whom Ben has sold the drug to dies trying to hold up a filling station for drug money, the police question him and events begin to spiral out of Ben's control. In the dramatic (or melodramatic) finale, Ben ends up killing the pusher for more marijuana only to find that there is none, and gets his just deserts in a fiery car wreck. Then there is an obligatory moralizing segment, where a policeman screams at the surviving addicts, "Is this what you call 'kicks'?! Sooner or later, if you don't wise up you're all gonna wind up like this, one way or the other."

== Cast ==
- Scott Marlowe as Bennie Saul
- Richard Bakalyan as Jackie Barzan
- Gigi Perreau as Amy
- Dickie Jones as Stu Summerville
- Shelby Storck as Detective Lt. Sloan
- Anthony Pawley as Mr. Saul
- Chrystle Pawley as the girl in the "Blue Note" Cafe who spoke the line "Jackie, you have a telephone call." She was the wife of Anthony Pawley, and her name is listed immediately below Anthony's name in the credits at the end of the movie.

== Background ==
The producer of the film, Elmer Rhoden Jr., was president of the Kansas City, Missouri-based Commonwealth Theaters, a prominent chain of motion picture theaters with outlets in Missouri, Kansas, Arkansas, Iowa, Nebraska, and South Dakota. In 1956, Rhoden Jr. had established a small film complex in Kansas City to produce low-budget teen exploitation films for the teenage audiences, primarily for showing in drive-in theaters. After finding success with juvenile delinquency melodrama The Delinquents, directed by Kansas City filmmaker Robert Altman, which was sold to United Artists and released in 1957, grossing $1,000,000, Rhoden Jr. put up about $170,000 for a second film in Kansas City. Rhoden Jr. began with a title: The Cool and the Crazy, and hired Richard C. Sarafian, a Kansas City writer and friend of Altman's, to write the screenplay for the film.

== Production ==
The film was shot in about two or three weeks on-location in Kansas City sometime in the latter part of 1957. Locations included a Kansas City high school, where most of the students appeared as cameos, a run-down Aberdeen Hotel in downtown Kansas City, a greasy spoon called Pat's Pig, Penn Valley Park and the Indian Scout Statue overlooking the city, the Blue Note Club, the Kansas City Jazz hall, and several real homes and neighborhoods. Rhoden Jr. had cooperation from many local businesses and also from the Kansas City Police Department, who were contacted for several reasons.

While standing on the street between takes, actors Dick Bakalyan and Dick Jones were arrested for vagrancy by Kansas City police. They spent several hours in the local jail before someone explained that they were just acting for a film.

As with The Delinquents, Rhoden Jr. had The Cool and the Crazy post-production and editing executed under professional conditions in Hollywood by Helene Turner. Rhoden Jr. also now had enough money to order an original music score, written and conducted by film composer Raoul Kraushaar. Kraushaar's score featured recurring versions of the film's theme song, some which were done in a fast tempo and beat, and other versions that were performed in a slower, bluesier style.

Rhoden Jr. agreed a distribution deal with American International Pictures. AIP made no mention of the drug plot in the trailer or on the poster, and tagged on disclaimers at the beginning and end assuring parents that this was a film made for the purpose of warning teenagers about drugs. The film was released in the spring of 1958, with the "gala world premiere" in Kansas City, accompanied by a live radio broadcast, house lights, live music, a dance contest, and a parade of the Kansas Citians involved in the film.

== Legacy ==
The Cool and the Crazy was a box-office success, grossing more than $5 million for AIP and was hailed as one of the most popular delinquency films of 1958.

The Cool and the Crazy has recently gained a devoted cult following for its rabid anti-marijuana message and Dick Bakalyan's performance. It first began to be shown on television in the 1970s, when it first began to attract its following, and was released on video the next decade.
