= The Delinquents (1957 film) =

1957 film by Robert Altman

- Theatrical release poster
- Directed by: Robert Altman
- Written by: Robert Altman
- Produced by: Elmer Rhoden Jr. Robert Altman
- Starring: Tom Laughlin; Peter Miller; Richard Bakalyan
- Cinematography: Charles Paddock
- Edited by: Helene Turner
- Music by: Gene Garf; Louis Palange
- Distributed by: United Artists
- Release date: March 1, 1957
- Running time: 72 minutes
- Country: United States
- Language: English
- Budget: $63,000
- Box office: $1,000,000

The Delinquents is a 1957 American drama film written, produced, and directed by Robert Altman. As the directorial debut of Altman, he filmed it in his hometown of Kansas City, Missouri during the summer of 1956 on a $63,000 budget (equivalent to $746,000 in 2025). It is not only the first film Altman directed, but also the first to star Tom Laughlin.

== Plot ==
In suburban Kansas City, a group of hot-rod greasers and carousing delinquents stir trouble in a bar when they are denied drinks. Cholly and Eddy, the leaders of the gang, respond by breaking a window. Meanwhile, 18-year-old Scotty White and 16-year-old Janice Wilson are very much in love, but her parents stand between them because Janice is "too young to go steady" and Scotty "hangs out with the wrong crowd", with her dad telling him to stay away. Scotty, going to college in the fall, is told he could talk to them about seeing her when he comes back for Christmas vacation. At the drive-in alone that night, Scotty gets wrongly targeted by a gang who are looking for the person who slashed one of their tires. Cholly comes to Scotty's rescue. Cholly cooks up the idea of posing as Janice's new boyfriend and bringing her to meet Scotty the next night. The plan works well, and the teen crowd all meet at an abandoned mansion on the edge of town. However, the party gets out of hand with wild drinking and dancing, and Scotty and Janice leave to be alone after Cholly and Eddy each dance suggestively with Janice.

Soon after, the police mysteriously appear and break up the drunken free-for-all. Cholly and his right-hand-delinquent Eddy suspect Scotty of tipping off the police, and the whole gang kidnaps Scotty the next day and force him to gulp down an entire bottle of Scotch when he won't admit to being the informant. In panic after Scotty passes out from drinking, the gang begins to drive him out to the country with the intention of abandoning him on the side of the road but on the way they pull into a service station to get some gas. Eddy decides to hold up the station, but Scotty unknowingly bungles it when he wakes up. Cholly hits the station attendant on the head with a gas pump, and the gang speeds off, leaving Scotty behind with the cash and the attendant. Scotty staggers home, finds the gang has kidnapped Janice, has several fights, and then has a switchblade fight with Cholly (told by a psychotic Eddy to kill Scotty to kill the only witness) in a home kitchen. Wounded, Scotty then goes to the police as the Whites and Wilsons reclaim their kids.

The film, which had started with a voiceover describing it as a tale of violence and immorality, ends with a voiceover:

“This is one story. Who's to blame? The answers are not easy, nor are they pleasant. We are all responsible, and it's our responsibility not to look the other way. Violence and immorality like this must be controlled, channeled. Citizens everywhere must work against delinquency, just as they work against cancer, cerebral palsy, or any other crippling disease. For delinquency is a disease. But the remedies are available: patience, compassion, understanding, and respect for parental and civil authority. By working with your church group, with a youth organization in your town, by paying closer attention to the needs of your children, you can help prevent the recurrence of regrettable events like the ones you have just witnessed. You can help halt the disease before it cripples our children, before it cripples society.”

== Cast ==
- Tom Laughlin as Scotty White
- Peter Miller as Bill Cholly
- Richard Bakalyan as Eddy
- Rosemary Howard as Janice Wilson
- Leonard Belove and Helen Hawley as Mr. and Mrs. White
- James Lantz and Lotus Corelli as Mr. and Mrs. Wilson
- Christine Altman as Sissy Wilson

== Production ==
=== Background ===
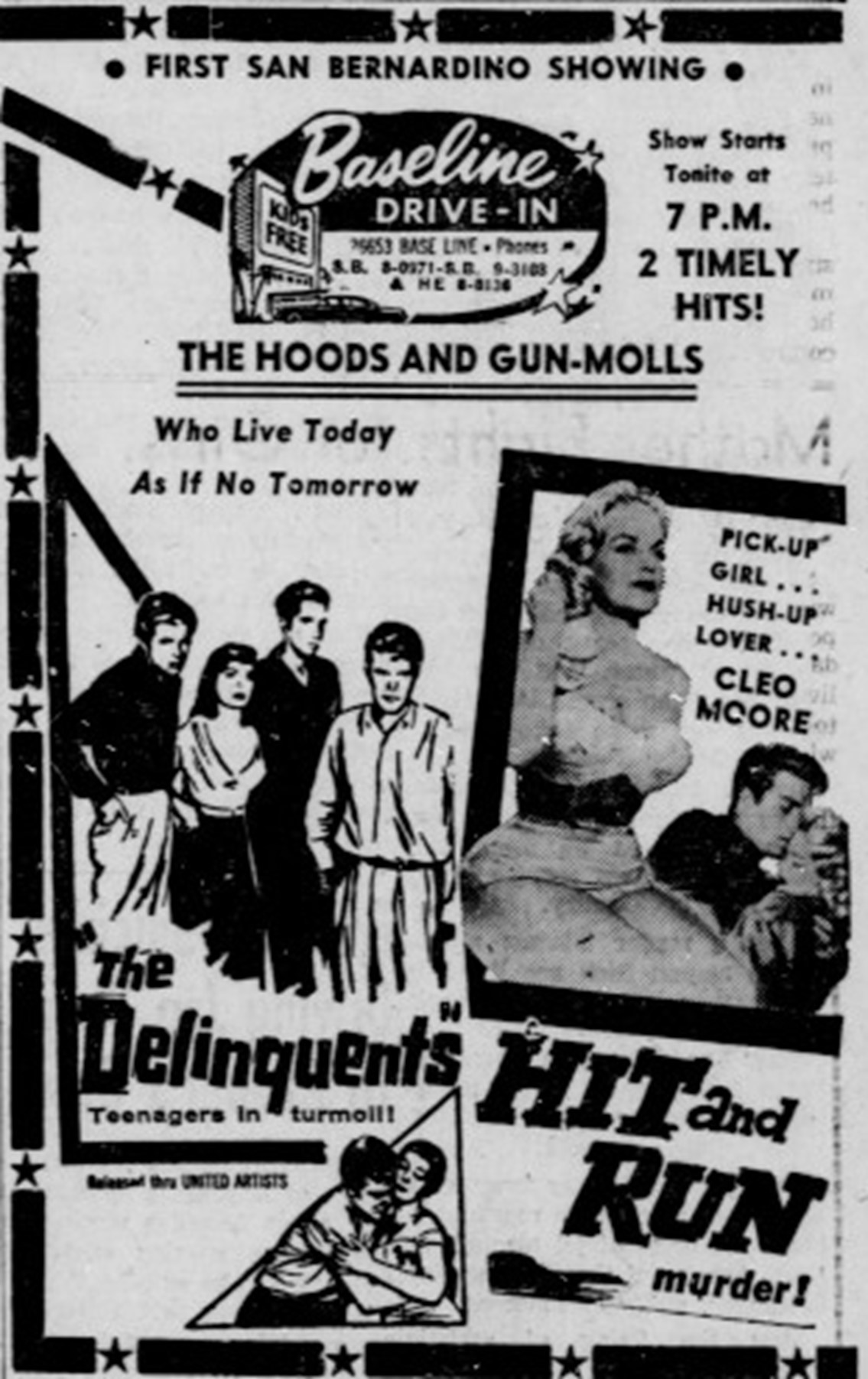
Drive-in advertisement from 1957 for The Delinquents and co-feature, Hit and Run.

Elmer Rhoden Jr. was a Kansas City motion picture theater exhibitor, president of the prominent Commonwealth Theaters chain in Missouri, Kansas, Arkansas, Iowa, Oklahoma, and South Dakota. Rhoden wanted to get into producing films. He had the distributing apparatus at hand and the necessary capital to invest. Although television was drawing viewers out of the theaters, teenagers still frequented theaters, and, soon, film producers realized that there was a large "teen market" they could tap into. During the mid-to-late 1950s, following the success of movies by American International Pictures aimed at the teenage market such as Shake, Rattle & Rock! and Hot Rod Girl, a huge wave of films, often referred to as exploitation films, were later produced by the major Hollywood studios and independents alike. Common subjects of 1950s teen films included juvenile delinquency, rock and roll, horror, science fiction, and hot rods. Rhoden Jr. was one of the first independent exhibitors to note these shifts in the film industry and was determined to make it work for his business.

Due to the "consent decree" component of the "Paramount Ruling", the major studios were constrained from booking their own chains by this antitrust ruling. But the Commonwealth circuit and other small regional independent film companies, by virtue of not having previously existed as film producers, were exempt from this rule. It was the beginning of the days of the low-budget regional filmmaker, and Rhoden figured that if he budgeted his "teen-flicks" cheaply enough and peddled them to his own Commonwealth chain, he would be guaranteed a tidy profit. So, in the spring of 1956, he raised $63,000 with the help of other local businessmen in Kansas City, decided his first teen film would be about troubled teens, thought up a title for it and nothing else, and hired local filmmaker Robert Altman (who knew Rhoden Jr. casually and had been directing industrial films and documentaries for the local Calvin Company) to write and direct the film.

Using several starting points such as Blackboard Jungle, The Wild One, and Rebel Without a Cause for influence, Altman wrote the screenplay for The Delinquents in five to seven days.

=== Casting ===
Rhoden approved the script and gave Altman the go-ahead on the casting, scouting of locations, and so forth. For much of the cast, Altman turned to the local Kansas City actors with whom he had worked in community theater and in industrial films, including James Lantz, Leonard Belove, and Kermit Echols, as well as his then-wife Lotus Corelli and his eight-year-old daughter Christine. However, hoping for a Hollywood-style film, Altman and Rhoden took a trip to California and cast for the three leads there. They came up with Peter Miller from Blackboard Jungle to play Cholly, and Richard Bakalyan to play Eddy. Tom Laughlin was cast in the lead role of Scotty, here making his film debut. Altman and Rhoden also came back from California with soundman Bob Post and camera operator Harry Birch.

Altman employed his friends and Calvin co-workers on the crew, including Reza Badiyi as assistant director/associate producer and his sister Joan as production manager. Altman scouted locations in Kansas City and chose to film in Loose Park, as well as at the Jewel Box Nightclub, one of his favorite hangouts, and also at several popular local teen hangouts including the Crest Drive-In Theater (which Rhoden owned) and Allen's Drive-In. Through Kansas City native George Kuhn, one of the actors in the teenage gang in the film, Altman secured the temporary use of two houses to be those of Scotty and Janice in the film. One of them was Kuhn's and his parents', the other was his neighbors'.

=== Filming ===
Altman filmed The Delinquents in three weeks during the summer of 1956. Although Rhoden was officially the executive producer, Altman did most of that type of work himself. As Altman said years later, "I wrote the thing in five days, cast it, picked the locations, drove the generator truck, got the people together, took no money, and we just did it, that's all". Altman had the cooperation of local businesses as well as the Kansas City Police Department. Altman and Rhoden had actually gone to the police to make sure their portrayal of delinquents and their problems was accurate, and also contacted them in order to receive their cooperation for blocking off streets and using the police station for certain scenes. They also used real police officers as actors in the film.

Altman's film crew was made up mostly of his Calvin co-workers. Calvin photographer Charles Paddock was director of photography, and Badiyi was assistant director. Calvin artist and designer (and Altman's brother-in-law) Chet Allen was art director, and Altman's sister Joan served in a production executive (such as script girl) while Altman's wife (Lotus Corelli) and daughter Christine also starred in the film. Also with Altman's Kansas City crew were Californians Harry Birch (camera operator) and Bob Post (sound recorder).

Laughlin was cast after Altman consulted the only agent he had in Bob Longnecker, who had Laughlin as a client. Laughlin and Altman had conflicting theories of acting. To Altman, Laughlin was "an unbelievable pain in the ass", guilty that he had not become a priest, "with a big Catholic hangup and a James Dean complex". There was one particular incident where Altman was ready to shoot a scene in which Laughlin was supposed to appear physically exhausted, and Laughlin excused himself with, "I've got to get in the mood now". Laughlin then insisted on running around the block a couple of times while cast and crew cooled their heels. Laughlin was attempting to do "everything he'd heard about James Dean doing", but when Laughlin's attempts at method acting were not welcomed by the rest of the cast or crew, he wanted to quit the film. Altman then worked out a compromise for communication whereby Altman would tell Laughlin exactly what he wanted in any given scene. According to Altman, Laughlin "performed the last half of the picture under protest". Laughlin, who described himself not as a Method actor but a "Stanislavsky actor", described the production as "very amateurish", disapproving of the lack of organization in Altman, with one instance involving Laughlin deciding to roll the cameras himself and shoot a scene rather than wait for Altman to show up for the crew (as he felt guilt over the fact that the production was on Rhoden’s money), which began the seeds of Laughlin starting to become a director.

Altman's experimental directing style was still developing, but one sign of his future directorial achievements can be seen in a story told by one of Altman's young cast members, SuEllen Fried, about the shooting of a party scene in the film: "He rented an old house off Walworth Boulevard and told us to pretend we were having the wildest party of our lives, while he moved the camera from room to room and just filmed whatever was going on. We didn't know when the camera was going. We were just having a wild party". Altman (who described writing the film as one done over a weekend that he dictated to his sister Joan that would see the scenes improvised on set) expressed his thoughts about doing a script as one where he tried to avoid the characters having the same voice, where the distinction in sources and voices seemed closer to reality that would push the actor into creating the part rather than having the writer or director just bring the elements prepackaged, which only works out if the actor is willing to take the responsibility.

=== Post-production ===
Finally, The Delinquents has also been noted (and praised) for its "technical excellence", particularly the quality of the black-and-white photography. Director of photography Charles Paddock said that, just before beginning filming on The Delinquents, Altman advised him to watch the film The Asphalt Jungle and imitate that style of lighting.

The filming was completed by August 1956. In his contract with Rhoden, Altman had a clause stipulating that the film's post-production and editing would be executed under professional conditions in Hollywood. In late August, Altman and Reza Badiyi traveled across the country by car (Rhoden would not approve the air fare) to edit the film in California with Helene Turner. Fred Brown contributed the sound effects.

The finished film was picked up for distribution by United Artists for $150,000, who wanted a teenage exploitation film in order to compete with the other studios. United Artists altered the ending a bit and added a moralistic narration by a stock actor at the beginning and end. Altman did not find out until he saw a preview of the film, and was not impressed.

== Release and legacy ==
The Delinquents received its "gala world premiere" in Kansas City in February 1957. The showing of the film was preceded by live music, a dance contest, and a parade of Corvettes carrying residents who had worked on the film. It was all covered by a live radio broadcast and the theater's house lights were brought out.

The film was rejected by the British Board of Film Classification in 1957. United Artists released the film worldwide the next month. The film's release was not wide, and it played mostly in drive-ins. However, it did gross $1,000,000 for United Artists. When Alfred Hitchcock saw the film, he was apparently impressed enough to give Altman a job directing episodes of Alfred Hitchcock Presents, which led to more television work for Altman over the next decade.

Rhoden produced one more film in Kansas City (The Cool and the Crazy) and was featured in TIME as one of the "new wave" of producers. He then produced a delinquency film in Hollywood, Daddy-O, but his mini-mogul reign was short-lived. An alcoholic who drank heavily, he died in 1959 at the age of 37 three months after suffering a heart attack.

== Home media ==
As of April 29, 2011, the film has been released on DVD-R via Amazon.com.

== See also ==
- List of American films of 1957
- List of hood films
