= List of film noir titles =

Film genre list

Film noir is not a clearly defined genre (see here for details on the characteristics). Therefore, the composition of this list may be controversial. To minimize dispute the films included here should preferably feature a footnote linking to a reliable, published source which states that the mentioned film is considered to be a film noir by an expert in this field, e.g.^{[a]}^{[b]}^{[c]}^{[d]}

The terms which are used below to subsume various periods and variations of film noir are not definitive and are meant as a navigational aid rather than as critical argument. Because the 1940s and 1950s are universally regarded as the "classic period" of American film noir, films released prior to 1940 are listed under the caption "Precursors / early noir-like films". Films released after 1959 should generally only be listed in the list of neo-noir titles.

== Precursors / early noir-like films ==
=== 1927 ===
- Underworld^{[c]}

=== 1928 ===
- The Racket^{[c]}

=== 1929 ===
- Thunderbolt^{[c]}

=== 1931 ===
- The Big Gamble
- City Streets^{[c]}
- Little Caesar^{[c]}
- The Maltese Falcon (a.k.a. Dangerous Female)^{[i]}
- The Public Enemy^{[c]}
- Quick Millions^{[c]}
- The Secret Six^{[i]}

=== 1932 ===
- 20,000 Years in Sing Sing^{[g]}
- The Beast of the City^{[c]}
- I Am a Fugitive from a Chain Gang^{[b]}^{[c]}
- Payment Deferred^{[b]}
- Scarface^{[c]}
- Two Seconds^{[b]}
- Under-Cover Man

=== 1933 ===
- Advice to the Lovelorn^{[i]}
- Blood Money^{[c]}
- Private Detective 62

=== 1934 ===
- Crime Without Passion^{[b]}^{[i]}
- Journal of a Crime^{[i]}
- Midnight^{[i]}
- The Thin Man^{[i]}

=== 1935 ===
- Bordertown^{[i]}
- Crime and Punishment
- G Men^{[c]}
- The Glass Key^{[i]}
- The Scoundrel^{[b]}^{[c]}^{[i]}

=== 1936 ===
- Bullets or Ballots^{[i]}
- Fury^{[b]}^{[c]}
- The Petrified Forest^{[i]}
- Satan Met a Lady^{[g]}

=== 1937 ===
- Dead End^{[c]}
- Marked Woman^{[g]}
- You Only Live Once^{[b]}^{[c]}

=== 1938 ===
- Angels with Dirty Faces^{[c]}
- You and Me^{[i]}

=== 1939 ===
- Blind Alley^{[a]}^{[b]}
- Each Dawn I Die^{[c]}
- King of the Underworld
- Let Us Live^{[a]}^{[b]}
- Rio^{[a]}^{[b]}
- The Roaring Twenties^{[g]}
- They Made Me a Criminal^{[g]}

=== 1940 ===
- Angels Over Broadway^{[b]}
- City for Conquest^{[d]}
- Johnny Apollo

=== Non-American ===
- La Chienne (1931, France)^{[e]}
- M (1931, Germany)^{[e]}
- Das Testament des Dr. Mabuse (The Testament of Dr. Mabuse) (1933, Germany)
- La Bandera (Escape from Yesterday) (1935, France)
- The Green Cockatoo (1937, United Kingdom)^{[e]}^{[f]}
- Pépé le Moko (1937, France)^{[e]}
- La Bête Humaine (The Human Beast) (1938, France)^{[e]}
- Hôtel du Nord (1938, France)^{[e]}
- Le Quai des brumes (Port of Shadows) (1938, France)^{[e]}^{[f]}
- They Drive by Night (1938, United Kingdom)^{[e]}^{[f]}
- Dead Men are Dangerous (a.k.a. Dangerous Masquerade) (1938, United Kingdom)^{[g]}
- Le Dernier tournant (The Last Turning) (1939, France)^{[e]}^{[f]}
- Le Jour se lève (Daybreak) (1939, France)^{[e]}^{[f]}
- On the Night of the Fire (a.k.a. The Fugitive) (1939, United Kingdom)^{[f]}
- Pièges (Personal Column) (1939, France)^{[g]}

== Classic American noir ==
=== 1940 ===
- The Letter^{[b]}^{[c]}
- Rebecca^{[b]}
- Stranger on the Third Floor — horror noir ^{[b]}^{[c]}
- They Drive by Night^{[b]}

=== 1941 ===
- Among the Living^{[b]}^{[c]}
- Blues in the Night^{[b]}
- High Sierra^{[b]}^{[c]}
- I Wake Up Screaming^{[b]}^{[c]}
- Johnny Eager^{[c]}
- Ladies in Retirement^{[b]}
- The Maltese Falcon^{[b]}^{[c]}
- Out of the Fog^{[b]}
- Rage in Heaven^{[b]}
- The Shanghai Gesture^{[b]}^{[c]}
- Suspicion^{[b]}^{[c]}
- A Woman's Face^{[b]}

=== 1942 ===
- Crossroads^{[b]}
- The Glass Key^{[b]}^{[c]}
- Moontide^{[b]}
- Street of Chance^{[b]}^{[c]}
- This Gun for Hire^{[b]}^{[c]}

=== 1943 ===
- Calling Dr. Death^{[d]}
- The Fallen Sparrow^{[b]}^{[c]}
- Journey into Fear^{[b]}^{[c]}
- The Seventh Victim^{[b]}
- Shadow of a Doubt^{[b]}^{[c]}
- Whispering Footsteps^{[b]}^{[d]}

=== 1944 ===
- Bluebeard^{[b]}^{[d]}
- Christmas Holiday^{[b]}^{[c]}
- Dangerous Passage^{[d]}
- Dark Waters^{[b]}^{[c]}
- Destiny^{[a]}^{[b]}
- Double Indemnity^{[b]}^{[c]}
- Experiment Perilous^{[b]}
- Gaslight^{[b]}
- Guest in the House (a.k.a. Satan in Skirts)^{[b]}^{[c]}
- Lady in the Death House^{[a]}
- Laura^{[b]}^{[c]}
- The Lodger^{[b]}
- The Mark of the Whistler - Whistler series^{[a]}^{[b]}
- The Mask of Dimitrios^{[b]}^{[c]}
- Ministry of Fear^{[b]}^{[c]}
- Murder, My Sweet (a.k.a. Farewell, My Lovely)^{[b]}^{[c]}
- Phantom Lady^{[b]}^{[c]}
- Strangers in the Night^{[a]}^{[b]}
- The Suspect^{[b]}^{[d]}
- Voice in the Wind^{[b]}^{[d]}
- When Strangers Marry (a.k.a. Betrayed)^{[b]}^{[c]}
- The Whistler - Whistler series^{[a]}^{[b]}
- The Woman in the Window^{[b]}^{[c]}

=== 1945 ===
- Apology for Murder^{[a]}^{[d]}
- Bewitched^{[b]}^{[c]}
- Circumstantial Evidence^{[b]}
- Conflict^{[b]}^{[c]}
- Cornered^{[b]}^{[c]}
- Danger Signal^{[b]}^{[c]}
- Dangerous Intruder^{[a]}
- Detour^{[b]}^{[c]}
- Escape in the Fog^{[b]}^{[d]}
- Fallen Angel^{[b]}^{[c]}
- The Great Flamarion^{[a]}^{[d]}
- Hangover Square^{[b]}^{[d]}
- The House on 92nd Street^{[b]}^{[c]}
- Jealousy^{[a]}^{[b]}
- Johnny Angel^{[b]}^{[c]}
- The Lady Confesses^{[a]}^{[d]}
- The Lost Weekend
- Mildred Pierce^{[b]}^{[c]}
- My Name is Julia Ross^{[b]}^{[c]}
- The Power of the Whistler - Whistler series^{[a]}^{[b]}
- Scarlet Street^{[b]}^{[c]}
- Spellbound^{[b]}^{[c]}
- The Spider^{[a]}^{[b]}
- The Strange Affair of Uncle Harry^{[b]}^{[c]}
- Strange Illusion (a.k.a. Out of the Night)^{[b]}^{[c]}
- Two O'Clock Courage^{[b]}^{[d]}
- The Unseen^{[b]}
- Voice of the Whistler - Whistler series^{[a]}^{[b]}

=== 1946 ===
- Accomplice^{[a]}
- The Big Sleep^{[b]}^{[c]}
- Black Angel^{[b]}^{[c]}
- The Blue Dahlia^{[b]}^{[c]}
- The Chase^{[b]}^{[c]}
- Crack-Up^{[b]}^{[c]}
- Criminal Court^{[a]}
- The Dark Corner^{[b]}^{[c]}
- The Dark Mirror^{[b]}^{[c]}
- Deadline at Dawn^{[b]}^{[c]}
- Deception^{[b]}
- Decoy^{[b]}^{[c]}
- Fear^{[b]}^{[c]}
- Gilda^{[b]}^{[c]}
- The Glass Alibi^{[a]}^{[b]}
- Her Kind of Man^{[b]}
- Humoresque^{[b]}
- Inside Job^{[a]}^{[b]}
- The Killers^{[b]}^{[c]}
- The Locket^{[b]}^{[c]}
- The Mask of Diijon^{[a]}^{[b]}
- Mysterious Intruder - Whistler series^{[a]}^{[d]}
- The Mysterious Mr. Valentine^{[a]}
- Night Editor^{[b]}^{[c]}
- Nobody Lives Forever^{[b]}^{[c]}
- Nocturne^{[b]}^{[c]}
- Notorious^{[b]}^{[c]}
- The Postman Always Rings Twice^{[b]}^{[c]}
- The Secret of the Whistler - Whistler series^{[a]}^{[b]}
- Shadow of a Woman^{[b]}
- Shock — horror noir ^{[b]}^{[c]}
- Smooth as Silk^{[m]}
- So Dark the Night^{[b]}^{[c]}
- Somewhere in the Night^{[b]}^{[c]}
- Specter of the Rose^{[a]}^{[b]}
- The Spiral Staircase^{[b]}^{[d]}
- Strange Impersonation^{[b]}
- The Strange Love of Martha Ivers^{[b]}^{[c]}
- Strange Triangle^{[b]}
- The Strange Woman^{[b]}^{[d]}
- The Stranger^{[b]}^{[c]}
- Suspense^{[b]}^{[c]}
- Temptation^{[b]}
- They Made Me a Killer^{[a]}^{[d]}
- Three Strangers^{[b]}
- Two Smart People^{[b]}
- Undercurrent^{[b]}^{[c]}
- The Verdict^{[b]}^{[d]}
- Whistle Stop^{[b]}^{[c]}

=== 1947 ===
- The Arnelo Affair^{[b]}
- Backlash^{[b]}^{[d]}
- Blackmail^{[a]}^{[d]}
- Blind Spot^{[b]}^{[d]}
- Body and Soul^{[b]}^{[c]}
- Boomerang!^{[b]}^{[c]}
- Born to Kill^{[b]}^{[c]}
- The Brasher Doubloon^{[b]}^{[c]}
- Brute Force^{[b]}^{[c]}
- Bury Me Dead^{[a]}^{[b]}
- Calcutta^{[b]}^{[c]}
- Crossfire^{[b]}^{[c]}
- Cry Wolf^{[b]}
- Dark Passage^{[b]}^{[c]}
- Dead Reckoning^{[b]}^{[c]}
- Deep Valley^{[b]}
- Desperate^{[b]}^{[c]}
- The Devil Thumbs a Ride^{[d]}
- A Double Life^{[b]}^{[c]}
- Fall Guy^{[b]}^{[c]}
- Fear in the Night^{[b]}^{[c]}
- The Flame^{[b]}
- For You I Die^{[a]}^{[b]}
- Framed^{[b]}^{[c]}
- The Gangster^{[b]}^{[c]}
- The Guilty^{[b]}^{[c]}
- High Tide^{[b]}^{[d]}
- High Wall^{[b]}^{[c]}
- The Invisible Wall^{[a]}
- Ivy^{[b]}^{[d]}
- Johnny O'Clock^{[b]}^{[c]}
- Key Witness^{[a]}^{[b]}
- Kiss of Death^{[b]}^{[c]}
- The Lady from Shanghai^{[b]}^{[c]}
- Lady in the Lake^{[b]}^{[c]}
- The Long Night^{[b]}^{[c]}
- Love from a Stranger^{[b]}
- Lured (a.k.a. Personal Column)^{[b]}
- The Macomber Affair^{[b]}
- The Man I Love^{[b]}^{[c]}
- Moss Rose^{[b]}^{[d]}
- Nightmare Alley — horror noir^{[b]}^{[c]}
- Nora Prentiss^{[b]}^{[c]}
- Out of the Past^{[b]}^{[c]}
- The Paradine Case^{[b]}
- Possessed^{[b]}^{[c]}
- The Pretender^{[b]}^{[c]}
- Railroaded!^{[b]}^{[c]}
- The Red House^{[b]}^{[c]}
- Repeat Performance^{[d]}
- Ride the Pink Horse^{[b]}^{[c]}
- Riffraff^{[a]}
- Second Chance^{[a]}
- Shoot to Kill^{[b]}^{[d]}
- Singapore^{[b]}^{[d]}
- T-Men^{[b]}^{[c]}
- They Won't Believe Me^{[b]}^{[c]}
- The Thirteenth Hour - Whistler series^{[a]}^{[b]}
- The Two Mrs. Carrolls^{[b]}^{[d]}
- The Unfaithful^{[b]}^{[d]}
- The Unsuspected^{[b]}^{[c]}
- Violence^{[a]}
- The Web^{[b]}
- The Woman on the Beach^{[b]}^{[d]}

=== 1948 ===
- All My Sons^{[b]}
- The Argyle Secrets^{[g]}
- Behind Locked Doors^{[b]}^{[c]}
- Berlin Express^{[c]}
- The Big Clock^{[b]}^{[c]}
- Blonde Ice^{[a]}^{[d]}
- Bodyguard^{[b]}^{[d]}
- Call Northside 777^{[b]}^{[c]}
- Canon City^{[b]}^{[c]}
- Cry of the City^{[b]}^{[c]}
- The Dark Past^{[b]}^{[c]}
- Force of Evil^{[b]}^{[c]}
- He Walked by Night^{[b]}^{[c]}
- Hollow Triumph (a.k.a. The Scar)^{[b]}^{[c]}
- The Hunted^{[b]}^{[d]}
- I Love Trouble^{[a]}
- I Walk Alone^{[b]}^{[c]}
- I Wouldn't Be in Your Shoes^{[b]}^{[c]}
- Inner Sanctum^{[a]}^{[d]}
- Key Largo^{[b]}^{[c]}
- Kiss the Blood Off My Hands^{[b]}^{[c]}
- Larceny^{[b]}
- Money Madness^{[a]}
- Moonrise^{[b]}^{[c]}
- The Naked City^{[b]}^{[c]}
- Night Has a Thousand Eyes^{[b]}^{[c]}
- Open Secret^{[a]}
- Parole, Inc.^{[a]}^{[b]}
- Pitfall^{[b]}^{[c]}
- Race Street^{[b]}
- Raw Deal^{[b]}^{[c]}
- The Return of the Whistler - Whistler series^{[a]}^{[b]}
- Road House^{[b]}^{[c]}
- Ruthless^{[b]}
- Secret Beyond the Door^{[b]}^{[c]}
- Shed No Tears^{[a]}^{[b]}
- The Sign of the Ram^{[a]}^{[b]}
- Sleep, My Love^{[b]}^{[c]}
- Sorry, Wrong Number^{[b]}^{[c]}
- The Street with No Name^{[b]}^{[c]}
- They Live by Night^{[b]}^{[c]}
- To the Ends of the Earth^{[b]}
- The Velvet Touch^{[b]}
- Walk a Crooked Mile^{[g]}
- Whiplash^{[b]}
- The Woman in White^{[b]}

=== 1949 ===
- Abandoned (a.k.a. Abandoned Woman)^{[b]}^{[c]}
- The Accused^{[b]}^{[c]}
- Act of Violence^{[b]}^{[c]}
- All the King's Men^{[b]}
- Beyond the Forest^{[b]}^{[c]}
- The Big Steal^{[d]}
- Border Incident^{[b]}^{[c]}
- The Bribe^{[b]}^{[c]}
- C-Man^{[a]}^{[b]}
- Caught^{[b]}^{[c]}
- Champion^{[b]}^{[d]}
- Chicago Deadline^{[b]}^{[c]}
- City Across the River^{[b]}
- The Clay Pigeon^{[b]}^{[c]}
- Cover Up^{[b]}^{[c]}
- Criss Cross^{[b]}^{[c]}
- The Crooked Way^{[b]}^{[c]}
- A Dangerous Profession^{[b]}
- Flamingo Road^{[b]}
- Flaxy Martin^{[b]}
- Follow Me Quietly^{[b]}^{[c]}
- House of Strangers^{[b]}^{[c]}
- Illegal Entry^{[b]}
- Impact^{[b]}^{[c]}
- Incident^{[a]}^{[b]}
- Jigsaw^{[b]}
- Johnny Allegro^{[g]}
- Johnny Stool Pigeon^{[b]}^{[c]}
- Knock on Any Door^{[b]}^{[c]}
- Manhandled^{[b]}^{[c]}
- Port of New York^{[b]}^{[d]}
- The Reckless Moment^{[b]}^{[c]}
- Red Light^{[b]}^{[c]}
- The Red Menace^{[a]}
- Rope of Sand^{[b]}
- Scene of the Crime^{[b]}^{[c]}
- The Set-Up^{[b]}^{[c]}
- Shockproof^{[b]}^{[c]}
- The Story of Molly X^{[g]}
- Strange Bargain^{[b]}
- Take One False Step^{[b]}
- Tension^{[b]}^{[d]}
- Thieves' Highway^{[b]}^{[c]}
- The Threat^{[b]}^{[c]}
- Too Late for Tears (a.k.a. Killer Bait)^{[b]}^{[c]}
- Trapped^{[b]}^{[d]}
- The Undercover Man^{[b]}^{[c]}
- Undertow^{[b]}^{[d]}
- Whirlpool^{[b]}^{[c]}
- White Heat^{[b]}^{[c]}
- The Window^{[b]}^{[c]}
- Without Honor^{[a]}^{[b]}
- The Woman on Pier 13 (a.k.a. I Married a Communist)^{[b]}^{[c]}
- A Woman's Secret^{[b]}

=== 1950 ===
- 711 Ocean Drive^{[b]}^{[c]}
- Armored Car Robbery^{[b]}^{[c]}
- The Asphalt Jungle^{[b]}^{[c]}
- Backfire^{[b]}^{[d]}
- Between Midnight and Dawn^{[b]}^{[c]}
- Black Hand^{[b]}
- Born to Be Bad^{[b]}
- The Breaking Point^{[b]}^{[c]}
- Caged^{[b]}^{[c]}
- The Capture^{[b]}
- Convicted^{[b]}^{[c]}
- Crisis^{[b]}^{[c]}
- The Damned Don't Cry!^{[b]}^{[c]}
- Dark City^{[b]}^{[c]}
- Destination Murder^{[b]}^{[c]}
- Dial 1119^{[b]}
- D.O.A.^{[b]}^{[c]}
- Edge of Doom^{[b]}^{[c]}
- The File on Thelma Jordon^{[b]}^{[c]}
- Guilty Bystander^{[b]}^{[c]}
- Gun Crazy^{[b]}^{[c]}
- Highway 301^{[b]}
- House by the River^{[b]}^{[d]}
- Hunt the Man Down^{[b]}
- In a Lonely Place^{[b]}^{[c]}
- The Killer That Stalked New York (a.k.a. Frightened City)^{[b]}^{[c]}
- Kiss Tomorrow Goodbye^{[b]}^{[c]}
- A Lady Without Passport^{[b]}^{[c]}
- The Lawless^{[b]}
- The Man Who Cheated Himself^{[b]}^{[c]}
- Mystery Street^{[b]}^{[c]}
- Night and the City^{[b]}^{[c]}
- No Man of Her Own^{[b]}^{[c]}
- No Way Out^{[b]}
- Once a Thief^{[b]}
- One Way Street^{[b]}^{[d]}
- Outside the Wall^{[b]}
- Panic in the Streets^{[b]}^{[c]}
- Quicksand^{[b]}^{[c]}
- The Second Woman^{[b]}^{[d]}
- The Secret Fury^{[b]}^{[c]}
- Shadow on the Wall^{[b]}
- Shakedown^{[b]}^{[c]}
- Side Street^{[b]}^{[c]}
- The Sleeping City^{[b]}^{[c]}
- The Sound of Fury (a.k.a. Try and Get Me)^{[b]}^{[c]}
- Southside 1-1000^{[b]}^{[c]}
- Sunset Boulevard^{[b]}^{[c]}
- The Tattooed Stranger^{[b]}^{[c]}
- This Side of the Law^{[a]}^{[b]}
- The Underworld Story^{[b]}^{[d]}
- Union Station^{[b]}^{[c]}
- Unmasked^{[a]}
- Walk Softly, Stranger^{[b]}^{[c]}
- Where Danger Lives^{[b]}^{[c]}
- Where the Sidewalk Ends^{[b]}^{[c]}
- Woman in Hiding^{[b]}^{[d]}
- Woman on the Run^{[b]}^{[c]}

=== 1951 ===
- The 13th Letter^{[b]}^{[c]}
- Ace in the Hole (a.k.a. The Big Carnival)^{[b]}^{[c]}
- Appointment with Danger^{[b]}^{[c]}
- The Big Night^{[b]}^{[c]}
- Cause for Alarm!^{[b]}^{[c]}
- Cry Danger^{[b]}^{[c]}
- Detective Story^{[b]}^{[c]}
- The Enforcer (a.k.a. Murder, Inc.)^{[b]}^{[c]}
- FBI Girl^{[g]}
- Fourteen Hours^{[b]}
- Gambling House^{[b]}^{[d]}
- The Girl on the Bridge^{[a]}
- He Ran All the Way^{[b]}^{[c]}
- His Kind of Woman^{[b]}^{[c]}
- Hollywood Story^{[b]}^{[c]}
- The Hoodlum^{[b]}^{[d]}
- The House on Telegraph Hill^{[b]}^{[c]}
- I Was a Communist for the FBI^{[b]}^{[c]}
- Inside the Walls of Folsom Prison^{[m]}
- Iron Man^{[b]}
- Lightning Strikes Twice^{[b]}
- M^{[b]}^{[c]}
- The Man with My Face^{[b]}^{[c]}
- The Mob^{[b]}^{[c]}
- No Questions Asked^{[b]}^{[c]}
- The People Against O'Hara^{[b]}^{[c]}
- Pickup^{[a]}^{[c]}
- A Place in the Sun^{[b]}^{[c]}
- The Prowler^{[b]}^{[c]}
- The Racket^{[b]}^{[c]}
- The Raging Tide^{[b]}^{[c]}
- Roadblock^{[b]}^{[c]}
- The Scarf^{[b]}^{[c]}
- Sirocco^{[b]}
- Storm Warning^{[b]}
- Strangers on a Train^{[b]}^{[c]}
- The Strip^{[b]}^{[c]}
- The Sun Sets at Dawn^{[a]}^{[b]}
- Three Steps North^{[b]}
- Tokyo File 212
- Tomorrow Is Another Day^{[b]}^{[c]}
- Two of a Kind^{[a]}^{[b]}
- Under the Gun^{[b]}^{[c]}
- The Unknown Man^{[b]}^{[c]}
- The Well^{[b]}
- The Whip Hand^{[a]}

=== 1952 ===
- Affair in Trinidad^{[b]}^{[c]}
- Beware, My Lovely^{[b]}^{[c]}
- The Captive City^{[b]}^{[c]}
- Clash by Night^{[b]}^{[c]}
- Deadline – U.S.A.^{[g]}
- Don't Bother to Knock^{[b]}
- The Green Glove^{[b]}
- Hoodlum Empire^{[b]}^{[d]}
- Kansas City Confidential^{[b]}^{[c]}
- The Las Vegas Story^{[c]}
- Loan Shark^{[b]}^{[c]}
- Macao^{[b]}^{[c]}
- The Narrow Margin^{[b]}^{[c]}
- Night Without Sleep^{[b]}^{[c]}
- On Dangerous Ground^{[b]}^{[c]}
- Scandal Sheet^{[b]}^{[c]}
- The Sellout^{[b]}
- The Sniper^{[b]}^{[c]}
- The Steel Trap^{[b]}
- Strange Fascination^{[b]}^{[c]}
- Sudden Fear^{[b]}^{[c]}
- Talk About a Stranger^{[b]}^{[c]}
- The Thief^{[b]}^{[c]}
- This Woman Is Dangerous^{[b]}
- The Turning Point^{[b]}^{[c]}
- Walk East on Beacon^{[g]}
- Without Warning^{[b]}^{[c]}

=== 1953 ===
- 99 River Street^{[b]}^{[c]}
- Angel Face^{[b]}^{[c]}
- The Big Heat^{[b]}^{[c]}
- The Bigamist ^{[d]}
- The Blue Gardenia^{[b]}^{[c]}
- A Blueprint for Murder^{[b]}^{[c]}
- City That Never Sleeps^{[b]}^{[c]}
- Count the Hours^{[g]}
- Cry of the Hunted^{[c]}
- Dangerous Crossing^{[b]}
- Forbidden^{[b]}
- The Glass Wall^{[b]}
- The Glass Web (3-D)^{[b]}
- The Hitch-Hiker^{[b]}^{[c]}
- I Confess^{[b]}^{[d]}
- I, the Jury (3-D)^{[b]}^{[c]}
- Jennifer^{[b]}
- Jeopardy^{[b]}^{[c]}
- Man in the Attic^{[b]}^{[d]}
- Man in the Dark (3-D)^{[b]}^{[d]}
- No Escape (a.k.a. City on a Hunt)^{[a]}^{[b]}
- Pickup on South Street^{[b]}^{[c]}
- Split Second^{[a]}^{[d]}
- The System^{[b]}
- Vicki^{[b]}^{[c]}
- Wicked Woman^{[b]}^{[d]}

=== 1954 ===
- Bait^{[a]}
- Black Tuesday^{[b]}^{[c]}
- Crime Wave^{[b]}^{[c]}
- Cry Vengeance^{[b]}^{[c]}
- Down Three Dark Streets
- Drive a Crooked Road^{[b]}^{[c]}
- Hell's Half Acre^{[b]}^{[c]}
- Highway Dragnet^{[b]}^{[d]}
- Human Desire^{[b]}^{[c]}
- The Human Jungle^{[b]}
- Jail Bait^{[a]}
- A Life at Stake ^{[g]}
- The Long Wait^{[b]}^{[c]}
- Loophole^{[b]}^{[c]}
- Make Haste to Live^{[b]}^{[c]}
- The Miami Story^{[g]}
- Naked Alibi^{[b]}^{[c]}
- The Other Woman^{[b]}^{[c]}
- Playgirl^{[b]}
- Private Hell 36^{[b]}^{[c]}
- Pushover^{[b]}^{[c]}
- Riot in Cell Block 11^{[b]}^{[d]}
- Rogue Cop^{[b]}^{[c]}
- Shield for Murder^{[b]}^{[c]}
- Suddenly^{[b]}^{[c]}
- Twist of Fate^{[b]}
- Witness to Murder^{[b]}^{[c]}
- World for Ransom^{[b]}^{[c]}

=== 1955 ===
- 5 Against the House^{[g]}
- Betrayed Women^{[m]}
- The Big Bluff^{[b]}
- The Big Combo^{[b]}^{[c]}
- Big House, U.S.A.^{[m]}
- The Big Knife^{[b]}^{[c]}
- A Bullet for Joey^{[g]}
- Chicago Syndicate^{[g]}
- Crashout^{[b]}
- The Crooked Web^{[b]}
- The Desperate Hours^{[b]}^{[d]}
- Female Jungle^{[a]}^{[c]}
- Female on the Beach^{[b]}
- Finger Man^{[a]}
- Illegal^{[b]}^{[d]}
- Killer's Kiss^{[b]}^{[c]}
- Kiss Me Deadly^{[b]}^{[c]}
- Las Vegas Shakedown^{[g]}
- Murder Is My Beat^{[b]}^{[c]}
- The Naked Street^{[b]}
- New Orleans Uncensored^{[g]}
- New York Confidential^{[b]}^{[c]}
- The Night Holds Terror^{[b]}^{[c]}
- The Night of the Hunter^{[d]}
- The Phenix City Story^{[b]}^{[d]}
- Queen Bee^{[b]}
- Shack Out on 101^{[a]}
- Sudden Danger^{[a]}^{[b]}
- Tight Spot^{[b]}
- Women's Prison^{[b]}

=== 1956 ===
- Behind the High Wall^{[a]}
- Beyond a Reasonable Doubt^{[b]}^{[c]}
- The Come On^{[a]}^{[b]}
- Crime Against Joe^{[a]}
- Crime in the Streets^{[a]}
- A Cry in the Night^{[b]}^{[d]}
- Death of a Scoundrel^{[b]}
- The Harder They Fall^{[b]}^{[c]}
- The Houston Story^{[a]}
- Inside Detroit^{[g]}
- Julie^{[b]}
- The Killer Is Loose^{[b]}^{[c]}
- The Killing^{[b]}^{[c]}
- Man in the Vault^{[a]}
- The Man is Armed^{[b]}
- Miami Exposé^{[g]}
- Nightmare^{[b]}^{[c]}
- Over-Exposed^{[g]}
- Please Murder Me^{[b]}^{[d]}
- The Price of Fear^{[a]}^{[b]}
- The Scarlet Hour
- The Steel Jungle^{[b]}
- Storm Fear^{[b]}^{[c]}
- Terror at Midnight^{[b]}
- Time Table^{[b]}^{[d]}
- While the City Sleeps^{[b]}^{[c]}
- The Wrong Man^{[b]}^{[c]}

=== 1957 ===
- Affair in Havana^{[b]}^{[c]}
- Baby Face Nelson^{[c]}
- The Brothers Rico^{[c]}
- The Burglar^{[b]}^{[c]}
- Chicago Confidential^{[a]}
- Crime of Passion^{[b]}^{[c]}
- Escape from San Quentin^{[j]}
- Four Boys and a Gun^{[a]}
- The Garment Jungle^{[b]}^{[c]}
- Hell Bound^{[a]}
- Hidden Fear^{[g]}
- Hit and Run^{[a]}^{[c]}
- House of Numbers^{[c]}
- The Midnight Story^{[g]}
- My Gun Is Quick^{[a]}
- The Night Runner^{[b]}^{[c]}
- Nightfall^{[b]}^{[c]}
- Plunder Road^{[b]}^{[c]}
- Portland Exposé^{[g]}
- The Shadow on the Window^{[b]}
- Short Cut to Hell^{[b]}^{[d]}
- Slaughter on Tenth Avenue^{[g]}
- Sweet Smell of Success^{[b]}^{[c]}
- The Tattered Dress^{[c]}
- The Tijuana Story^{[j]}
- Teenage Doll^{[a]}

=== 1958 ===
- Appointment with a Shadow^{[b]}
- The Case Against Brooklyn
- Cry Terror!^{[b]}
- I Want to Live!^{[b]}
- The Lineup^{[b]}^{[c]}
- Lonelyhearts^{[b]}
- Murder by Contract^{[b]}^{[d]}
- Revolt in the Big House^{[a]}
- Screaming Mimi^{[b]}^{[d]}
- Step Down to Terror^{[b]}
- Thunder Road^{[g]}
- Touch of Evil^{[b]}^{[c]}

=== 1959 ===
- The Beat Generation^{[c]}
- City of Fear^{[b]}^{[d]}
- The Crimson Kimono^{[b]}^{[c]}
- Cry Tough^{[b]}
- The Last Mile^{[b]}
- The Man in the Net^{[b]}
- Odds Against Tomorrow^{[b]}^{[c]}

== American color noir ==
- Leave Her to Heaven (1945)^{[b]}^{[c]}
- Desert Fury (1947)
- Rope (1948)^{[b]}
- Inferno (1953, 3-D)
- Niagara (1953)^{[b]}^{[c]}
- Second Chance (1953, 3-D)^{[d]}
- Black Widow (1954)^{[g]}
- Hell on Frisco Bay (1955)^{[g]}
- Hell's Island (a.k.a. South Sea Fury) (1955)^{[b]}^{[c]}
- House of Bamboo (1955)^{[c]}
- I Died a Thousand Times (1955)^{[b]}^{[c]}
- Violent Saturday (1955)^{[g]}
- Accused of Murder (1956)^{[a]}
- A Kiss Before Dying (1956)^{[b]}^{[c]}
- Slightly Scarlet (1956)^{[b]}^{[c]}
- The Unguarded Moment (1956)^{[b]}^{[c]}
- A Woman's Devotion (a.k.a. Battle Shock) (1956)^{[a]}
- Istanbul (1957)^{[b]}^{[c]}
- The Unholy Wife (1957)^{[a]}
- Party Girl (1958)^{[c]}
- Vertigo (1958)^{[b]}^{[c]}
- The Trap (1959)^{[b]}^{[c]}

== British noir ==
=== 1942 ===
- The Night Has Eyes (a.k.a. Terror House)^{[e]}^{[f]}

=== 1945 ===
- Dead of Night^{[f]}
- Great Day^{[f]}
- Murder in Reverse^{[f]}
- Pink String and Sealing Wax^{[e]}^{[f]}
- The Seventh Veil^{[h]}
- Waterloo Road^{[f]}

=== 1946 ===
- Appointment with Crime^{[g]}
- Wanted for Murder^{[f]}

=== 1947 ===
- Brighton Rock (a.k.a. Young Scarface)^{[e]}^{[f]}
- The Brothers^{[h]}
- Dancing with Crime^{[f]}
- Dear Murderer^{[f]}^{[h]}
- Frieda^{[f]}
- It Always Rains on Sunday^{[e]}^{[f]}
- Mine Own Executioner^{[f]}^{[h]}
- Night Beat^{[f]}
- The October Man^{[e]}^{[f]}
- Odd Man Out^{[e]}^{[f]}
- Take My Life^{[h]}
- Temptation Harbour^{[f]}
- They Made Me a Fugitive (a.k.a. I Became a Criminal)^{[e]}^{[f]}
- The Upturned Glass^{[f]}

=== 1948 ===
- Blanche Fury^{[f]}
- Daybreak^{[f]}
- Escape^{[a]}^{[b]}
- The Fallen Idol^{[e]}^{[f]}
- Good-Time Girl^{[f]}
- No Orchids for Miss Blandish (a.k.a. Black Dice)^{[f]}^{[h]}
- Noose (a.k.a. The Silk Noose)^{[f]}
- The Small Voice (a.k.a. The Hideout)^{[f]}
- So Evil My Love^{[b]}^{[d]}
- Uneasy Terms^{[f]}

=== 1949 ===
- Boys in Brown^{[f]}
- Conspirator
- Forbidden (a.k.a. Scarlet Heaven)^{[f]}
- The Interrupted Journey^{[h]}
- Obsession (a.k.a. The Hidden Room)^{[b]}^{[f]}
- Silent Dust^{[f]}
- The Small Back Room^{[f]}
- The Spider and the Fly^{[h]}
- The Third Man^{[e]}^{[f]}

=== 1950 ===
- The Blue Lamp^{[f]}
- Cage of Gold^{[g]}
- The Clouded Yellow^{[g]}
- So Long at the Fair (a.k.a. The Black Curse)^{[g]}
- The Woman in Question (a.k.a. Five Angles on Murder)^{[g]}

=== 1951 ===
- Another Man's Poison^{[b]}
- Cloudburst^{[g]}
- I'll Get You for This (a.k.a. Lucky Nick Cain)^{[g]}
- The Long Dark Hall^{[g]}
- Pool of London^{[f]}
- There Is Another Sun (a.k.a. Wall of Death)^{[f]}

=== 1952 ===
- The Gambler and the Lady^{[a]}
- The Last Page (a.k.a. Man Bait)^{[a]}
- The Lost Hours (a.k.a. The Big Frame)^{[a]}
- Stolen Face^{[e]}
- Wide Boy^{[f]}
- Wings of Danger (a.k.a. Dead on Course)^{[g]}
- Women of Twilight (a.k.a. Twilight Women)^{[g]}

=== 1953 ===
- 36 Hours (a.k.a. Terror Street)^{[a]}^{[d]}
- Black 13^{[f]}
- Cosh Boy (a.k.a. The Slasher)^{[h]}
- Deadly Nightshade^{[g]}
- The Flanagan Boy (a.k.a. Bad Blonde)^{[a]}^{[f]}
- The Intruder^{[f]}
- The Limping Man^{[g]}
- The Long Memory^{[f]}
- The Man Between^{[f]}
- Mantrap (a.k.a. Man in Hiding)^{[g]}
- Marilyn (a.k.a. Roadhouse Girl)^{[a]}^{[f]}
- Street of Shadows (a.k.a. Shadow Man)^{[g]}
- Three Steps to the Gallows (a.k.a. White Fire)^{[g]}
- Time Bomb (a.k.a. Terror on a Train)^{[g]}

=== 1954 ===
- Beautiful Stranger (a.k.a. Twist of Fate)^{[g]}
- Before I Wake (a.k.a. Shadow of Fear)^{[b]}
- Face the Music (a.k.a. The Black Glove)^{[g]}
- Five Days (a.k.a. Paid to Kill)^{[a]}
- The Good Die Young^{[f]}^{[h]}
- The House Across the Lake (a.k.a. Heat Wave)^{[a]}^{[f]}
- Impulse^{[a]}^{[f]}
- Murder by Proxy (a.k.a. Blackout)^{[a]}
- The Sleeping Tiger^{[b]}
- A Stranger Came Home (a.k.a. The Unholy Four)^{[f]}
- Third Party Risk (a.k.a. Deadly Game)^{[g]}
- The Weak and the Wicked (a.k.a. Young and Willing)^{[f]}

=== 1955 ===
- The Brain Machine^{[f]}
- Cast a Dark Shadow^{[a]}
- Confession (a.k.a. The Deadliest Sin)^{[a]}^{[f]}
- Dial 999 (a.k.a. The Way Out)^{[a]}
- Joe MacBeth^{[f]}
- Little Red Monkey (a.k.a. Case of the Red Monkey)^{[g]}
- The Ship That Died of Shame (a.k.a. PT Raiders)^{[f]}

=== 1956 ===
- The Intimate Stranger (a.k.a. Finger of Guilt)^{[g]}
- Soho Incident (a.k.a. Spin a Dark Web)^{[a]}
- Tiger in the Smoke^{[f]}
- Wicked As They Come (a.k.a. Portrait in Smoke)^{[a]}
- Yield to the Night (a.k.a. Blonde Sinner)^{[f]}

=== 1957 ===
- Across the Bridge^{[g]}
- The Big Chance
- The Counterfeit Plan^{[g]}
- Fortune Is a Woman (a.k.a. She Played With Fire)^{[g]}
- Hell Drivers^{[e]}^{[f]}
- Kill Her Gently^{[a]}
- Kill Me Tomorrow^{[g]}
- The Long Haul^{[f]}
- Man in the Shadow (a.k.a. Violent Stranger)^{[g]}
- Time Without Pity^{[a]}^{[e]}

=== 1958 ===
- Chase a Crooked Shadow^{[g]}
- Nowhere to Go^{[a]}
- Tread Softly Stranger^{[g]}

=== 1959 ===
- Blind Date (a.k.a. Chance Meeting)^{[e]}

== International noir ==
- Le Corbeau (The Raven) (1943, France)^{[e]}
- Distinto amanecer (Another Dawn) (1943, Mexico)^{[g]}
- Ossessione (Obsession) (1943, Italy)^{[e]}
- La Mujer sin Alma (Woman without a Soul) (1944, Mexico)^{[g]}
- La Otra (The Other One) (1945, Mexico)
- Crepúsculo (Twilight) (1945, Mexico)
- La devoradora (The Man Eater) (1946, Mexico)^{[g]}
- Macadam (Back Streets of Paris) (1946, France)^{[n]}
- Die Mörder sind unter uns (Murderers Among Us) (1946, Germany)^{[e]}
- Les Portes de la nuit (Gates of the Night) (1946, France)^{[g]}
- Panique (Panic) (1946, France)^{[g]}
- A Sangre Fría (In Cold Blood) (1947, Argentina)^{[l]}
- La diosa arrodillada (The Kneeling Goddess) (1947, Mexico)
- Quai des Orfèvres (Jenny Lamour) (1947, France)^{[e]}^{[f]}
- Whispering City (1947, Canada)^{[b]}^{[d]}
- Los verdes paraísos (The Green Paradises) (1947, Argentina)
- Dédée d'Anvers (Woman of Antwerp) (1948, France)^{[g]}
- Drunken Angel (1948, Japan)^{[e]}
- Pasaporte a Río (Passport to Rio) (1948, Argentina)^{[g]}^{[l]}
- La muerte camina en la lluvia (Death Walks in the Rain) (1948, Argentina)
- Los pulpos (The Octopuses) (1948, Argentina)
- Stray Dog (1949, Japan)^{[e]}
- Une si jolie petite plage (Riptide) (1949, France)^{[g]}
- Apenas un delincuente (Hardly a Criminal) (1949, Argentina)^{[l]}^{[m]}
- De hombre a hombre (Man to Man) (1949, Argentina)
- La danza del fuego (The Dance of Fire) (1949, Argentina)
- Yo no elegí mi vida (I Did Not Choose My Life) (1949, Argentina)
- Morir en su ley (To Die on One's Own Terms) (1949, Argentina)
- Aventurera (The Adventuress)(1950, Mexico)^{[e]}
- Gunman in the Streets (1950, France)^{[g]}
- Manèges (The Cheat) (1950, France)^{[g]}
- Los Olvidados (The Young and the Damned) (1950, Mexico)^{[e]}
- La muerte está mintiendo (Death Is Lying) (1950, Argentina)
- Der Verlorene (The Lost One) (1951, West Germany)^{[e]}
- El Pendiente (The Earring) (1951, Argentina)^{[g]}^{[l]}
- En La Palma de Tu Mano (In the Palm of Your Hand) (1951, Mexico)
- Sangre negra (Native Son) (1951, Argentina)
- Víctimas del Pecado (Victims of Sin)(1951, Mexico)^{[g]}
- El extraño caso del hombre y la bestia (The Strange Case of the Man and the Beast) (1951, Argentina)
- Casque d'or (Golden Helmet) (1952, France)^{[n]}
- La noche avanza (The Night Falls) (1952, Mexico)
- Imbarco a mezzanotte (Stranger on the Prowl) (1952, Italy)^{[b]}
- La bestia debe morir (The Beast Must Die) (1952, Argentina)^{[l]}^{[m]}
- No abras nunca esa puerta (Don't Ever Open That Door) (1952, Argentina)^{[l]}^{[m]}
- Si muero antes de despertar (If I Should Die Before I Wake ) (1952, Argentina)^{[g]}^{[l]}
- Deshonra (Dishonor) (1952, Argentina)
- Abenteuer in Wien (Adventure in Vienna) (1953, Austria)^{[k]}
- El vampiro negro (The Black Vampire) (1953, Argentina)^{[l]}^{[m]}
- La môme vert-de-gris (Poison Ivy) (1953, France)^{[g]}
- Stolen Identity (1953, Austria)
- Thérèse Raquin (The Adultress) (1953, France)^{[g]}
- Razzia sur la chnouf (Razzia) (1954, France)^{[g]}
- Touchez pas au grisbi (Grisbi) (1954, France)^{[e]}^{[f]}
- La bestia humana (The Human Beast) (1954, Argentina)
- Caídos en el infierno (Fallen into Hell) (1954, Argentina)
- Bob le flambeur (Bob the Gambler) (1955, France)^{[e]}
- Les Diaboliques (Diabolique) (1955, France) - horror noir ^{[f]}
- Mr. Arkadin (a.k.a. Confidential Report) (1955, France, Spain, Switzerland)^{[b]}^{[c]}
- Angela (1955, Italy)^{[g]}
- Du rififi chez les hommes (Rififi) (1955, France)^{[e]}^{[f]}
- Los Tallos Amargos (The Bitter Stems) (1956, Argentina)^{[l]}^{[m]}
- Voici le temps des assassins (Deadlier Than the Male) (1956, France)^{[g]}
- Sección desaparecidos (Missing Persons Section) (1956, Argentina)
- Nachts, wenn der Teufel kam (The Devil Strikes at Night) (1957, West Germany)^{[e]}
- Retour de manivelle (There's Always a Price Tag) (1957, France)^{[g]}
- Le rouge est mis (Speaking of Murder) (1957, France)^{[g]}
- Ascenseur pour l'échafaud (Elevator to the Gallows) (1958, France)^{[e]}
- Le désordre et la nuit (Night Affair) (1958, France)^{[g]}
- Le Dos au mur (Back to the Wall a.k.a. Evidence in Concrete) (1958, France)^{[n]}
- Rosaura a las diez (Rosaura at 10 O'Clock) (1958, Argentina)^{[g]}^{[l]}
- Deux hommes dans Manhattan (Two Men in Manhattan) (1959, France)^{[g]}

== Classic-period crossover films ==
=== Noir Westerns ===
- The Ox-Bow Incident (1943)^{[c]}
- Duel in the Sun (1946, color)^{[d]}
- My Darling Clementine (1946)^{[c]}
- Pursued (1947)^{[b]}^{[c]}
- Ramrod (1947)^{[d]}
- Blood on the Moon (1948)^{[b]}^{[c]}
- Colorado Territory (1948)
- Coroner Creek (1948, color)
- The Man from Colorado (1948, color)^{[h]}
- Station West (1948)^{[c]}
- Whispering Smith (1948, color)^{[c]}
- I Shot Jesse James (1949)^{[d]}
- Lust for Gold (1949)^{[b]}
- Rimfire (1949)^{[g]}
- Roughshod (1949)^{[g]}
- The Walking Hills (1949)^{[g]}
- Yellow Sky (1949)^{[c]}
- Devil's Doorway (1950)^{[b]}^{[c]}
- The Furies (1950)^{[b]}
- The Gunfighter (1950)^{[b]}
- Winchester '73 (1950)^{[c]}
- Rawhide (1951)^{[c]}
- The Secret of Convict Lake (1951)^{[g]}
- High Noon (1952)^{[e]}
- The Outcasts of Poker Flat (1952)^{[b]}
- Rancho Notorious (1952, color)^{[b]}
- The Naked Spur (1953, color)^{[c]}
- Johnny Guitar (1954, color)^{[c]}
- Silver Lode (1954, color)^{[e]}
- Track of the Cat (1954, color)^{[c]}
- Bad Day at Black Rock (1955, color)^{[g]}
- The Man from Laramie (1955, color)^{[c]}
- Man with the Gun (1955)
- Rebel in Town (1956)
- 3:10 to Yuma (1957)
- Black Patch (1957)
- Forty Guns (1957)
- The Halliday Brand (1957)^{[b]}
- The Tall T (1957, color)
- Valerie (1957)^{[b]}
- The Badlanders (1958, color)^{[g]}
- Man of the West (1958, color)^{[c]}
- Terror in a Texas Town (1958)

=== Miscellaneous crossover films ===
- Stranger on the Third Floor (1940) — horror noir ^{[b]}^{[c]}
- The Body Snatcher (1945) — horror noir^{[c]}
- Confidential Agent (1945) — espionage thriller noir^{[b]}
- The Picture of Dorian Gray (1945) — Horror-fantasy noir^{[b]}^{[c]}
- The Beast with Five Fingers (1946) — horror noir^{[b]}
- Bedlam (1946) — horror noir^{[c]}
- The Brute Man (1946) — horror noir
- Cloak and Dagger (1946) — espionage thriller noir^{[b]}
- Nightmare Alley (1946) — horror noir^{[b]}^{[c]}
- Shock (1946) — horror noir ^{[b]}^{[c]}
- 13 Rue Madeleine (1947) — World War II noir^{[g]}
- The Amazing Mr. X (a.k.a. The Spiritualist) (1948) — horror noir ^{[a]}
- The Treasure of the Sierra Madre (1948) — adventure noir^{[b]}
- Alias Nick Beal (a.k.a. The Contact Man) (1949) — fantasy noir and horror noir^{[b]}
- Black Magic (1949) — 18th-century period piece noir^{[b]}
- Reign of Terror (a.k.a. The Black Book) (1949) — French Revolution noir^{[b]}^{[c]}
- The Steel Helmet (1951) — Korean War noir^{[b]}
- The Tall Target (1951) — American Civil War noir^{[b]}^{[c]}
- Dementia (a.k.a. Daughter of Horror) (1953) — horror noir
- Carmen Jones (1954, color) — musical noir^{[e]}
- Attack! (1956) — World War II noir^{[b]}
- The Bad Seed (1956) — horror-thriller noir^{[b]}
- Invasion of the Body Snatchers (1956) — science fiction noir^{[b]}^{[d]}

=== Noir comedies / parodies ===
- Whistling in the Dark (1941)^{[c]}
- Fly-by-Night (1942)^{[c]}
- Who Killed Who? (1943, color)
- Arsenic and Old Lace (1944)^{[c]}
- Hail the Conquering Hero (1944)^{[c]}
- The Miracle of Morgan's Creek (1944)^{[c]}
- Donald's Crime (1945, color)
- Duck Pimples (1945, color)
- Lady on a Train (1945)^{[b]}^{[c]}
- Murder, He Says (1945)^{[c]}
- Wonder Man (1945)^{[c]}
- The Great Piggy Bank Robbery (1946, color)
- Monsieur Verdoux (1947)^{[b]}^{[c]}
- My Favorite Brunette (1947)^{[c]}
- The Secret Life of Walter Mitty (1947, color)^{[c]}
- Unfaithfully Yours (1948)^{[b]}^{[c]}
- The Lucky Stiff (1949)^{[b]}
- Golden Yeggs (1950, color)
- Red, Hot and Blue (1949)^{[e]}
- Rooty Toot Toot (1951, color)
- The Band Wagon (segment "Girl Hunt Ballet") (1953, color)^{[e]}
- Beat the Devil (1953)^{[b]}

== See also ==
- List of neo-noir titles
- Film gris
- Golden Age of American animation
