= Jan Englund =

American screenwriter (1927–2018)

- Born: August 23, 1927; Bronx, New York, U.S.
- Died: January 16, 2018 (aged 90); Boynton Beach, Florida, U.S.
- Occupation(s): Actress, screenwriter
- Spouse: Mark Lowell

Jan Lowell (née Englund; August 23, 1927 – January 16, 2018) was an American screenwriter and actress known for her work on exploitation films from the 1950s through the 1970s. She often worked alongside her husband, writer-actor Mark Lowell.

After marrying her husband, she began working as an actress for stage and screen. Her first acting roles came in a series of Hugo Haas films in the mid-1950s. Soon, they were writing film scripts for B-movies like High School Hellcats and His and Hers. The pair also spent a significant amount of time living in Rome, where they worked on spaghetti Westerns like A Fistful of Dollars.

== Selected filmography ==
As an actress:

- The "Human" Factor (1975)
- Paradise Alley (1962)
- Suicide Battalion (1958)
- Reform School Girl (1957)
- Invasion of the Saucer Men (1957)
- Lizzie (1957)
- Hit and Run (1957)
- Emergency Hospital (1956)
- Hold Back Tomorrow (1955)
- The Other Woman (1954)
- Bait (1954)

As a writer:

- A Candidate for Killing (1969)
- A Quiet Business (1964)
- A Fistful of Dollars (1964) (uncredited)
- His and Hers (1961)
- Diary of a High School Bride (1959)
- High School Hellcats (1958)
