= Paradise Alley (1958 film) =

1958 film directed by Hugo Haas

- Directed by: Hugo Haas
- Written by: Hugo Haas
- Produced by: Hugo Haas
- Starring: Hugo Haas; Carol Morris; Marie Windsor
- Music by: Franz Steininger
- Production company: Sutton Pictures
- Distributed by: Pathé-America Distributing Co. Astor Pictures
- Release date: March 4, 1958
- Running time: 81 minutes
- Country: United States
- Language: English

Paradise Alley is a 1958 comedy-drama, written, directed, produced by, and starring Hugo Haas. Supporting players included Carol Morris and Marie Windsor. The picture premiered in Hollywood on March 4, 1958, but was not theatrically released until May 1962.

Originally titled Stars in the Backyard, Paradise Alley was the final film appearance and directorial effort of Haas before his death in 1968.

== Cast ==
- Hugo Haas as Mr. Agus
- Carol Morris as Susie Wilson (Miss Universe)
- Marie Windsor as Linda Belita
- Corinne Griffith as Mrs. Wilson
- Billy Gilbert as Julius Wilson
- Chester Conklin as Mr. Gregory
- Margaret Hamilton as Mrs. Nicholson
- Pat Goldin as Patrick
- Don Sullivan as Steve Nicholson
- William Forrest as Norman Holmes
- William Schallert as Jack Williams
- Tom Fadden as Mr. Nicholson
- Jan Englund as Miss Stanley
- Jesslyn Fax as Mrs. Holmes
- Clegg Hoyt as Herb
- Almira Sessions as Mrs. Walker
- Anthony Jochim as Mr. Jonas
- Cyril Delevanti as Grandpa
- Tom Duggan — Special Guest
- Irwin Berke — Special Guest
