= One Girl's Confession =

1953 film

- 1953 theatrical poster
- Directed by: Hugo Haas
- Written by: Hugo Haas
- Produced by: Hugo Haas
- Starring: Cleo Moore; Hugo Haas; Glenn Langan; Anthony Jochim; Russ Conway; Gayne Whitman; Martha Wentworth
- Cinematography: Paul Ivano
- Edited by: Merrill G. White
- Music by: Václav Divina
- Production company: Hugo Haas Productions
- Distributed by: Columbia Pictures
- Release date: April 6, 1953 (United States)
- Running time: 74 minutes
- Country: United States
- Language: English

One Girl's Confession is a 1953 low-budget film noir released by Columbia Pictures. The movie stars Cleo Moore and was written, produced, and directed by Hugo Haas who also plays a supporting part in the film.

This film was released on DVD by Sony Pictures in 2010 as part of the Bad Girls of Film Noir Volume II collection along with Night Editor, Women's Prison and Over-Exposed. The tagline for this film was "I'm the kind of girl every man wants ... but shouldn't marry."

The film has been preserved in the UCLA Film & Television Archive, and was screened as part of their 2008 retrospective "Cool Drinks of Water: Columbia's Noir Girls of the '40s and '50s."

== Plot ==
Mary Adams is a waitress in a waterfront bar run by a man who had swindled her father years before. One night, she climbs in the man's bedroom window and steals $25,000 from under his pillow. The police arrive the next morning, and to escape pursuit and the reprisal of the bar-owner, she confesses to the crime. When the money is not recovered, Adams is sent to prison for five years, but earns early release for good behavior. While on parole, she gets another waterfront waitressing job, working for a Dragomie Damitrof. Mary believes that she is being watched by the authorities still trying to recover the money, and is un-trusting of everyone.

Adams meets Johnny, a fisherman, and soon begins to entertain thoughts of helping her new boyfriend with a business loan. Then Damitrof loses the bar in a card game, and she offers to give him the money to forestall the debtors. Adams draws him a map to the location where she buried the loot. When Damitrof realizes this is the same girl that stole money from her employer at the same dock three years ago, he says he won't report her. When he returns from his trip to the cache, Damitrof bitterly reports that he could not find the money and angrily throws her out of his home.

Some days later, the bar appears to be under new ownership. Upon closer inspection, it develops that the bar is simply under new management, but Damitrof has taken a vacation and moved into a fancy new apartment, apparently finding the money after all. Adams confronts him at the apartment and attempts to recover the money. She strikes him on the head when he clutches her in his drunken stupor, and believes him to be dead. The owner's girlfriend tells her she is mistaken about the money, as she witnessed Damitrof win it gambling. She retrieves her money and donates it to an orphanage, then goes to the police to confesses to the murder of Damitrof.

When they call his apartment they discover Damitrof is still alive, she leaves and attempts to recover the money, but is unsuccessful. Adams and Damitrof cross paths at the dock, but he has no memory of her assault on him, and he offers to reemploy her. When Johnny arrives and professes his love for her, Damitrof advises that she deserves something more solid, and they ship off together.

== Cast ==
- Cleo Moore as Mary Adams
- Hugo Haas as Dragomie Damitrof
- Glenn Langan as Johnny
- Anthony Jochim as Father Benedict
- Burt Mustin as Gardener
- Russ Conway as Police Officer
- James Nusser as Warden
- Gayne Whitman as District Attorney
- Martha Wentworth as Old Lady

== Release ==
The film was released theatrically by Columbia Pictures in the United States on April 6, 1953, and European releases included it as Farligt tjuvgods in Sweden and Confessione di una ragazza in Italy.

In October 2000, it had its West German television release as Geständnis eines Mädchens. In 2010, Sony Pictures Home Entertainment included it in volume 2 of their Bad Girls of Film Noir series.
