= Hold Back Tomorrow =

1955 film

- Poster
- Directed by: Hugo Haas
- Written by: Hugo Haas
- Produced by: Hugo Hass
- Starring: Cleo Moore; John Agar
- Cinematography: Paul Ivano
- Edited by: Henry DeMond
- Music by: Sidney Cutner
- Color process: Black and white
- Production company: Hugo Hass Productions
- Distributed by: Universal International
- Release date: November 1955
- Running time: 75 minutes
- Country: United States
- Language: English

Hold Back Tomorrow is a 1955 American film noir drama film directed by Hugo Haas and starring Cleo Moore and John Agar.

== Plot ==
In an unnamed country, Joe Cardos, a double murderer awaiting hanging in an isolation cell the next morning, is allowed by law to have one last request before his execution. He tells the warden that despite his earlier wishes to be left alone, he now wants to spend his final night having fun in the company of a woman and, to provide the music for his party, two musicians. Despite his misgivings, the humane warden is sympathetic to the inmate, who is an angry disturbed man who has refused any contact with his stepsister or the prison padre. After a fruitless search for volunteers at the local brothel, the police find Dora Garben, a destitute and depressed woman who has attempted suicide at the beginning of the film. After some hostile interactions, Dora breaks down Joe's anger and they realise they have much in common. Joe discloses to Dora his dream in which the rope breaks as the trapdoor opens and the death bells ring. Apparently by law, this would mean the hanged man would be freed. The couple become closer and, in spite of their unusual circumstances, fall in love. In the absence of the musicians, Joe asks one of the warders to borrow his American radio, and the couple dance. Just before the time of the hanging, Joe persuades the prison chaplain to marry them. The warden's wife and the man's stepsister attend as witnesses. Joe reconciles with his stepsister at last. He is led down a corridor to the gallows. Dora and the stepsister go into the prison chapel and, as the death bells toll, they pray for Joe's dream miracle to come true.

== Cast ==
- Cleo Moore as Dora Garben
- John Agar as Joe Cardos
- Frank DeKova as Priest
- Dallas Boyd as Warden
- Steffi Sidney as Clara
- Mel Welles as First Guard
- Harry Guardino as Detective
- Mona Knox as Escort Girl
- Arlene Harris as Proprietress
- Kay Riehl as Warden's Wife
- Jan Englund as Girl
- Pat Goldin as Dancing Comedian

== Production ==
The film is inspired by novella Tonka of the Gallows by Egon Erwin Kisch, which was previously adapted into film as Tonka of the Gallows (1936). This was the second film to co-star Moore and Agar, who had appeared together in 1954's Bait, which was also directed by Hugo Haas. Agar was a Universal contract player at the time of this film, and Moore was on loan from Columbia Pictures.

== See also ==
- List of American films of 1955
