= Edge of Hell =

1956 film

- Film poster by Reynold Brown
- Directed by: Hugo Haas
- Written by: Hugo Haas
- Produced by: Hugo Haas
- Starring: Hugo Haas; Francesca De Scaffa; June Shelley; Jeffrey Stone; Ken Carlton; Syra Marty
- Cinematography: Eddie Fitzgerald
- Edited by: Robert S. Eisen
- Music by: Ernest Gold
- Production company: Hugo Haas Productions
- Distributed by: Universal Pictures
- Release date: July 18, 1956
- Running time: 78 minutes
- Country: United States
- Language: English

Edge of Hell is a 1956 American drama film produced, written and directed by Hugo Haas. The film stars Hugo Haas, Francesca De Scaffa, June Shelley, Jeffrey Stone, Ken Carlton and Syra Marty. The film was shot in 1953 under the title Tender Hearts. The film was given a more lurid exploitation title when it was picked up by Universal-International Pictures and released on July 18, 1956.

== Plot ==
Mr. Valentine is an urbane panhandler with a wealth of friends and an amazing best friend, a performing dog named Flip. Things change dramatically for Mr. Valentine when his fellow tenant Helen Baxter's boyfriend, a chauffeur for a millionaire, suggests Valentine and Flip put on a show for the birthday party of the millionaire's spoiled son.

The show entertains all the children and the millionaire and Mr. Valentine become friends. The former rewards the latter with not only money and drinks, but a large leftover dinner and cake with several bottles of spirits. However the son demands to have Flip for himself with Mr. Valentine turning down an offer of $500.

Mr. Valentine throws a party with his gifts for his friends including another tenant, French prostitute Jenette Delatour and her pimp.

After the height of wealth and the esteem of his party guests, Mr. Valentine soon goes to the depths when his health fails. He is no longer able to perform with Flip on the streets, and he is evicted from his basement for continued non payment of his rent. The lack of food and bad weather also get to Flip whose health suffers. Mr. Valentine has to force himself to sell Flip to the millionaire so Flip's health will improve, but as the millionaire is away, his wife will only give Mr. Valentine $50 that he accepts in order to give Flip a good home.

Flip pines for his master and won't eat whilst the pimp, who believes Mr. Valentine has received $500 conspires with a violent criminal to rob Mr. Valentine.

== Cast ==
- Hugo Haas as Mr. Valentine
- Francesca De Scaffa as Jenette Delatour
- June Shelley as Helen Baxter
- Jeffrey Stone as Freddy
- Ken Carlton as Billy
- Syra Marty as Syra
- John Vosper as Charles Hawkins
- Tracey Roberts as Mrs. Hawkins
- Anthony Jochim as Butler
- Pat Goldin as Foxie
- Julie Mitchum as Miss Halsey
- Sid Melton as Schreck
- Burt Mustin as Mr. Morrison
- Steve Mitchell as Bus Driver

== Reception ==
Leonard Maltin awarded the film one and a half stars.
