= Born to Be Loved =

1959 film

- Directed by: Hugo Haas
- Written by: Hugo Haas
- Produced by: Hugo Haas; Robert Erlik
- Starring: Carol Morris; Barbara Jo Allen; Hugo Haas; Dick Kallman
- Cinematography: Maury Gertsman
- Edited by: Stefan Arnsten
- Music by: Hugo Haas; Franz Steininger
- Production company: Hugo Haas Productions
- Distributed by: Universal Pictures
- Release date: June 1959
- Running time: 82 minutes
- Country: United States
- Language: English

Born to Be Loved is a 1959 American comedy film directed by Hugo Haas. Set in an overcrowded tenement building, it stars Carol Morris (as Dorothy); Hugo Haas (Prof. Brauer); Dick Kallman (Eddie); and Barbara Jo Allen (Mrs. Hoffmann).

== Plot ==
A seamstress (Carol Morris) and a music teacher (Hugo Haas) play cupid for each other, ending with a double wedding.

== Cast ==
- Carol Morris as Dorothy Atwater
- Barbara Jo Allen as Irene Hoffman (as Vera Vague)
- Hugo Haas as Prof. Brauner
- Dick Kallman as Eddie Flynn
- Jacqueline Fontaine as Dame
- Billie Bird as Drunk's Wife
- Pat Goldin as Saxophone Player
- Robert Foulk as Drunk (as Robert C. Foulk)
- Maryesther Denver as Hallway Woman
- Margot Baker as Suzie's Mother
- Anthony Jochim as Fred (as Tony Jochim)

== See also ==
- List of American films of 1959
