= Thy Neighbor's Wife (1953 film) =

1953 film by Hugo Haas

- Theatrical release poster
- Directed by: Hugo Haas
- Written by: Hugo Haas
- Based on: The Peasant Judge by Oskar Jellinek
- Produced by: Hugo Haas
- Starring: Cleo Moore; Hugo Haas; Ken Carlton; Kathleen Hughes; Anthony Jochim; Tom Fadden
- Cinematography: Paul Ivano
- Edited by: Albert Shaff; Merrill G. White
- Music by: Václav Divina
- Production company: Hugo Haas Productions
- Distributed by: 20th Century Fox
- Release date: September 11, 1953
- Running time: 77 minutes
- Country: United States
- Language: English

Thy Neighbor's Wife is a 1953 American drama film written, produced and directed by Hugo Haas and starring Cleo Moore, Hugo Haas, Ken Carlton, Kathleen Hughes, Anthony Jochim and Tom Fadden. It was released on September 11, 1953, by 20th Century Fox.

== Cast ==
- Cleo Moore as Lita Vojnar
- Hugo Haas as Town Judge Raphael Vojnar
- Ken Carlton as Quirin Michael
- Kathleen Hughes as Anushka
- Anthony Jochim as Sima
- Tom Fadden as Honza Kratky
- Darr Smith
- Oscar O'Shea
- Tom Wilson
- Roy Engel
- Robert Knapp
- Joe Duval
- Henry Corden

== Release ==
The film opened in 4 theatres in Los Angeles on September 11, 1953, on a double bill with City of Bad Men grossing $17,000 in its first week.
