= Hunt the Man Down =

1950 film by George Archainbaud

- Theatrical release poster
- Directed by: George Archainbaud
- Written by: DeVallon Scott
- Produced by: Lewis J. Rachmil
- Starring: Gig Young; Carla Balenda; James Anderson; Cleo Moore; Mary Anderson
- Cinematography: Nicholas Musuraca, A.S.C.
- Edited by: Samuel E. Beetley
- Music by: Paul Sawtell
- Production company: RKO Pictures
- Distributed by: RKO Pictures
- Release date: December 26, 1950
- Running time: 69 minutes
- Country: United States
- Language: English

Hunt the Man Down is a 1950 American crime film directed by George Archainbaud and starring Gig Young.

== Plot ==
When loner Bill Jackson prevents a robbery at the bar where he works, the ensuing media attention reveals that he is actually Richard Kinkaid, a fugitive wanted in connection with a 12-year-old murder case. Public defender Paul Bennett believes that Kinkaid is innocent but lacks fresh evidence to solidify his case. With an innocent man's freedom in the balance, Bennett must find and interview the crime's original seven witnesses.

== Cast ==
- Gig Young as Paul Bennett
- Lynne Roberts as Sally Clark
- Mary Anderson as Alice McGuire / Peggy Linden
- Willard Parker as Burnell 'Brick' Appleby
- Carla Balenda as Rolene Wood
- Gerald Mohr as Walter Long
- James Anderson as Richard Kincaid / William H. Jackson
- John Kellogg as Kerry "Lefty" McGuire
- Harry Shannon as Wallace Bennett
- Cleo Moore as Pat Sheldon
- Christy Palmer as Mrs. Joan Brian
- Iris Adrian as Marie (uncredited)
- Vince Barnett as Joe (uncredited)
- Al Bridge as Ulysses Grant Sheldon (uncredited)
- Frank Cady as Show Box Puppeteer (uncredited)
- Dick Elliott as Happy (uncredited)
- William Forrest as J.P. Knight (uncredited)
- Paul Frees as Packard 'Packy' Collins (uncredited)
- William Haade as Bart (uncredited)
- Al Hill as Pete Floogle (uncredited)
- James Seay as Prosecutor (uncredited)

== Reception ==
In a contemporary review, critic Edwin Schallert of the Los Angeles Times wrote: "[I]ts interest and suspense are dramatically sustained. A less trite ending would have made it a better production. The quest for witnesses for a crime 12 years old has many novel facets, and holds the attention, because it is well carried out."
