= Al Hill (actor) =

American actor (1892–1954)

- Born: July 14, 1892
- Died: July 14, 1954 (aged 62)
- Occupation: Actor
- Years active: 1927–1954

Alexander E. Hill Marks (July 14, 1892 – July 14, 1954), with the stage name Al Hill, was an American film character actor. He appeared in more than 320 films between 1927 and 1954, including the 1951 film The Girl on the Bridge. He was born in Manhattan, and lived for a time in England. In 1918 he married the wealthy British film actor Renee Boucicault, daughter of popular Broadway and West End actor Aubrey Boucicault and granddaughter of Irish actor and dramatist Dion Boucicault, and they divorced a year later. Hill became embroiled in a law suit when his ex-wife claimed he profited from her. Hill also briefly acted as Howard Boucicault, a name he took at Renee Boucicault's urging.

Hill died in 1954 on his 62nd birthday.

== Partial filmography ==
- Me, Gangster (1928)
- Stool Pigeon (1928)
- Alibi (1929)
- The Racketeer (1929)
- Little Caesar (1931) (uncredited)
- Ten Cents a Dance (1931)
- Corsair (1931)
- A Fool's Advice (1932)
- The Last Mile (1932)
- Night After Night (1932)
- The Death Kiss (1932)
- She Done Him Wrong (1933) (uncredited)
- Picture Brides (1933)
- Punch Drunks (1934)
- Against the Law (1934)
- The Personality Kid (1934)
- Name the Woman (1934)
- Men of the Night (1934)
- Buried Loot (1935)
- The Payoff (1935)
- Riffraff (1936)
- The Border Patrolman (1936)
- Motor Madness (1937)
- Kid Galahad (1937) (uncredited)
- The Big Shot (1937)
- San Quentin (1937) as Convict
- Stage Door (1937) (uncredited)
- Boys Town (1938) (uncredited)
- Angels with Dirty Faces (1938) (uncredited)
- The Roaring Twenties (1939) as Ex-Con (uncredited)
- The Bank Dick (1940)
- Lucky Jordan (1942)
- Tramp, Tramp, Tramp (1942)
- Random Harvest (1942) (uncredited)
- A Man's World (1942)
- Knock on Any Door (1949) (uncredited)
- The Girl on the Bridge (1951)
- Run for the Hills (1953)
- A Star Is Born (1954) (uncredited)
