= Apache Ambush =

1955 film by Fred F. Sears

- Film poster
- Directed by: Fred F. Sears
- Screenplay by: David Lang
- Story by: David Lang
- Produced by: Wallace MacDonald
- Starring: Bill Williams; Richard Jaeckel; Alex Montoya
- Cinematography: Fred Jackman, Jr.
- Edited by: Jerome Thoms
- Color process: Black and white
- Production company: Columbia Pictures
- Distributed by: Columbia Pictures
- Release date: August 24, 1955
- Running time: 68 minutes
- Country: United States
- Language: English

Apache Ambush is a 1955 American action Western film set in the period after the end of the American Civil War. It was directed by Fred F. Sears, with a cast that includes Bill Williams, Richard Jaeckel, Alex Montoya, Tex Ritter, and Movita, Marlon Brando's second wife.

== Plot ==
The Civil War now over, President Lincoln, just hours before his assassination, selects Indian scout James Kingston to facilitate a cattle shipment north from Texas to alleviate the shortage of meat in the American northeast. He is helped by cattle driver Tim O'Roarke and former Confederate Major, Donald "Tex" McGuire. But Mexican bandit Joaquin Jironza, working with the Apaches, wants the Henry Repeating Rifles that Hank Calvin, a merchant, is secretly shipping with Kingston's convoy. Lee Parker, an embittered one-armed ex-rebel, is traveling with the convoy and is also an obstacle to Kingston's mission of driving the cattle herd north to Abilene, Kansas through Confederate and Apache territory. A female spy working for Jironza has befriended Calvin, has discovered the repeaters and leaves the wagon train to inform Jironza. Now, Jironza, who has intercepted a messenger to request an army wagon train escort, attacks the wagon train with his Apache allies. Calvin and Lee Parker, panicking as the wagon train is attacked and is being over-powered by Jironza, start using the repeating rifles to repulse the attack. Calvin is killed during the attack; the attack is repulsed, but the secret of the repeating rifles' existence has been revealed.

The wagon train limps into San Arturo but the rifles go missing. Parker is naturally suspected due to his Confederate sympathies but denies the theft. Now, things go from bad to worse. The Union Army is unable to provide Kingston with the promised cattle drive escort, because the Secretary of War has ordered him to leave San Arturo and secure the Mexican border, despite Kingston having written orders from assassinated President Lincoln to do so. The army leaves San Arturo and animosity between Union and Confederate sympathizers turns violent.

The repeating rifles' whereabouts becomes the pressing issue. Kingston discovers Parker knows the rifles' location, and a fight ensues between the Southern and Union sympathizers. Parker, protected by his father, leaves town, and the townsfolk and Kingston's men unite to search for the rifles. In the meantime, Parker is captured by Jironza and offers to reveal the rifles' location in exchange for protecting his father and sister, Ann, and for disrupting the cattle drive north. In town, Kingston by chance, discovers the rifles buried under Calvin's wagon. Now, Jironza and his men attack the town with Parker and the information that he has provided. In the melee, Jironza mortally wounds Parker and kills his father. Before Parker dies, he asks Ann to inform Kingston that the Apache intend to ambush the cattle herd at Carney Pass. The Apache indeed stampede the cattle, and a battle ensues. Kingston, arriving from San Arturo, successfully turns the herd on the attacking Apache, the Apache chief is killed, and the remaining Indians withdraw in disarray. Kingston and his men can now continue the drive to Abilene as planned, and Kingston promises Ann to return.

== Cast ==
- Bill Williams as James Kingston
- Richard Jaeckel as Lee Parker
- Alex Montoya as Joaquin Jironza
- Movita as Rosita
- Adelle August as Ann Parker
- Tex Ritter as Traegar
- Ray Corrigan as Hank Calvin (as Ray 'Crash' Corrigan)
- Ray Teal – Sergeant Tim O'Roarke
- Don Harvey as Donald Tex McGuire (as Don G. Harvey)
- James Griffith as President Abraham Lincoln
- James Flavin as Colonel Marshall
- George Chandler as Chandler
- Forrest Lewis as Sheriff Silas Parker
- George Keymas as Tweedy
- Chris Alcaide as Lt. Shaffin (uncredited)

== See also ==
- List of American films of 1955
