= Adelle August =

American actress (1934–2005)

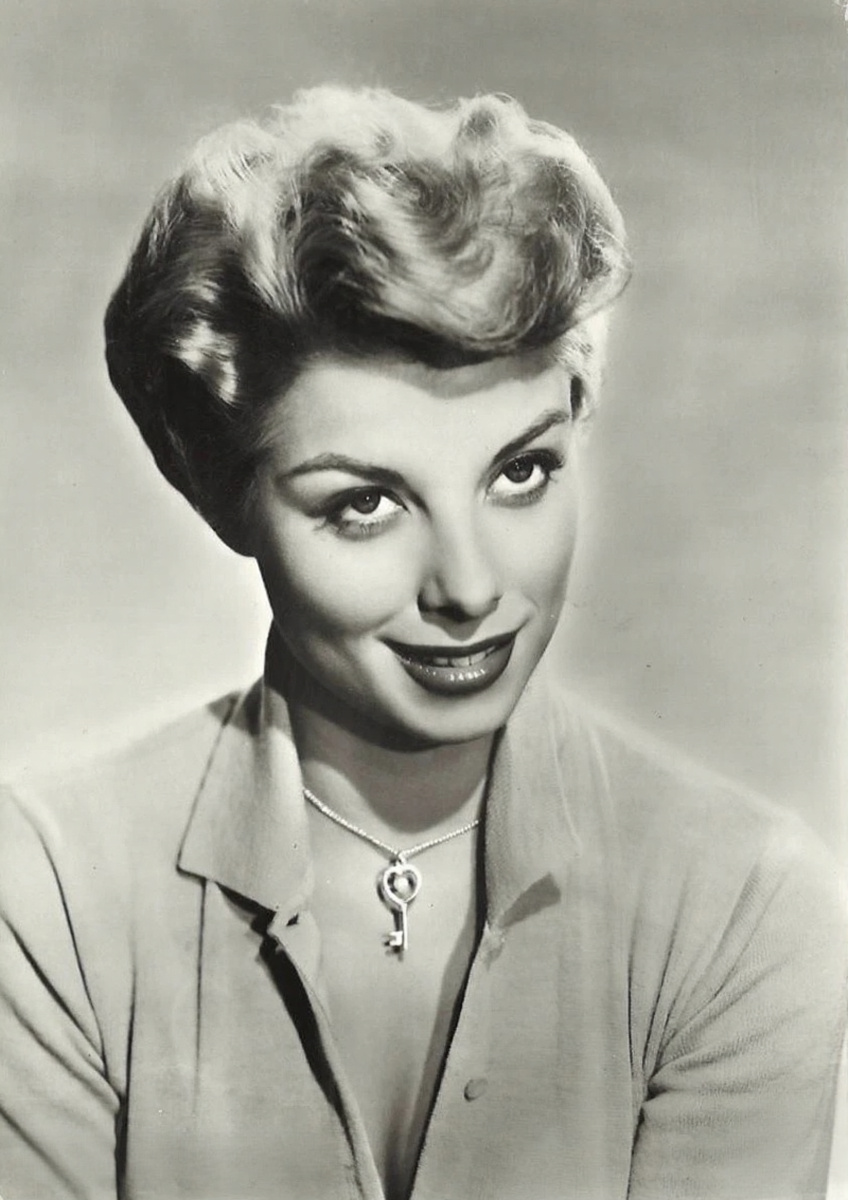
- August in the 1950s
- Born: Adele M. Slaybough; February 12, 1934; Kennewick, Washington, U.S.
- Died: April 24, 2005 (aged 71)
- Other names: Adelle M. Rogers, Adele August
- Occupations: Film, television actress
- Known for: 1952 Miss Washington USA

Adelle August (12 February 1934 – 24 April 2005), was an American movie actress.

She was born in Kennewick, Washington as Adele M. Slaybough. In 1952 she graduated from Highline High School, and was crowned Miss Washington USA the same year. Two years later she was signed to Columbia Pictures. Her brief career in the film industry lasted 1955–56 when she appeared in three films and a pair of television episodes, including the TV western Cheyenne in which she appeared as Jeremy Barnes in the 1955 episode "Julesburg." In addition to her acting career, she was a showgirl at the Tropicana Hotel in Las Vegas, Nevada. She was married to Leonard Rogers in 1959, becoming Adelle M. Rogers.

== Filmography ==
- 1955 My Sister Eileen- Secretary (Uncredited)
- 1955 Apache Ambush - Ann Parker
- 1955 Women's Prison- Grace
- 1956 The Best Things in Life Are Free- Chorus Girl (Uncredited)
- 1956 Hollywood or Bust- Dancer (Uncredited).
