= Mona Knox =

American actress (1929–2008)

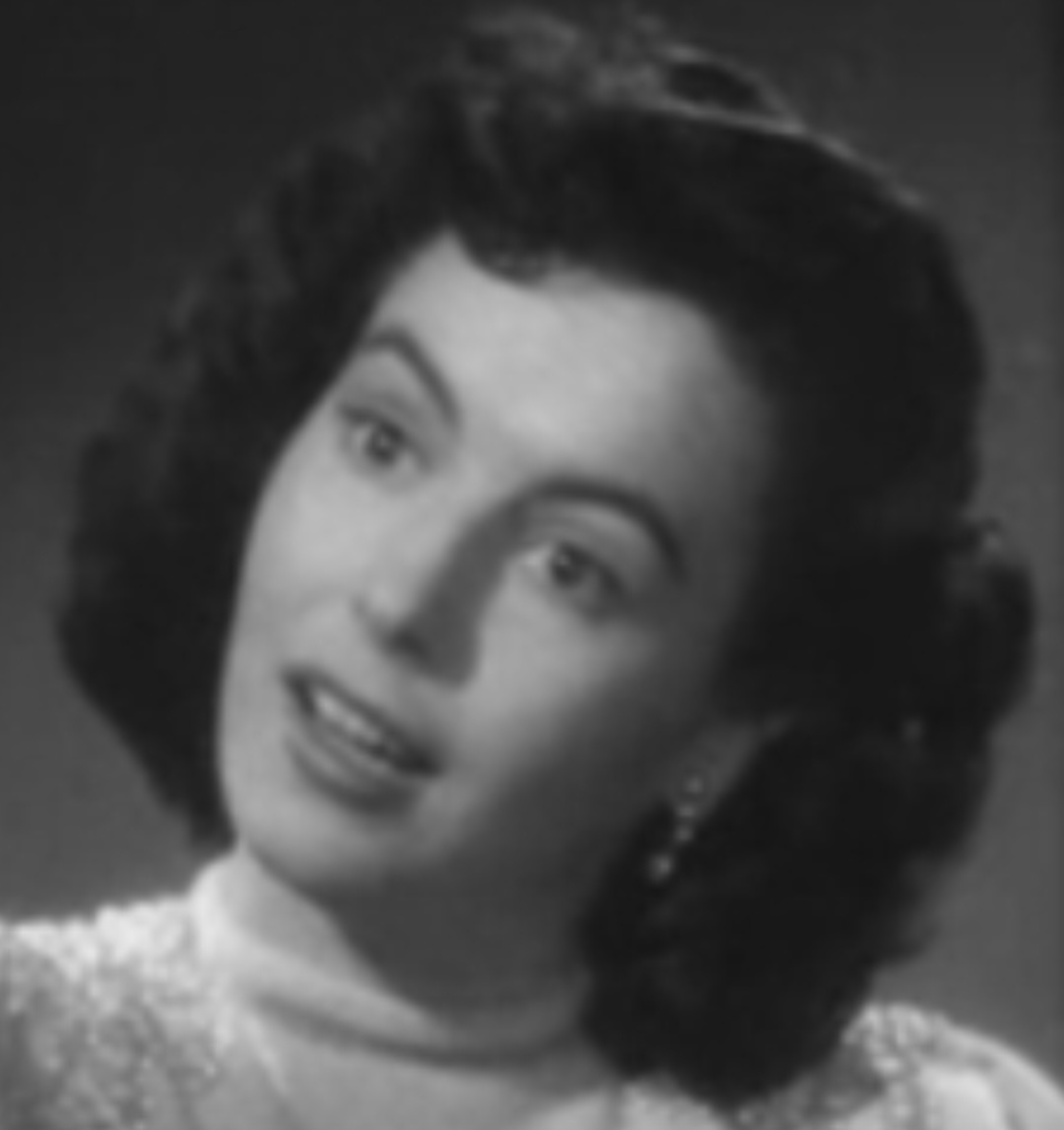
- Knox in Kid Monk Baroni (1952)
- Born: Mona O. Knox; May 1, 1929
- Died: June 11, 2008 (aged 79)
- Occupations: Actress; model
- Years active: 1950–1968
- Spouse: Leslie Spicer (m. 1960; div. 1961)
- Children: 1

Mona O. Knox (May 1, 1929 – June 11, 2008) was an American model and film actress.

== Personal life ==
On August 6, 1960, Knox married obstetrician Leslie Spicer in Encino. They had a son and were divorced on December 14, 1961.

== Partial filmography ==
- A Woman of Distinction (1950) - Minor Role (uncredited)
- Tarzan and the Slave Girl (1950) - Slave Girl (uncredited)
- The Petty Girl (1950) - Mazola Petty Girl (uncredited)
- Flying Leathernecks (1951) - Annabelle (uncredited)
- Sunny Side of the Street (1951) - Bathing Girl (uncredited)
- Reunion in Reno (1951) - Ruthie (uncredited)
- Two Tickets to Broadway (1951) - Showgirl (uncredited)
- Footlight Varieties (1951) - Brunette on beach (uncredited)
- The Greatest Show on Earth (1952) - Mona (uncredited)
- The Las Vegas Story (1952) - Change Girl (uncredited)
- Aladdin and His Lamp (1952) - Dancing Girl (uncredited)
- Hold That Line (1952) - Katie Wayne
- Kid Monk Baroni (1952) - June Travers
- Thundering Caravans (1952) - Alice Scott
- Army Bound (1952) - Gladys
- Eight Iron Men (1952) - Girl in Daydream (uncredited)
- Jalopy (1953) - Slip's dancing partner
- All Ashore (1953) - Bit Role (uncredited)
- The Girl Next Door (1953) - Smitty (uncredited)
- Escape from Terror (1955) - Kathe Solotkin
- Hold Back Tomorrow (1955) - Escort Girl
- New Comedy Showcase (1960, TV series, Season 1 Episode 5 "Maggie") - Journalist
- Rosemary's Baby (1968) - Mrs. Byron (uncredited) (final film role)

== Bibliography ==
- Bernard A. Drew. Motion Picture Series and Sequels: A Reference Guide. Routledge, 2013.
