= Congo Bill (serial) =

1948 film by Thomas Carr, Spencer Gordon Bennet

- Original poster for Congo Bill
- Directed by: Spencer Gordon Bennet; Thomas Carr
- Written by: George H. Plympton; Arthur Hoerl; Lewis Clay
- Based on: Congorilla by: Whitney Ellsworth; George Papp
- Starring: Don McGuire; Cleo Moore; Jack Ingram; I. Stanford Jolley; Leonard Penn; Nelson Leigh
- Distributed by: Columbia Pictures
- Release date: October 28, 1948
- Running time: 15 chapters
- Country: United States
- Language: English

Congo Bill is a Columbia movie serial released in 1948 based on the DC Comics character Congo Bill, later named Congorilla.

== Plot ==
A girl is about to inherit a fortune, but she is missing in Africa. Her family engages Congo Bill, an adventurer, to find her and bring her back to civilization. He follows a legend about a mysterious White Queen, but his path is full of difficulties, through an inhospitable jungle, and the man who will lose his fortune if the girl is found alive.

== Cast ==
- Don McGuire as Congo Bill, famed hunter and animal trainer
- Cleo Moore as Queen Lureen / Ruth Culver, white ruler of a forbidden valley in Africa and the missing heiress to the Culver fortune
- Jack Ingram as Cameron, mysterious trader
- I. Stanford Jolley as Bernie McGraw, villainous trustee of the Culver fortune
- Leonard Penn as Andre Bocar, owner of the seedy African bar The Green Parrot Inn, in Bernie McGraw's pay and working for his own ends
- Nelson Leigh as Dr Greenway
- Charles King as Kleeg, employee of Andre Bocar in The Green Parrot Inn
- Armida Vendrell as Zalea
- Hugh Prosser as Morelli
- Neyle Morrow as Kahla
- Fred Graham as Villabo
- Rusty Wescoatt as Ivan
- Anthony Warde as Rogan
- Stephen Carr as Tom McGraw, the murdered brother of Bernie McGraw and trustee of the Culver fortune
- William Fawcett as Blinky
- Knox Manning as Narrator
- Frank O'Connor as Frank, cafe clerk
- Eddie Parker as torturer
- Stanley Price as Nagu's friend

== Crew ==
- Directors: Thomas Carr, Spencer Gordon Bennet
- Producer: Sam Katzman
- Cinematographer: Ira Morgan
- Art director: Paul Palmentola
- Editors: Earl Turner, Dwight Caldwell
- Sound mixer: Josh Westmoreland

== Chapter titles ==
1. The Untamed Beast
2. Jungle Gold
3. A Hot Reception
4. Congo Bill Springs a Trap
5. White Shadows in the Jungle
6. The White Queen
7. Black Panther
8. Sinister Schemes
9. The Witch Doctor Strikes
10. Trail of Treachery
11. A Desperate Chance
12. The Lair of the Beast
13. Menace of the Jungle
14. Treasure Trap
15. The Missing Letter

_{Source:}

== See also ==
- List of film serials by year
- List of film serials by studio

Preceded by Superman (1948)	Columbia Serial; Congo Bill (1948)	Succeeded by Bruce Gentry (1949)
