= His and Hers (film) =

1961 British film by Brian Desmond Hurst

- Directed by: Brian Desmond Hurst
- Written by: Jan Englund; Robert Lowell (as Mark Lowell); Stanley Mann
- Produced by: Hal E. Chester
- Starring: Terry-Thomas; Janette Scott; Wilfrid Hyde-White; Nicole Maurey
- Cinematography: Ted Scaife
- Edited by: Max Benedict
- Music by: John Addison
- Production company: Sabre Film Production
- Distributed by: Eros Films
- Release dates: 24 January 1961 (London, England)
- Running time: 90 minutes
- Country: United Kingdom
- Language: English

His and Hers is a 1961 British comedy film directed by Brian Desmond Hurst and starring Terry-Thomas, Janette Scott and Wilfrid Hyde-White. It was written by Jan Englund, Robert Lowell (as Mark Lowell) and Stanley Mann.

The film follows an eccentric author who tries to impose his lifestyle on his reluctant wife.

== Plot ==
While researching his latest novel I Conquered the Desert in North Africa, Reggie Blake finds himself lost in the desert. Rescued by a Bedouin tribe, and finally shipped home, Reggie enthusiastically adopts Bedouin dress and customs, much to the frustration of his wife, Fran. She declares herself unable to live with him, so they split their home down the middle. There is further drama when Reggie's publisher rejects his new novel out of hand.

== Cast ==
- Terry-Thomas as Reggie Blake
- Janette Scott as Fran Blake
- Wilfrid Hyde-White as Charles Dunton
- Nicole Maurey as Simone Rolfe
- Joan Sims as Hortense
- Kenneth Connor as Harold
- Meier Tzelniker as Felix McGregor
- Joan Hickson as Phoebe
- Oliver Reed as poet
- Francesca Annis as Wanda
- Dorinda Stevens as Dora
- Kenneth Williams as policeman
- Barbara Hicks as woman
- Billy Lambert as baby
- Colin Gordon as television announcer
- Marie Devereux as wife

== Critical reception ==
The Monthly Film Bulletin wrote: "Written as a satire on the sharp practices behind best-sellers, this film might have had both comedy and point. In its present form, it merely shows how ingrown and futile comedy can become when it takes its material, for the nth time, from other comedy instead of from life. It may well be that there is humour in people getting drunk, in men mismanaging the home, in Englishmen dressed as Bedouins, and in dry old sticks being seduced by plump young Frenchwomen (all elements which pad this thin farce), but if so it requires more originality than this to sustain an audience's laughter. The behaviour of literary folk (both hearty and arty) in the film suggests that the scriptwriter's acquaintance with any branch of literature is slight. One grows tired of saying that British film comedy is in the doldrums; and of wondering how long actors who have made the grade as comedians in their own right will continue to do themselves the disservice of appearing in it."

Kine Weekly wrote: "The picture sets out to debunk the best-seller novelist and the publicity racket, but every now and again gets bogged down in conventional domestic "rough house" and finally falls back on a stagy drunk scene and a Chelsea beatnik party for laughs. Terry-Thomas gives a restless and exciteable portrayal as eggie, Janette Scott seldom misses a trick as Fran, Wilfrid Hyde White and Nicole Maure never let up as Charles and Simone, and Kenneth Connor, Joan Sims and Kenneth Williams make a few bricks without straw as guest artistes, but a little of Billy Lambert as the Blakes' offspring goes a long, long way. Yet resourceful as the adult players are the untidy blue-print prevents them from keeping the fun at concert pitch. The comedy's obvious feminine angle is its sheet anchor."

The Radio Times Guide to Films gave the film 1/5 stars, writing: "Probably the main amusement for viewers of this comedy will be in spotting the familiar faces in the cast, not least Oliver Reed as a poet and Kenneth Williams as an unlikely policeman. The under-nourished screenplay has Terry-Thomas as a writer who transforms from silly ass to recognisable human being when forced to confront reality during a research trip on Bedouins in the desert."

Leslie Halliwell said: "The thinnest of comedy ideas becomes a film of almost no substance at all."
