= Thundering Caravans =

1952 film by Harry Keller

- Directed by: Harry Keller
- Written by: M. Coates Webster
- Produced by: Rudy Ralston
- Starring: Allan Lane; Mona Knox; Eddy Waller
- Cinematography: John MacBurnie
- Edited by: Harold Minter
- Music by: Stanley Wilson
- Production company: Republic Pictures
- Distributed by: Republic Pictures
- Release date: June 20, 1952
- Running time: 54 minutes
- Country: United States
- Language: English

Thundering Caravans is a 1952 American Western film directed by Harry Keller and starring Allan Lane, Mona Knox and Eddy Waller.

The film's art direction was by Frank Hotaling.

== Cast ==
- Allan Lane as Marshal Rocky Lane
- Black Jack as Black Jack
- Eddy Waller as Sheriff Nugget Clark
- Mona Knox as Alice Scott
- Roy Barcroft as Ed Brill
- Isabel Randolph as Deborah Cranston
- Richard Crane as Deputy Dan Reed
- William Henry as Bert Cranston
- Edward Clark as Printer Tom
- Pierre Watkin as Head Marshal
- Stanley Andrews as Henry Scott
- Boyd 'Red' Morgan as Henchman Joe
- Fred Aldrich as Townsman
- Art Dillard as Henchman
- Roy Engel as Frank
- Marshall Reed as Wounded Driver
- Tex Terry as Rogers
- Dale Van Sickel as Cave Henchman

== Bibliography ==
- Bernard A. Drew. Motion Picture Series and Sequels: A Reference Guide. Routledge, 2013.
