= The White Disease =

1937 play written by Karel Čapek

The White Plague (Czech: Bílá nemoc) is a play written by Czech writer Karel Čapek in 1937. Written at a time of increasing threat from Nazi Germany to Czechoslovakia, it portrays a human response to a tense, prewar situation in an unnamed country that greatly resembles Germany with one extra addition: an uncurable white disease, a form of leprosy, is selectively killing off people older than 45. It was adapted as the film Skeleton on Horseback by Hugo Haas.

== Plot ==
A disease known as morbus chengi or the "White Disease" is spreading throughout the world. The disease has symptoms similar to leprosy and strangely only affects those older than forty-five, typically killing its victims within 3-5 months. The pandemic has sent a panic across the country, especially among the older generations; however, the government, led by a dictator known simply as the Marshal, is more focused on using the pandemic as an opportunity for war than finding a cure.

Doctor Galén (a reference to the Roman doctor Galen) has discovered a cure for the disease. However, he refuses to reveal his cure until world peace is declared. Until then, he vows only to cure the poor, as he believes that only the rich have the power to realize his wishes. The government, meanwhile, eager to maintain public order and tranquility, is sponsoring a ruse, allegedly a former student of Galén, who sells fake cures to the rich. These consist largely of removing cosmetic symptoms.

The war begins with the army invading a neighboring small nation, a thinly veiled reference to Czechoslovakia. Other European nations, including England, declare war in response to aggression. Suddenly, the Marshal falls ill himself and will soon die. He realizes that without his personal military genius the country will inevitably lose the war because he was always reticent about promoting capable commanders. His family asks for Galén's help, and the Marshal reluctantly accepts his terms for peace. Galén attempts to reach the Marshal, but is killed at a pro-war youth rally after refusing to join in with their pro-war chant. The aftermath is left ambiguous, and it is uncertain if Europe will be plagued by both the war and the disease, as Galen's formula is destroyed in the struggle.

== Reception ==
The first Czech performance of The White Plague was lauded by the Czech critics Jindřich Vodák, Josef Träger and Václav Černý; on the other hand, the right-wing politician Jiří Stříbrný, as well as the fascist Slovak Hlinka party, strongly criticised the play (the latter group described it as "harmful"). Max Brod predicted the play would be successful abroad, while Thomas Mann sent Čapek a letter praising The White Disease. Čapek was later awarded the state prize for drama for the play. The Czech production of The White Disease in 1937 was given approving coverage by the British pacifist magazine Peace News. The Hebrew version staged by Habima premiered in Tel Aviv on 28 September 1938, one day before the Munich Agreement which led to Germany's annexation of the Sudeten territory.

== Translations ==
The play was first translated into English by Paul Selver and Ralph Neale in 1938; Capek biographer Ivan Klíma calls the Selver/Neale translation "a seriously flawed adaptation". Michael Henry Heim translated the play in 1988 for Crosscurrents: A Yearbook of Central European Culture. Peter Majer and Cathy Porter translated The White Disease for Methuen Drama in 1999.

== See also ==
- List of plays with anti-war themes
