= Ghost Diver =

1957 American adventure film by Richard Einfeld and Merrill G. White

- Theatrical release poster
- Directed by: Richard Einfeld; Merrill G. White
- Screenplay by: Richard Einfeld; Merrill G. White
- Produced by: Richard Einfeld
- Starring: James Craig; Audrey Totter; Nico Minardos; Lowell Brown; Rodolfo Hoyos Jr. Pira Louis
- Cinematography: John M. Nickolaus, Jr.
- Edited by: Merrill G. White
- Music by: Paul Sawtell; Bert Shefter
- Production company: Regal Films Inc
- Distributed by: 20th Century Fox
- Release date: October 1957
- Running time: 76 minutes
- Country: United States
- Language: English

Ghost Diver is a 1957 American adventure film written and directed by Richard Einfeld and Merrill G. White, who usually worked as editors. The film stars James Craig, Audrey Totter, Nico Minardos, Lowell Brown, Rodolfo Hoyos Jr. and Pira Louis. The film was released in October 1957, by 20th Century Fox.

== Plot ==
When a diver discovers an ancient idol in the sea below some South American cliffs, dive captain Manco Capao cuts his air line and kills him and takes the idol. He sells it to Richard Bristol, host of a television show. Richard, his son Bob, and his secretary Anne fly to South America and begin to explore the island where it was found. They meet the dead man's daughter, Pelu Rico, who shows Anne ruins of a "Paracan temple".

Richard and Bob discover an underwater cave below the ruins and decide to restore the idol to its location in the belief that it will point them to even more treasure. Manco attacks Richard while doing so, but Bob rescues him. Manco escapes, and sure enough the idol points him to more treasure. Manco attempts to kill Bob, but escapes again. Pelu and Bob go night-diving to find the treasure cave. Manco, crazed with a lust for gold, attacks Bob underwater. An earthquake strikes, and the collapsing cliffs kill Manco and seal the treasure cave forever. Bob escapes to the surface and his new-found love, Pelu.

== Cast ==
- James Craig as Roger Bristol
- Audrey Totter as Anne Stevens
- Nico Minardos as Manco Capao
- Lowell Brown as Robin Bristol
- Rodolfo Hoyos Jr. as Papa Rico
- Pira Louis as Pelu Rico

== Production ==
Filming started August 13, 1957. One of the female leads was Pira Louis, a Syrian swim champion.
