= Cleo Moore =

American actress (1924–1973)

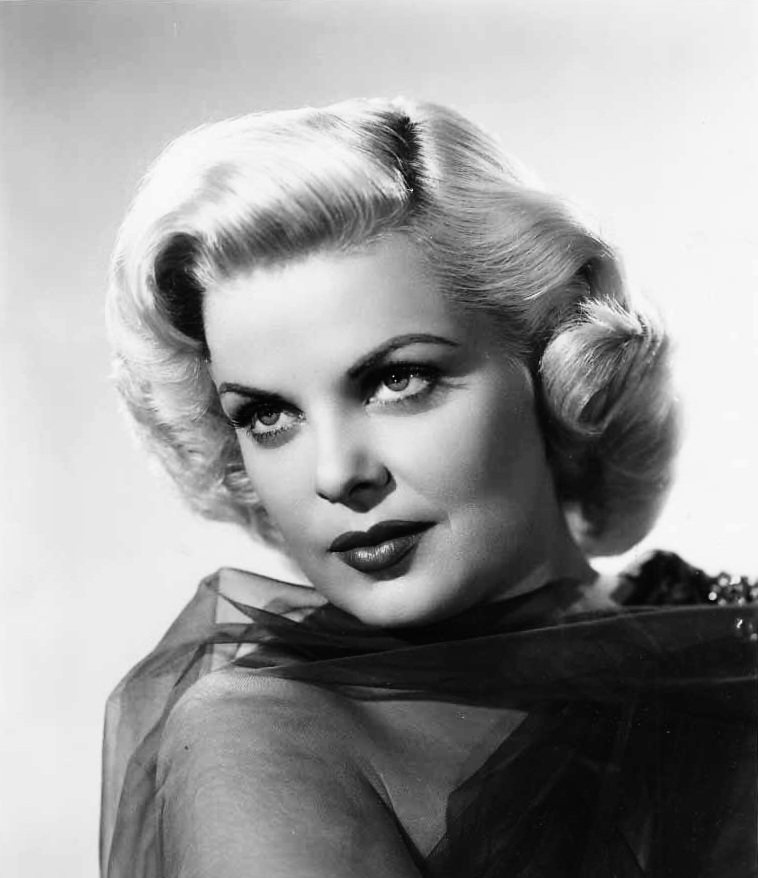
- Moore at the peak of her career, c. 1953
- Born: Cleouna Moore; October 31, 1924; Galvez, Louisiana, U.S.
- Died: October 25, 1973 (aged 48); Inglewood, California, U.S.
- Resting place: Inglewood Park Cemetery
- Occupation: Actress
- Years active: 1948–1957
- Spouses: Palmer Long (m. 1944; div. 1944) Herbert Heftler (m. 1961)

Cleo Una Moore (Note: Many published sources state that her first name was Cleouna, but this seems to be a mangling of her first and middle names, as the 1940 census lists her name as Cleo U. Moore and her mother's first name was Una.) (October 31, 1924 – October 25, 1973) was an American actress, usually featured in the role of a blonde bombshell in Hollywood films of the 1950s, including seven films with Hugo Haas. She also became a well-known pin-up girl.

== Early life ==
Moore was born in in Galvez, Louisiana, and raised in nearby Gonzales. Her father ran a grocery store. She was educated in Gonzales public schools and took a secretarial course at Pope's Commercial College in Baton Rouge.

She married Palmer Long, the youngest child of Huey Long, the former governor of Louisiana who was assassinated while a senator, but the marriage ended in six weeks.

Moore was named Miss Van Nuys for 1947–1948.

== Career ==
Moore made her film debut in 1948 in Embraceable You. She also played the leading lady in the film serial Congo Bill and worked for Warner Bros. briefly in 1950. She worked for RKO Pictures from 1950 to 1952, appearing in films such as Hunt the Man Down and Gambling House.

Moore with baseball player Fred Kipp in 1956

She signed with Columbia Pictures in 1952. The studio had plans to mold Moore as its next film star, hoping that she would bring Columbia the success that Twentieth Century-Fox was enjoying with Marilyn Monroe. In order to compete with Monroe, Moore's hair was bleached platinum blond. Columbia dubbed her "The Next Big Thing" and "The Blonde Rita Hayworth". She first gained attention as a doomed gun moll in Nicholas Ray's film noir On Dangerous Ground in 1952.

Moore began starring in films in 1952. In 1953, she appeared in One Girl's Confession, opposite Hugo Haas, who directed and appeared with her in several other films. She starred in Thy Neighbor's Wife (1953) and Bait (1954), both directed by Haas.

In 1954, she starred in The Other Woman, playing a vengeful B-movie bit player. Upon completing a supporting role in Women's Prison (1955), Moore signed a brief deal with Universal Pictures to play a suicidal prostitute in the low-budget thriller Hold Back Tomorrow (1955), again opposite Agar.

In 1956, Moore starred as a predatory career girl in Over-Exposed, costarring Richard Crenna. The following year, Moore made her final film appearance in Hit and Run (1957). After the release of the film, she retired from acting.

== Personal life ==
After her six-week marriage to Palmer Long, Moore remained single through the 1940s and 1950s. In 1961, Moore married real-estate developer Herbert Heftler.

Moore found success as a businesswoman in real estate after her screen career ended.

== Death ==
Moore died in 1973 from a heart attack at the age of 48. Her remains are buried at Inglewood Park Cemetery.

== Partial filmography ==
- Embraceable You (1948) - Sylvia (uncredited)
- Congo Bill (1948, Serial) - Lureen / Ruth Culver
- Dynamite Pass (1950) - Lulu
- Bright Leaf (1950) - Louise - Cousn (uncredited)
- 711 Ocean Drive (1950) - Mal's Date (uncredited)
- The Great Jewel Robber (1950) - Vivacious Blonde at Airport (uncredited)
- Rio Grande Patrol (1950) - Peppie
- Hunt the Man Down (1950) - Pat Sheldon
- Gambling House (1950) - Sally
- On Dangerous Ground (1951) - Myrna Bowers
- The Pace That Thrills (1952) - Ruby
- Strange Fascination (1952) - Margo
- One Girl's Confession (1953) - Mary Adams
- Thy Neighbor's Wife (1953) - Lita Vojnar
- Bait (1954) - Peggy
- The Other Woman (1954) - Sherry Steward
- Women's Prison (1955) - Mae
- Hold Back Tomorrow (1955) - Dora
- Over-Exposed (1956) - Lila Crane
- Hit and Run (1957) - Julie Hilmer (final film role)
