= Strange Fascination =

1952 film by Hugo Haas

- Theatrical release poster
- Directed by: Hugo Haas
- Written by: Hugo Haas
- Produced by: Hugo Haas
- Starring: Cleo Moore; Hugo Haas; Mona Barrie
- Cinematography: Paul Ivano
- Edited by: Merrill G. White
- Music by: Václav Divina; Jakob Gimpel
- Production company: Hugo Haas Productions
- Distributed by: Columbia Pictures
- Release date: September 1952 (United States)
- Running time: 80 minutes
- Country: United States
- Language: English

Strange Fascination is a 1952 American film noir directed by Hugo Haas, starring Cleo Moore, himself and Mona Barrie. This was the first of six films pairing Haas and Moore.

== Plot ==
The life of Paul Marvan (Haas), a world-famous concert pianist, is ruined after his marriage to beautiful femme fatale Margo (Moore).

== Cast ==
- Cleo Moore as Margo
- Hugo Haas as Paul Marvan
- Mona Barrie as Diana Fowler
- Rick Vallin as Carlo
- Karen Sharpe as June Fowler
