= The Girl on the Bridge (1951 film) =

1951 film by Hugo Haas

- Theatrical release poster
- Directed by: Hugo Haas
- Screenplay by: Hugo Haas; Arnold Lippschitz (as Arnold Phillips)
- Story by: Hugo Haas; Arnold Lippschitz (as Arnold Phillips)
- Produced by: Hugo Haas
- Starring: Hugo Haas; Beverly Michaels; Robert Dane
- Cinematography: Paul Ivano
- Edited by: Merrill G. White (as Merrill White); Albert Shaff
- Music by: Harold Byrns
- Color process: Black and white
- Production company: Hugo Hass Productions
- Distributed by: Twentieth Century-Fox
- Release date: December 6, 1951 (Los Angeles)
- Running time: 76 minutes
- Country: United States
- Language: English

The Girl on the Bridge is a 1951 American crime film noir cowritten and directed by Hugo Haas and starring Haas, Beverly Michaels and Robert Dane. The film's sets were designed by the art director Vin Taylor.

== Plot ==
David Toman, a middle-aged watchmaker who lost his family in the Holocaust, sees Clara, a beautiful young blonde woman, on a bridge and dissuades her from committing suicide. She is a single mother struggling to care for her baby. He asks her to become his housekeeper and she moves into his house with her baby. David and Clara marry and she becomes pregnant.

Mario, the father of Clara's first baby who deserted her while she was pregnant, returns, intending to ask for money, but changes his mind rather than ruin her chance of a happy life. His underworld associate Harry Olson demands $5,000 so that their musical group can travel to Mexico City and make a career there. David strikes Olson with a heavy candlestick, accidentally killing him. Panicking, David disposes of the body in the sea.

Mario, who had been seen arguing with Olson, is charged with his murder. David is wracked with guilt but will not notify the authorities. Mario is acquitted, seemingly ending David's moral dilemma, but he feels guilty and kills himself. Mario returns to Clara, this time seeking her forgiveness, and offers to marry her and become the father to both of her children.

== Cast ==
- Hugo Haas as David Toman
- Beverly Michaels as Clara Barker
- Robert Dane as Mario Venti
- John Close as Harry Olson (as Johnny Close)
- Anthony Jochim as Jonathan Cooper
- Judy Clark as Blonde Doll
- Darr Smith as Husband
- Maria Bibikov as Young Wife (as Maria Bibikoff)
- Dick Pinner as Prosecutor (as Richard Pinner)
