= Two Smart People =

1946 film

- Theatrical release poster
- Directed by: Jules Dassin
- Screenplay by: Leslie Charteris; Ethel Hill
- Story by: Ralph Wheelwright; Allan Kenward
- Produced by: Ralph Wheelwright
- Starring: Lucille Ball; John Hodiak; Lloyd Nolan
- Cinematography: Karl Freund
- Edited by: Chester W. Schaeffer
- Music by: George Bassman
- Production company: Metro-Goldwyn-Mayer
- Distributed by: Loew's Inc.
- Release date: June 4, 1946
- Running time: 93 minutes
- Country: United States
- Language: English
- Budget: $1 million
- Box office: $1.2 million

Two Smart People is a 1946 American film noir crime drama film directed by Jules Dassin and starring Lucille Ball, John Hodiak, Lloyd Nolan and Hugo Haas. It was produced by Metro-Goldwyn-Mayer. It was one of a number of noirs starring Hodiak.

== Plot ==
Ace Connors is a con man who has half a million dollars in bonds hidden in a cookbook. When he tries to sell a bogus oil investment to Dwight Chadwick at a Beverly Hills hotel, Dwight's attractive friend, Ricki Woodner, intervenes with a scam of her own.

Ace is about to go to prison for his part in the theft of the bonds. He arranges a deal to reduce his sentence by testifying, angering his former partner in crime, Fly Feletti.

A cop, Bob Simms, is assigned to accompany Ace on the train from Los Angeles to New York. The passengers include Ricki, who is falling for Ace and wants to help, and Fly, who wants to keep Ace from making it to New York.

Along the way, Ace and Ricki manage to get off the train in New Orleans to enjoy Mardi Gras together. When they do, Ace leaves the book at a costume shop, confident no one will notice it until he returns for it. During a romantic moment around midnight, Ace reveals to Ricki where he's hidden the bonds. Fly makes his move, but Simms is able to beat him to the draw. Ace fears that con artist Ricki has taken it on the lam with his dough, but she turns up, ready to wait for Ace till he's out of Sing Sing.

== Cast ==
- Lucille Ball as Ricki Woodner
- John Hodiak as Ace Connors
- Lloyd Nolan as Bob Simms
- Hugo Haas as Seïnor Rodriquez, Dept. of Agriculture
- Lenore Ulric as Maria Ynez, Inn of the 4 Winds
- Elisha Cook, Jr. as Fly Feletti
- Lloyd Corrigan as Dwight Chadwick
- Vladimir Sokoloff as Monsieur Jacques Dufour
- David Cota as Jose
- Clarence Muse as Porter
- Erwin Kalser as Franz
- George Calliga as Stewart
- Fred Nurney as Victoire
- Fred Toones as Clarence
- Shelley Winters as Princess

== Box office ==
The film earned $871,000 in the US and Canada and $328,000 elsewhere, causing MGM a loss of $252,000.

== Reception ==
When the film was released the film critic for The New York Times panned it, writing, "Except for a lively and colorful series of Mardi Gras sequences in New Orleans, which are introduced quite late in the picture, Two Smart People is an otherwise dreadfully boring hodgepodge about love and the confidence racket ... John Hodiak and Lucille Ball are the principals and they are painfully defeated by the script at almost every turn. Lloyd Nolan as the patient sleuth fares a little better, however. But in addition to its pedestrian plot, Two Smart People also suffers from lack of competent direction."

== Bibliography ==
- Spicer, Andrew. Historical Dictionary of Film Noir. Scarecrow Press, 2010.
