= Merrill G. White =

American film editor (1901–1959)

- Born: December 13, 1901; California, United States
- Died: March 21, 1959 (aged 57); California, United States
- Occupations: Editor, writer
- Years active: 1927–1959 (film)

Merrill G. White (December 13, 1901 – March 21, 1959) was an American film editor and screenwriter. He also co-directed the 1957 film Ghost Diver and was an associate producer on Courage of Black Beauty (1957). During the 1930s he worked in Britain, including on several films made by Herbert Wilcox. For his editing of The Brave One, White received a Best Film Editing nomination for the 29th Academy Awards.

== Selected filmography ==
- The Broken Gate (1927)
- Monte Carlo (1930)
- Paramount on Parade (1930)
- Playboy of Paris (1930)
- The Vagabond King (1930)
- The Smiling Lieutenant (1931)
- The Doctor's Secret (1931)
- That's a Good Girl (1933)
- The Queen's Affair (1934)
- Brewster's Millions (1935)
- Peg of Old Drury (1935)
- The Amazing Quest of Ernest Bliss (1936)
- Talk of the Devil (1936)
- The Frog (1937)
- Sunset in Vienna (1937)
- Nurse Edith Cavell (1939)
- The Red House (1947)
- The Boy from Indiana (1950)
- The Girl on the Bridge (1951)
- Lady in the Iron Mask (1952)
- Red Snow (1952)
- Strange Fascination (1952)
- Circus of Love (1954)
- The Brave One (1956)
- Ghost Diver (1957)
- The Fly (1958)
