= Gambling House (film) =

1951 film by Ted Tetzlaff

- Theatrical release poster
- Directed by: Ted Tetzlaff
- Screenplay by: Marvin Borowsky; Allen Rivkin
- Story by: Erwin S. Gelsey (as Ervin Gelsey)
- Produced by: Warren B. Duff
- Starring: Victor Mature; Terry Moore; William Bendix
- Cinematography: Harry J. Wild
- Edited by: Roland Gross
- Music by: Roy Webb
- Production company: RKO Radio Pictures
- Distributed by: RKO Radio Pictures
- Release dates: February 23, 1951 (Los Angeles); March 18, 1951 (New York)
- Running time: 80 minutes
- Country: United States
- Language: English

Gambling House is a 1951 American crime film noir directed by Ted Tetzlaff and starring Victor Mature, Terry Moore and William Bendix.

== Plot ==
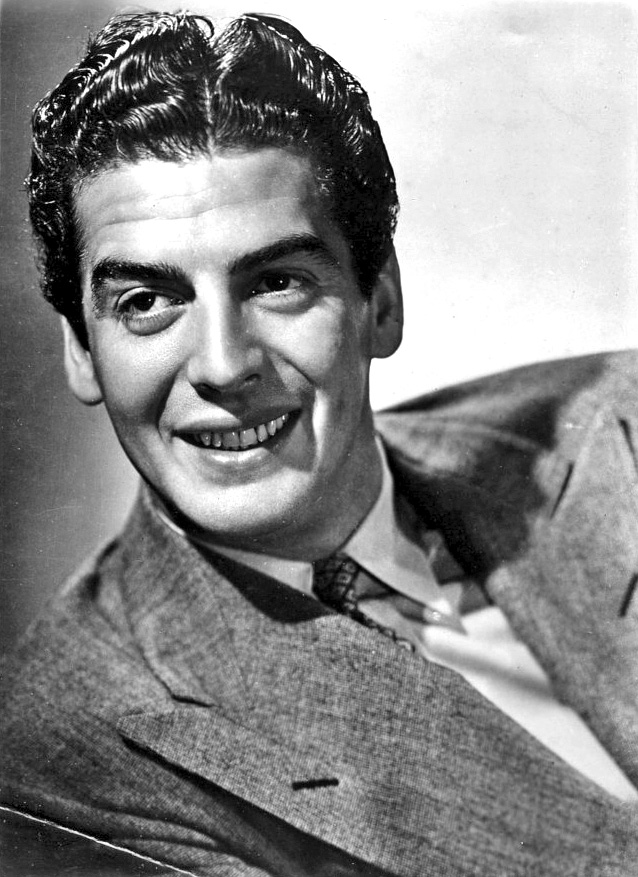
Victor Mature as Marc Fury

Marc Fury is a gambler living in New York City. One night, during a crooked craps game, he is shot and wounded during a confrontation with a gangster, Joe Farrow. Another man is shot dead by Farrow during the same incident. He offers Fury $50,000 if he will admit guilt to the shooting.

After being treated for his wound, Fury tells police that he shot the man in self-defense. Before going into court, Fury demands the money from Farrow. When Farrow says he doesn't have it, Fury grabs Farrow's book containing the names and contact information of clients of his numbers racket. Fury threatens to give the book to the police if Farrow doesn't produce the $50,000. During the trial, Farrow testifies that Fury shot the other man in self-defense and he is acquitted.

After the trial, Fury is detained by agents from the US Immigration and Naturalization Service for questioning. As an Italian national, he faces possible deportation as an undesirable alien. As he is being taken away, he slips Farrow's book into the pocket of a woman passing near him. Fury is placed in confinement at the Immigration facility on Ellis Island in New York Harbor.

Farrow and his lawyer visit Fury, offering to help him remain in the United States in exchange for the book. While at Ellis Island, Fury discovers the identity of the woman who has Farrow's book. Her name is Lynn Warren, daughter of a prominent lawyer; she helps recently arrived immigrants. Fury is released from custody pending his immigration hearing. He meets up with Warren, whom he finds very attractive. After he offers her help with a new family from Poland, Warren gives him the book and accepts his kiss.

During the immigration hearing, Fury tells the judge he doesn't know why he wants to stay in the United States. The hearing adjourned for a few days. in America, but knows he does. Fury visits Farrow again, demanding the money owed. Farrow says again that he does not have it.

When Fury leaves, Farrow orders his minion Sharkey and his men to follow Fury and recover the book. At Lynn's house, they beat up Fury and unsuccessfully search for the book. Fury then plots with his friend Willie to ambush Farrow at his New Jersey casino. Before leaving, Marc goes with Lynn to see the Polish family, who are being deported because their sponsorship failed. At the casino, Fury finally gets the money at gunpoint from Farrow. Lynn is very upset over Fury's casino visit. She reads him a poem from Thomas Wolfe poem about the "promise of America."

Moved by Lynn, Fury asks Willie to anonymously send the $50,000 to Lynn to help the Polish family. When Fury's immigration hearing resumes, he delivers a patriotic speech that persuades the judge to let him stay in the United States. After the hearing, Fury tells Lynn that she should forget him.

Later on, Farrow and his men catch up with Fury. In front of Sharky, Fury then accuses Farrow of using his men as "fall guys" for his misdeeds. When Farrow orders Sharky to shoot Marc, Sharky shoots Farrow instead. Fury walks off into the night.

== Cast ==
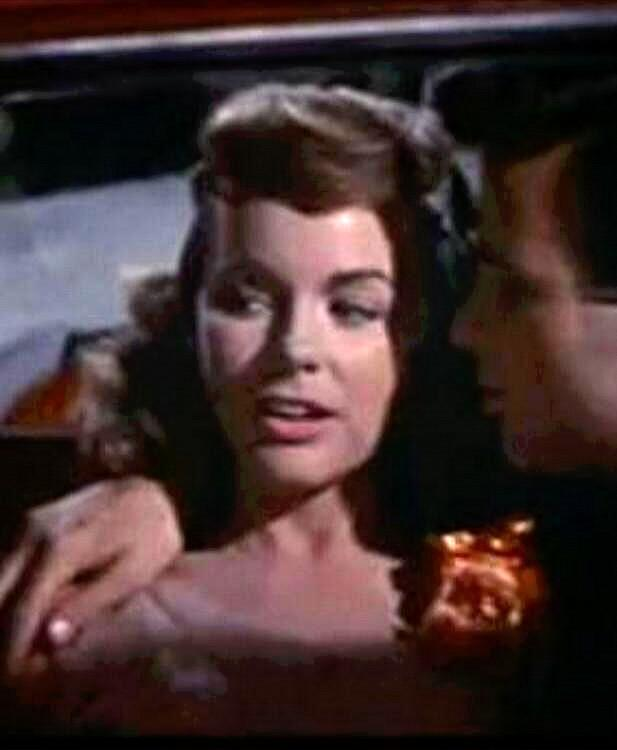
Terry Moore as Lynn Warren

- Victor Mature as Marc Fury
- Terry Moore as Lynn Warren
- William Bendix as Joe Farrow
- Zachary Charles as Willie (as Zachary A. Charles)
- Basil Ruysdael as Judge Ravinek
- Donald Randolph as Lloyd Crane
- Damian O'Flynn as Ralph Douglas
- Cleo Moore as Sally
- Ann Doran as Della
- Eleanor Audley as Mrs. Livingston
- Gloria Winters as B.J. Warren
- Don Haggerty as Sharky

== Production ==
The story, titled Mr. Whiskers by Erwin Gelsey, was purchased by RKO Pictures in 1947 and scheduled in 1948 as a vehicle for Victor Mature. At that time, he was a Twentieth Century-Fox player with a contractual obligation to star in one RKO film per year. However, the project was postponed to enable Mature to appear in Easy Living. Mature refused the assignment and was suspended by Twentieth Century-Fox.

In late 1949, RKO renamed the project as Alias Mike Fury, later to become Gambling House. The script was rewritten and Mature relented. Filming began in February 1950.

== Reception ==
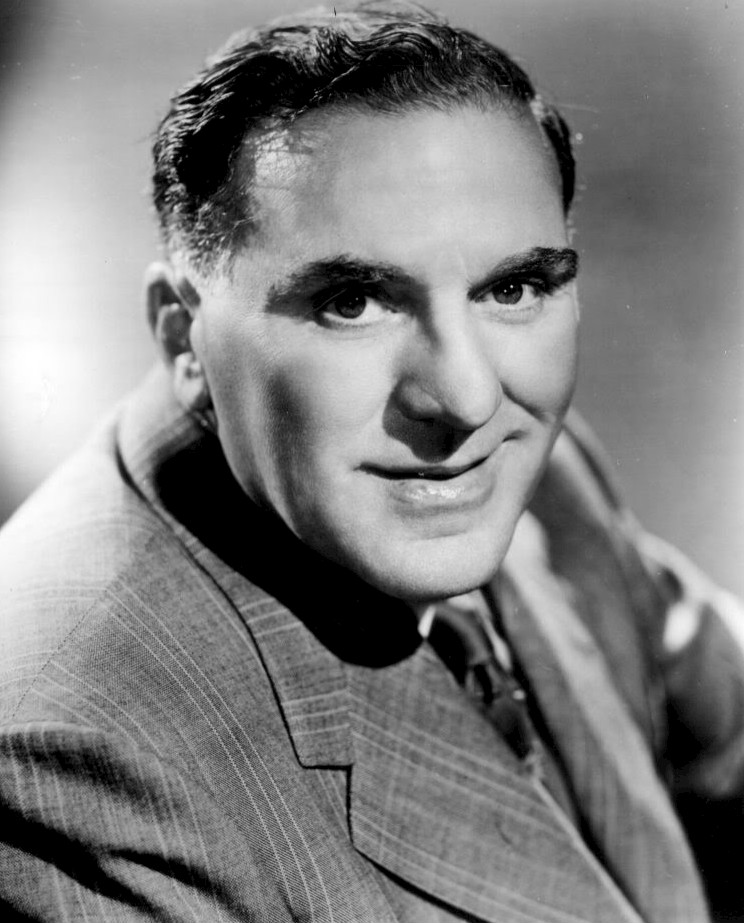
William Bendix as Joe Farrow

In a contemporary review for The New York Times, critic Bosley Crowther called the film "a run-of-the-mill melodrama" and wrote:

"Your chances for solid satisfaction from this tale of a crook who goes straight after meeting a decent young lady are about as good as they would be from a fixed wheel. ... Put it down as claptrap and the performance of Mr. Mature as another demonstration of an actor doing the best he can with a bad role. Miss Moore is entirely incidental and William Bendix is mulishly mean as the tough and deceitful rascal who crosses up Mr. Mature. To say any more about it might tend to incriminate somebody."

Critic Edwin Schallert of the Los Angeles Times wrote:

"The desire to avoid a straightaway melodrama on the part of those concerned may be commended, and their effort to inject a patriotic theme is good in principle. But actually these special values tend to defeat the melodramatic portion of the plot. The picture deals rather too sketchily with many tense and potentially suspenseful incidents, and does not carry power and conviction with it that normally belong to this type of production."
