= Hit and Run (1957 film) =

1957 film by Hugo Haas

- Theatrical release poster
- Directed by: Hugo Haas
- Screenplay by: Hugo Haas
- Story by: Herbert O. Phillips
- Produced by: Hugo Haas
- Starring: Cleo Moore; Hugo Haas; Vince Edwards
- Cinematography: Walter Strenge
- Edited by: Stefan Arnsten
- Music by: Franz Steininger
- Production company: Hugo Haas Productions
- Distributed by: United Artists
- Release date: March 15, 1957 (United States)
- Running time: 87 minutes
- Country: United States
- Language: English

Hit and Run is a 1957 American drama film noir directed by Hugo Haas starring Cleo Moore, Hugo Haas, and Vince Edwards.

The movie was Moore's final film appearance. She gained popularity earlier in the 1950s in B-movie film noirs released by Columbia Pictures, for which Moore was a contract player.

== Plot ==
Gus Hilmer, a moneyed garage, property and junkyard owner, falls in love with and marries a showgirl named Julie who is many years younger than himself. This causes tension between Hilmer and Frankie, Gus's young auto mechanic employee whom he has befriended, and treats like a son.

In due course, Frank and Julie develop an emotional attachment. Frank decides they must get rid of her husband. On a dark, remote road, Frankie runs down Gus with a car, killing him. He and Julie are free to be together and run the garage, although Julie is very disturbed by the murder, retreats from the relationship with Frank and begins drinking heavily.

When Gus's twin brother turns up, things become even more complicated as the two begin to wonder if the wrong man was murdered.

== Cast ==
- Cleo Moore as Julie Hilmer
- Hugo Haas as Gus Hilmer/Twin Brother
- Vince Edwards as Frank
- Dolores Reed as Miranda
- Mara Lea as Anita (Credited as Mari Lea)
- Pat Goldin as Undertaker
- John Zaremba as Doctor
- Robert Cassidy as Sheriff
- Carl Milletaire as Lawyer
- Dick Paxton as Waiter
- Julie Mitchum as Undertaker's Wife
- Steve Mitchell as Bartender
- Jan Englund as Clara
- Ella Mae Morse as Singer

== Production notes ==
John Zaremba, who played the doctor, would play hospital administrator Dr. Jensen on Ben Casey four years later, starring Vince Edwards. Dolores Reed was cast as Miranda while dating Hugo Haas.

Shown on the Turner Classic Movies show Noir Alley with Eddie Muller on September 4, 2022.
