= Women's Prison (1955 film) =

1955 film prison noir directed by Lewis Seiler

- Theatrical release poster
- Directed by: Lewis Seiler
- Screenplay by: Crane Wilbur; Jack DeWitt
- Story by: Jack DeWitt
- Produced by: Bryan Foy
- Starring: Ida Lupino; Jan Sterling; Cleo Moore; Audrey Totter; Phyllis Thaxter; Howard Duff
- Cinematography: Lester White
- Edited by: Henry Batista
- Production company: Columbia Pictures
- Distributed by: Columbia Pictures
- Release date: February 1955 (United States)
- Running time: 80 minutes
- Country: United States
- Language: English

Women's Prison is a 1955 American film noir crime film directed by Lewis Seiler and starring Ida Lupino, Jan Sterling, Cleo Moore, Audrey Totter, Phyllis Thaxter and Howard Duff.

The film is noted for the appearance of Moore, and for Lupino's performance as the aggressively cruel warden. In the 1980s, Sony Pictures subsequently released it in the boxed set Bad Girls of Film Noir: Volume II along with Night Editor, One Girl's Confession and Over-Exposed.

== Plot ==
A ruthless superintendent of a prison, Amelia van Zandt, makes life very hard for the female inmates. Her rules are rigid and she makes no exceptions.

The newcomer Helene Jensen is not a hardened criminal by any means, but a woman convicted of vehicular homicide after she accidentally killed a child. Out of place here, Helene is so distraught that Van Zandt has her placed in solitary confinement. When Helene goes into hysterics, Van Zandt has her put in a straitjacket. Helene nearly dies.

The prison has two wings, one for women, one for men. One of the inmates, Joan Burton, has been illicitly having conjugal relations late at night with her husband, Glen, a convict in the other wing. Now she is expecting a baby, and brutal men's warden Brock issues a stern warning to Van Zandt that she'd better find out how the two prisoners have been arranging these meetings.

Joan has the sympathy of the decent Dr. Crane, who's in charge of the infirmary, and disapproves of the cruel treatment of prisoners he sees. But the heartless Van Zandt goes into a literally homicidal rage while interrogating Joan about how Glen managed to visit her, beating the pregnant prisoner to the point of death. Dr. Crane tells Van Zandt and Brock that he will resign after treating her, and report them. Glen manages to sneak into the infirmary, where Crane lets him talk to Joan; she envisions their bright future with their baby after both have done their time, and dies.

A protest erupts in the women's cell block, beginning with a hunger strike organized by Joan's cellmate, Brenda Martin, then turning into a full-scale riot. Naive or timid inmates are swept up along with the vicious, veteran ones. Van Zandt is captured by the inmates; Dr. Crane pleads with them to leave it to the authorities to punish her for Joan's murder, but they refuse and menace her till the guards shoot tear gas and bullets into the wing. Glen, who has obtained a gun, comes looking for Van Zandt to kill her. She flees desperately from Glen, the other inmates and the gas, and Glen, wounded by the guards, confronts her with his gun in the padded cell she had put Helene in. Dr. Crane bursts in just in time to point out to Glen that the ordeal has driven her mad and he need not shoot her; raving, she is put in a straitjacket and taken away. Dr. Crane tells Brock he will no longer be warden after the prison board meets the next day. Helene is released and joyfully reunited with her husband.

== Cast ==
- Ida Lupino as Amelia Van Zandt
- Jan Sterling as Brenda Martin
- Cleo Moore as Mae
- Audrey Totter as Joan Burton
- Phyllis Thaxter as Helene Jensen
- Howard Duff as Dr. Crane
- Warren Stevens as Glen Burton
- Barry Kelley as Warden Brock
- Gertrude Michael as Matron Sturgess
- Vivian Marshall (actress) as Dottie LaRose
- Mae Clarke as Matron Saunders
- Ross Elliott as Don Jensen
- Adelle August as Grace
- Don C. Harvey as Chief Guard Tierney
- Juanita Moore as Polyclinic "Polly" Jones
- Edna Holland as Sarah Graham

== Reception ==
The staff at Variety praised some of the actresses in the film, "Sterling scores nicely as a tough moll, Cleo Moore is a typical femme inmate and Vivian Marshall, as an ex-stripteaser gone wrong, shines in some amusing impersonations."

== See also ==
- List of American films of 1955
