= Bait (1954 film) =

American noir film by Hugo Haas

- Theatrical release poster
- Directed by: Hugo Haas
- Screenplay by: Samuel W. Taylor; Hugo Haas
- Produced by: Hugo Haas
- Starring: Cleo Moore; Hugo Haas; John Agar
- Cinematography: Eddie Fitzgerald
- Edited by: Robert S. Eisen
- Music by: Václav Divina
- Production company: Hugo Haas Productions
- Distributed by: Columbia Pictures
- Release date: February 24, 1954 (United States)
- Running time: 80 minutes
- Country: United States
- Language: English

Bait is a 1954 American drama film, written, directed and produced by Hugo Haas. Haas himself, Cleo Moore and John Agar star in the film.

== Plot ==
Middle-aged Marko is searching for his gold mine, the entrance to which has been lost for nearly 20 years, at which time his partner died, a death for which some locals think he is to blame. To share expenses for a prospecting expedition he teams up with bright young Ray Brighton. When they find the mine, Marko decides he doesn't want to share with his partner and plans to murder him. He proposes to Peggy, a young widow with a baby to whom he knows Ray is attracted, and who Marko and the local people prefer to label as a 'fallen woman'. Marko tells her he is sorry he misjudged her, and she eventually accepts his proposal in order to obtain security for her child.

It beings to look as though Marko only wanted Peggy as an unpaid worker, but he also encourages her and Ray to be friendly, even to dance together, and some months later, at Christmas, Ray suggests that they split the gold three ways, since Peggy works just as hard as he and Marko do. Later, Marko says he forgot to get salt on the last trip into town, and that he will go for it the next day, returning the day after. While he is away, Ray and Peggy keep working, but also enjoy their evening together playing cards and talking. Ray tells Peggy he loves her but she says although she feels the same, she cannot betray Marko, to which Ray agrees. He goes to get some more tobacco, and finds a bag of salt where Marko hid it. He then spots a slightly melted spot in the ice on the windows, and realises Marko had been spying on them. Marko then bursts into the cabin, but Ray has hidden behind the door and knocks a weapon from Marko's hand. Ray says he now understands that Marko had deliberately pushed them together, then pretended to go into town so that he could come back unexpectedly, hoping to catch them in adultery, so he can use the "unwritten law" to kill Brighton and thus escape punishment from the law. Ray and Peggy pack up their things, and, leaving Marko his share of the gold, start off to walk to the highway and safety. As they leave, Marko lunges at Ray with a knife, but Ray pushes him away; Marko tries to get up, but realises he has broken his leg and that he will not survive the winter in the cabin on his own, an echo of the death of his previous partner.

== Cast ==
- Cleo Moore as Peggy
- Hugo Haas as Marko
- John Agar as Ray Brighton
- Emmett Lynn as Foley
- Bruno VeSota as Webb
- Jan Englund as Waitress
- George Keymas as Chuck
- Cedric Hardwicke as Prologue Speaker
