= The Other Woman (1954 film) =

1954 film by Hugo Haas

- Theatrical release poster
- Directed by: Hugo Haas
- Screenplay by: Hugo Haas
- Produced by: Hugo Haas
- Starring: Hugo Haas; Cleo Moore; John Qualen; Jan Arvan; Lance Fuller
- Cinematography: Eddie Fitzgerald
- Edited by: Robert S. Eisen
- Music by: Ernest Gold
- Production company: Hugo Haas Productions
- Distributed by: 20th Century Fox
- Release date: December 2, 1954 (United States)
- Running time: 81 minutes
- Country: United States
- Language: English

The Other Woman is a 1954 American film noir written, directed and produced by Hugo Haas. Haas, Cleo Moore and John Qualen starred in the film.

== Plot ==
After aspiring actress Sherry Stewart auditions for director Walter Darman but doesn't get the part, she decides to blackmail him.

Sherry and her boyfriend Ronnie cook up a scheme, drugging Darman's drink, lying to him later that he and Sherry had become intimate, then threatening to tell his wife unless Darman comes up with $50,000.

Darman decides to confront Sherry directly, but tempers flare and he strangles her to death. His wife Lucille chooses an inopportune time to confront the actress herself, finding the body. A police inspector suspects the truth and Darman's guilty conscience eventually forces him to confess.

== Cast ==
- Hugo Haas as Walter Darman
- Cleo Moore as Sherry Stewart
- Lance Fuller as Ronnie
- Lucille Barkley as Mrs. Lucille Darman
- Jack Macy as Charles Lester
- John Qualen as Papasha
- Jan Arvan as Police Inspector Collins
- Karolee Kelly as Marion

== Reception ==
=== Critical response ===
Film critic Dennis Schwartz dismissed the film as "...a dull film noir, suffering from an unconvincing plot, and dry acting." Cinema scholar Milan Hain is much more sympathetic to the film. "The Other Woman is Haas' most ambitious film, with many themes and motifs mirroring his own career: life in exile characterized by disillusionment and entrapment, loss of one's identity and social status, hopeless struggle with the Hollywood machinery, and the impossibility of fully realizing one's artistic visions."
