= Hugo Haas =

Czech actor and director (1901–1968)

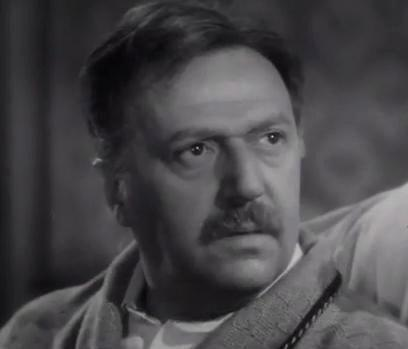
- Hugo Haas in Pickup (1951)
- Born: 19 February 1901; Brno, Moravia, Austria-Hungary
- Died: 1 December 1968 (aged 67); Vienna, Austria
- Occupations: Actor; film director; screenwriter; producer
- Years active: 1926–1962
- Spouse(s): Maria von Bibikoff (Czech: Marie Bibikovová-Haasová) (m. 1938)
- Children: 1
- Relatives: Pavel Haas (brother)

Hugo Haas (19 February 1901 – 1 December 1968) was a Czech film actor, director and writer. He appeared in more than 60 films from 1926 to 1962 and directed 20 films from 1933 to 1962.

== Life and career ==
Haas was born in Brno, Austria-Hungary (now in the Czech Republic), and he died in Vienna, Austria from complications of asthma. He and his brother Pavel Haas studied voice at the Brno Conservatory under composer Leoš Janáček. Pavel Haas went on to become a noted composer before he was killed in Auschwitz in 1944.

=== Czechoslovak theater and film ===
After graduating from the conservatory in 1920, Hugo Haas began acting at the National Theater in Brno, in Ostrava and in Olomouc. In 1924, he moved to Prague and regularly appeared at the Vinohrady Theatre, where he remained until 1929. In 1930, the Czech director, critic, and poet Karel Hugo Hilar made Haas a member of the Prague National Theatre drama company, where he remained until his emigration in 1939. One of his highly acclaimed roles was as Doctor Galén in The White Disease, which Karel Čapek had written especially for him. His final role at the National Theater was as Director Busman in Čapek's R.U.R.

Haas made his film debut as Notary Voborský in the silent film Jedenácté přikázání (The Eleventh Commandment) in 1923. (Twelve years later he played the same role again in Jedenácté přikázání directed by Martin Frič.) With the advent of sound film, Haas was able to apply his comedic talent in Svatopluk Innemann's Muži v offsidu in 1931. In 1936, he directed his first film Camel Through the Eye of a Needle (co-directed with Otakar Vávra). He later directed Kvočna (the film score was composed by his brother Pavel), The White Disease and Co se šeptá. His final comedy in Czechoslovakia was Miroslav Cikán's Andula Won, which appeared in cinemas in 1938.

=== Emigration ===
Following the 1938 Munich Agreement and the German occupation of Czechoslovakia in early 1939, Hugo Haas was dismissed from the National Theater due to his Jewish origin. In April he and his wife, Maria von Bibikoff fled via Paris and Spain and then from the port of Lisbon to the port of New York City in October–November 1940. Their son Ivan was taken in by his brother Pavel. Hugo Haas' father Lipmann (Zikmund) Haas and brother Pavel died at Nazi concentration camps during the Holocaust.

=== United States ===
By the mid-1940s, Haas had become a character actor in American films. In 1951, he launched a career as a film director in Hollywood with a string of B movie melodramas, usually starring blonde actresses in the role of a predatory mantrap. Haas usually cast himself as the male lead in the films, but the female role almost always dominated the storyline and was usually exclusively promoted on film posters. His work also includes the touching drama The Girl on the Bridge (1951) – which he co-wrote, directed and starred in – about a kindly watchmaker who after having lost his wife and family in the Holocaust, befriends, marries, and raises a second family with a young woman he saves from suicide.

Cleo Moore starred in six films for Haas, becoming a well-known film star in that era. Other actresses who starred in Haas' films included Beverly Michaels and Carol Morris. The Haas pictures featured well-known names, including Eleanor Parker, John Agar, Vince Edwards, Rock Hudson, Joan Blondell, Agnes Moorehead, Julie London, Corinne Griffith, and Marie Windsor.

Haas's final film Paradise Alley was rejected by the major studios and sat unreleased for over three years, finally surfacing in a limited run in 1962.

=== Production company ===
Haas's first American film was bankrolled out of his own pocket for $85,000. The financial success of Pickup led to the creation of the independent Hugo Haas Productions, which he used to produce 12 of his 14 American films from 1951 to 1959. Independent studios were not atypical at this time, but Haas' operating procedures were. He financed his own films, and the budgets were minuscule compared to most Hollywood fare. While his films' budgets usually ran from $80,000 to $100,000, the average cost for a Hollywood picture in 1955 was $1.5 million. He did not secure distribution deals with larger studios until after the movies were made, sometimes delaying their release for months or even years. While Hollywood studios practiced division of labor, with well defined and distinct roles for workers, Haas was described as a "one-man production team," having financed, produced, written, and directed all of his Hugo Haas productions, and having acted in all but one.

=== Return to Europe ===
In the late 1950s, Haas returned to Europe. After a brief stay in Italy, he settled in Vienna in 1961, where he made occasional appearances on television. Except for a brief visit during the centennial celebrations for the National Theater in Prague in 1963, he never returned to his homeland but was buried there, in Brno. His wife Maria died in 2009, aged 92.

== Selected filmography ==
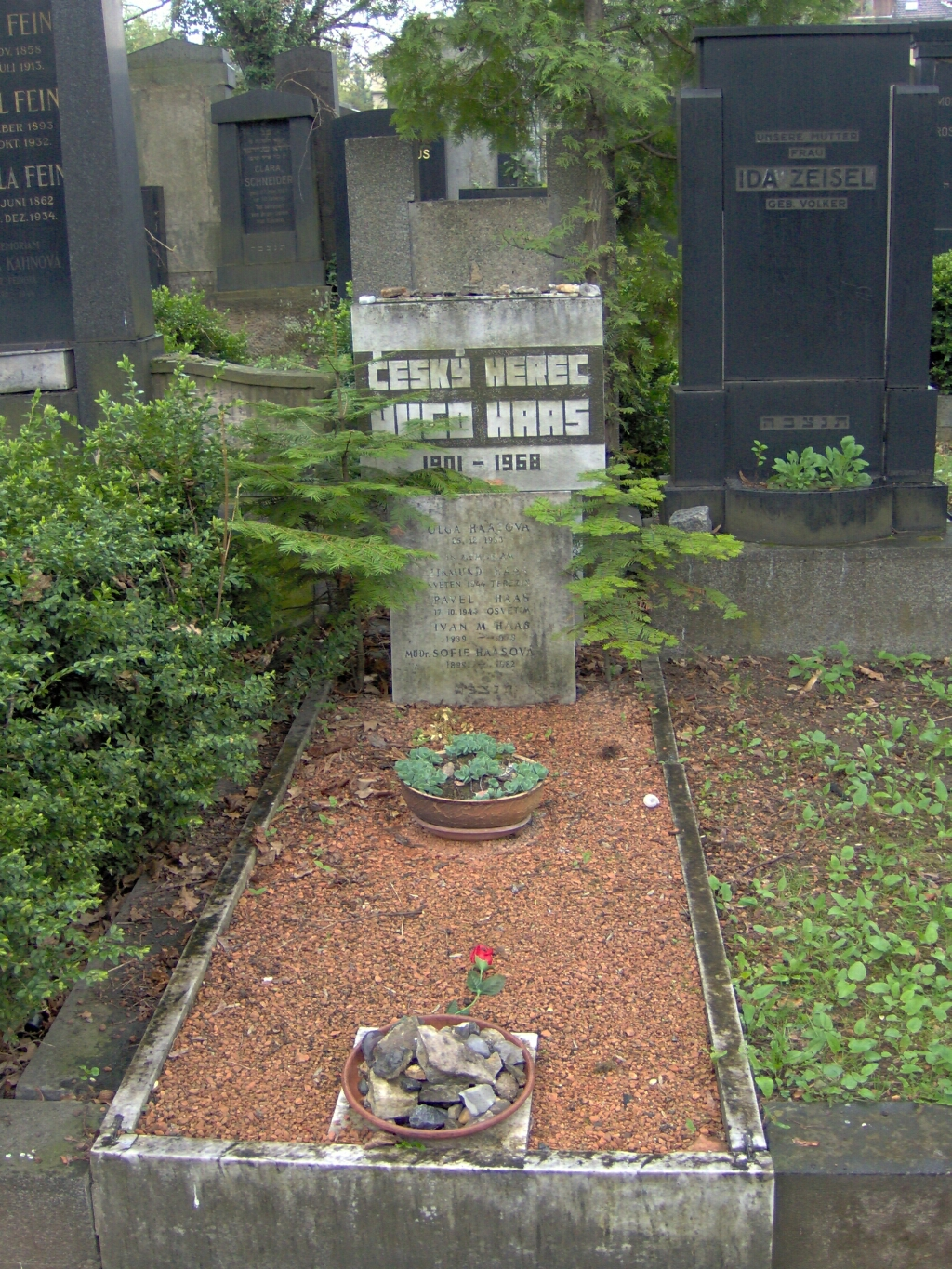
Grave of Hugo Haas at the Jewish Cemetery in Brno

=== As director ===
- Velbloud uchem jehly (1936)
- Děvčata, nedejte se! (1937)
- Kvočna (1937)
- Co se šeptá (1938)
- Skeleton on Horseback (after The White Disease) (1937)
- Pickup (1951)
- The Girl on the Bridge (1951)
- Strange Fascination (1952)
- One Girl's Confession (1953)
- Thy Neighbor's Wife (1953)
- Bait (1954)
- The Other Woman (1954)
- Hold Back Tomorrow (1955)
- Edge of Hell (1956)
- Hit and Run (1957)
- Lizzie (1957)
- Night of the Quarter Moon (1958)
- Born to Be Loved (1959)
- Paradise Alley (1962)

=== As actor ===
- The Eleventh Commandment (1925) - Jirí Voborský
- From the Czech Mills (1925) - Baron Zachariás Zlámaný
- Když struny lkají (1930) - a gentleman in a bar
- The Last Bohemian (1931) - MUDr. Katz
- Muži v offsidu (1931) - Načeradec
- Načeradec, král kibicu (1931) - Richard Načeradec, businessman
- Kariéra Pavla Camrdy (1931) - Vokoun
- Obrácení Ferdyše Pištory (1932) - Richard Rosenstok, banker
- Zapadlí vlastenci (1932) - Adam Hejnu, shoemaker
- Madla z cihelny (1933) - Jan Dolanský
- The House in the Suburbs (1933) - Zajícek
- Její lékar (1933) - Pavel Hodura, painter
- Life Is a Dog (1933) - Skladatel Viktor Honzl / Prof. Alfréd Rokos
- Sister Angelika (1933) - Pavel Ryant
- Okénko (1933) - Lecturer Jakub Johánek
- The Last Man (1934) - Prof. Alois Kohout
- The Little Pet (1934) - Dr. Alois Pech, vezenský knihovník
- Long Live with Dearly Departed (1935) - Petr Suk
- The Eleventh Commandment (1935) - Jiri Vobosky
- Paradise Road (1936) - Tobiás
- The Seamstress (1936) - Francois Lorrain - Parisian fashion king
- Three Men in the Snow (1936) - Továrník Eduard Bárta
- Devcata, nedejte se! (1937) - Prof. Emanuel Pokorný
- Morality Above All Else (1937) - Professor Antonín Karas
- Andula Won (1937) - Pavel Haken
- The White Disease (1937) - Dr. Galen
- Co se šeptá (1938) - Vilém Gregor
- Svět kde se žebrá (1938) - Josef Dostál, beggar-millionaire
- Camel Through the Eye of a Needle (1939) - Žebrák Josef Pešta
- Days of Glory (1944) - Fedor
- Summer Storm (1944) - Anton Urbenin
- Strange Affair (1944) - Domino / Constantine
- Mrs. Parkington (1944) - Balkan King (uncredited)
- The Princess and the Pirate (1944) - Proprietor 'Bucket of Blood'
- Secret Documents (1945) - Morenius
- A Bell for Adano (1945) - Father Pensovecchio
- Jealousy (1945) - Hugo Kral
- Dakota (1945) - Marko Poli
- What Next, Corporal Hargrove? (1945) - Mayor Quidoc
- Two Smart People (1946) - Señor Rodriquez
- Holiday in Mexico (1946) - Angus, Evans' butler
- The Private Affairs of Bel Ami (1947) - Monsieur Walter
- Fiesta (1947) - Maximino Contreras
- Northwest Outpost (1947) - Prince Nickolai Balinin
- The Foxes of Harrow (1947) - Otto Ludenbach
- Merton of the Movies (1947) - Von Strutt - Director
- My Girl Tisa (1948) - Tescu
- Casbah (1948) - Omar
- For the Love of Mary (1948) - Gustav Heindel
- The Fighting Kentuckian (1949) - Gen. Paul De Marchand
- King Solomon's Mines (1950) - Van Brun, aka Smith
- Vendetta (1950) - Brando - a Bandit
- Pickup (1951) - Jan Horak
- The Girl on the Bridge (1951) - David
- Strange Fascination (1952) - Paul Marvan
- One Girl's Confession (1953) - Dragomie Damitrof
- Thy Neighbor's Wife (1953) - Town Judge Raphael Vojnar
- Bait (1954) - Marko
- The Other Woman (1954) - Walter Darman
- Edge of Hell (1956) - Valentine
- Hit and Run (1957) - Gus Hilmer / Twin Brother
- Lizzie (1957) - Walter Brenner
- Born to Be Loved (1959) - Prof. Brauner
- Paradise Alley (1962) - Mr. Agnus
