= Anthony Jochim =

American film, stage and television actor

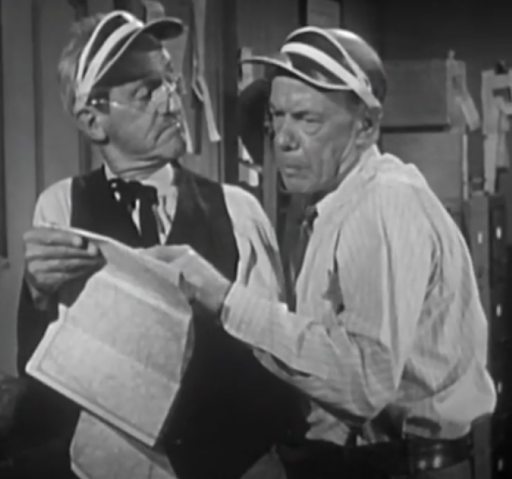
- Jochim (left) with Russell Collins in Man with a Camera, 1958
- Born: Anton Felix Jochim Jr. January 14, 1892; Jersey City, New Jersey, U.S.
- Died: April 10, 1978 (aged 86); Waynesville, North Carolina, U.S.
- Occupation: Actor
- Years active: 1918–1971

Anton Felix Jochim Jr. (January 14, 1892 – April 10, 1978) was an American film, stage and television actor.

== Life and career ==
Jochim was born in Jersey City, New Jersey. He began his stage career in 1918, appearing in the Broadway play As You Like It. He appeared in such other plays as Monte Cristo J, The Treasure, The Passing Show of 1921, Cyrano de Bergerac and One Good Year. According to The Record, he was a Shakespearean actor. He was also a stage manager for stage plays. He began his screen career in 1948, appearing in the film The Saxon Charm. In the same year, he appeared in the film He Walked by Night.

Later in his career, Joachim made his television debut in the syndicated detective television series The Boston Blackie. He guest-starred in numerous television programs including Bonanza, The Andy Griffith Show (and its spin-off Mayberry R.F.D.), Get Smart, The Virginian, Frontier Circus, Star Trek: The Original Series, Peter Gunn, Combat!, The Wild Wild West, Riverboat, Tombstone Territory and Perry Mason. In 1953, he starred as Sima in the film Thy Neighbor's Wife, starring along with Cleo Moore, Hugo Haas, Ken Carlton, Kathleen Hughes and Tom Fadden. He also appeared in numerous films such as Ada, The Shakiest Gun in the West, Dragon's Gold, The Jazz Singer, The Killer That Stalked New York, All That Heaven Allows, Dangerous Crossing, City of Bad Men, Hot Spell, The Legend of Tom Dooley and Spartacus.

Jochim retired from acting in 1971, last appearing in the film The Brotherhood of Satan.

== Death ==
Joachim died on April 10, 1978, at the Haywood County Hospital in Waynesville, North Carolina, at the age of 86.
