= Pickup =

Pickup(s), pick-up, or pick up may refer to:

== Film ==
- Pick-Up (1933 film), a crime film starring Sylvia Sidney and George Raft
- Pickup (1951 film), an American film noir directed by Hugo Haas
- Pick-Up (1975 film), an exploitation film directed by Bernard Hirschenson
- The Pickup (film), a 2025 American heist action comedy film starring Eddie Murphy, Keke Palmer, Pete Davidson, and Eva Longoria
- Pick up (documentary), a 2005 documentary film directed by Lucia Sanchez
- Pick-up (filmmaking), minor shots filmed after the primary filming of a movie to augment what has already been shot
- Pickups, a 2017 British film directed by Jamie Thraves

== Music ==
=== Songs ===
- "Pickup" (song), by MacKenzie Porter
- "Pick Up", by Dierks Bentley from Black (Dierks Bentley album)

=== Other uses in music ===
- Pick-Up (band), a Ukrainian alternative rock band
- Pickup (music technology), an electromagnetic device which detects vibrations from a musical instrument
- Pickup group or pickup band, a musical ensemble brought together for only a few performances
- Pick-up notes or anacrusis, note or sequence of notes which precedes the first downbeat in a bar

== People ==
- Ronald Pickup (1940–2021), British actor
- Thomas Pickup, rugby league footballer of the 1920s for Wakefield Trinity
- Tim Pickup (1948–2021), Australian rugby league footballer
- Shih-Te (fl. 9th century), a Tang Dynasty Chinese Buddhist poet (literally "Pick-Up" or "Foundling")

== Technology ==
- Phonograph pickup, a transducer used for the playback of gramophone records on a turntable or phonograph
- Pickup (electromotive power), a device used by electric locomotives, trams, etc. to acquire electric power from overhead wires, third rails, etc.
- Pickup (music technology), an electromagnetic device which detects vibrations from a musical instrument
  - Magnetic pickup, a type of pickup used on musical instruments
- Pickup forceps, a handheld, hinged instrument used for grasping and holding objects
- Pickup truck or pick-up truck, a light truck with an open-top rear cargo area
  - Isuzu Pickup, a pickup truck marketed in the United States by Isuzu
  - Isuzu Pickup Truck, a pickup truck marketed in Columbia by Isuzu
  - Peugeot Pick Up, a pickup truck marketed in Africa as a rebadged Dongfeng Rich
  - Toyota Pickup, a pickup truck marketed in the United States by Toyota
- Pickup tube, a type of cathode ray tube

== Other uses ==
- Pick Up, original name for British music magazine Jazz Journal
- Pick Up!, a chocolate-dipped snack bar from Bahlsen
- Pick-Up, a 1955 novel by Charles Willeford
- Pick-up (gaming), anything collected while playing a video game
- The Pickup, a 2001 novel by Nadine Gordimer
- The Pick Up, an Australian drive radio show with Brittany Hockley and Laura Byrne
- The PickUp, a free weekend-only nighttime shuttle bus service operating a single route along Santa Monica Boulevard in West Hollywood, California

== See also ==
- Pickup artist, a person (usually a man) who is skilled in the art of the 'pickup'; meeting, attracting, and seducing women
- Pick-up game, a game spontaneously started by a group of players
- Pick-up hockey, an informal type of ice hockey
- Pick-up line, a conversation opener to engage an unfamiliar person for romance or dating
