= Leontovich =

Leontovich (Russian: Леонтович), Leantovich (Belarusian: Леантовіч) or Leontovych (Ukrainian: Леонтович) is a patronymic surname of East Slavic origin. Polish equivalent: Leontowicz, Lithuanian: Leantavičius Notable people with the surname include:

- Eugenie Leontovich (1900 – 1993), Russian-American actress
- Kostya Leontovich (born 1985), Ukrainian composer
- Mikhail Leontovich (1903 – 1981), Soviet physicist
- Mykola Leontovych (1877 – 1921), Ukrainian composer
- Volodymyr Leontovych (1866 – 1933), Ukrainian writer and politician
- Yevhen Leontovych (born 1932), Soviet footballer

== See also ==
- 21397 Leontovich (1998 FJ54), a main-belt asteroid
- Leonovich
