= Percy Helton =

American actor (1894–1971)

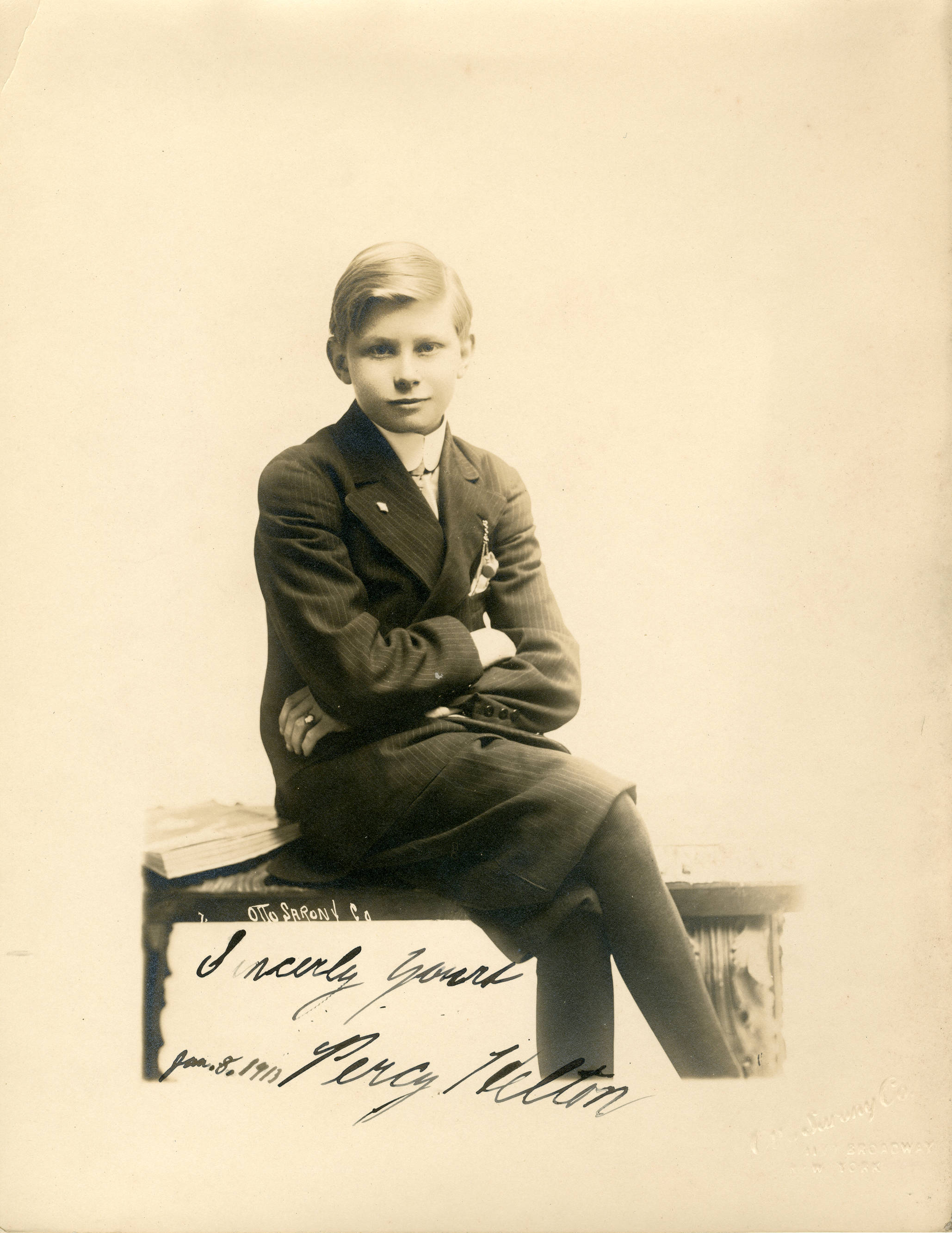
- Helton in 1913
- Born: Percy Alfred Michel; January 31, 1894; Manhattan, New York City, U.S.
- Died: September 11, 1971 (aged 77); Hollywood, Los Angeles, California, U.S.
- Resting place: Pierce Brothers Westwood Village Memorial Park and Mortuary
- Occupation: Actor
- Years active: 1896–1970
- Spouse: Edna Eustace (m. 1931)

Percy Alfred Helton (January 31, 1894 – September 11, 1971) was an American stage, film, and television actor. He was one of the most familiar faces and voices in Hollywood of the 1950s.

== Career ==
Helton was born in Manhattan. He began acting at the age of two, appearing in vaudeville acts with his British-born father William Alfred "Alf" Helton. He was a cast member in the Broadway production of Julie BonBon (1906). Helton performed in stock theater and the Broadway plays The Poor Nut and To the Ladies.

Helton joined the U.S. Army during World War I. Deployed to Europe with the American Expeditionary Forces, he was awarded the Distinguished Service Cross for his duty with the 77th Infantry Division's 305th Field Artillery. During his time in the Army he was a member of the Argonne Players, a company of actors in the 77th Division who entertained other soldiers.

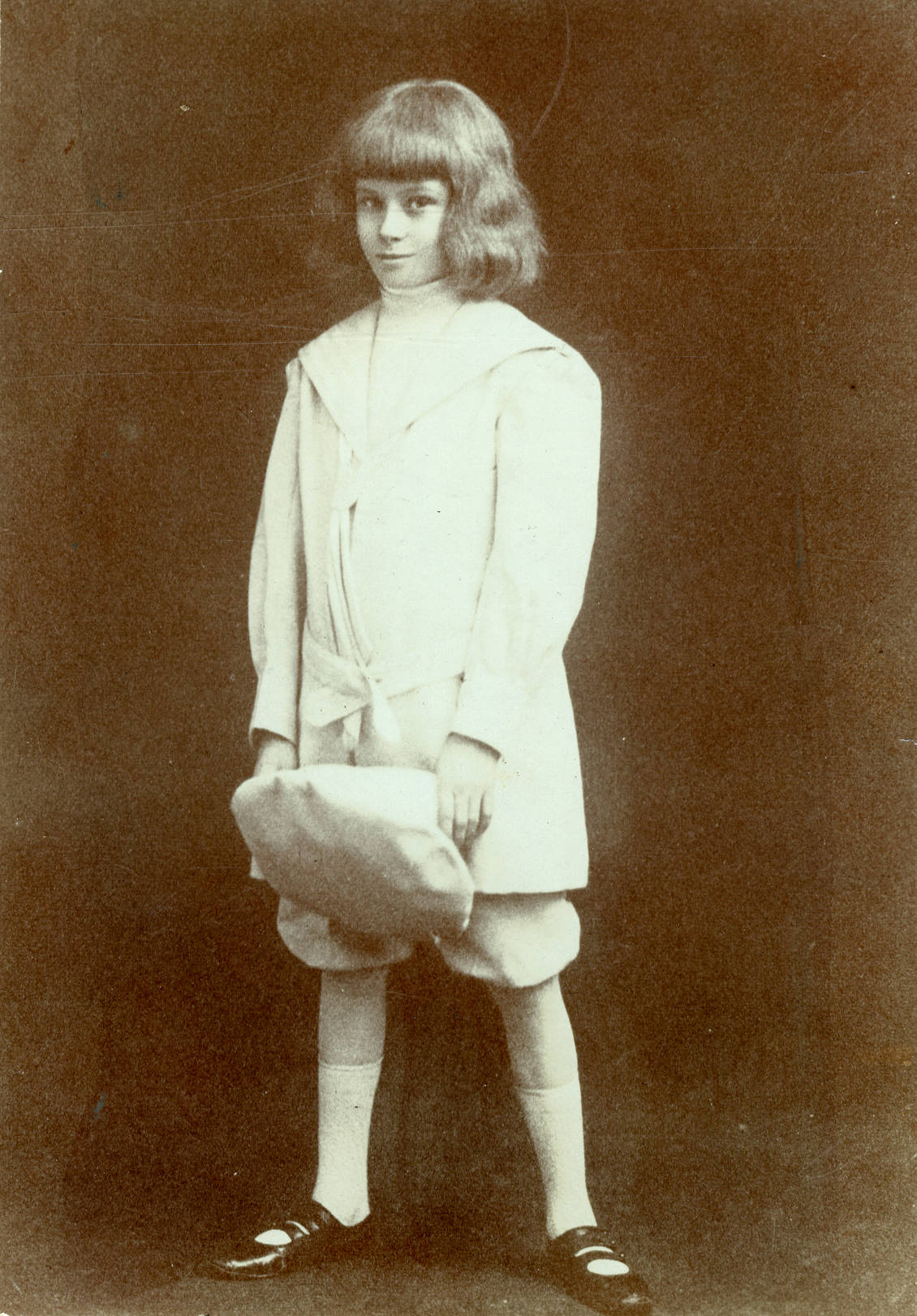
Stage juvenile Helton (early 1900s)

A change in his voice altered Helton's career. He remained in acting but chiefly as a character actor in a wide range of films and television programs in the 1950s and 1960s. Among those programs were three guest appearances on Perry Mason, including the role of Asa Cooperman in the 1961 episode "The Case of the Pathetic Patient", as a pawn broker in the 1961 episode "The Case of the Torrid Tapestry", and as a hotel clerk in the 1965 episode "The Case of the Careless Kitten."

Films in which he performed included the small role in the Christmas comedy classic Miracle on 34th Street (1947), the films noir Criss Cross (1949), The Crooked Way (1949), The Set-Up (1949), Wicked Woman (1953), and Kiss Me Deadly (1955), and the comic Western Butch Cassidy and the Sundance Kid (1969).

== Personal life and death ==
On October 24, 1931, in the heart of Manhattan's Theater District, Helton married dancer and fellow actor Edna Roberta Eustace (1912-1976) at The Actor's Chapel at St. Malachy's Church. Throughout the course of their marriage, the Heltons appeared onstage together from time to time, most frequently in productions staged by the Masquers Club during the 1960s.

Helton died on September 11, 1971, in Hollywood, California.

== Partial filmography ==
- The Fairy and the Waif (1915) as The Waif
- The Flower of Faith (1916) as Tom Judson
- The Master Mind (1920) as Younger brother
- Silver Wings (1922) as John (play)
- Insinuation (1922) as Jimmie
- The Offenders (1922)
- Frankie and Johnny (1936) as Undetermined role (uncredited)
- Miracle on 34th Street (1947) as Drunken Santa Claus (uncredited)
- Call Northside 777 (1948) as William Decker, Mailman (uncredited)
- Let's Live Again (1948) as Mr. President
- Hazard (1948) as Beady Robbins
- Larceny (1948) as Charlie Jordan
- That Wonderful Urge (1948) as Monroe Township Jail Drunk (uncredited)
- Chicken Every Sunday (1949) as Mr. Sawyer (uncredited)
- Criss Cross (1949) as Frank
- Alias Nick Beal (1949) as Lawyer (uncredited)
- The Set-Up (1949) as Red
- The Crooked Way (1949) as Petey
- Lust for Gold (1949) as Barber (uncredited)
- Red, Hot and Blue (1949) as Mr. Perkins, Stage Manager
- Abbott & Costello Meet The Killer, Boris Karloff (1949) as Abernathy
- Thieves' Highway (1949) as Roadside Bar Manager (uncredited)
- My Friend Irma (1949) as Mr. Clyde
- Free for All (1949) as Joe Hershey
- The Secret Fury (1950) as Justice of the Peace Roy T. Palmer (uncredited)
- Tyrant of the Sea (1950) as Crewman (uncredited)
- Harbor of Missing Men (1950) as 'Rummy' Davis
- Wabash Avenue (1950) as Ship Captain (uncredited)
- Riding High (1950) as Pawnbroker (uncredited)
- Fancy Pants (1950) as Mayor Fogarty (uncredited)
- A Life of Her Own (1950) as Hamburger Proprietor (uncredited)
- Copper Canyon (1950) as 'Scamper' Joad
- The Sun Sets at Dawn (1950) as Reporter, Feature Syndicate
- Cyrano de Bergerac (1950) as Bellerose
- Under Mexicali Stars (1950) as Nap Wellington
- Three Guys Named Mike (1951) as Mr. Hawkins, Hotel Manager
- Inside Straight (1951) as Lawyer Anderson (uncredited)
- Night Into Morning (1951) as Drunk (uncredited)
- Never Trust a Gambler (1951) as Sunbeam Liquor Store Clerk (uncredited)
- Darling, How Could You! (1951) as Cabbie (uncredited)
- The Tall Target (1951) as Beamish, Passenger in Club Car (uncredited)
- Chain of Circumstance (1951) as Fogel
- The Family Secret (1951) as Charlie (uncredited)
- The Barefoot Mailman (1951) as Dewey Durgan (uncredited)
- The Stooge (1952) as Sam Robertson (uncredited)
- A Girl in Every Port (1952) as Drive-In Manager
- The Belle of New York (1952) as Presents Angela with Flowers (uncredited)
- I Dream of Jeanie (1952) as Mr. Horker
- Three for Bedroom "C" (1952) as Alcoholic Train Passenger (uncredited)
- She's Back on Broadway (1953) as News Vendor (scenes deleted)
- Call Me Madam (1953) as Senator Wilkins
- Scared Stiff (1953) as Man in Hotel Hallway (uncredited)
- Ambush at Tomahawk Gap (1953) as Marlowe
- Ride, Vaquero! (1953) as Storekeeper (uncredited)
- Vice Squad (1953) as Mr. Jenner (uncredited)
- Down Laredo Way (1953) as Judge Sully
- The Affairs of Dobie Gillis (1953) as Mr. Hammersmith, Book Seller (uncredited)
- City of Bad Men (1953) as Old-Timer at Training Camp (uncredited)
- The Robe (1953) as Caleb - Wine Merchant (uncredited)
- How to Marry a Millionaire (1953) as Mr. Benton (uncredited)
- Wicked Woman (1953) as Charlie Borg
- Geraldine (1953) as Pop (uncredited)
- Lucky Me (1954) as Brown (uncredited)
- About Mrs. Leslie (1954) as Mr. Hackley
- A Star Is Born (1954) as William Gregory (uncredited)
- The Adventures of Hajji Baba (1954) as Kerbelai, Hajji's Barber Father (uncredited)
- White Christmas (1954) as Train Conductor (uncredited)
- 20,000 Leagues Under the Sea (1954) as Coach Driver
- Crashout (1955) as Doctor Louis Barnes
- Kiss Me Deadly (1955) as Doc Kennedy
- Jail Busters (1955) as Warden B.W. Oswald
- Trial (1955) as Youval (uncredited)
- Alfred Hitchcock Presents (1955) as Darel O. Eaton, funeral director
- No Man's Woman (1955) as Otto Peterson
- Diane (1956) as Court Jester (uncredited)
- Fury at Gunsight Pass (1956) as Peter Boggs
- Terror at Midnight (1956) as Speegie
- The Boss (1956) as Hotel Clerk (uncredited)
- Shake, Rattle & Rock! (1956) as Hiram, the Funeral Director
- The Phantom Stagecoach (1957) as Mr. Wiggins
- The Vintage (1957) as Voice Dub for Berger (uncredited)
- This Could Be the Night (1957) as Charlie (uncredited)
- Spook Chasers (1957) as Mike Clancy
- The Last Stagecoach West (1957) as Telegrapher (uncredited)
- Jailhouse Rock (1957) as Sam Brewster (uncredited)
- The Sheepman (1958) as Station Master (uncredited)
- The Proud Rebel (1958) as Photographer (uncredited)
- Rally 'Round the Flag, Boys! (1958) as Waldo Pike, the Plumber (uncredited)
- Ask Any Girl (1959) as Janitor in Meg Wheeler's Building (uncredited)
- Let No Man Write My Epitaph (1960) as Baldy (uncredited)
- Where the Boys Are (1960) as Fairview Motel Manager (uncredited)
- Ride the High Country (1962) as Luther Samson (uncredited)
- The Music Man (1962) as Train Conductor (uncredited)
- The Wheeler Dealers (1963) as Deke (uncredited)
- 4 for Texas (1963) as Jonas Ansel
- Get Yourself A College Girl (1964) as Senator's Chauffeur (uncredited)
- Hush...Hush, Sweet Charlotte (1964) as Funeral Director
- Dear Brigitte (1965) as Kraft, Man at Computer Lab (uncredited)
- Zebra in the Kitchen (1965) as Mr. Richardson
- The Sons of Katie Elder (1965) as Mr. Peevey
- Don't Worry, We'll Think of a Title (1966) as Diner Customer (uncredited)
- A Big Hand for the Little Lady (1966) as Kevin McKenzie (uncredited)
- The Green Hornet (1966) as Gus
- The Big Mouth (1967) as Sanitation Man (uncredited)
- Head (1968) as Heraldic Messenger
- Butch Cassidy and the Sundance Kid (1969) as Sweetface (uncredited)
- The Day of the Wolves (1971) as The Farmer
- Legend of the Northwest (1978) as Doc Graham

== Television appearances ==
- Dangerous Assignment (1952) (TV series) (Season 1 Episode 29: "The Red Queen Story") as Max
- Adventures of Superman (1953) (Season 2 Episode 10: "The Face and the Voice") as Hamlet
- Death Valley Days (1953-1958) (3 episodes)
  - (Season 1 Episode 17: "Little Oscar's Millions") (1953) as Little Oscar
  - (Season 4 Episode 8: "The Hangman Waits") (1955) as Alex Grant
  - (Season 7 Episode 6: "Big Liz") (1958) as Scrubby
- The Life of Riley (1953-1956) (3 episodes) as Mr. Cox
  - (Season 2 Episode 10: "Riley's Burning Ambition") (1953)
  - (Season 2 Episode 13: "Riley the Worrier") (1953)
  - (Season 4 Episode 20: "Riley's Raffle") (1956)
- The Lone Ranger (1955) (Season 4 Episode 18: "Dan Reid's Sacrifice") as Pete Travis
- Alfred Hitchcock Presents (1955–1961) (7 episodes)
  - (Season 1 Episode 2: "Premonition") (1955) as Gerald Eaton
  - (Season 1 Episode 24: "The Perfect Murder") (1956) as Lawyer
  - (Season 1 Episode 38: "The Creeper") (1956) as George the Janitor
  - (Season 2 Episode 16: "Nightmare in 4-D") (1957) as Charlie the Building Super
  - (Season 3 Episode 27: "Disappearing Trick") (1958) as Newspaperman
  - (Season 6 Episode 22: "The Horseplayer") (1961) as Morton
  - (Season 7 Episode 10: "Services Rendered") (1961) as Cyrus Rutherford
- Father Knows Best (1957) (Season 3 Episode 24: "Trip to Hillsborough") as Desk Clerk
- Science Fiction Theatre (1957) (Season 2 Episode 36: "Gravity Zero") as Professor John Hustead
- The Adventures of Rin-Tin-Tin (1957-1959) (3 episodes)
  - (Season 3 Episode 16: "Higgins' Last Stand") (1957) as Conductor
  - (Season 4 Episode 24: "Wind-Wagon McClanahan") (1958) as Ichabod Pillajohn
  - (Season 5 Episode 22: "Pillajohn's Progress") (1959) as Ichabod Pillajohn
- Maverick (1957–1960) (2 episodes)
  - (Season 1 Episode 14: "Comstock Conspiracy") (1957) as Mr. Venner
  - (Season 4 Episode 11: "Bolt from the Blue") (1960) as Bradley
- Lassie (1959) (Season 6 Episode 14: "In Case of Emergency") as Jason Blalock
- Lawman (1959–1961) (3 episodes)
  - (Season 2 Episode 7: "Shadow Witness") (1959) as Oren, the murder witness
  - (Season 3 Episode 7: "Dilemma") (1960) as Ellery Purvy
  - (Season 4 Episode 9: "The Cold One") (1961) as Thatcher
- Gunsmoke (1959–1966) (5 episodes)
  - (Season 5 Episode 16: "Thick 'N' Thin") (1959) as Otie
  - (Season 7 Episode 29: "The Summons") (1962) as Duffer
  - (Season 9 Episode 31: "Trip West") (1964) as Arbuckle
  - (Season 11 Episode 18: "The Raid: Part 1") (1966) as Mr. Early
  - (Season 11 Episode 19: "The Raid: Part 2") (1966) as Mr. Early
- Bonanza (1959–1967) (4 episodes)
  - (Season 1 Episode 5: "Enter Mark Twain") (1959) as Blurry Jones
  - (Season 4 Episode 21: "The Hayburner") (1963) as Lafe
  - (Season 5 Episode 11: "The Legacy") (1963) as Pete
  - (Season 8 Episode 20: "The Unseen Wound") (1967) as Bleeker
- The Untouchables (1960) (2 episodes)
  - (Season 1 Episode 16: "The St. Louis Story") as Mr. Meyer
  - (Season 1 Episode 21: "The Unhired Assassin: Part 2") as Jocko Monaghan
- The Texan (1960) (Season 2 Episode 29: "The Guilty and the Innocent") as Lem Munson
- Law of the Plainsman (1960) (Season 1 Episode 23: "Dangerous Barriers") as Del Martin
- Mr. Lucky (1960) (Season 1 Episode 21: "Big Squeeze") as Pop Markel
- Sugarfoot (1960-1961) (2 episodes)
  - (Season 3 Episode 19: "Funeral at Forty Mile") (1960) as Doc Lever
  - (Season 4 Episode 7: "Angel") (1961) as John McTavish
- Cheyenne (1961) (Season 6 Episode 6: "Retaliation") as Matthew Beasely
- Rawhide (1961) (Season 3 Episode 30: "Incident of the Wager on Payday") as Bartender
- Laramie (1961–1963) (3 episodes)
  - (Season 2 Episode 23: "Run of the Hunted") (1961) as Wes Snyder, Auctioneer
  - (Season 3 Episode 3: "Siege at Jubilee") (1961) as Clemson Frazer
  - (Season 4 Episode 21: "The Renegade Brand") (1963) as Opie
- Perry Mason (1961–1965) (3 episodes)
  - (Season 4 Episode 23: "The Case of the Torrid Tapestry") (1961) as Pawnbroker
  - (Season 5 Episode 7: "The Case of the Pathetic Patient") (1961) as Asa Cooperman
  - (Season 8 Episode 24: "The Case of the Careless Kitten") (1965) as Hotel Desk Clerk
- Mister Ed (1962–1965) (2 episodes)
  - (Season 2 Episode 21: "Bald Horse") (1962) as Dr. Evans
  - (Season 6 Episode 6: "Anybody Got a Zebra?") (1965) as Zoo Attendant
- Hazel (1963) (Season 2 Episode 22: "Hazel's Day Off") as Cyrano
- The Twilight Zone (1963–1964) (2 episodes)
  - (Season 4 Episode 5: "Mute") (1963) as Tom Poulter
  - (Season 5 Episode 32: "Mr. Garrity and the Graves") (1964) as Lapham
- The Fugitive (1964) (Season 1 Episode 22: "Angels Travel on Lonely Roads: Part 1") as Hobo
- Bewitched (1964)
- Honey West (1965) (Season 1 Episode 12: "A Million Bucks in Anybody's Language") as Wiley
- Petticoat Junction (1965–1970) (2 episodes)
  - (Season 2 Episode 31: "The Chicken Killer") (1965) as Hinky Mittenfloss
  - (Season 7 Episode 23: "Last Train to Pixley") (1970) as Mr. Benton
- The F.B.I. (1966) (Season 1 Episode 18: "The Sacrifice") as Bum
- Daniel Boone (1966-1968) (2 episodes)
  - (Season 3 Episode 4: "Grizzly") (1966) as Mr. Stubbs
  - (Season 4 Episode 15: "The Scrimshaw Ivory Chart") (1968) as Jud
- Green Acres (1966–1969) (3 episodes)
  - (Season 2 Episode 2: "Water, Water Everywhere") (1966) as Willie
  - (Season 3 Episode 15: "No Trespassing") (1967) as Ira Hatch
  - (Season 4 Episode 25: "The Milk Maker") (1969) as Luke Needlinger
- The Jerry Lewis Show (1967)
- Green Hornet (1967) (Season 1 Episode 20: "Ace in the Hole") as Gus
- The Girl from U.N.C.L.E. (1967) (Season 1 Episode 22: "The Furnace Flats Affair") as Mesquite Swede
- The Mothers-in-Law (1967) (Season 1 Episode 9: "How Do You Moonlight a Meatball?") as Dean Roberts
- The Virginian (1967) (Season 6 Episode 13: "Execution at Triste") as Storekeeper
- Batman (1968) (Season 3 Episode 18: "Louie's Lethal Lilac Time") as Gus
- Get Smart (1968) (Season 3 Episode 22: "Spy, Spy, Birdie") as A.J. Pfister
- Land of the Giants (1968) (Season 1 Episode 2: "Ghost Town") as Akman
- The Wild Wild West (1968) (Season 4 Episode 12: "The Night of Miguelito's Revenge") as Proprietor
- The Beverly Hillbillies (1968–1969) (6 episodes) as Homer Cratchit
  - (Season 7 Episode 9: "Bonnie, Flatt, and Scruggs") (1968)
  - (Season 7 Episode 14: "Christmas in Hooterville") (1968)
  - (Season 7 Episode 15: "Drysdale and Friend") (1969)
  - (Season 7 Episode 19: "Jed Clampett Enterprises") (1969)
  - (Season 7 Episode 21: "The Hired Gun") (1969)
  - (Season 7 Episode 22: "The Happy Bank") (1969)
- Love American Style (1970) (Season 1 Episode 16: segment "Love and Those Poor Crusaders' Wives") as Wharton
- Mission: Impossible (1971) (Season 5 Episode 16: "The Missile") as Dailey

== Commercial appearances ==
- Mandom, Japanese Perfume Commercial (1976) as Hotel Doorman
