= Betrayed Women =

- Directed by: Edward L. Cahn
- Screenplay by: Steve Fisher
- Story by: Paul Leslie Peil
- Produced by: William F. Broidy
- Starring: Carole Mathews; Beverly Michaels; Peggy Knudsen; Tom Drake; Sara Haden; John Dierkes; Esther Dale
- Cinematography: John J. Martin
- Edited by: Chandler House
- Music by: Edward J. Kay
- Production company: William F. Broidy Productions
- Distributed by: Allied Artists Pictures
- Release date: July 17, 1955
- Running time: 70 minutes
- Country: United States
- Language: English

Betrayed Women is a 1955 American crime film directed by Edward L. Cahn and written by Steve Fisher. The film stars Carole Mathews, Beverly Michaels, Peggy Knudsen, Tom Drake, Sara Haden, John Dierkes and Esther Dale. The film was released on July 17, 1955, by Allied Artists Pictures.

== Cast ==
- Carole Mathews as Kate Morrison
- Beverly Michaels as Honey Blake
- Peggy Knudsen as Nora Collins
- Tom Drake as Jeff Darrow
- Sara Haden as Darcy
- John Dierkes as Cletus Ballard
- Esther Dale as Mrs. Ballard
- Paul Savage as Baby Face
- Darlene Fields as Mrs. Mabry
- John Damler as Joe Mabry
- G. Pat Collins as Hostage Guard
- Burt Wenland as Guard
- Pete Kellett as Guard
