= Crashout =

1955 film by Lewis R. Foster

- Theatrical release poster
- Directed by: Lewis R. Foster
- Screenplay by: Hal E. Chester; Lewis R. Foster
- Produced by: Hal E. Chester
- Starring: William Bendix; Arthur Kennedy; Luther Adler; William Talman; Gene Evans; Marshall Thompson; Beverly Michaels
- Cinematography: Russell Metty
- Edited by: Robert Swink
- Music by: Leith Stevens
- Production company: Standard Productions
- Distributed by: Filmakers Releasing Organization
- Release dates: March 1, 1955 (United States); July 8, 1955 (New York City)
- Running time: 89 minutes
- Country: United States
- Language: English

Crashout is a 1955 American film noir crime film directed by Lewis R. Foster and starring William Bendix, Arthur Kennedy, Luther Adler, William Talman, Gene Evans, Marshall Thompson, and Beverly Michaels.

== Plot ==
Convict Van Duff is the sadistic leader of a large-scale prison break. The breakout succeeds with many casualties, as the six survivors hide out in a forgotten mine working near the prison. Amongst the six survivors are a wounded Van Duff, reverend-turned-religious fanatic Luther "Swanee" Remsen, hardened killers Pete Mendoza and "Monk" Collins, naive youngster Billy Lang, and greedy embezzler Joe Quinn- the only criminal of the lot to not be a murderer. Because the wounded Van Duff is too weak to travel on his own, he offers to split with the men the money he hid from his last bank robbery if they help him get to where he stashed the loot, which they agree to.

Once the coast is clear they then set out on a long, dangerous journey to the mountaintop where the loot is hidden. The convicts take by foot, car, train and truck in an attempt to get to the money. On the journey, the doomed prisoners interact with many locals including a farm woman, a doctor kidnapped by the gang to save Van Duff's life, and a young woman on a train. Billy Lang is prepared to run off with the girl on the train until he hears the radio blaring his description and realizes he can't drag her into his criminal lifestyle.

As they near their goal in freezing weather, the other survivors are whittled down through their own self-destructive actions and encounters with the law: Mendoza is shot by a motorcycle cop following a robbery, and Monk is set on fire by a man the gang had beaten up earlier. Swanee soon goes insane, killing Billy Lang, and Van Duff has to kill him in self-defense, further narrowing down the gang to Van Duff and Quinn by the time they get to the mountaintop.

Once the money is recovered, Van Duff turns on Quinn and leaves him for dead. Quinn finds Van Duff frozen to death the next morning, still holding the money. Quinn, the only survivor of the six, gives himself up to an approaching search party and is grateful for their presence.

== Cast ==
- William Bendix as Van Morgan Duff
- Arthur Kennedy as Joe Quinn
- Luther Adler as Pete Mendoza
- William Talman as Luther Remsen
- Gene Evans as Maynard "Monk" Collins
- Marshall Thompson as Billy Lang
- Beverly Michaels as Alice Mosher
- Gloria Talbott as Girl in Train
- Adam Williams as Fred Summerfield
- Percy Helton as Doctor Louis Barnes
- Melinda Markey as Girl in Bar
- Christopher Olsen as Timmy Mosher (as Chris Olsen)
- Adele St. Mauer as Mrs. Mosher
- Edward Clark as Conductor
- Tom Dugan as Ed, the Bartender

== See also ==
- List of American films of 1955
