= Leonovich =

Leonovich (Russian: Леонович), Leanovich (Belarusian: Леановіч) or Leonovych (Ukrainian: Леонович) is a patronymic surname of East Slavic origin. Polish equivalent: Leonowicz, Lithuanian: Leonavičius, Leanavičius. It should not be confused with the patronymic component of the East Slavic name. Notable people with the surname include:

- Kirill Leonovich (born 1998), Belarusian footba
- Stanislav Leonovich (1958–2022), Russian pair skater and coach

== See also ==
- 21397 Leontovich (1998 FJ54), a main-belt asteroid
- Leontovich
