= Voldemar Vetluguin =

Russian-American writer (1897–1953)

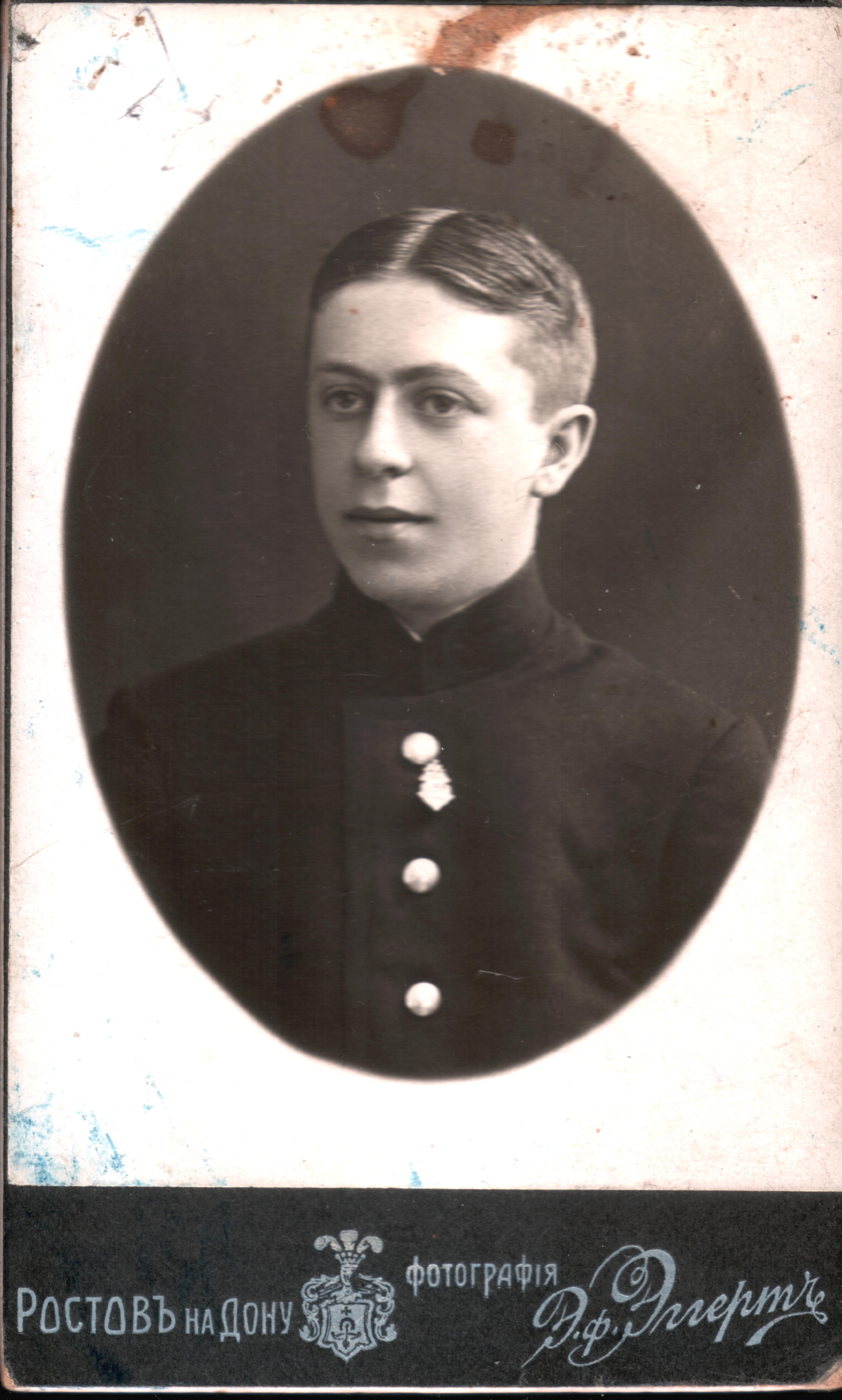
- Vetluguin in 1914
- Born: Vladimir Ilyich Ryndzyun; March 8, 1897; Rostov-on-Don, Russia
- Died: May 15, 1953 (aged 56); New York City, U.S.
- Other names: Novyy; Delta; D. Denisov; A. Vetlugin; Vladimir Vetlugin; Frederick Van Ryn; Voldemar R. Vetluguin
- Occupations: Writer; journalist; film producer
- Years active: 1917–1950
- Spouse: Beverly Michaels (m. 1949; div. 1952)

Voldemar Ryndzune Vetluguin (né Ryndzyun; (Note: Russian: Владимир Ильич Рындзюн, romanized: Vladimir Ilyich Ryndzyun) March 8, 1897 – May 15, 1953) was a Russian-American writer, publicist, journalist and film producer.

== Early life ==
Vetluguin was born in 1897 in Rostov-on-Don, Russia, into a Jewish family. His father, Ilya Galileevich Ryndzyun, was the owner of a local hydrotherapy facility, and his mother, Mathilda Borisovna Raivich, was a housewife. Ilya Ryndzyun was the founder of the first hydrotherapy clinic in Russia and wrote two textbooks on hydrotherapy. Vetluguin was one of four children in the family; his three sisters were Nina, Glafira and Lyudmila Ryndzyun. Nina would later become a famous Soviet sculptor under her married name of Nina Niss-Goldman.

In 1906 he entered and in 1914 graduated with a gold medal from the Rostov-on-Don Gymnasium. Shortly before entering the University of Moscow in 1914, at the insistence of his father, he was baptized as an Orthodox Christian. He was enrolled in the natural sciences department of the physics and mathematics faculty, but during the semester he was transferred to the medical faculty, and in 1915 he submitted a request to transfer to the history and philology faculty, but was later reinstated in the medical faculty, since his parents refused to financially support him otherwise. Sources are uncertain as to whether Vetluguin ever graduated; some claim he ended up graduating from the faculty of law of the University of Moscow, whereas others report that there is no document evidence of Vetluguin graduating from university.

== Literary career in Russia ==
In 1917 he made his debut in the Rostov regional press under his birth name, Vladimir Ryndzyun, as a journalist.

In 1918, while collaborating with White newspapers in the south of Russia, he began using the pseudonym A. Vetlugin. He worked for the Moscow-based newspaper Life together with Don Aminado, who facilitated the journalist's move to Paris, and published him in his Parisian children's magazine Green Stick.

In 1919, he was in charge of the Rostov volunteer newspaper Life. In 1920, he fled from Rostov through Novorossiysk and Armavir to Batum, then to Baku, Tfilis and Crimea. In June, he emigrated to Constantinople, then moved to Paris. He worked in the white émigré press. He published the books Adventurers of the Civil War (Paris, 1921) and Third Russia (Paris, 1922). He worked for the newspaper Common Cause, irregularly published by V. L. Burtsev. In the spring of 1922 he moved to Berlin and began working at the newspaper Nakanune, financed by the Soviet authorities. Vetluguin published a book of essays, Heroes and Imaginary Portraits, the book The Afterlives, and the novel Notes of a Scoundrel: Moments in the Life of Yuri Bystritsky (Berlin, 1922).

== Life in the United States ==
In the autumn of 1922, Vetluguin accompanied Sergei Yesenin and Isadora Duncan to America as a secretary and translator and remained in the US, where he worked as Isadora Duncan's manager. He acquired American citizenship, changing his name to Voldemar Ryndzune Vetluguin and altering his birth year to 1894. In 1923, he collaborated with the newspaper Russian Voice at the invitation of David Burliuk. In 1927, Vetluguin was engaged in the advertising business. It was Vetluguin who was the popularizer in America of the cover girl, by the placement of photographs of attractive girls on the covers of magazines. He worked for the magazines Esquire and Liberty under the pseudonym Frederick Van Ryn.

From 1933 to 1943, Vetluguin (as Van Ryn) was an assistant editor at the popular women's magazine Redbook, after which he accepted the invitation of Louis B. Mayer, co-owner of the Metro-Goldwyn-Mayer studios, to become his assistant and also head of the script department at MGM.

In 1948, Vetluguin received the position of producer at MGM. In 1949, he produced his first film, East Side, West Side, starring Barbara Stanwyck and James Mason. In 1950, Vetluguin produced the film A Life of Her Own with Lana Turner and Ray Milland.

He continued his journalistic work all throughout his career in the film industry, publishing articles in various journals as Frederick Van Ryn. His last article was published in Esquire in February 1953, shortly before his death.

== Personal life ==
In 1949, Vetluguin married 22-year-old B-movie actress Beverly Michaels. They divorced in 1952.

Voldemar Ryndzune Vetluguin died in 1953 in New York City, at the age of 56.
