= Women Without Men (1956 film) =

1956 British film by Elmo Williams

- U.S. poster
- Directed by: Elmo Williams
- Screenplay by: Val Guest; Richard Landau
- Based on: a story by Richard Landau
- Produced by: Anthony Hinds
- Starring: Beverly Michaels; Joan Rice; Thora Hird; Hermione Baddeley
- Cinematography: Walter J. Harvey; William Whitley
- Edited by: James Needs
- Music by: Leonard Salzedo; John Hollingsworth
- Production company: Hammer Film Productions
- Distributed by: Exclusive Films (U.K.); Associated Film Releasing Corporation (U.S.)
- Release dates: 14 June 1956; (UK trade show); 1956 (US)
- Running time: 73 minutes (UK); 71 minutes (US)
- Country: United Kingdom
- Language: English

Women Without Men (released in US as Blonde Bait) is a 1956 British second feature drama film directed by Elmo Williams and starring Beverly Michaels, Joan Rice, Thora Hird and Hermione Baddeley. A woman escapes from prison to keep a date with her boyfriend.

== Plot ==
Angie Booth is imprisoned following an assault committed in self-defence, and she escapes along with two other prisoners, Granny and Marguerite, to keep a date with her would-be fiancé Nick, who has been out of the country and unaware of her plight. In order to make the meeting, Nick discharges himself from hospital. Meanwhile Marguerite struggles to prevent her baby from being sent to an orphanage.

== The re-edited American version ==
For its 1956 U.S. release, the film was retitled Blonde Bait and was substantially re-edited, with all-new scenes filmed by the American distributors (with additional American actors, with Jim Davis replacing Paul Carpenter as Nick, and notable character and plot changes, such as turning the heroine into a gangster's gun moll, for whom the prison break is engineered by the police in hopes she will lead them to her much-wanted fugitive boyfriend. Other new actors added to the American version were Richard Travis, Harry Lauter and Paul Cavanagh. Beverly Michaels also appeared in the American film version in several new scenes, including the opening and closing.

== Cast ==
- Beverly Michaels as Angie Booth
- Joan Rice as Cleo
- Thora Hird as Granny
- Avril Angers as Bessie
- Paul Carpenter as Nick Randall (UK version only)
- Jim Davis as Nick Randall (US version only)
- Hermione Baddeley as Grace
- Bill Shine as reveller
- Gordon Jackson as Percy
- Valerie White as Governor
- Eugene Deckers as Pierre
- April Olrich as Marguerite
- Ralph Michael as Julian
- Betty Cooper as Evans
- Sheila Burrell as Babs
- Michael Golden as bargee
- John Welsh as chaplain
- Maurice Kaufmann as Daniels
- David Lodge as Patrick, prison officer

Added to the US version:

- Harry Lauter as Mark
- Richard Travis as Kent Foster
- Paul Cavanaugh as Inspector
- Jim Davis as Nick Randall

== Critical reception ==
Monthly Film Bulletin said "A stereotyped women's prison drama, following a predictable course in incident and characterisation. The actual escape seems somewhat arbitrarily contrived, relying more on the stupidity of the guards and police than the ingenuity of the participants, but on its modest level, the plot maintains an agreeable balance between thrills and humour. The players assume their familiar roles with ease, and there is a tireless performance by Thora Hird."

Sky Movies wrote, "Hammer Films, just before their success in the horror field, jumped on the band-wagon for women's prison films that had been rolling in Britain and America since the success of Caged in 1950. Beverly Michaels (sent to prison on the slimmest of pretexts), Joan Rice, April Olrich and Hermione Baddely are among those looking grim, while Thora Hird makes the most of one of her best film roles as the indomitable Granny."

The Radio Times noted a "Second-feature British prison drama of no particular distinction, but deploying some humour and employing some interesting names – Thora Hird, Avril Angers – which up the entertainment quotient ... it's good for an idle rainy afternoon or 2am insomnia."

In British Sound Films: The Studio Years 1928–1959 David Quinlan rated the film as "average", writing: "Women's prison drama with welcome vein of humour; silly plot, lively performances."
