= Cover girl =

Woman featured on magazine covers

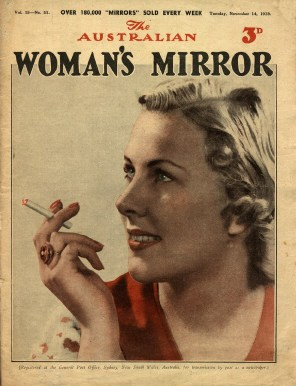
Australian magazine featuring a cover girl

A cover girl is a woman whose photograph is used for the front cover of magazines. She may be a model, celebrity or entertainer. The term would generally not be used to describe a person making a single, casual appearance on the cover of a magazine. The term first appeared in English in about 1899. Russian-American film producer Voldemar Vetluguin is credited with the popularization of the usage of cover girls in magazine covers. The term cover boy is occasionally used for men.

== Types of cover girl ==
Women are on the cover of the majority of general-interest magazines in the west for both men and women, with exceptions as discussed below.

Celebrities feature on the cover of magazines such as Redbook for women, or Gentlemen's Quarterly, Maxim or Esquire for men. The use of royalty or aristocracy is linked to the primary objective of recognition.

Some magazines for women feature an unknown model that represents the style of the magazine, such as Seventeen. A parallel to this trend is reflected in men's magazines such as Men's Fitness or Sports Illustrated.

An intermediate category is the use of a model or supermodel who is recognizable due to exposure in magazines or advertising, a strategy often adopted by Elle magazine.

In most cases, the objective is to maximize sales and differentiation, while also expressing the brand values of the title.

== Editorial approaches and the market-place ==
Editorial decisions concerning the positioning of the magazine in the market-place are a key influence on the portrayal of women on the cover.

In the 20th century, numerous women's magazines would feature royalty or aristocracy on their covers. In the 1980s and 1990s, Diana, Princess of Wales would be a popular cover choice—but usually for weeklies, usually shot by paparazzi, so strictly these were not "cover girl" images. However, there were exceptions where authorized portraits of royalty, such as Diana, Princess Beatrice of York and Queen Elizabeth II, were taken for Vogue, Tatler and Harper's Bazaar. Despite public complaints about exploitation in the 1990s, publishers have not shied away from using royalty when possible.

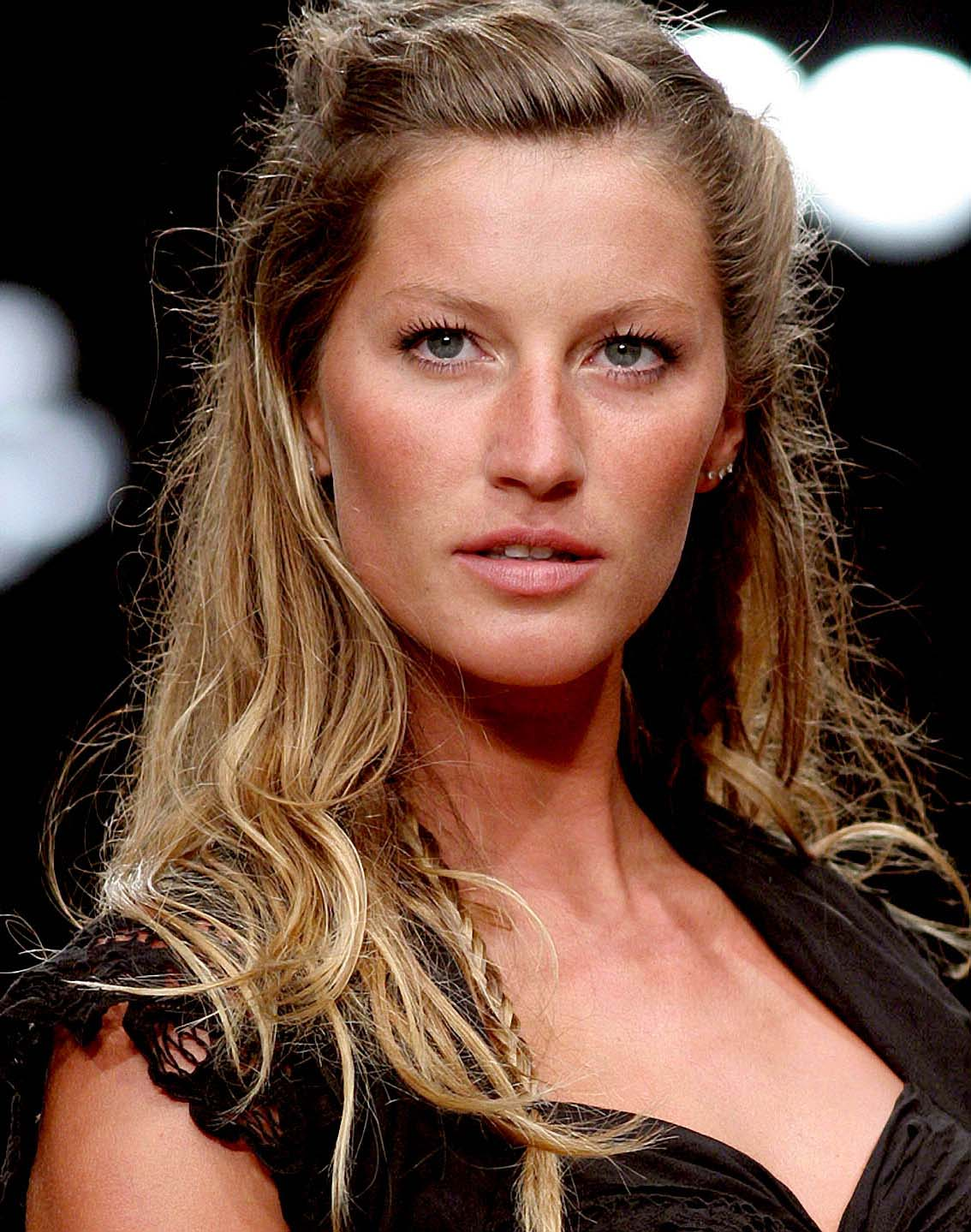
Supermodel Gisele Bündchen has frequently been featured on fashion magazine covers.

New men's style magazines founded in the 1980s, like Arena and Gentlemen's Quarterly rarely featured women on the cover, and where they did they were intended not to be sexually provocative, deliberately distancing the magazine from 'top shelf' soft core pornographic magazines. Notably Esquire's first edition featured a photograph of Brigitte Bardot that was over thirty years old. However, this trend changed during the 1990s, initially with Loaded in the UK, followed by FHM. GQ’s UK edition was eventually forced to follow suit.

Later Peter Howarth, UK editor of Esquire famously removed semi-naked women from the covers in a move to once again differentiate the magazine from the competition. The result was a drop in sales but an increase in advertising revenue, as the magazine was able to attract advertisers for more high-end products than before.

The rise of celebrity culture in the late 1980s and early 1990s has seen to the appearance of more actresses on magazine covers, especially among fashion magazines. This may be due to a convergence in the mass media between traditional models and actresses: models gained a greater profile in the 1980s, largely through the "supermodels", and became celebrities in their own right. Actresses, meanwhile, saw appearances in fashion magazines as beneficial to their careers and overall profiles. In addition, numerous models made the move into acting. Finally, there is the issue of sales: a recognizable face will, theoretically, shift more magazines.

The choice of model depends in some part on one's potential recognition in the market-place in which the title is sold. For example, Lucire Romania saw its sales and profile increase after using a local cover girl, Monica Gabor, rather than those photographed by the "master edition" in New Zealand.

While familiarity is a desirable trait for magazine covers—hence the top models and celebrities can charge large amounts for a photographic shoot—there is always the problem of overexposure and dilution of one's image. If, for instance, the majority of covers featured a small handful of celebrities, then the differentiation becomes minimal (e.g. in certain months in 2005, Paris Hilton featured on numerous covers), and there would, in theory, be a tendency to promote lesser known faces.

In the 2000s, some have predicted the demise of the actress or celebrity from fashion magazine covers, citing overexposure and growing cynicism. However, with the success of magazines such as InStyle, which uses celebrity covers, there is little evidence that the predictions are being realized in the middle of the decade.

== Image editing ==
Image editing is common practice for photographs used in advertising and publicity, and cover images are no exception. Image editing is an ongoing process of styling and selection, which invites debate on issues related to the representation of women. Arguably, advertising and cover images can help perpetuate an unattainable ideal of beauty, sometimes aided through methods of retouching to remove skin blemishes and shadows under the eyes, smooth out skin texture, widen pupils, or suggest an hourglass figure.

A contrary viewpoint has been put forward by some in the trade, saying that a retouched photograph is actually more representative of the subject. The theory is that when one is in the presence of the person, one does not notice the blemishes. Retouching, therefore, restores the "energy" of the subject.

== Cover girl style through the ages ==
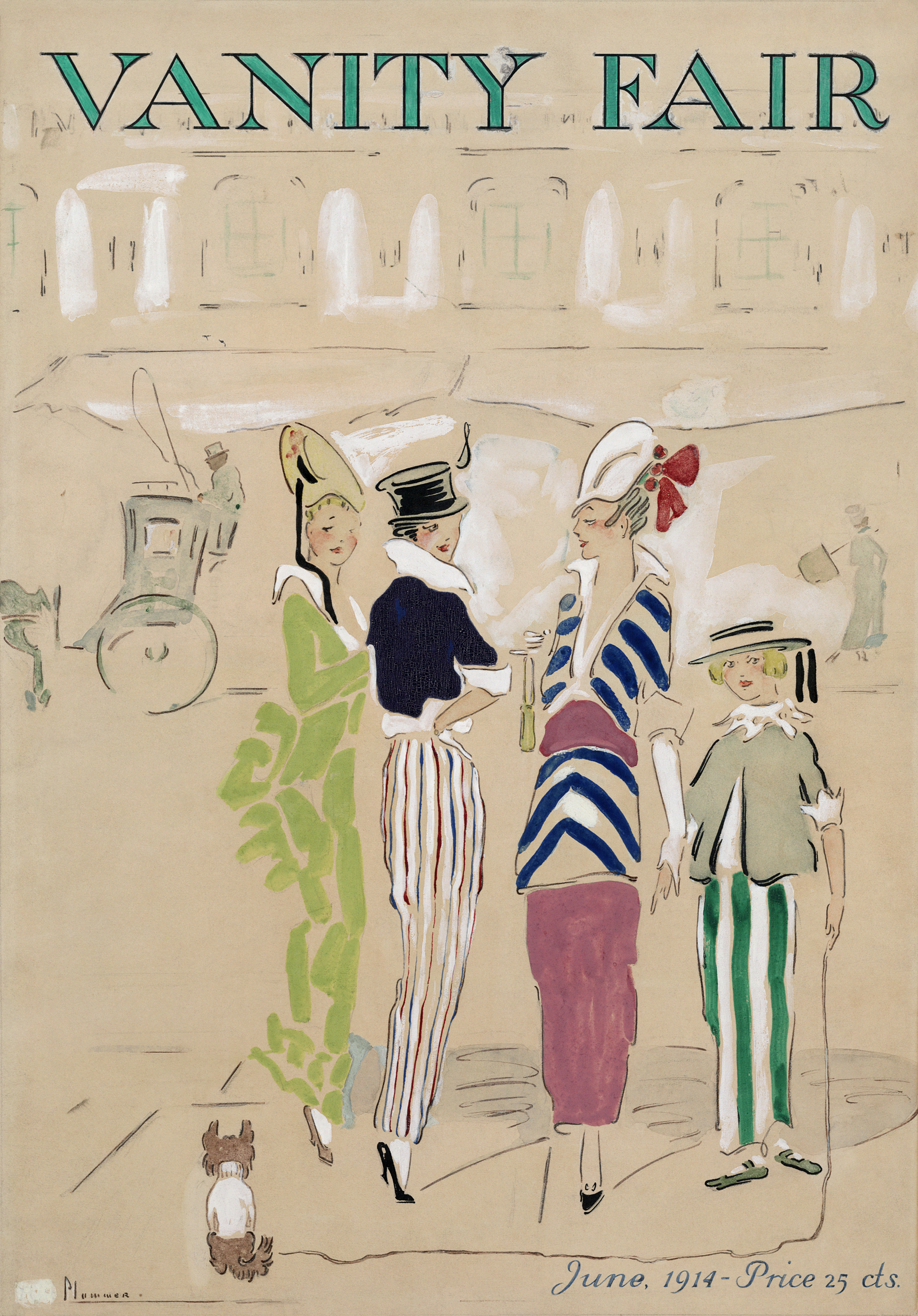
Cover-girls - Vanity Fair (1914)

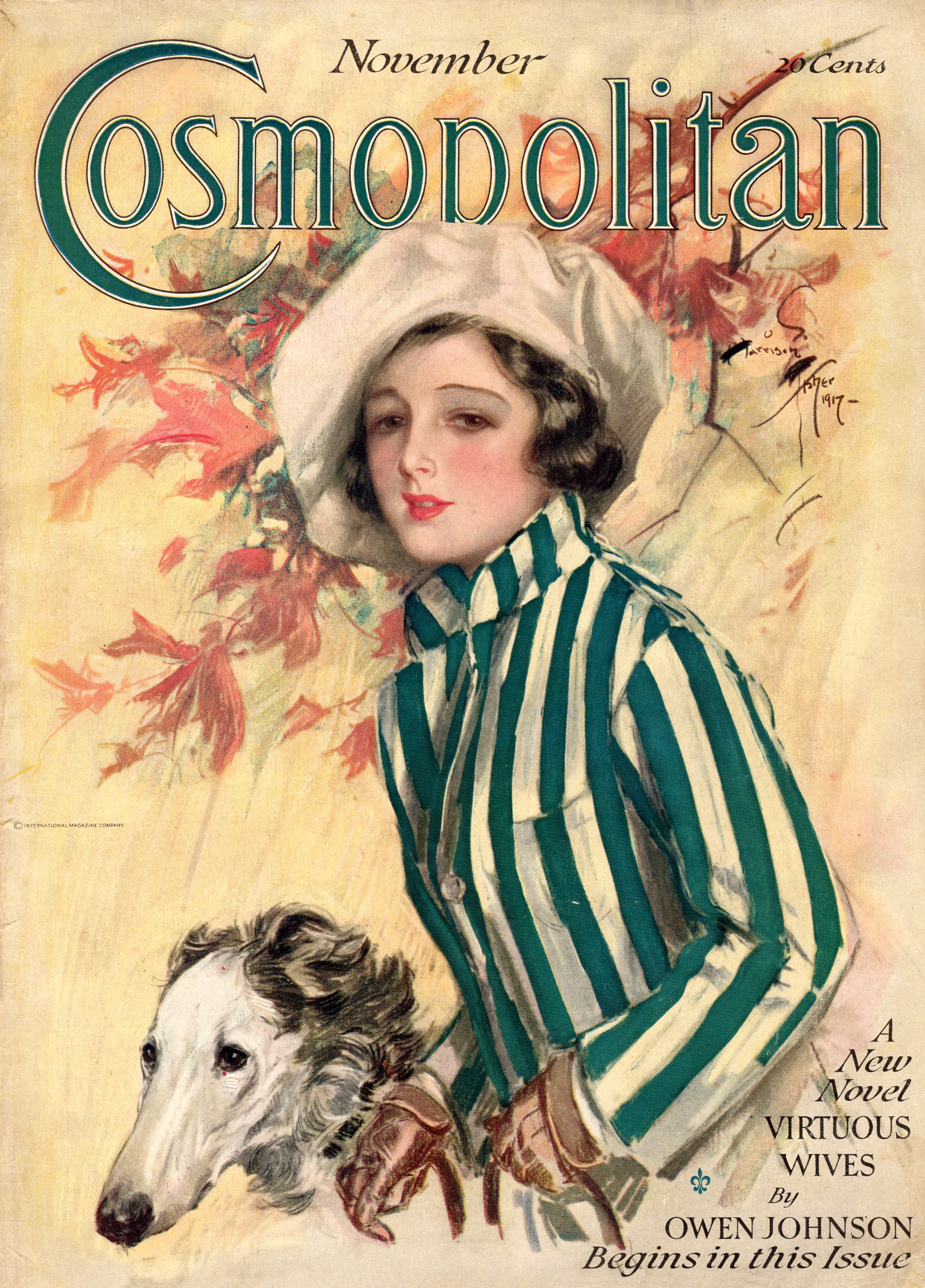
Cover girl - Cosmopolitan (1917)

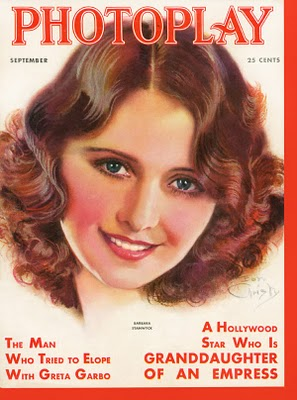
Barbara Stanwyck - Photoplay (Sept.1931)

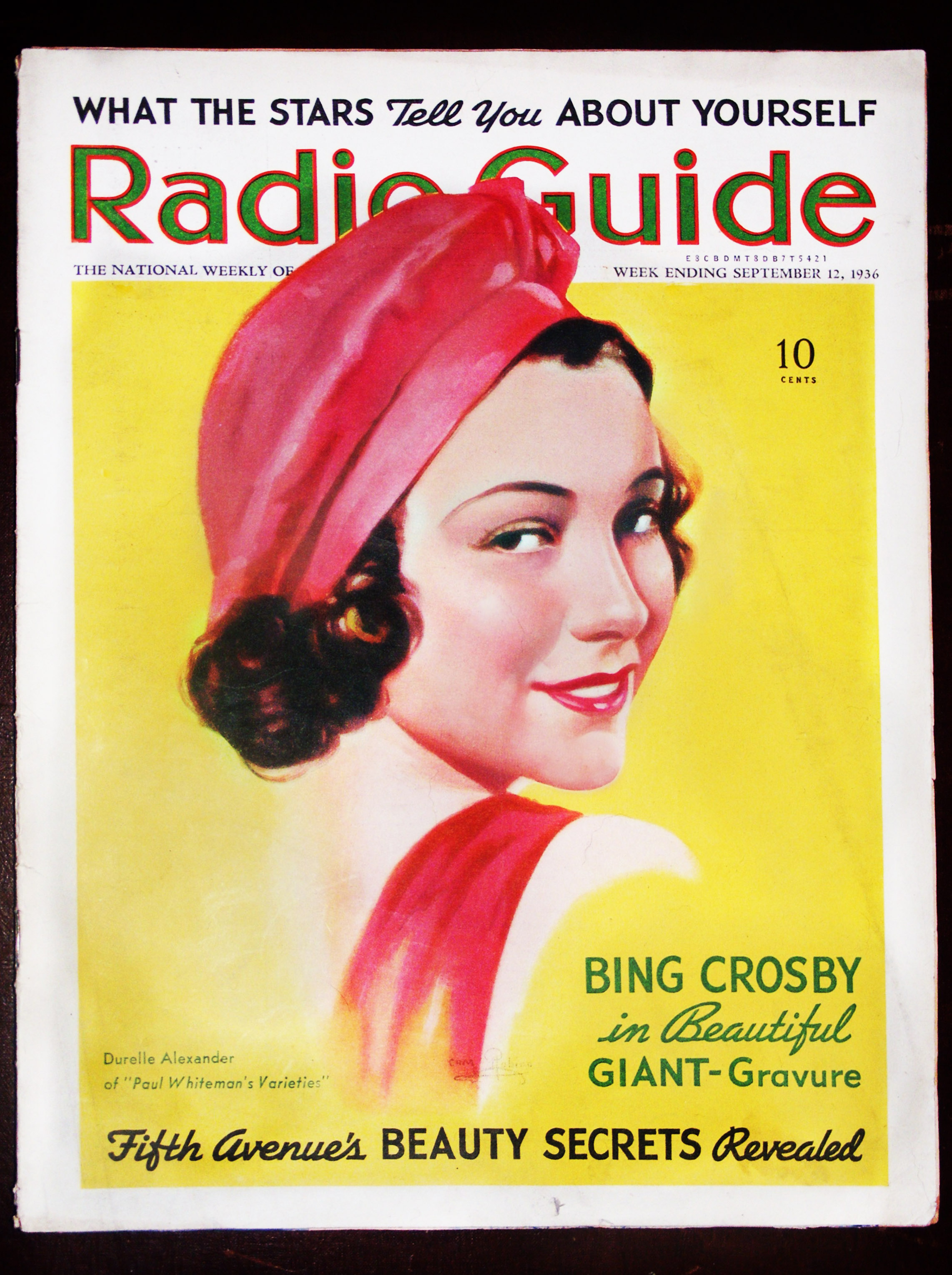
Durelle Alexander - Radio Guide, (1936)

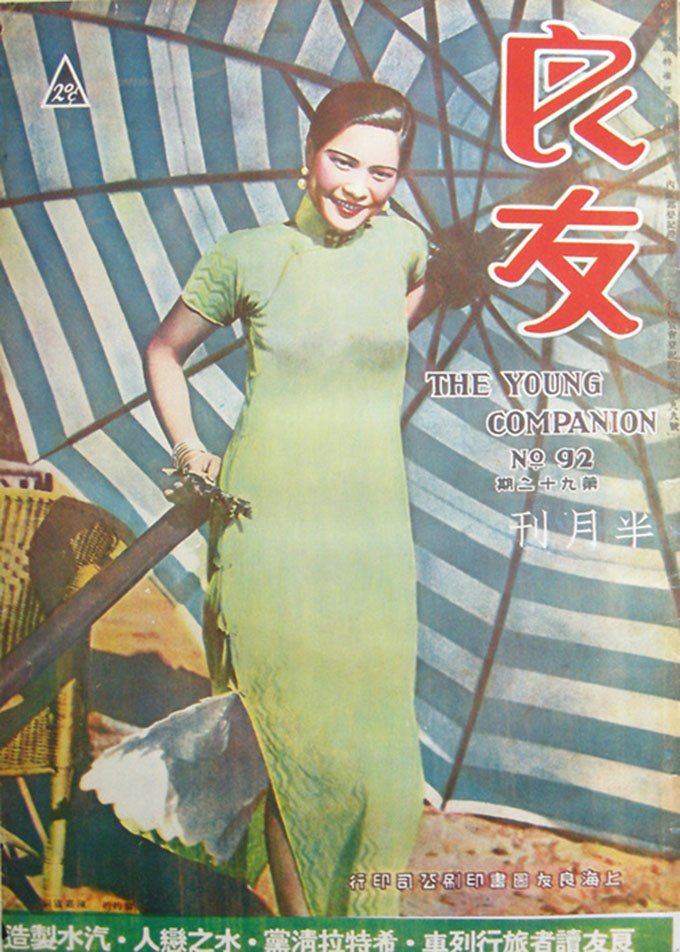
Li Zhuozhuo - Chinese magazine The Young Companion (1934)

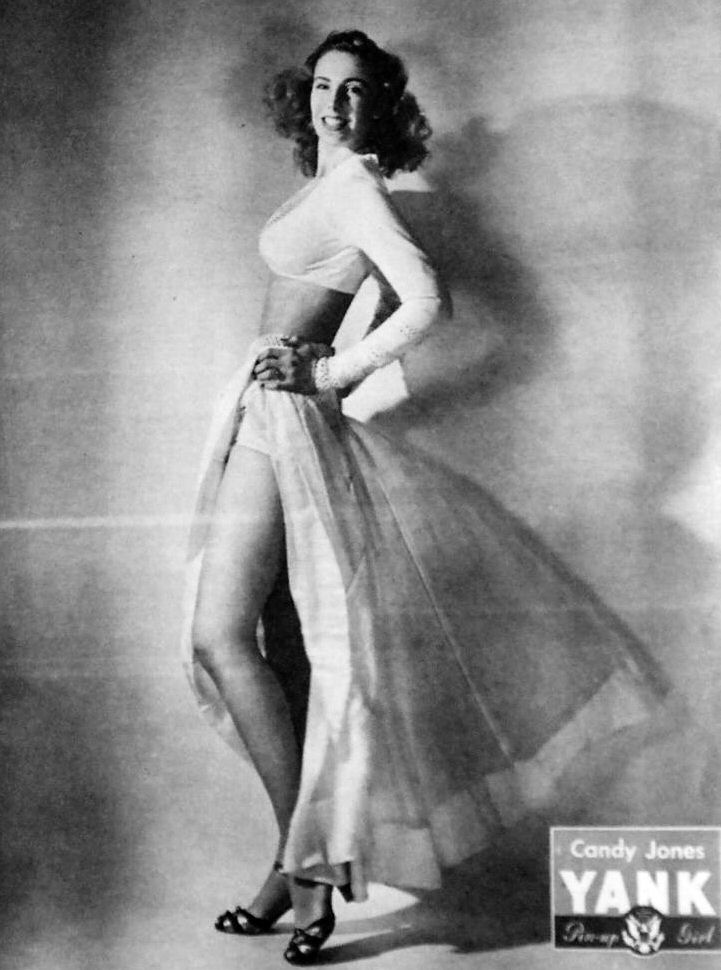
Candy Jones, pin-up girl of Yank, the Army Weekly, (1944)

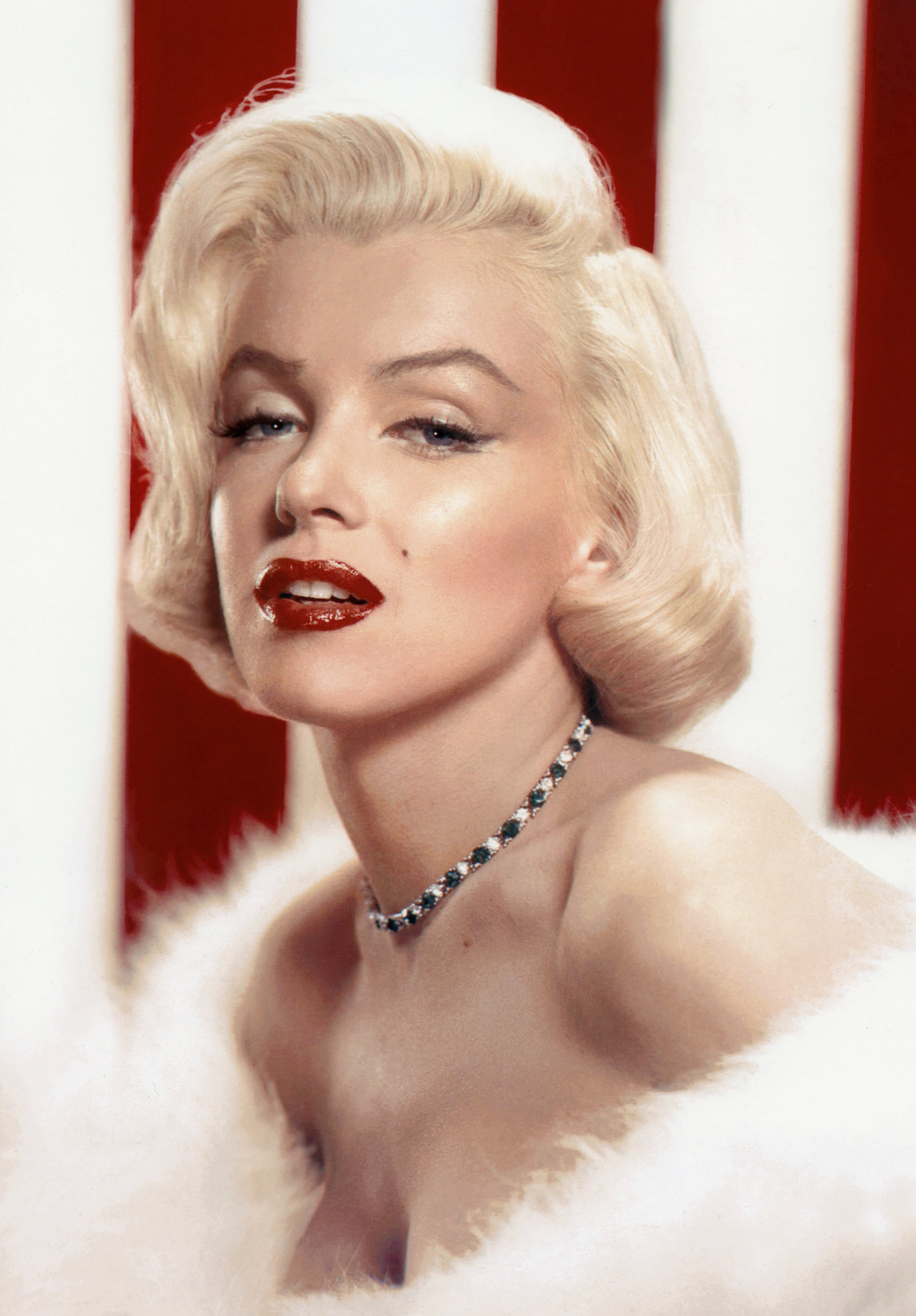
Marilyn Monroe, Photoplay (December 1953)

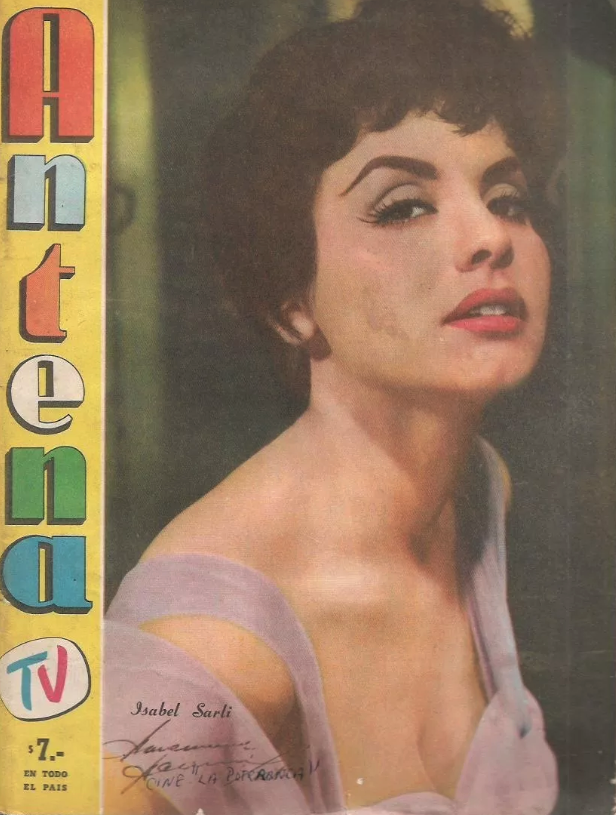
Isabel Sarli - Antena TV (September 1960)

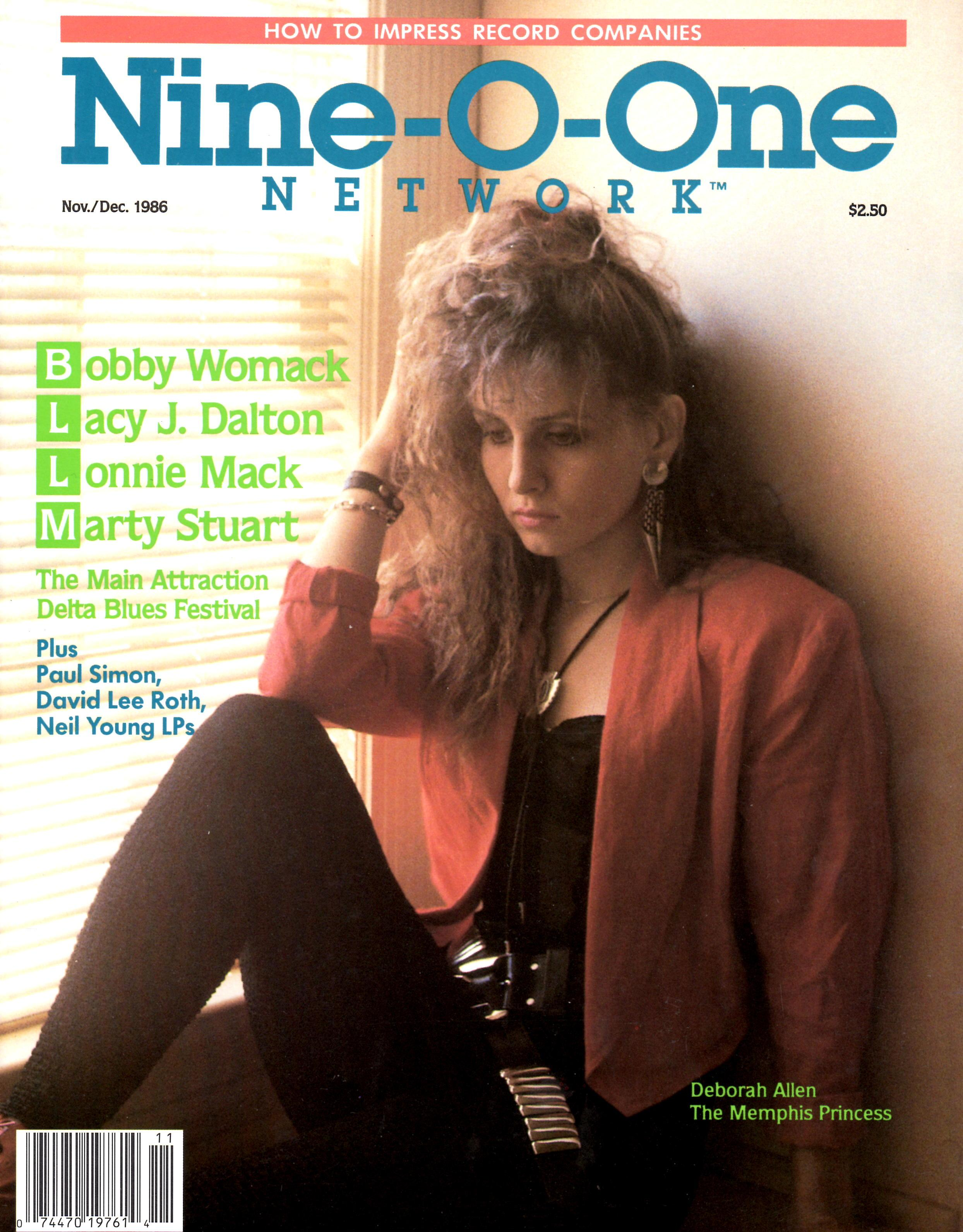
Deborah Allen - Nine-O-One Network Magazine (Nov. 1986)

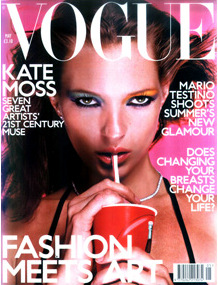
Kate Moss, the British edition of Vogue (May, 2000)

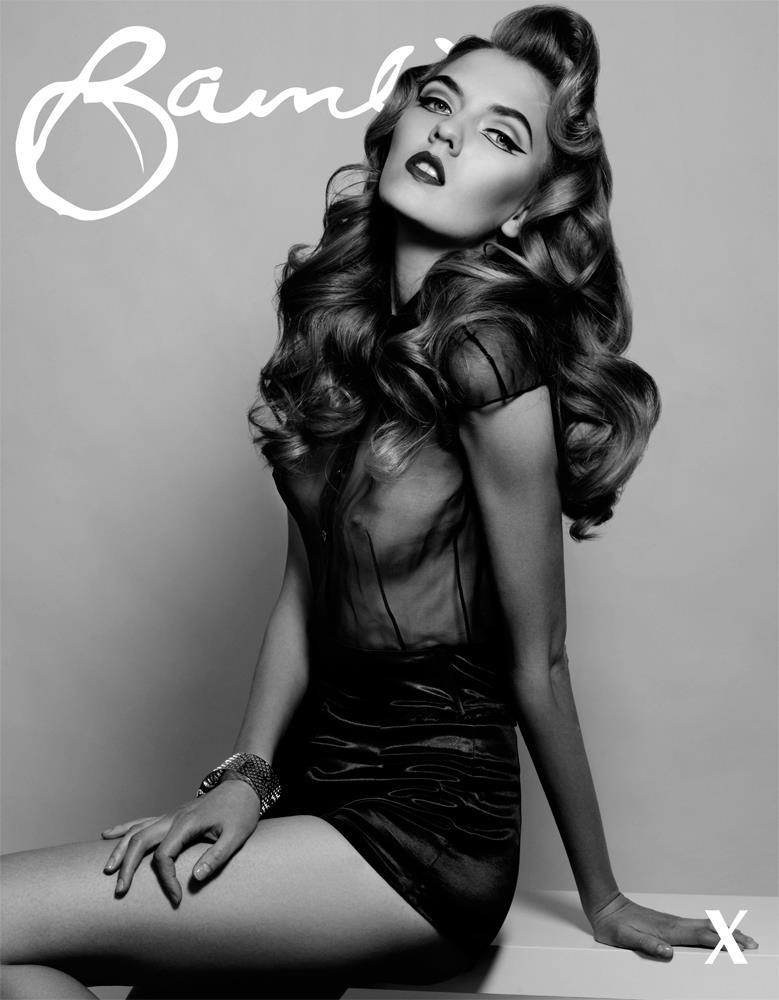
Toma Barkova - Bambi magazine (about 2010) (vintage 1940s pin-up style)

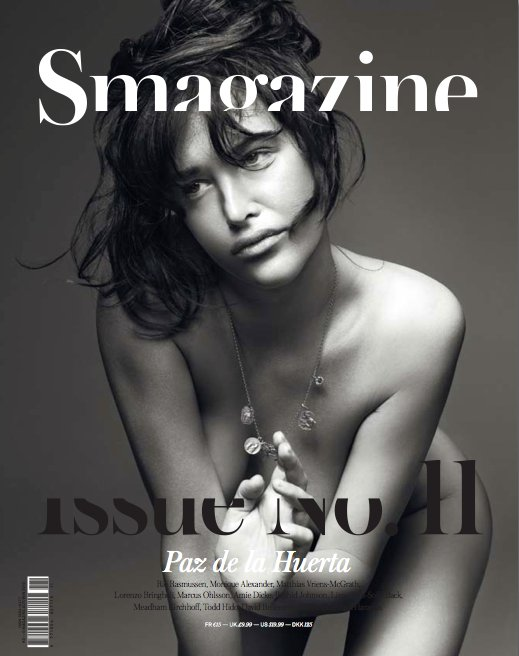
Paz de la Huerta - S Magazine (issue 11 - 2010).

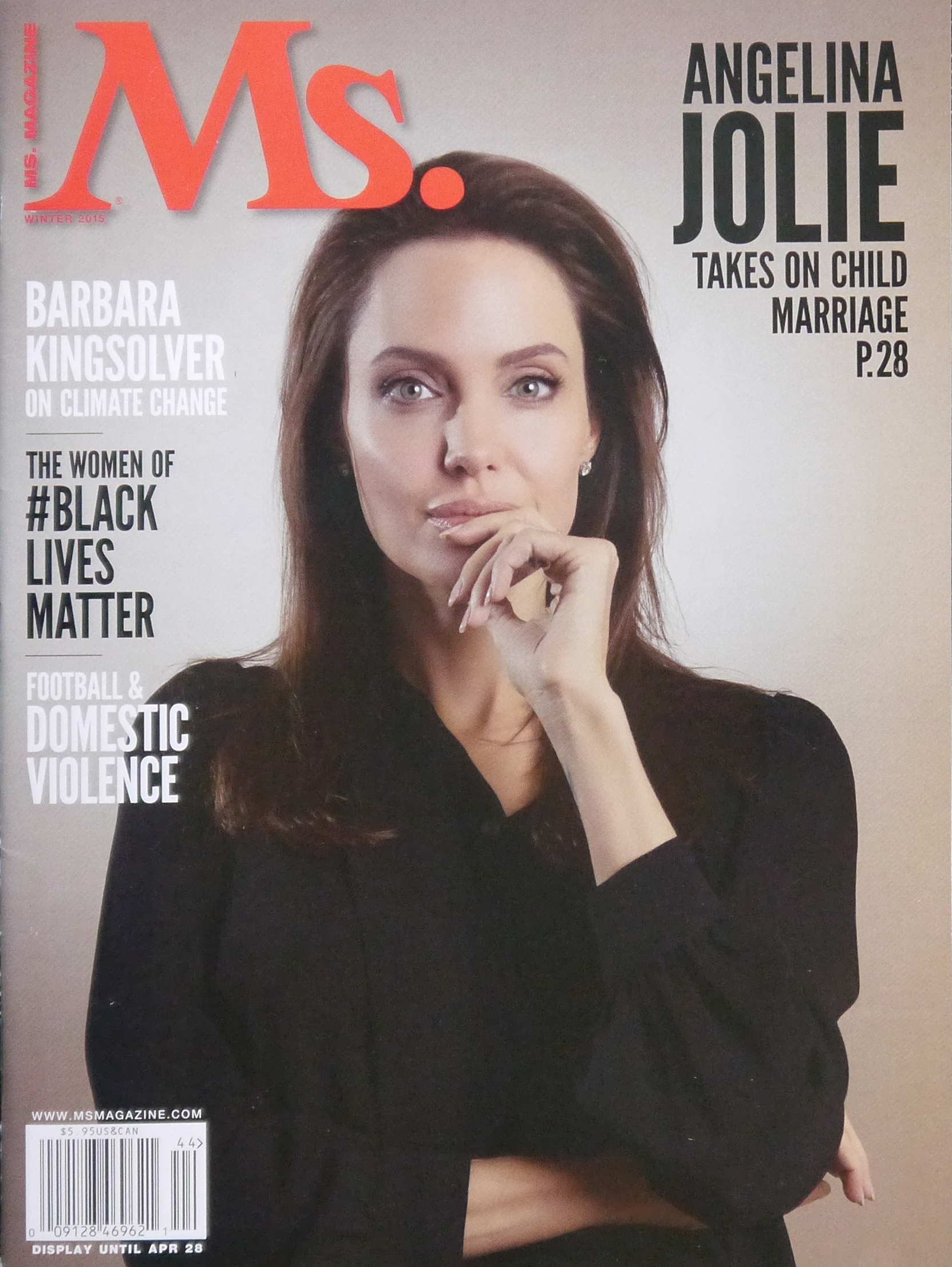
Angelina Jolie - Ms. Magazine (2015)

== See also ==
- Airbrush
- Retouching
- Photography
- Photoshopping
