= Beverly Michaels =

American model and film actress (1927–2007)

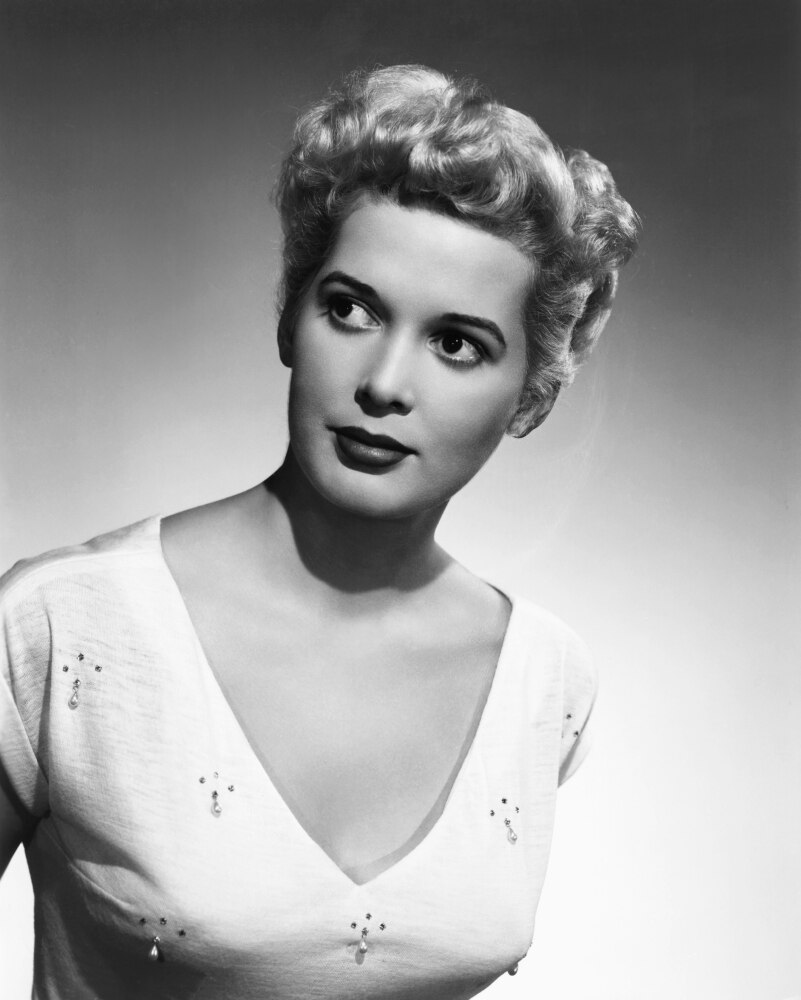
- Michaels in 1952
- Born: Beverly Eileen Michaels; December 29, 1927; The Bronx, U.S.
- Died: June 9, 2007 (aged 79); Los Angeles, California, U.S.
- Other name: Beverley Michaels
- Occupations: Actress; model
- Years active: 1948–1956
- Spouses: Voldemar Vetluguin (m. 1949; div. 1952) Russell Rouse (m. 1955; died 1987)
- Children: 2, including Christopher Rouse

Beverly Eileen Michaels (December 29, 1927 – June 9, 2007) was an American B-movie actress and cheesecake model of the 1950s.

== Career ==
Michaels began her career at the age of 16 in 1944 as a showgirl at Billy Rose's Diamond Horseshoe Nightclub in New York. Her stage debut, also at age 16, was in the play Glad to See You which ran in Philadelphia and Boston from November 1944 to January 1945. After that show closed, she was a dancer in Havana for about a year. Returning to the US, she worked as a chorus girl on Broadway.

Arriving in Hollywood in 1948 at the age of 21 and standing at least 5 feet 9 inches tall (some sources cited 6 feet), Michaels quickly found modeling jobs, in which she was initially credited as "Beverley Michaels." Under contract to MGM Studios, she made her first screen appearance in Mervyn LeRoy's East Side, West Side (February 1950), starring Barbara Stanwyck, Ava Gardner, James Mason and Van Heflin.

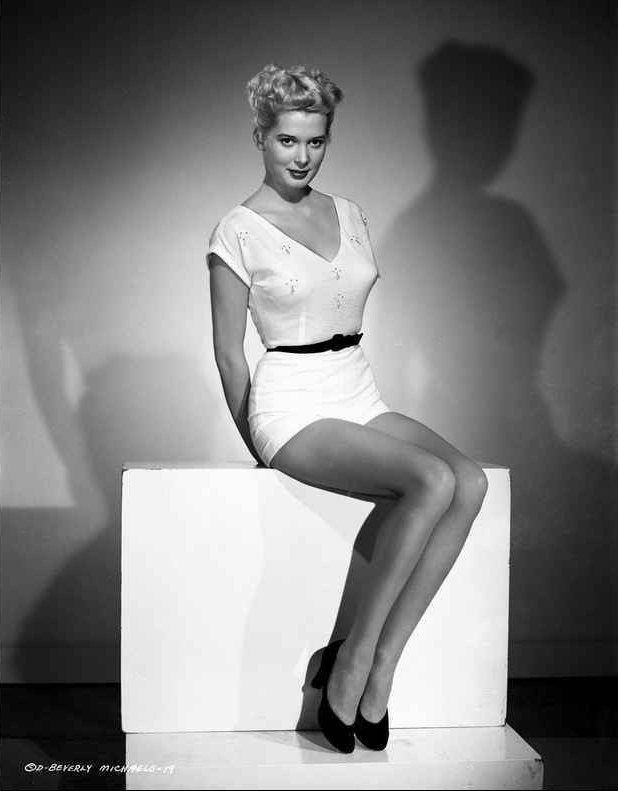
Beverly Michaels circa 1950

Michaels then appeared in two films by independent film director and producer Hugo Haas. The first, the 1951 film noir Pickup, was a surprise hit, albeit a secondary B feature, and launched Haas's career as a Hollywood director. It also had a large part in starting the cycle of bad girl movies of the 1950s, which usually starred blonde sexpots. The New York Times' film reviewer wrote: "Beverly Michaels, a comparative newcomer, is flashily attractive, hard and vulgar as his two-timing mate, but her histrionics are, like the cheap character she portrays, coarse and in need of polishing." Haas' follow-up release The Girl on the Bridge (1951) was his last picture with Michaels.

Michaels went on to win contracts with Columbia and, later, Universal Pictures. She also appeared in a Bowery Boys film No Holds Barred, released by low-budget studio Monogram Pictures in 1952.

In late 1952 Michaels toured Alaska for the USO, singing Christmas carols for the troops. At about this time, she met the director and screenwriter Russell Rouse, who later became her second husband. Rouse cast her in a starring role in his film noir Wicked Woman (1954). The Village Voice praised her performance as "wonderfully lurid," and included the movie in a list of the 25 most memorable cult films.

Later roles included the 1955 noir film Crashout, Hammer Films' Women Without Men (1956) and guest-starring roles in television shows.

In a 1954 newspaper interview, Michaels was questioned about her choice of racy roles:

"One of the penalties, she says, is that some people, especially the wolf type, can't forget it was just a movie. She has had, she says, to give several real-life brush-offs. However, Beverly says, they are things you have to accept. 'I get my share of wisecracks. But I ignore them. You have to. If you're going to play roles like I have, you have to expect to be a target for such remarks. I just pretend I don't hear them. If you're going to be supersensitive, you had better get out of the business...I always have hope that my next picture will make me a decent woman.'"

== Personal life ==
Michaels was one of six children of Denzil and Catherine Michaels (nee Chisholm). She attended Cathedral High School, where she played center on the girls' basketball team.

In 1949, she married MGM executive Voldemar Vetluguin, producer of her first film East Side, West Side. She was 20; he was in his 50s. They divorced in 1952.

In 1957, she married Russell Rouse, director and screenwriter of Wicked Woman and many other films. They had two sons. One, film editor Christopher Rouse, won an Oscar in editing for The Bourne Ultimatum in 2007.

In the 1980s, a cult following grew among fans of the "bad girl" 1950s melodrama genre. While this public interest centered mostly on Cleo Moore, Diana Dors and Mamie Van Doren, Michaels' contributions were duly noted, including a tribute to Wicked Woman written by Lily Tomlin in the short-lived magazine Movies. After her retirement, she made an appearance at a film noir festival to honor her deceased husband Russell Rouse during a screening of Wicked Woman.

== Final years and death ==
Michaels lived in Southern California until her death from a stroke at the age of 79.

== Filmography ==
Year	Film title	Role	Notes
1950	East Side, West Side	Felice Backett	MGM. Producer: first husband Voldemar Vetluguin
1950	Three Little Words	Shipboard Woman	MGM. Uncredited.
1951	Pickup	Betty	Columbia
1951	The Girl on the Bridge	Clara	Hugo Haas Productions
1952	The Marrying Kind	Blonde on Life Cover	Columbia
1952	No Holds Barred	Blonde at Party (uncredited)	Monogram Studios
1954	Wicked Woman	Billie Nash	Edward Small Productions. Director: second husband Russell Rouse
1955	Adventures of the Falcon	June Dennison	Episode: "The Wheel of Fortune"
1955	Crashout	Alice Mosher	Standard Productions
1955	Betrayed Women	Honey Blake	William F. Broidy Productions
1956	Alfred Hitchcock Presents	Goldie	Season 1 Episode 15: "The Big Switch"
1956	Cheyenne	Sheila Dembro	Episode: "The Storm Riders"
1956	Women Without Men (two versions filmed: UK & USA)	Angela Booth	Hammer Films. Alternate titles: Blonde Bait, Appointment at Midnight -She also starred in the U.S. release's alternate ending.
