= Leonavičius =

- Lithuanian surname
- m.: Leonavičius
- f.: (unmarried): Leonavičienė
- f.: (married): Leonavičiūtė
- Related names: Leonovich/Leonowicz

Leonavičius is a Lithuanian surname, a Lithuanian form of the Slavic surname Leonovich/Leonowicz. Notable people with the surname include:

- Gintaras Leonavičius, Lithuanian basketball player
- Marius Leonavičius, Lithuanian basketball coach
- Šarūnas Leonavičius, Lithuanian graphic artist
- Petras Leonavičius, birth name of Petras Leonas, Lithuanian attorney and politician
