= Pick-Up (band) =

Ukrainian alternative rock band

PICK-UP
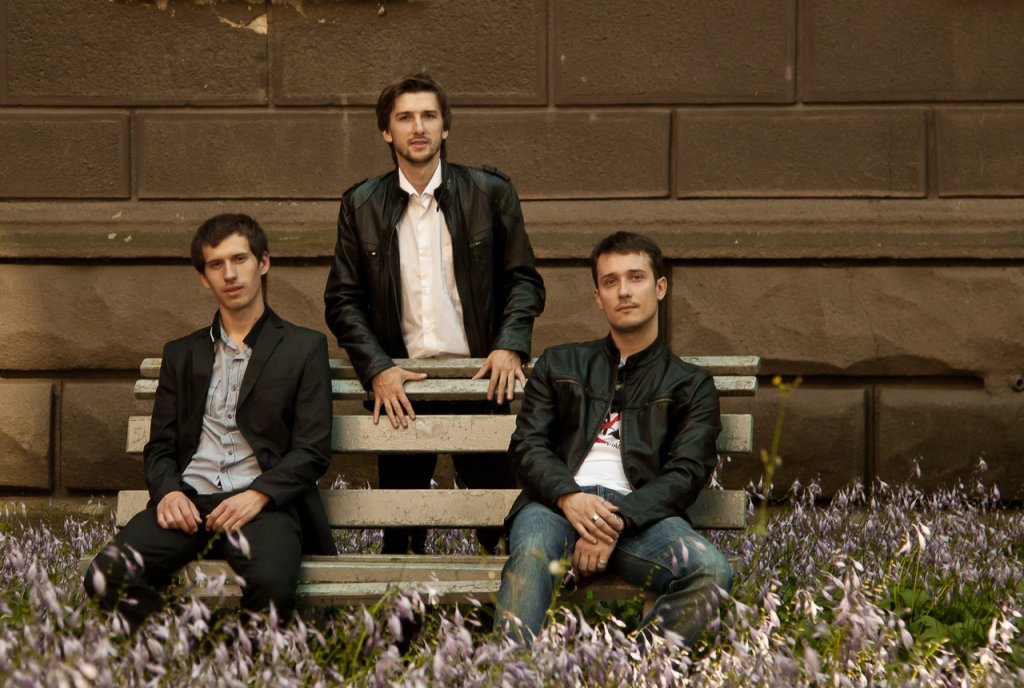
- Pick-up (band)

Background information
- Origin: Kyiv, Ukraine
- Genres: Alternative rock
- Years active: 2005–present
- Labels: iUA Music
- Members: Kostya Leontovich; Michael Orlov; Sergiy Doronin
- Website: pick-up.com.ua

PICK-UP is a Ukrainian alternative rock band from Kyiv, in existence since 2005. Members of the group are Kostya Leontovich (vocals, guitar), Michael Orlov (bass guitar), Danil Kalashnikov(drums). The group has developed a so-called "PICK-UP Sound" — a combination of many musical styles, heavy guitar sound and drive, decorated with beautiful electronic improvisations. In their songs the band raises themes of love, relationships, emotions, beliefs, and social problems. The name of the band is not just a combination of words, but the idea that their songs can lift the spirit of the people. In autumn 2009, they released the song "Bilshe Positiva" (More Positive), which hit the rotation of many radio stations in Ukraine, including Radio NRJ, and Europa Plus. In April 2010 the band signed with an American company iUA Music and releases EP "Closer" worldwide. While remaining an independent artist, PICK-UP organized something that is the epitome of creativity of each participant.

== History ==
=== Formation and early years (2005–2010) ===
PICK-UP was founded in 2005, consisting of Kostya Leontovich and his friend Alexey Ignatusha and Andrey Kropolnitsky, along with Sergei Pankratiev on drums. Title PICK-UP come spontaneously, when the boys had to write something on the booklet of their first concert. Before the end of 2007 the band managed to play at more than thirty Ukrainian festivals and concerts. But PICK-UP paved the way to fame on their own, and not everything was so cloudless: the group had to play in a small dirty clubs, to carry equipment on their shoulders and to go on tour by old trains at their own expense. Not all participants seen in this perspectives and at the end of 2007 the band remained with only 2 members Kostya Leontovich (vocals, guitar) and Alexey Ignatusha (bass). In 2008 the band PICK-UP took new musicians Alexandr Tarasov (drums), Taras Rudenko (piano) and recorded their debut EP titled "Closer". And this album was released only in 2010. But in September 2008, Kostya Leontovich temporarily left the band due to start of a new project, in this connection PICK-UP was frozen and musicians also quit the band. But at the end of this year, PICK-UP was recreated. Throughout 2009 the band played dozens of concerts with the new participants in the face of Valentin Oleinik, Nikita Rusakov, Vasya Dmitriev and Kostya Leontovich. But the views, especially on Christianity and development began to disperse.

The year 2010 meant the time for change, Kostya Leontovich begins to engage in his solo career. But the thought of a successful rock band did not let him go. And he decided to invite a new musicians. Thus PICK-UP had cut its long journey of formation. New members Michael Orlov (bass guitar), Danil Kalashnikov (drums, back vocals) had been fully supported the idea of the group development, and after several months of rehearsals luck turned toward them.

=== Closer – EP (2010) ===
In 2010 the band signed with an American company iUA Music and released their first EP Closer which was recorded back in 2008 in their native Ukrainian language. All the tracks on this EP were composed by the band's lead Kostya Leontovich (guitar/vocal). In an interview about the album, Kostya commented "love that can move the mountains, can save and bring heat in a heart – these are the main message and idea of the whole album. Extended plays “Closer" included four original songs and one bonus track of acoustic version of the main song "Bilshe Positive" (More Positive). PICK-UP was releasing an EP full of mix up which they use and spread out throughout the whole disc, modern rock sound, fascinating melodies, strong vocals and stunning lyrics, and their notable precise songs.

=== "Childhood Lost" (2011) ===
In autumn 2011, PICK-UP released the single "Childhood Lost" in English and in Ukrainian ("Bezpritulnyj Svit"). This song was devoted to the plight of homeless children and those suffering from broken homes. The lyrics of this song are particularly touching and the music is very powerful. "Weeping in silence, the only shelter is the sky....the rules of the street are the rules of push and shove, they teach us to fear and we forget that there is love." The band called everyone to find the strength and courage from this song to lend a helping hand.

=== "Goodbye My Fear" (2012) ===
January 3, PICK-UP released a new single, entitled "Goodbye My Fear". This track talks about the renewal of the heart. The band's composer and lyricist, Kostya Leontovich, commented "only through faith is it possible to feel truly alive. And when your faith is strong, it is easy to forget about all of our fears. As St. Paul offered in his letter to the Romans 'If God is for us, who can be against us?' [Romans 8:31]. This same message of hope can be applied to all of life's problems, so this song was written as a message of encouragement to people." In addition to releasing this single on iTunes and other digital store, PICK-UP shot a music video directed by Ekaterina Bereza. The video was filmed in just two days. The storyline was filmed in an art studio with the real Ukrainian artist at work, so the video had the present look and feel.

=== "The Acoustic Christmas EP" (2013) ===
During the New Year and Christmas holidays the band PICK-UP has prepared a special gift for all fans. 2 January 2013, the world saw the release "The Acoustic Christmas EP", which everyone could download for free from the official website of the band. The holiday EP album included three well-known songs of the group that were performed in an acoustic versions.

=== Реальність (2013) ===
PICK-UP demonstrated to the world a full-fledged debut album – "Реальність" – on May 20, 2013. The band worked in their own studio "Musicball" over the year to produce this album. The disc contains 12 tracks, including two instrumentals. The album was released on CDs, as well as digitally on iTunes and Google Play. By the way, the digital release of the album contains 3 additional bonus tracks. "We walked a long way for this album and for me,"Реальність"- is an example of honest hard work on the creation of PICK-UP's original sound," commented the band's lead Kostya Leontovich. – "Every song is a peculiar story with unique plot. We did not have much experience in studio recording, but we tried to find creative approaches to the quality and relevance of the material. So first of all, it's an honest album!" The first single from the album "Реальність" – the song "Дівчина З Голлівуду" – was presented at the beginning of May, and its music video, filmed by director Katerina Bereza, received airplay on Ukrainian music channels.

== Members ==
- Kostya Leontovich – lead vocals, guitar 2005–present
- Michael Orlov – bass 2010–present
- Danil Kalashnikov – drums 2013–present

== Discography ==
=== Studio albums ===
| Title | Details |
|---|---|
| Реальність | Release date: 20 May 2013; Label: iUA Music; Formats: CD, digital |

=== Extended plays ===
| Title | Details |
|---|---|
| Ближче EP | Release date: May 3, 2010; Label: iUA Music; Formats: music download |
| The Acoustic Christmas EP | Release date: Jan 02, 2013; Label: Independent; Formats: music download |

== Videography ==
- Більше Позитива
- Goodbye My Fear
- Дівчина З Голлівуду
