= Wicked Woman (film) =

1953 film by Russell Rouse

- Theatrical release poster
- Directed by: Russell Rouse
- Screenplay by: Clarence Greene; Russell Rouse
- Produced by: Clarence Greene
- Starring: Beverly Michaels; Richard Egan; Percy Helton; Evelyn Scott
- Cinematography: Edward Fitzgerald
- Edited by: Chester W. Schaeffer
- Music by: Buddy Baker
- Production company: Edward Small Productions
- Distributed by: United Artists
- Release date: December 9, 1953 (United States)
- Running time: 77 minutes
- Country: United States
- Language: English

Wicked Woman is a 1953 American film noir starring Beverly Michaels, Richard Egan, Percy Helton, and Evelyn Scott. Directed by Russell Rouse, the film was written by Rouse and Clarence Greene.

== Plot ==
An attractive blonde drifter, Billie Nash (Beverly Michaels), arrives in town on a bus and gets a job as a waitress at a local bar. She sets her sights on the bar's handsome owner, Matt Bannister (Richard Egan), who is married to Dora (Evelyn Scott), who inherited the bar from her alcoholic father and is an alcoholic herself. Nash seduces Bannister and they scheme to sell the bar without Dora's knowledge and skip to Mexico together.

They succeed in executing the paperwork with Nash impersonating Dora, but there is an escrow period before the sale is final. Charlie (Percy Helton), a boarder at the rooming house where Nash is staying, has overheard the plot and attempts to blackmail Nash into being his girlfriend. Bannister discovers them together and calls Nash a "tramp" and a fight ensues. The fraud and forgery is laid bare but Dora arranges for the sale of the bar to be canceled. Nash leaves town on a bus.

== Cast ==
- Beverly Michaels as Billie Nash
- Richard Egan as Matt Bannister
- Percy Helton as Charlie Borg
- Evelyn Scott as Dora Bannister
- Robert Osterloh as Larry Lowry
- Frank Ferguson as Bill Porter
- Bernadene Hayes as Mrs. Walters

== Production ==
The low-budget film, produced under the working title of Free and Easy, was the first leading role for Richard Egan.

== Reception ==
A contemporary review in The New York Times called the film a "misguided little melodrama" that "manages to squander some persuasively realistic upholstery".

In 2004 The Village Voice praised Michaels's performance as "wonderfully lurid," and included the movie in a list of the 25 most memorable cult films.
