= Howland Chamberlain =

American actor (1911–1984)

- Born: Howland Chamberlin; August 2, 1911; Bronx, New York City, U.S.
- Died: September 1, 1984 (aged 73); Oakland, California, U.S.
- Other name: Howard Chamberlain

Howland Chamberlain (August 2, 1911 – September 1, 1984) was an American actor. He was sometimes billed as Howard Chamberlain, or with the original spelling of his last name as Howland Chamberlin.

== Career ==
Chamberlain was born in The Bronx. In the 1930s, he moved from New York to Los Angeles to try his hand at acting. Beginning in 1933, he obtained supporting parts at the Pasadena Community Playhouse. He appeared in Foolscap, or The Last Judgment (billed as Howard Chamberlain), Richard III, and King John. In 1935, he returned to New York for a role in the Broadway play, Achilles Had a Heel, but it only ran for eight performances. In the late 1930s, he was active in the Federal Theatre Project's regional center in Los Angeles. It was at this time that he met his future wife, Leona Adele Hines, whom he married in June 1939.

In 1946, Chamberlain made his film debut in the Oscar-winning drama The Best Years of Our Lives, portraying Mr. Thorpe, the drug store manager who conducts an informal job interview of Fred Derry (portrayed by Dana Andrews). From 1947–1952, Chamberlain was a steadily working character actor, appearing in over 15 movies. He also landed guest spots in early television series such as Dick Tracy, Racket Squad, Fireside Theatre, and The Adventures of Superman. He was often cast in film noirs where he specialized in playing nervous types, like the frightened bookkeeper Freddie Bauer in Force of Evil (1948). Although Chamberlain was uncredited in High Noon (1952), he was memorable as the cynical hotel desk clerk who speaks ill of Marshal Will Kane to his new bride played by Grace Kelly.

Because of the Hollywood blacklist, High Noon would be Chamberlain's last film work for more than 20 years. He was first brought to the attention of Congressional investigators in 1940 when Rena Vale named him to the Special Committee on Un-American Activities, chaired by Congressman Martin Dies. Vale told the Dies Committee that in 1938 the Federal Theater Project's Los Angeles chapter was a front for the Communist Party USA, and that Chamberlain was an active member in it. He was also reportedly named to the FBI as a Communist by Ronald Reagan.

On September 18, 1951, Chamberlain was called before the House Un-American Activities Committee (HUAC). He declined to answer questions, invoking the Fifth Amendment's shield against self-incrimination. In a heated exchange with HUAC Chairman John S. Wood and Chief Counsel Frank Tavenner, Chamberlain said, "My present occupation is an actor, and I find it deeply repugnant and profoundly un-American to be smeared, blacklisted, and strangled economically by my presence before this committee." After his HUAC testimony, his screen acting career came to a halt.

Not much is known about how Chamberlain earned a living as a blacklistee over the next two decades. He was said to have toured in plays such as A Raisin in the Sun, and had small roles in Off-Broadway productions including Children of Darkness and The Courageous One, as well as in Shakespeare plays performed at New York City's Shakespeare in the Park festival. He had a guest spot on episode 15 of the 1966 TV series Hawk. He landed the role of Patch Riley in the 1974 TV movie A Touch of the Poet, based on the Eugene O'Neill play. He returned to the Broadway stage in 1976 with a minor part, and understudy assignments, in Larry Gelbart's long-running comedy, Sly Fox.

During the 1970s, with the blacklist no longer barring him from work, Chamberlain started getting cast with greater frequency in TV shows and movies. He appeared in a 1976 episode of Kojak and in multiple episodes of the soap opera Ryan's Hope. Among his more significant roles was as the divorce court judge in Robert Benton's award-winning 1979 film Kramer vs. Kramer. Chamberlain's last two performances were in Barbarosa (1982) and Electric Dreams (1984).

== Death ==
Howland Chamberlain died of heart disease on September 1, 1984, in Oakland, California. He was 73.

== Filmography ==
Year	Title	Role	Notes
1946	The Best Years of Our Lives	Mr. Thorpe	
1947	The Web	James Nolan	
1947	Brute Force	Joe's Lawyer	uncredited
1947	Driftwood	Hiram Trumbell	
1948	Feudin', Fussin' and A-Fightin'	Doc Overholt	
1948	Angel in Exile	J. H. Higgins	
1948	A Song Is Born	Mr. Setter	
1948	Force of Evil	Freddie Bauer	
1949	Thieves' Highway	Mr. Faber	uncredited
1949	And Baby Makes Three	Otto Stacy - Lawyer	
1950	Francis	Maj. Nadel	
1950	House by the River	District Attorney	
1950	Edge of Doom	Mr. Murray, the Funeral Director	
1950	Surrender	The Casino Manager	
1950	Mister 880	Duff	uncredited
1951	No Questions Asked	Beebe	
1951	Pickup	'The Professor', tramp	
1951	The Racket	Roy Higgins	uncredited
1951	The Big Night	Flanagan	
1952	High Noon	Hotel Clerk	Uncredited
1979	Kramer vs. Kramer	Judge Atkins	
1982	Barbarosa	Emil	
1984	Electric Dreams	Neighbor	

== Broadway appearances ==
Chamberlain's Broadway credits included Achilles Had a Heel (1935), Sly Fox (1976–78), and Stages (1978).
