= A Life of Her Own =

1950 film

- Theatrical poster
- Directed by: George Cukor
- Written by: Isobel Lennart
- Based on: The Abiding Vision (1935 novella) by Rebecca West
- Produced by: Voldemar Vetluguin
- Starring: Lana Turner; Ray Milland
- Cinematography: George J. Folsey
- Edited by: George White
- Music by: Bronisław Kaper
- Production company: Metro-Goldwyn-Mayer
- Distributed by: Loew's Inc.
- Release date: September 1, 1950
- Running time: 108 minutes
- Country: United States
- Language: English
- Budget: $1,818,000
- Box office: $1,917,000

A Life of Her Own is a 1950 American melodrama film directed by George Cukor and starring Lana Turner and Ray Milland. The screenplay by Isobel Lennart focuses on an aspiring model who leaves her small town in the Midwest to seek fame and fortune in New York City. The film was produced by Voldemar Vetluguin and distributed by Metro-Goldwyn-Mayer.

== Plot ==
Lily Brannel James leaves her small hometown in Kansas for New York City and is hired by a modeling agency. She befriends former top model Mary Ashlon, who becomes her mentor. Mary gives Lily a ceramic shoe as a good-luck charm. Mary is depressed about her floundering career and, following a night of excessive drinking, she commits suicide.

Lily eventually becomes a very successful model. As a favor to her attorney friend Jim Leversoe, she spends some time with Steve Harleigh, a Montana copper-mine owner in New York on business. The two fall in love, but both realize that nothing can result from it. After Steve returns home, he asks Jim to buy Lily a bracelet, but she refuses to accept it.

Lily finds that success does not fill the void in her life. Steve returns to New York to secure a loan and asks to see Lily. When they meet, he tells her that he is married. His wife Nora was left a paraplegic in an automobile accident for which he was responsible. However, Steve and Lily find that their feelings for each other are too strong, and they embark on an affair.

Nora visits Steve to celebrate his birthday. On the same night, Lily hosts a party, although Steve stays with Nora, who is making progress in learning to walk again with leg braces and canes. Steve sneaks to Lily's party and is taken aback by her self-destructive behavior.

Lily decides to confront Nora and asks Jim to accompany her. However, when she sees how nice Nora is and how dependent she is on her husband, Lily cannot tell her about her involvement with Steve. On the way out, she encounters Steve at the elevator and tells him that the affair must end.

Some time later, Lily runs into advertising executive Lee Gorrance, who had been dating Mary just prior to her death. When Lily resists his romantic advances, Lee predicts that she will become lonely and depressed as Mary had been. Upset by his comments, Lily considers ending her own life, but finally resolves to remain strong, even if she is lonely. She examines the ceramic shoe that Mary had given her and smashes it on the sidewalk and smiles as she walks down the street toward her new life.

== Cast ==
- Lana Turner as Lily Brannel James
- Ray Milland as Steve Harleigh
- Tom Ewell as Tom Caraway
- Louis Calhern as Jim Leversoe
- Ann Dvorak as Mary Ashlon
- Barry Sullivan as Lee Gorrance
- Margaret Phillips as Nora Harleigh
- Jean Hagen as Maggie Collins
- Phyllis Kirk as Jerry
- Sara Haden as Smitty
- Hermes Pan as Specialty Dancer

== Production ==
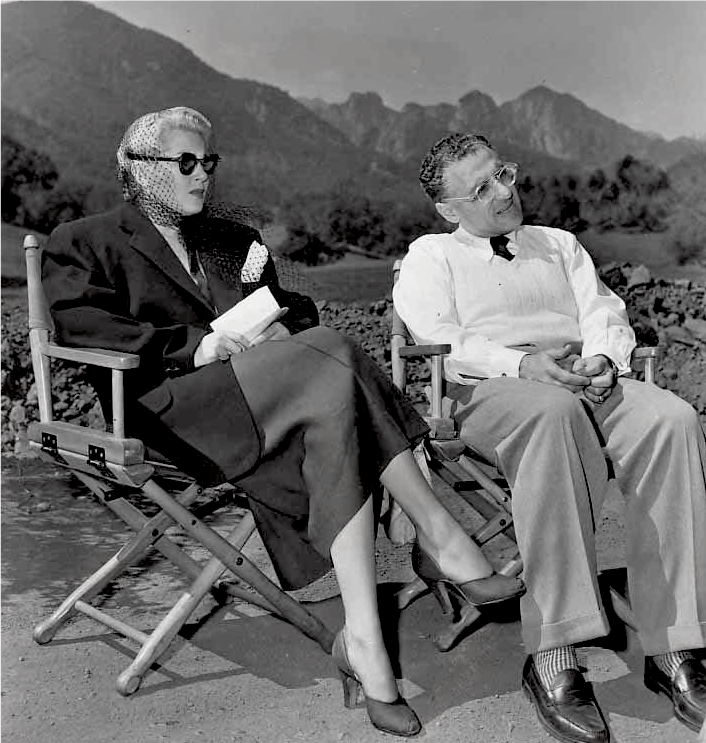
Lana Turner and George Cukor on set during filming

The story was loosely adapted from British author Rebecca West's story "The Abiding Vision" from her 1935 book The Harsh Voice: Four Short Novels. Motion Picture Production Code administrator Joseph Breen rejected the original script as unacceptable, terming it "shocking and highly offensive" for its portrayal of "adultery and commercialized prostitution," while a revised version was found to have "insufficient compensating moral values." In order to bring the story into agreement with the Production Code, screenwriter Isobel Lennart was required to "show that the adulterous situation is wrong and that sinners must be punished for their sin."

Vincente Minnelli was originally assigned to direct the film, but numerous script revisions and problems with casting delayed the start of production by several months, and Minnelli began work on Father of the Bride instead. Lana Turner initially refused to star in the film, but MGM executives Louis B. Mayer and Dore Schary demanded that she honor her contract with the studio. Howard Keel, Cary Grant, George Murphy and James Mason were among those considered for the role of Steve Harleigh, which eventually went to Wendell Corey, who worked on the production through mid-February 1950 but then allegedly asked to be released from the film because he felt that he was not right for the role. Other sources claimed that Corey was dismissed at the request of Turner and Cukor following an argument. Corey was replaced by Ray Milland.

The film's original ending had Lily leaping to her death, but the studio insisted on a happier finale. Cukor disapproved of the studio's interference and was unhappy with the film as it was released.

== Music ==
The film's main theme was later reused by composer Bronisław Kaper in the 1952 MGM film Invitation. Kaper was nominated for the Golden Globe Award for Best Original Score but lost to Franz Waxman for Sunset Boulevard.

== Reception ==
In a contemporary review for The New York Times, critic Bosley Crowther wrote:

Somehow, while watching this picture, with its cliches, its lush inanities and its vacuum-sealed preoccupation with the two-bit emotions of one dame, it was difficult for this reviewer to believe that such a film had been made in this year, 1950, and with the world in the state that it is. Pictures like this were the fashion fifteen years ago, when the screen and its candy-munching audience were in a much more infantile stage. But apparently the powers that be at Metro decided that there still is a place for a poor little glamour-girl story—and that Miss Turner has what it takes. And so we have the present item, with Miss Turner playing the glittering role of the model with the airiness and manners of a sales clerk in a chic department store, plainly self-conscious of her hair-do, her clothing, her billing and her bust. And we have poor Ray Milland playing the Montana sap who falls for her with a perpetual air of discomfort, indicating that he had read the script.

Critic Philip K. Scheuer of the Los Angeles Times wrote: "The results are not all that could be desired. For one thing, times have changed. The story has to be awfully well attuned to ring true today; or else awfully witty. And a certain honesty—at least of intention—does come through. But ... Cukor, while he may be able to make the fair sound good, to impart a certain sparkle and bite to the obvious, cannot sustain the whole illusion himself for nearly two hours. Nor has he."

According to MGM records, the film earned $1,413,000 in the U.S. and Canada and $504,000 elsewhere, resulting in a loss of $679,000.
