= Pickup (1951 film) =

1951 film by Hugo Haas

- Theatrical release poster
- Directed by: Hugo Haas
- Screenplay by: Hugo Haas; Arnold Lippschitz
- Based on: Guard No. 47 (novel) by Josef Kopta
- Produced by: Hugo Haas
- Starring: Beverly Michaels; Hugo Haas; Allan Nixon; Howland Chamberlain; Jo-Carroll Dennison
- Cinematography: Paul Ivano
- Edited by: W. L. Bagier
- Music by: Harold Byrns
- Color process: Black and white
- Production company: Forum Productions
- Distributed by: Columbia Pictures
- Release date: August 30, 1951 (New York)
- Running time: 78 minutes
- Country: United States
- Language: English

Pickup is a 1951 American film noir released by Columbia Pictures and starring Hugo Haas, Beverly Michaels, Allan Nixon and Howland Chamberlain. Written and directed by Haas, a Czech actor and filmmaker, it was his American debut behind the camera and the first of a series of gloomy films about doomed middle-aged men led astray by younger femmes fatales.

The film is based on the 1926 novel Guard No. 47 by Josef Kopta, and its plot is similar to that of the 1946 film The Postman Always Rings Twice, although with a different ending.

== Plot ==
Czech-American widower Jan "Hunky" Horak is a middle-aged railroad dispatcher who operates isolated Tank Stop 47, several miles out of town, by himself. When he takes a rare Sunday holiday, he is replaced by a younger man named Steve. While at a carnival, he is targeted by a young, attractive blonde named Betty, who is just after his money. After their date, she returns to her room but finds she and her friend Irma have been evicted, not having paid rent for months, and her landlady threatens to call the police unless she returns the silverware and linen that she hocked. To solve her financial problems, she marries Hunky.

Hunky loses his hearing and is allowed to retire early. Steve is his replacement, but as the retirement paperwork will take weeks to complete, Steve temporarily lives in a shed across the tracks from the company-provided house where Hunky and Betty reside. Steve knows what kind of woman Betty is, as she had dated someone whom he knows, but he falls in love with her.

When Hunky is felled by a car, he regains his hearing but does not inform anyone, afraid that he might lose his company pension. Betty, not realizing that Hunky can hear her, talks openly in his presence about how she had only married him to settle her financial woes and that she will not remain with him.

After Betty learns that she cannot obtain a divorce, she unsuccessfully attempts to persuade Hunky to move his savings into a joint account. She next tries to convince Steve to shove Hunky from a cliff during a rail inspection, falsely claiming that Hunky has beaten her, but Steve cannot allow himself to commit murder. Disgusted, Betty packs her things and leaves.

== Cast ==
- Hugo Haas as Jan Horak
- Beverly Michaels as Betty
- Allan Nixon as Steve
- Howland Chamberlain as Professor
- Jo-Carroll Dennison as Irma
- Mark Lowell as Waiter
- Marjorie Beckett as Secretary of the Doctor
- Art Lewis as Driver
- Jack Daley as Company Doctor
- Bernard Gorcey as Joe

== Reception ==
In a contemporary review for The New York Times, critic A. H. Weiler called the film "an unassuming but serious accomplishment" and wrote: "'Pickup,' in short, does well in capturing a sombre mood. And its central character and his torments are fully conceived and realized. But his story is obvious drama, which is not enhanced by unconvincing supporting performances."

In his book Destination Hollywood: The Influence of Europeans on American Filmmaking, film historian Larry Langman called Pickup "a poor man's version" of the 1946 film The Postman Always Rings Twice, based on James M. Cain's 1934 novel The Postman Always Rings Twice.

== See also ==
- Guard No. 47, a 2008 Czech film based on the same novel
