= Kostya Leontovich =

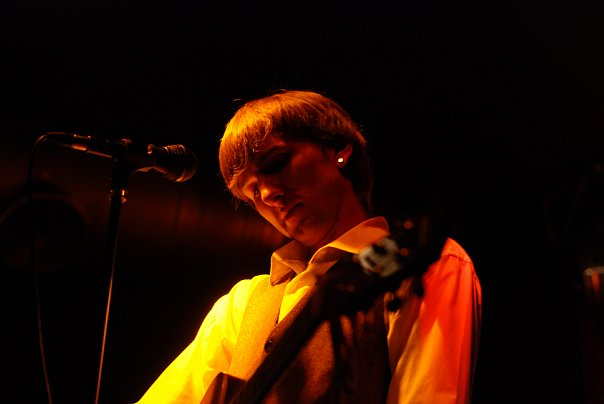
- Kostya Leontovich

Background information
- Born: Kostyantyn Kostyantynovych Leontovich; October 13, 1985 (age 40)
- Origin: Kyiv, Ukraine
- Genres: Film score, Pop rock, alternative rock
- Occupations: Composer, musician, guitarist, record producer
- Instruments: guitar, vocals, keyboards
- Years active: 2010–present
- Label: Musicball Records
- Website: http://kostyaleontovich.com

Kostyantyn Kostyantynovych Leontovich (born October 13, 1985), better known as Kostya Leontovich, is a Ukrainian film score composer, record producer, musician, mixer, singer-songwriter, founder of the label Musicball Records and Musicball Rock School.

== Personal life ==
Kostya Leontovich was born and raised in Kyiv, the son of Marianna and Kostyantin Leontovich. He has one older sister, Alexandra, and one younger brother, David. His father, Kostyantyn Pavlovych Leontovich was skilled at singing and playing guitar. Kostya received his first musical lessons from him. His mother, Marianna Olegovna Leontovich is also a singer and a music teacher. As a child Kostya, tried almost all kinds of arts and activities – dances, singing in choir, piano, acrobatics, basketball, and even the circus arts. But from the age of 15 years decided to become a musician.
Kostya Leontovich married Anna Leontovich in 2012, and the couple had a son in 2015.

== Career ==
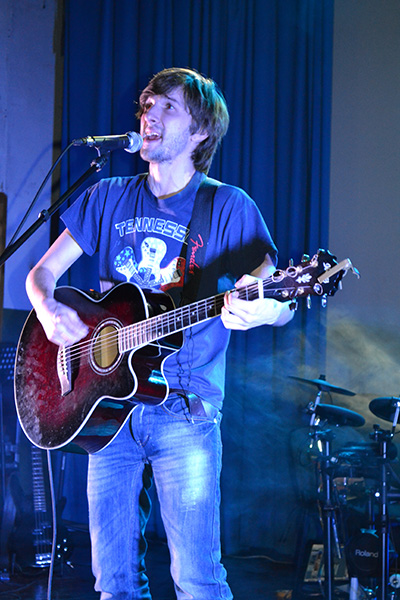
Kostya Leontovich performing with PICK-UP in 2013

Although he had been performing since he was five, when he was singing on the stage of art school and even was a part of a tour to France at nine, Kostya Leontovich didn't start playing the guitar until he was fourteen. He received his first guitar lessons from his father and as a teenager started his own punk rock band. Then he played at the University musical group. At this time, Kostya began to write songs and by 2005 had about a hundred of them. The same year he founded the alternative rock band PICK-UP. They performed a lot and released one full length album and several EPs and singles worldwide.

=== 2011 Against the Flow – EP ===
Besides being the main singer-songwriter for PICK-UP, Leontovich has also made musical contributions outside his band and worked as a solo artist. In June 2011, he released his debut EP, Against the Flow, independently, playing almost all instruments. The lyrical depth to Kostya's songs reflect his faith in God and personal experience.

=== 2013 MusicBall Rock School ===
Kostya started teaching guitar lessons during his school years and a lot of experience, number of students, as well as personal methods led him to the idea of creating an educational institution in which besides ordinary guitar lessons, the student will be able to play in a band, perform at the rock shows and recording songs in the studio. Thus in 2013 Leontovich founded MusicBall Rock School.

== Filmography ==
Year	Title	Director	Studio	Notes
2015	On the Edge	Andrey Muhin	ArtAwaken	Additional Music
2018	Metanoya	Andrey Muhin	ArtAwaken	Main Composer
2019	One Way	Dima Muhin	Muhin Company	Main Composer
2019	Готель Едельвейс	Yurii Rudyi	Content Film Group	Main Composer
2023	Adrift	Rory Kennedy	AR Content, Moxie Films	Additional Music

== Solo discography ==
=== Singles ===
- 2010 Heavenly Atmosphere
- 2015 More Than Rock and Roll
- 2016 Amazing
- 2017 Home
- 2018 Salvation
- 2018 Pafkindayl Theme
- 2019 Door to Eternity

=== Extended plays ===
Against The Flow	Release date: June 7, 2011; Label: iUA Music, Independently (re-released); Formats: music download, CD
Unbreakable Hope (Original Score)	Release date: March 29, 2017; Label: Musicball Records; Formats: music download, CD

== PICK-UP Discography ==
=== Studio albums ===
Title	Details
Реальність	Release date: May 20, 2013 and April 20, 2015; Label: iUA Music, MusicBall; Formats: CD, digital

=== Extended plays ===
Title	Details
Closer EP	Release date: May 3, 2010; Label: iUA Music; Formats: music download
The Acoustic Christmas EP	Release date: January 2, 2013; Label: Independent; Formats: music download

== Video ==
=== Official Music Video ===
- Heavenly Atmosphere
- We Praise
- Against The Flow
