= Strange Portrait =

- Directed by: Jeffrey Stone
- Produced by: Terry Bourke
- Starring: Jeffrey Hunter; Tina Hutchence; Barbara Lee; Mai Tai Sing; Christina Stone; John Wallace
- Edited by: Peter R. Hunt
- Music by: Paul Lewis
- Production company: East-West Motion Picture Co.
- Country: Singapore
- Language: English
- Budget: $320,000

Strange Portrait was a film shot in Hong Kong in 1966. It was directed by Jeffrey Stone and starred Jeffrey Hunter, Barbara Lee, Mai Tai Sing and Tina Hutchence. Stone and his wife went searching for a distributor, hoping to enter it into the Asian Film Festival; however, the film was never released, with sources differing as to the reason. One report is that it was destroyed in a warehouse fire. Stone said the film was suppressed by the film studio at the behest of the Hong Kong government because of a scene featuring partial nudity. It is considered to be a lost film.

== Synopsis ==
The film has been described as a "spooky thriller". Jeffrey Hunter played the role of Mark, an expat American and petty thief in Hong Kong who lives with his Chinese girlfriend (Barbara Lee). One day while watching a soccer game, a mansion catches his eye and he breaks into it. Whilst inside, he notices a portrait there that closely resembles him. The only person living in the mansion is a wealthy but insane woman (Mai Tai Sing). Mark finds out that the subject of the painting is actually her husband, who apparently deserted her years ago. He also discovers that she has an abundance of jewelry, and decides to woo her and pretend that he is her departed husband. While entering the mansion's walk-in safe to steal the woman's jewelry, he is shocked to discover her husband's mummified corpse inside. The woman locks Mark inside the safe and then falls fatally down a staircase, leaving Mark to his doom.

== Cast and crew ==
Jason Evers was the original choice for the lead role. He had to vacate the role in favor of a television pilot, Three for Danger ; thus the role was filled by Jeffrey Hunter even though his agent was not keen on the idea.

At the time of filming, Jeffrey Hunter was in a relationship with Mai Tai Sing, a businesswoman who had acted in the television series Hong Kong.

Patricia Hutchence, the makeup artist in this film, was the mother of INXS frontman Michael Hutchence. Her daughter Tina Hutchence, who had a role in the film, is Hutchence's half-sister.

Barbara Lee, better known by her stage name Barbara Yu Ling, was the first Singaporean Chinese actress to achieve success in Europe. According to director Jeffrey Stone's memoirs, Strange Portrait was suppressed by the Hong Kong censors because of a scene Lee shared with Jeffrey Hunter in which her breasts were partially visible.

Christina Stone, who played the part of a ballet dancer, was the wife of Jeffrey Stone. She was once married to cinema magnate Dato Loke Wan Tho.

=== Actors ===
- Jeffrey Hunter as Mark
- Tina Hutchence
- Mai Tai Sing
- Barbara Lee
- Christina Stone
- John Wallace

=== Crew ===
- Jeffrey Stone – director & writer
- Terry Bourke – associate producer
- Paul Lewis – music
- Peter R. Hunt – editor
- Patricia Hutchence – makeup artist
- Peter MacGregor-Scott – assistant director
