= William Glasgow =

William Glasgow may refer to:

- William Glasgow (art director) (1906–1972), American art director
- William Glasgow (general) (1876–1955), Australian general and politician
- William Anderson Glasgow Sr. (1825–1910), American lawyer and politician
- William A. Glasgow Jr. (1865–1930), his son, American lawyer, and government and political official
- William J. Glasgow (1866–1967), officer in the United States Army
