= Barbara Yu Ling =

Singapore-born actress

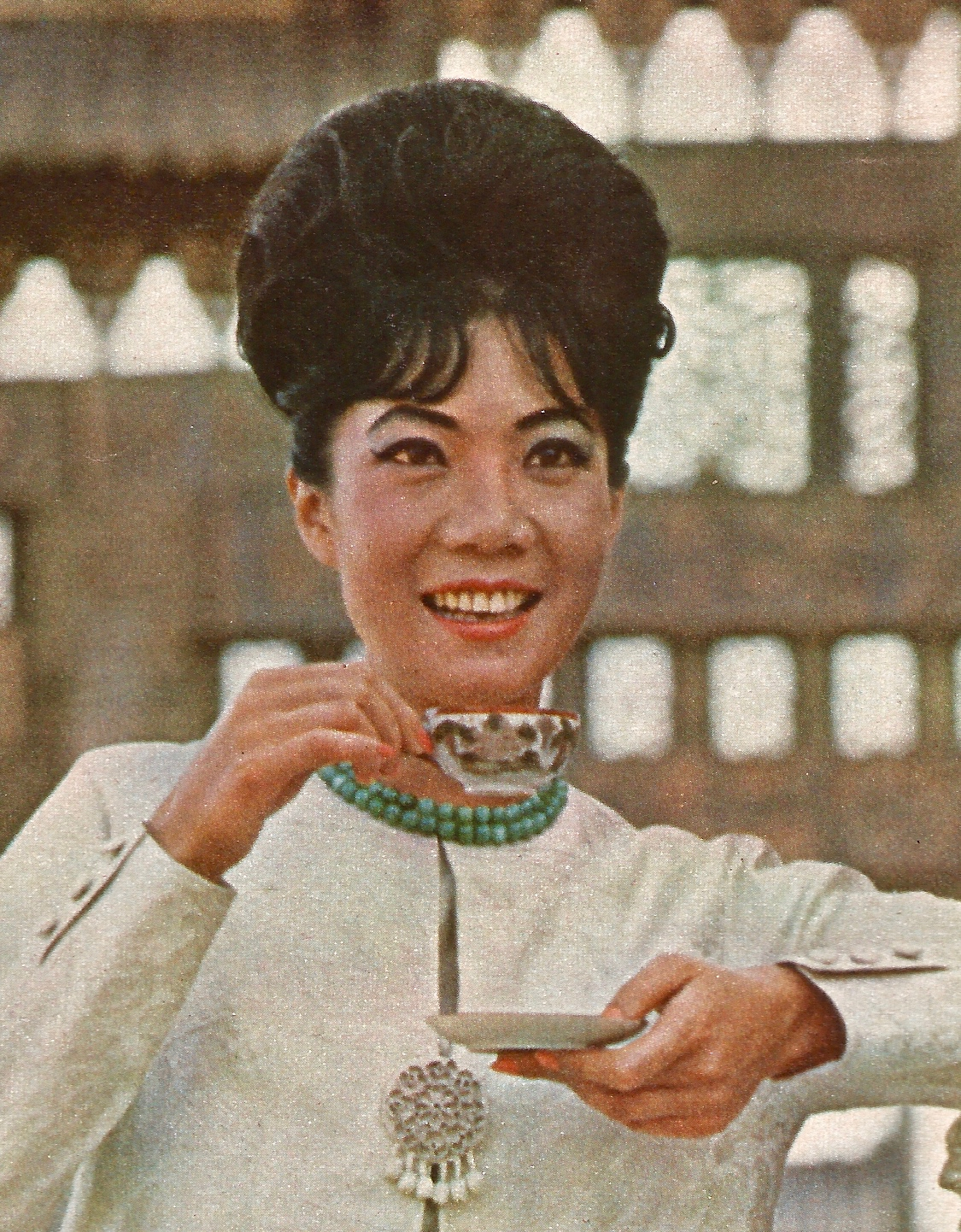
- Yu Ling in 1962 during filming of 55 Days at Peking
- Born: Barbara Yu Ling Lee; 4 November 1933/1938; Singapore, Straits Settlements
- Died: 6 April 1997; London Borough of Camden, UK
- Other names: Barbara Lee, Barbara Lee Yuling, Yu Ling
- Occupation: Actress
- Years active: 1957–1997
- Spouse: Ian Albery (m. 1966, divorced)
- Children: 2

Barbara Lee (4 November 1933/1938 – 6 April 1997), (Note: While some UK sources, including death indexes, record her year of birth as 1938, most other sources indicate a birth year of 1933.) who used the stage name Barbara Yu Ling, was a Singapore-born actress of stage, screen, and television who was based in Britain from the 1950s. One of the first Singaporean Chinese actresses to gain attention in Europe, she appeared in productions of Madame Butterfly and The World of Suzie Wong. Among the films she appeared in were The Satanic Rites of Dracula (1973), Ping Pong (1986), and Peggy Su! (1997).

== Biography ==
Lee was born in Singapore. Her father was a schoolteacher, and her mother died young. A protégée of Malcolm MacDonald, Britain's Commissioner-General to Southeast Asia, she worked as a teacher before moving to England in 1955 to study at London's Central School of Speech Training and Dramatic Art. MacDonald introduced Lee to Dame Sybil Thorndike, who aided Lee with her performing career. Her sister Dorothy Lee, who joined her in England, later became the wife and collaborator of illustrator Paul Goble.

Lee married British theatre producer Ian Albery in 1966; the couple had two sons before the marriage ended in divorce.

She died of cancer at her home in London on 6 April 1997.

== Acting career ==
Lee's first major acting role was the BBC's 1957 television production of the opera Madame Butterfly as Suzuki, although the actors' singing was dubbed by professionals.

In 1958 she toured Italy in the supporting cast of Sayonara Butterfly, a parody of Madame Butterfly written by Marcello Marchesi, Renzo Punzoni and Italo Terzoli. She co-starred with Tsai Chin in the British production of The World of Suzie Wong that ran at London's Prince of Wales Theatre from 1959 to 1961. (Note: Jeffrey Stone wrote in his memoirs that Lee had also appeared in a production of Flower Drum Song; however, her name is not listed among the cast members of the 1960 London production, suggesting he may have confused this with her role in The World of Suzie Wong.)

In 1966 she had a co-starring role with Jeffrey Hunter in the Hong Kong-shot film Strange Portrait. She played a ballerina and girlfriend of the main character played by Hunter. The film was never released and is now believed lost. According to director Jeffrey Stone, the film was suppressed by the Hong Kong censors because of a scene in which Lee appeared partially nude.

In 1973 she had her most prominent film role, as cult leader Chin Yang in The Satanic Rites of Dracula (released in the U.S. as Count Dracula and His Vampire Bride). Author Paul Meehan commented that stars Christopher Lee and Peter Cushing were "ably assisted by the quirky portrayals of Freddie Jones and Barbara Yu Ling in supporting roles."

In the 1980s she played the part of May in the Australian Broadcasting Corporation / British Broadcasting Corporation co-production Tenko, and appeared in Ping Pong (1986), the first film to be shot in London's Chinatown.

In 1990 she was in the Richard Stanley's science-fiction film Hardware. Her final film appearance was a supporting role in 1997's Peggy Su!, a romantic comedy about a Chinese teenager (played by Pamela Oei) and her family set in 1960s Liverpool, England.

== Filmography ==
=== Film ===
- Windom's Way (1957) as Nurse (unbilled)
- Yangtse Incident: The Story of H.M.S. Amethyst (1957) as Sampan woman (unbilled)
- The Camp on Blood Island (1958) as Woman prisoner (as Barbara Lee)
- 55 Days at Peking (1963) (unbilled extra)
- The World Ten Times Over (1963) as Georgia (unbilled)
- Strange Portrait (1966) (unreleased)
- Koroshi (1968) (TV Movie) as Hostess
- The Satanic Rites of Dracula (U.S. title: Count Dracula and His Vampire Bride) (1973) as Chin Yang
- Ping Pong (1986) as Cherry
- Hardware (1990) as Chinese Mother
- Peggy Su! (1997) as David's Mother

=== Television ===
- Madame Butterfly (1957) as Suzuki
- Danger Man (1960-1968) – Series 1 (1961), Episode 22: "The Honeymooners" as Maid (as Barbara Lee)
- The Avengers (1961-1969) – Season 3 (1963), Episode 11: "The Golden Fleece" as Mrs Kwan (as Yu Ling)
- Danger Man – Series 3 (1965), Episode 2: "A Very Dangerous Game" as Second Hostess (as Yu Ling)
- The Prisoner (1967-1968) – Episode 1: "Arrival" as Number 16, a taxi driver
- Jackanory (1965-1996) – Season 2 (1967), Episode 186: "The Inn of Donkeys" as Third Lady
- Danger Man – Series 4 (1968), Episode 2: "Shinda Shima" as Hostess
- The Troubleshooters (1965-1972) – Season 5 (1969), Episode 7: "You're Not Going to Believe This, But..." as Jenny Kwong
- Shirley's World (1971-1972) – Episode 15: "Figuratively Speaking" as Choa Chun
- Gangsters (1978 series) – Episode 5: "Enter the White Devil" as Rosie
- Tenko – Series 2 (1982) Episode 5; Series 3 (1984) Episodes 5 & 8; as May

== Theatre roles ==
- Sayonara Butterfly (Italy, 1958–1959)
- The World of Suzie Wong (London, 1959–1961) as Typhoo
- The Professor (by Hal Porter) (London, 1965) as Katsura

== Radio credits ==
- Shopping (1991) – BBC Radio 4 play by Kevin Wong.
