= Perfumes of Singapore =

Perfume company

Perfumes of Singapore Pte Ltd
- Formerly: Perfumes Of The Orient
- Founded: 1962; 64 years ago in Singapore
- Founders: Christina Balsara; Jeffrey Stone; Dadi Balsara
- Defunct: 2008
- Fate: Re-registered in 2016 by Singapore Memories
- Headquarters: Singapore
- Key people: Prachi Saini Garg
- Products: perfumes
- Brands: Singapore Girl; Reves De Singapour
- Owner: Prachi Saini Garg
- Parent: Singapore Memories Pte Ltd

Perfumes of Singapore, formerly known as Perfumes of the Orient, was a defunct perfume company which produced the scent series called Girl. Notably, it produces the popular Singapore Girl Perfume in the 1960s and 1970s.

Perfumes of Singapore owned several fragrance brands, but somehow Singapore Girl become very popular and even today, it is sometimes seen being sold at various antique auctions, online and offline. It was sold in most stores, malls and onboard Singapore Airlines.

== Perfumes of the Orient ==
Christina Stone and Jeffrey Stone founded Perfumes of the Orient in 1962. Its factories were located in Jurong and Petaling Jaya, Malaysia.

== Perfumes of Singapore ==
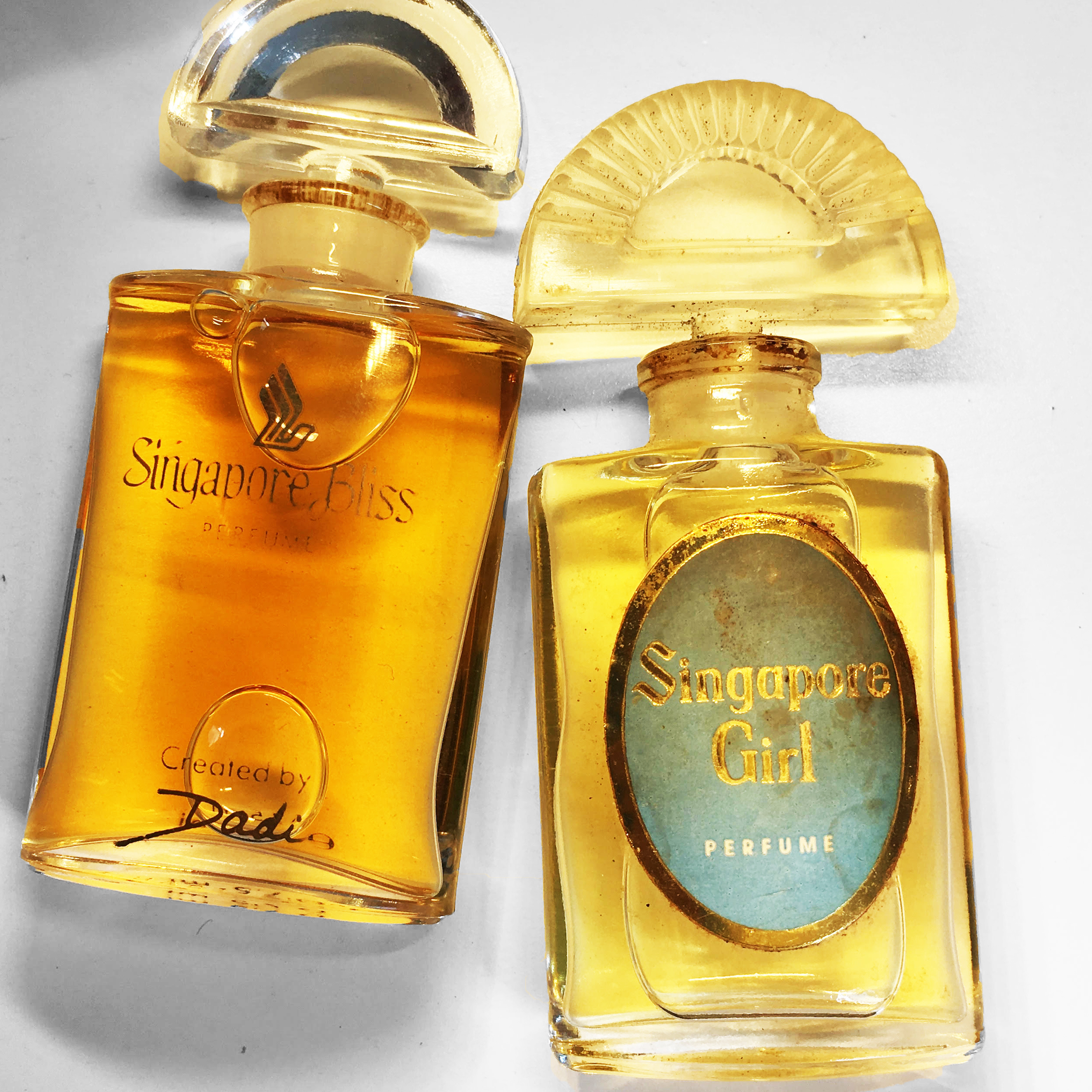
Singapore Girl & Singapore Bliss Perfumes by 'Perfumes of Singapore' Group

After her divorce to Jeffrey, Christina married Indian businessman Dadi Balsara who rebranded the existing scents under the name Perfumes of Singapore. The couple then launched a new scent series called 'Girl'. This included, Australian Girl, California Girl, Hawaii Girl, Hong Kong Girl & Singapore Girl. Of these, most popular was 'Singapore Girl'.

The company closed down in 2008 after Dadi Balsara secured support from the Indian government to undertake large scale projects in India.

== Revived ==
Perfumes of Singapore was re-registered in 2016 by Prachi Saini Garg of Singapore Memories and have started selling Reves De Singapour and Singapore Girl again.

== Brands sold under Perfumes of Singapore ==
- Australian Girl
- Singapore Girl 1970's and revived in 2016
- California Girl
- Hawaii Girl
- Hong Kong Girl
- Bali
- Javanesque
- Cinta
- Dadi 7
- First Lady
- Christina
- May Ling
- Reves De Singapour old and new launched in 2017
- Singapore Bliss
- Character Perfume – The Group launched a series of perfume which were based on Astrological symbols. There is no name for these, just symbols. The series was insured for $70 million in 1985 by Lloyd's London

Besides perfumes, the brand also manufactured soap and bath oils.

== Awards ==
- Best design and packaging, Singapore Manufacturers Association (1997)
