= The Street with No Name =

1948 film by William Keighley

- Theatrical release poster
- Directed by: William Keighley
- Written by: Harry Kleiner; Samuel G. Engel (contract writer; uncredited)
- Produced by: Samuel G. Engel
- Starring: Mark Stevens; Richard Widmark; Lloyd Nolan; Barbara Lawrence
- Cinematography: Joseph MacDonald
- Edited by: William H. Reynolds
- Music by: Lionel Newman
- Distributed by: Twentieth Century-Fox
- Release date: July 14, 1948 (United States)
- Running time: 91 minutes
- Country: United States
- Language: English
- Box office: $2,350,000 (US rentals)

The Street with No Name is a 1948 American film noir directed by William Keighley. A follow-up to The House on 92nd Street (1945), it tells the story of an undercover FBI agent, Gene Cordell (Mark Stevens), who infiltrates a deadly crime gang. Cordell's superior, FBI Inspector George A. Briggs (Lloyd Nolan), also appears in The House on 92nd Street. The film, shot in a semidocumentary style, takes place in the Skid Row section of fictional (actually Los Angeles) "Center City".

== Plot ==
A crime wave, including a holdup at a nightclub that ends in a murder and a bank robbery in which a guard is killed, has hit Center City. A squad of FBI agents headed by inspector George A. Briggs meets with local FBI field officer Richard Atkins, police chief Bernard Harmatz and Police Commissioner Ralph Demory. After Briggs interrogates suspect Robert Danker, who claims he was not involved in either killing and that he has been framed, various tests are run at the FBI laboratory in Washington that exonerate Danker. Later Danker, who has been bailed out by "John Smith", is found stabbed to death. At the FBI Academy in Quantico, Virginia, Briggs briefs agent Gene Cordell, who is going undercover in Center City to try to infiltrate the gang Briggs thinks is responsible for all three killings. Cordell takes a bus into Center City and rents a room at the same "Skid Row" hotel in which Danker had been living. Fellow agent Cy Gordon is in a similar hotel across the street. Using the name George Manly, Cordell makes himself known in the area by going to the local gym and picking a fight with one of the boxers training there. He is spotted by owner Alec Stiles, who offers him cash if he can last against the boxer. He does, and Alec pays him off.

Later, in a nearby amusement arcade, Cordell tells Gordon that while he was at the gym, his Social Security card was stolen. As they talk, two policemen approach and arrest Cordell for a break-in at a jewelry store, where his card has been found. The FBI has provided a false record for Cordell, and he is bailed out by "John Smith", who turns out to be Stiles. Through the police department, Stiles has acquired a copy of Cordell's phony FBI record and is impressed enough to invite him to join his organization. Later Cordell meets with Briggs on board a ferry, and his report convinces Briggs that the Stiles gang are their culprits. After Stiles and his henchmen plan a robbery of a local mansion, Stiles has a violent argument with his wife Judy. Cordell alerts Gordon about the robbery and the FBI and police prepare an ambush, but Stiles' informant within the police department tips him off and he cancels the job. Cordell returns to gang headquarters and fires a shot from Stiles' Luger pistol in order to recover the bullet for testing. However, Stiles discovers that his gun has been fired and goes to see his informant, who turns out to be Commissioner Demory, and asks him to have his gun checked for fingerprints. Demory later advises Stiles that his gang has been infiltrated by Cordell.

Shivvy and Matty, two of Stiles' henchmen, take Cordell to see Stiles, and Gordon follows them in a taxi. Briggs, who has been observing Stiles and can link him to Demory, then receives a report from Washington that the barrel markings on the bullet fired from Stiles' gun are identical with those on the bullets used in the previous killings. After Gordon tracks Shivvy, Matty and Cordell to a factory, he tells the taxi driver to get word to Briggs as to where he is. Inside the plant, Shivvy discovers and then stabs Gordon. Cordell does not realize he has been found out until Stiles announces he is going to frame him and have Demory's officers "accidentally" kill him. However, the plan backfires when Briggs and Chief Harmatz arrive with backup and chase Stiles through the factory. Cordell corners Stiles and kills him, and as Briggs arrests Demory, agent Gordon is seen to not be in life-threatening condition.

== Cast ==
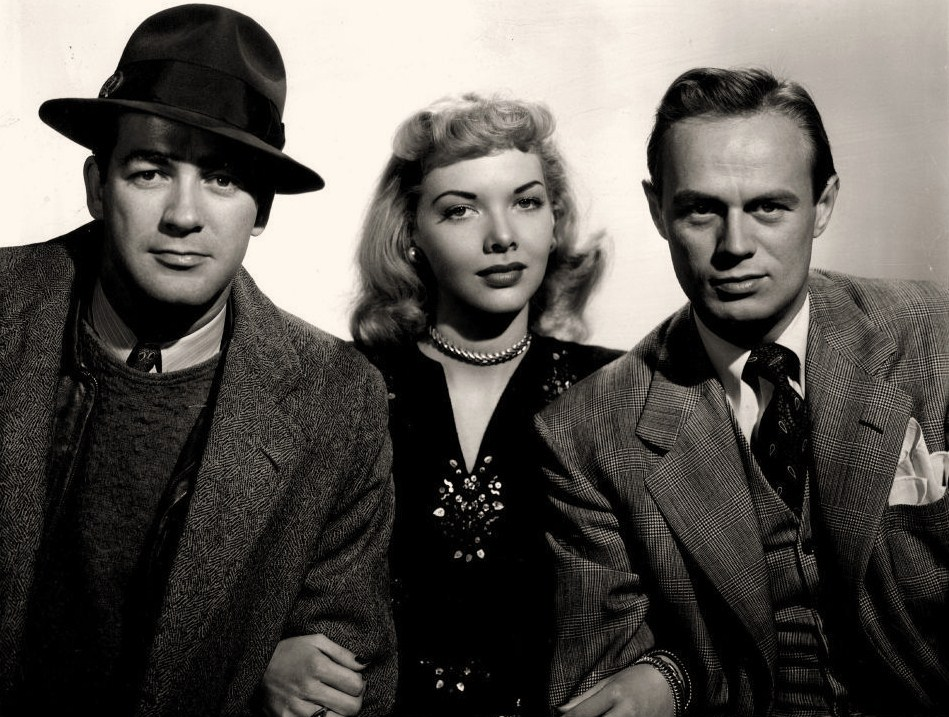
Mark Stevens, Barbara Lawrence and Richard Widmark in The Street with No Name

- Mark Stevens as Gene Cordell/George Manly
- Richard Widmark as Alec Stiles
- Lloyd Nolan as FBI Insp. George A. Briggs
- Barbara Lawrence as Judy Stiles
- Ed Begley as Police Chief Bernard Harmatz
- Donald Buka as Shivvy
- Joseph Pevney as Matty
- John McIntire as Cy Gordon
- Howard Smith as Commissioner Demory

== Production ==
The role of Judy Stiles was offered to June Haver, but she turned it down, calling it an "unimportant role". She furthermore said: "After playing that role, I won't have any name". As a result, she was put on suspension by Fox.

== Reception ==
=== Critical response ===
When the film was released the staff at Variety magazine wrote, "A double-barreled gangster film, The Street with No Name ranks at the top of the list of documentary-type productions which have been rolling out of the 20th-Fox lot. This pic has a lean, tough surface wrapped around a nucleus of explosive violence. Beneath its documentary exterior there lies a straight melodrama that harks back to the great gangster films of the early 1930s...Along a continuous line of fresh details, film includes a crackerjack fight sequence between Stevens and a professional pug, a glimpse into the FBI machinery, and a slambang finale in which the cops and the hoodlums shoot it out in an industrial plant. In a secondary role, Lloyd Nolan, playing the same Inspector Briggs of the FBI of The House on 92nd Street, delivers with his usual competence."

More recently, critic Dennis Schwartz wrote, "William Keighley (Bullets or Ballots/G Men) ably directs in a no-nonsense manner this semi-documentary styled crime drama, while Harry Kleiner provides the taut script; it follows in the authentically atmospheric territory carved out by The House on 92nd Street (1945). The film noir gets its colorful flavorings from star Richard Widmark playing another psychopathic killer like he did in Kiss of Death...The film's main purpose is to tell in an entertaining fashion how efficient the FBI is and how dangerous is their work. But the film is well-acted, has terrific shadowy visuals courtesy of Joe MacDonald, frighteningly conveys the feeling of a corrupt city, and never pretends to be anything more arty than a good cops and robbers action film. On those merits, it's watchable."

=== Accolades ===
Nominations

- Writers Guild of America: WGA Award (Screen); The Robert Meltzer Award, Screenplay Dealing Most Ably with Problems of the American Scene, Harry Kleiner; 1949.

== Remake ==
Harry Kleiner's screenplay was reworked seven years later for Samuel Fuller's House of Bamboo (1955).
