= When the Girls Take Over =

1960 film by Russell Hayden

- Original film poster
- Directed by: Russell Hayden
- Written by: Samuel Roeca
- Produced by: Russell Hayden
- Starring: Marvin Miller; Jackie Coogan; Robert Lowery
- Narrated by: John Conte
- Cinematography: Arthur E. Arling
- Music by: Ben Oakland; Howard Jackson (conductor)
- Production company: Trans-Oceanic Productions
- Distributed by: Parade Releasing Organization
- Release date: May 1962
- Running time: 79 min.
- Country: United States
- Language: English

When the Girls Take Over is an American men's adventure comedy film produced and directed by Russell Hayden and starring Marvin Miller, Jackie Coogan, and Robert Lowery. Inspired by the Cuban Revolution, it was filmed in Puerto Rico in 1960 under the working title Caribe and released in 1962. The film was shot in color, but the public domain copy is in black and white.

== Plot ==
The film begins with shots of the United Nations Headquarters in New York City as a narrator quotes Genesis 11 about the Tower of Babel. The scene switches inside the UN with the delegate from the Republic of Hondo Rico being interrupted by Nikita Khrushchev recreating his shoe-banging incident. The Hondo Rican delegate revenges himself by stalking Khrushchev to an empty hallway and knocking him out with a shoe.

The easy-going Republic of Hondo Rico is a former French colony in the Caribbean menaced by an insurgency led by a Fidel Castro type bearded revolutionary general named Maximo Toro (translation: a lot of bull). The main impediment to Maximo's plan is lack of money and weapons.

The legal regime of Hondo Rico also faces a lack of wealth with First Minister Henri Degiere and his aide de camp Captain Toussaint running a Hondo Rican trade fair with a variety of attractive women to lure the United States government or private investors to support the nation through their industry of manufacturing various items out of sugar cane by-products. The only interested party is wealthy Texan millionaire Axel "Longhorn" Gates. During the trade fair Henri hires a pair of Americans Steve and Stoney to fly some cargo and diving gear down to Hondo Rico. Steve and Stoney have a CLASS (Caribbean Land And Sea Service) import-export business consisting of a decrepit Catalina flying boat named "Caribe" and a local mechanic named Razmo.

Back in Hondo Rico, when Maximo is not intimidating his guerilla band (Maximo has the only functioning weapon) he enjoys the company of the Henri's daughter Francoise as his lover. Maximo schemes a plan where he gets word to Henri that he has kidnapped Francoise and will kill her unless he delivers several crates of government rifles (actually children's versions of Kadet M1903 Springfield silver-plated drill rifles). Henri and Toussaint beat the slow flying Catalina back to Hondo Rico and steal several crates of weapons from the Hondo Rican army. Taking the weapons by boat, they panic when they arrive at Maximo's basecamp dumping the crates into the ocean just offshore of the guerilla base.

Knowing the two American soldiers of fortune have diving gear, he enlists their aide to recover the weapons. In the meantime, Longhorn Gates has arrived in the nation and decides to recruit every beautiful woman on the island to launch a sexy assault on Maximo's guerillas.

== Cast ==
- Marvin Miller ... Henri Degiere
- Robert Lowery ... Maximo Toro
- Jackie Coogan ... Captain Toussaint
- James Ellison ... Axel 'Longhorn' Gates
- Ingeborg Kjeldsen ... Francoise Degiere
- Jeffrey Stone ... Steve Harding
- Don Dorrell ... Stoney Jackson
- Tommy Cook ... Razmo
- True Ellison ... Melesa
- Gabriel Dell ... "Major" Henderson
- Paul Bailey ... Clutch
- Luis de Tejada ... Jeep Driver
- Yanka Mann ... Chiquita
- Fabiola Brown ... Bonita
