= Forbidden (1953 film) =

1953 film by Rudolph Maté

- Film poster by Reynold Brown
- Directed by: Rudolph Maté
- Screenplay by: William Sackheim; Gil Doud
- Story by: William Sackheim
- Produced by: Ted Richmond
- Starring: Tony Curtis; Joanne Dru; Lyle Bettger
- Cinematography: William H. Daniels
- Edited by: Edward Curtiss
- Music by: Frank Skinner
- Color process: Black and white
- Production company: Universal Pictures
- Distributed by: Universal Pictures
- Release date: December 2, 1953
- Running time: 85 minutes
- Country: United States
- Language: English

Forbidden is a 1953 American film noir crime film directed by Rudolph Maté and starring Tony Curtis, Joanne Dru and Lyle Bettger.

== Plot ==
Eddie Darrow (Tony Curtis) works for American gangster Barney Pendleton, who sends him to Macao to find a woman, Christine Lawrence, and bring her back to the United States. Aware of a previous romantic attraction between the two, Pendleton tells his thug Chalmer to follow Eddie on the trip, just in case.

At a nightclub and casino, Eddie saves the owner, Justin Keit, from some Chinese men attacking him. A grateful Justin invites him home and introduces Eddie to his fiancée, Christine. Eddie is bitter because Christine had run off to marry a criminal named Manard, who is now dead. A jealous Justin overhears Christine explain to Eddie that she only wed Manard because he threatened to harm Eddie. She also says Pendleton wants her back because she has hidden documents that could land him behind bars.

In order to keep an eye on Eddie, Justin offers him a job at the casino. There he befriends an Asian piano player named Allan. A local gambler named Hon-Fai is robbed and killed, and Eddie suspects Justin could be behind this. Christine makes it clear she does not love Justin, and she and Eddie passionately kiss. Chalmer shows himself, suspecting that Eddie has decided to take Christine for himself and flee. Eddie denies this, claiming that he fully intends to follow Pendleton's orders and bring Christine back to the States. Christine overhears this and angrily decides to marry Justin.

As a gang war breaks out, Chalmer is killed and Justin does indeed turn out to be a ruthless criminal. Allan, the pianist, reveals himself to be an undercover agent of the law. He is able to get Eddie and Christine on board a boat leaving for San Francisco, and when Justin tries to pursue them, he ends up on a boat that explodes.

== Cast ==
- Tony Curtis as Eddie
- Joanne Dru as Christine
- Lyle Bettger as Justin
- Marvin Miller as Chalmer
- Victor Sen Yung as Allan
- Peter Mamakos as Sam (as Peter J. Mamakos)
- Mai Tai Sing as Soo Lee (as Mae Tai Sing)
- Howard Chuman as Hon-Fai
- Weaver Levy as Tang

== See also ==
- List of American films of 1953
