= Mai Tai Sing =

American actress

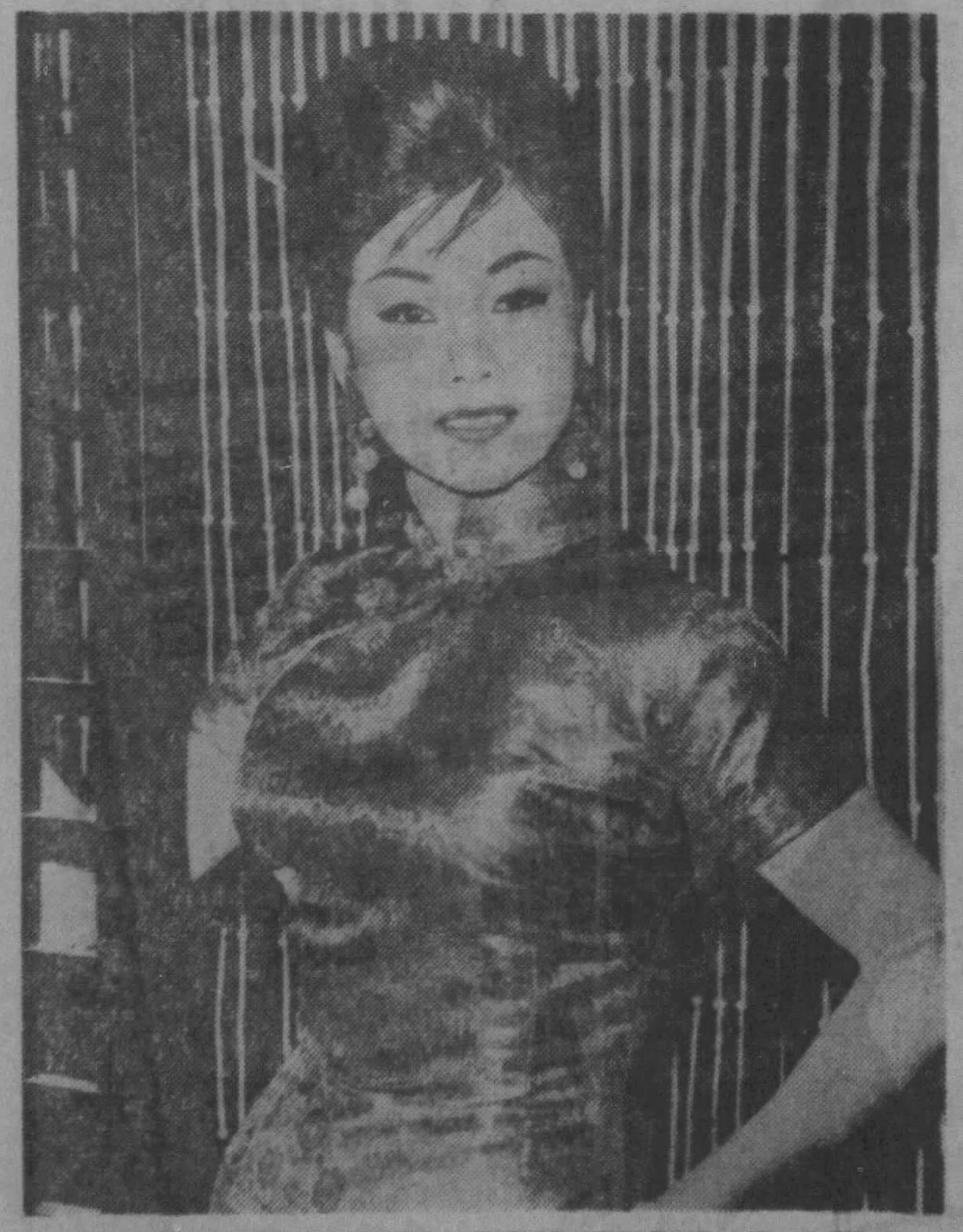
- Sing c. 1960
- Born: May Tsang; December 22, 1923; Oakland, California, U.S.
- Died: July 11, 2018 (aged 94); Hawaii, U.S.
- Occupation: Actress
- Years active: 1953–2018
- Spouse: Wilbur Tai Sing
- Children: 2

Mai Tai Sing
- Simplified Chinese: 梅蒂仙
Transcriptions
Standard Mandarin
- Hanyu Pinyin: Méi Dìxiān

Mai Tai Sing (December 22, 1923 – July 11, 2018) was an American actress and businesswoman. Her acting credits include the TV series Hong Kong, Forbidden, and Strange Portrait.

== Background ==
She was born in Oakland, California as May Tsang. Most of her young years were in Hong Kong. When she was about fourteen, she and her family moved back to the California Bay area. One of her early jobs was waitressing at the Forbidden City nightclub. It was there she became interested in performing.

In the early 1940s, she became a chorus girl there. She met Wilbur and Jessie Tai Sing, a dancing duo. Later she replaced Jessie. By 1942, she was married to Wilbur Tai Sing and had two children to him.

In the 1960s she became romantically involved with actor Jeffrey Hunter. An article in The Milwaukee Sentinel said that they were to be married. At this time they had been working together in the film Strange Portrait. In the 1970s she relocated to Hawaii.

== Film and television roles ==
=== Film ===
In 1953, she appeared in a film with Tony Curtis, playing the part of Soo Lee. Forbidden was directed by Rudolph Maté. Other cast included Joanne Dru and Victor Sen Yung. Her last film role was in the ill-fated Strange Portrait that starred Jeffery Hunter. In this film she played a wealthy but reclusive and insane woman living alone in a mansion who has an obsession with a portrait of her husband that had abandoned her.

=== Television ===
In the 1950s she appeared in two episodes of The New Adventures of China Smith a.k.a. The Affairs of China Smith which was an action/adventure series about an American adventurer living in Singapore. The main role was played by Dan Duryea. In the early 1960s had a recurring role as Ching Mei in the series Hong Kong. She played the owner of The Golden Dragon, a supper club. The cast included Rod Taylor and Lloyd Bochner.

She would also host Charlie Chan films on channel 44, a local San Francisco television station.

== Club management ==
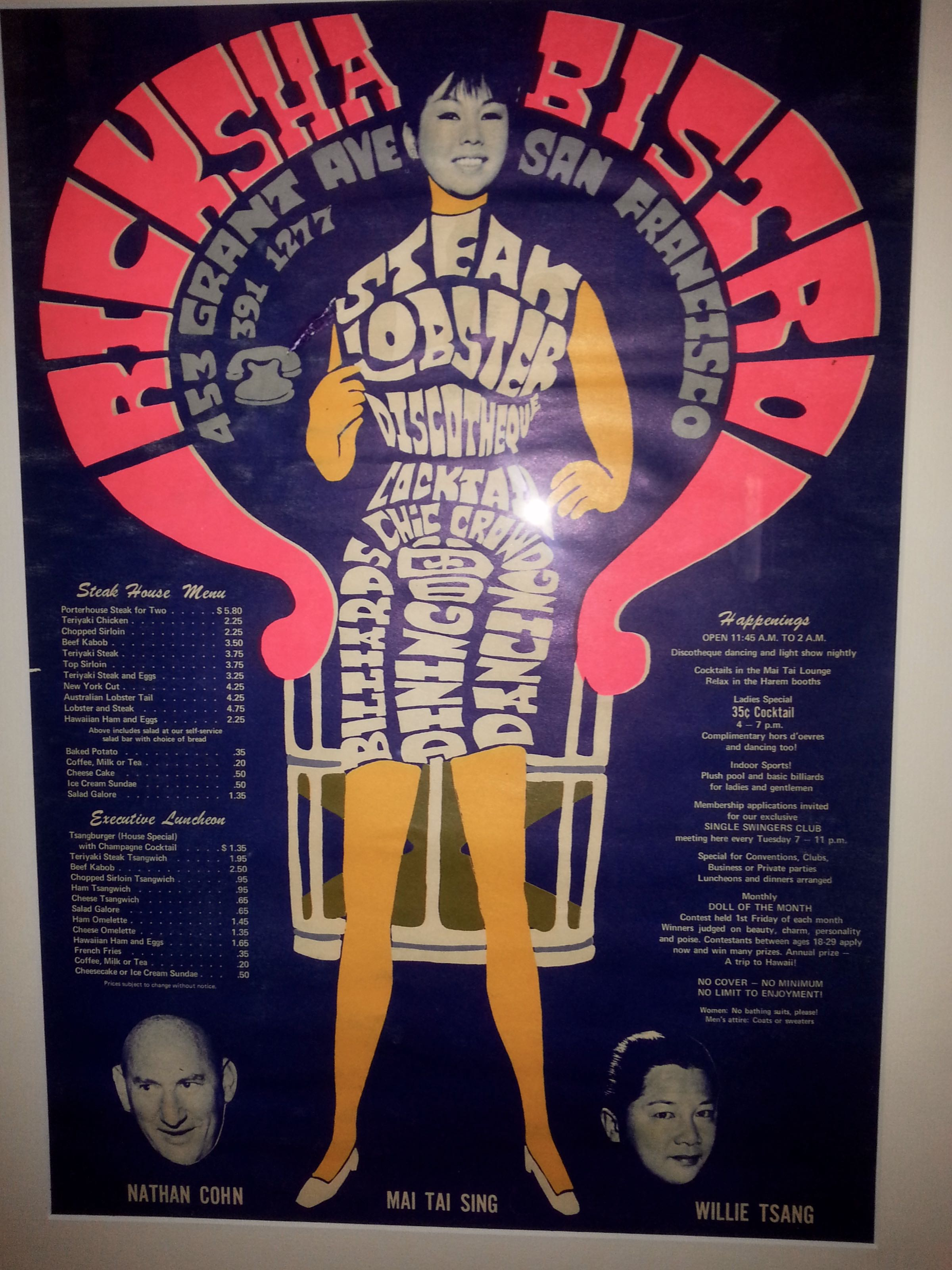
Advertising poster for Ricksha Bistro in San Francisco

She had an association with clubs that goes back to the 1940s as a chorus girl, she would eventually end up in management. One of the clubs that she ran was The Rickshaw in San Francisco. That club is known for a night when John Lennon, Ringo Starr and Billy Preston stopped by.

She moved to Hawaii in the 1970s. Another club she managed was "Trappers", located in the Hyatt Waikiki. The club featured the Betty Loo Taylor Trio. She was hostess and manager there until her retirement in 2003 at age 79. Her retirement marked 28 years of management and hosting at Trappers and later at the Ciao Mein.

== Filmography ==
=== Television ===
- Jake and the Fatman, Eipisode: "Chinatown, My Chinatown" (1990) ... Hostess
- Hawaii Five-O, Episode: "Wooden Model of a Rat" (1975) ... Reporter #2
- Sam Benedict Episode: "Nothing Equals Nothing" ... Lily Sin
- Hong Kong, Episode: "The Runaway" (1961) ... Ching Mei
- Hong Kong, Episode: "Murder by Proxy" (1961) ... Ching Mei
- Hong Kong, Episode: "With Deadly Sorrow" (1961) ... Ching Mei
- Hong Kong, Episode: "The Hunted" (1961) ... Ching Mei
- Hong Kong, Episode: "Lesson in Fear" (1961) ... Ching Mei
- Hong Kong, Episode: "Suitable for Framing" (1961) ... Ching Mei
- The New Adventures of China Smith Episode: "The Black Wings of the Fire Bird" (1954) ... Moonflower
- The New Adventures of China Smith Episode: "The Talons of Tongking" (1954) ... Ah Chee

=== Film ===
- The Golden Horde (1951) ... Dancer
- Forbidden (1953) ... Soo Lee
- Strange Portrait (1966)
- Forbidden City U.S.A (1988) ... Archival footage

== Links ==
- Mai Tai Sing Historical Essay
- Mai Tai Sing at IMDb
