= The Thing That Couldn't Die =

1958 horror film

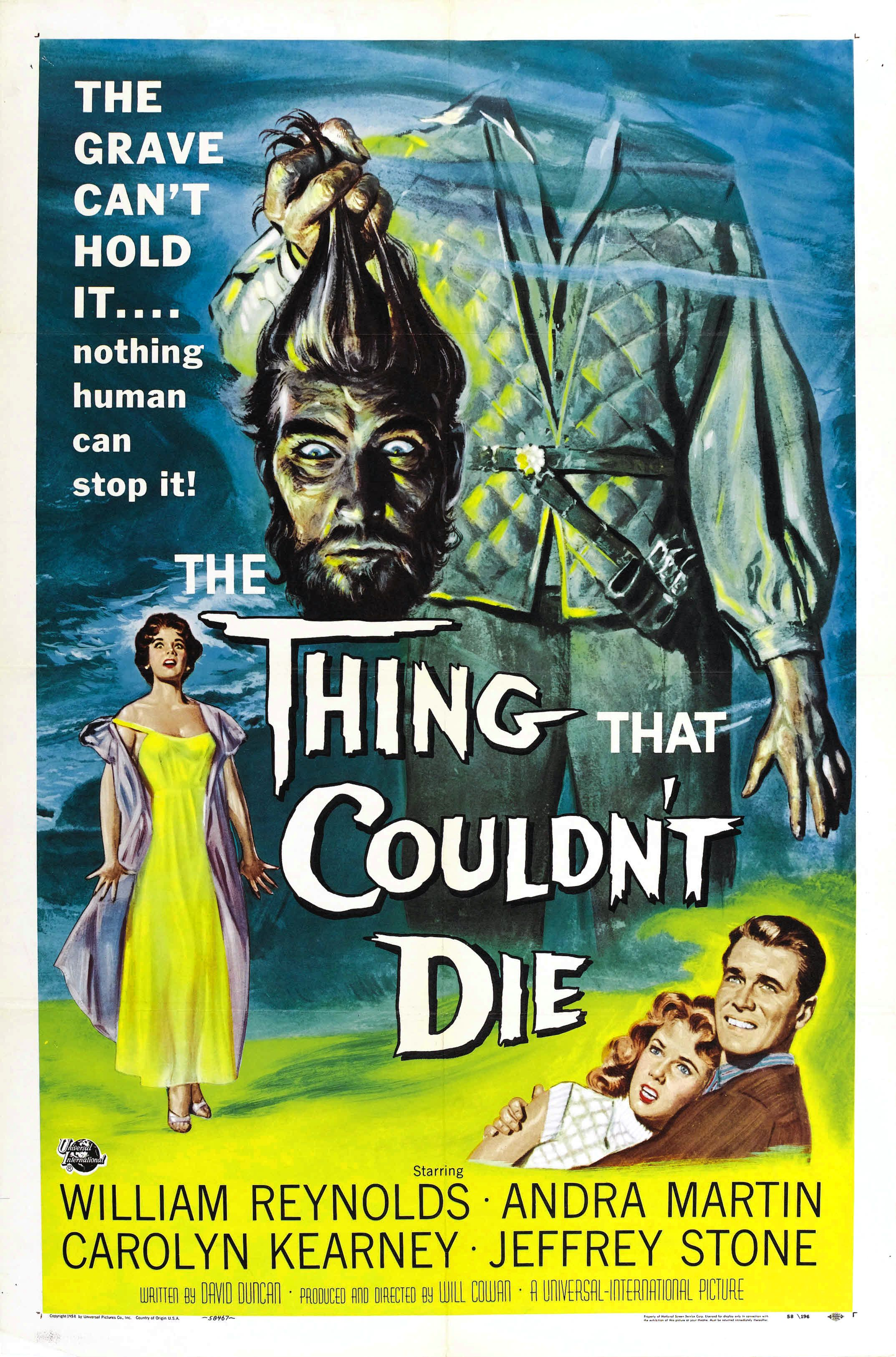
- Original film poster
- Directed by: Will Cowan
- Written by: David Duncan
- Produced by: Will Cowan
- Starring: William Reynolds; Andra Martin; Jeffrey Stone; Carolyn Kearney
- Cinematography: Russell Metty
- Edited by: Edward Curtiss
- Music by: Henry Mancini
- Color process: Black and White
- Production company: Universal Pictures
- Distributed by: Universal Pictures
- Release date: May 8, 1958 (US)
- Running time: 69 minutes
- Country: United States
- Language: English

The Thing That Couldn't Die is a 1958 American horror film about a man executed for sorcery 400 years in the past whose detached head hypnotizes people in order to have them reunite his head with his body so that he can live and feast on the blood of present-day people. It was produced and directed by Will Cowan and starred William Reynolds, Andra Martin, Jeffrey Stone, and Carolyn Kearney. Based on an original screenplay by David Duncan for Universal Pictures, it was released in the United States on a double bill with the British Hammer Films classic Horror of Dracula in May 1958.

== Plot ==
Jessica Burns (Carolyn Kearney), a young woman who claims to have psychic powers, lives on a California dude ranch with her Aunt Flavia (Peggy Converse). When Jessica is called upon to dowse in search of a groundwater spring, she instead discovers a buried box dating from the 16th century. Against Jessica's warnings, Flavia takes the box back to her house. Flavia, consumed with thoughts of buried treasure, wants to open the box immediately. But Gordon Hawthorne (William Reynolds), a guest at the ranch who has shown interest in Jessica, argues the box should be kept intact for appraisal. That night, he leaves the ranch to bring an archaeologist friend to inspect the box.

However, Flavia's greedy ranch foreman, Boyd, also anticipating treasure, secretly convinces slow-witted handyman Mike to break the cask open. Instead of gold or gemstones, the box contains the intact head of Gideon Drew (Robin Hughes), a man executed for sorcery 400 years earlier. The head awakens and telepathically controls Mike.

Drew's head commands Mike to murder Boyd, then has the handyman conceal it while arranging to have a coffin retrieved containing Drew's body. The head takes control of Linda (Andra Martin), another ranch guest. She places the head in a hat box inside a guest room closet. Flavia and Jessica discover Boyd's body and call the police.

Gordon and his archaeologist acquaintance, Julian Ash, arrive back at the ranch. Mike, still apparently under Drew's control, approaches the police officers in a threatening manner holding the knife that killed Boyd. The officers shoot him dead.

Once his head and body are joined, Drew will be able to fully exercise his powers, though his plan is not entirely clear. Jessica senses the evil and is protected from the head's influence by a fleur-de-lis amulet she wears around her neck. But when Gordon removes the amulet so its historical value could be appraised, Drew's head assumes control of her mind.

Reading text engraved on the box's corroded metal surface, Julian and Gordon discover the existence of a coffin also buried on the property that contains Drew's body. Under Drew's control, Jessica and Linda retrieve the head, while Gordon, Julian, and ranch guest Hank dig up the casket.

The coffin is opened inside the house, and Jessica reunites the head to its body. Drew arises from his coffin and threatens to feast on the blood of the ranch's modern residents. Gordon, somehow aware of the amulet's power, catches the monster off guard and thrusts the necklace toward Drew. This forces Drew back into the coffin and, when the fleur-de-lis is tossed in with his body, the group watches the total disintegration of his mortal remains.

== Cast ==
- William Reynolds as Gordon Hawthorne
- Andra Martin as Linda Madison
- Jeffrey Stone as Hank Huston
- Carolyn Kearney as Jessica Burns
- Peggy Converse as Flavia McIntyre
- Robin Hughes as Gideon Drew
- James Anderson as Boyd Abercrombie
- Charles Horvath as Mike
- Forrest Lewis as Julian Ash

== Legacy ==
The Thing That Couldn't Die has been featured on the television program Svengoolie, with the episode with The Thing That Couldn't Die first aired on March 6, 2021, and again on March 8, 2025. The movie was also included in the Shout Factory Blu-ray release Universal Horror Collection: Volume 6.

=== Mystery Science Theater 3000 ===
The film was the subject of episode #805 of Mystery Science Theater 3000, which first aired on the Sci-Fi Channel on March 1, 1997. The episode featured the show's first appearance of the Observers, an omniscient race of pale-faced aliens who carry their brains around in dishes. In contrast to the all-knowing Observers, MST3K writer Paul Chaplin, who also appeared as one of the Observers, notes the characters in The Thing That Couldn't Die are unusually uniformly dumb, standing out even in a series that featured movies with very unintelligent characters. "Every character in this movie," he writes, "each in his own special way, is stupid, including the evil Englishman (the guy who couldn't die who dies) and the dim fellows who originally cursed and buried him. Am I being unfair? No.".

Paste writer Jim Vorel ranked the episode highly, calling it "underrated" and placing it at #32 out of 191 MST3K episodes from the first twelve seasons. Vorel called the character Jessica "one of the more delightfully clueless and poorly acted characters in MST3K history." Additionally, Vorel writes, the movie seems "deliberately crafted to be riffed, with plotting so lackadasical and full of holes that it just begs for commentary."

Shout! Factory included the episode on the MST3K: Volume XXIX DVD box set. The set, released on March 25, 2014, had a bonus feature, "The Movie That Couldn’t Die," a nine-minute short on the making of the movie. The box set also included three other episodes: Untamed Youth (episode #112), The Pumaman (episode (#903), and Hercules and the Captive Women (episode #412).
