= Christina Balsara =

Singaporean businesswoman (1923–2009)

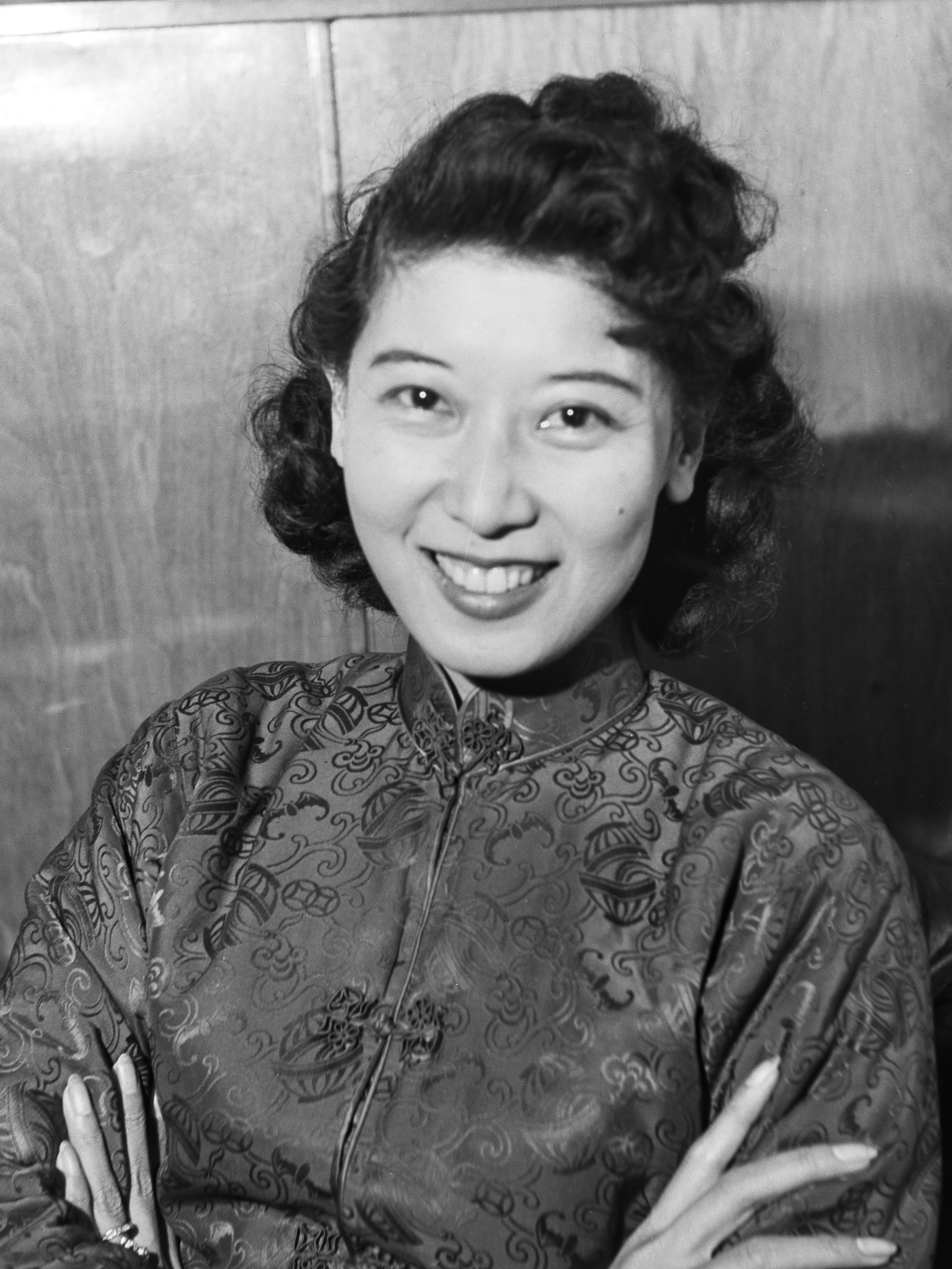
- Balsara in 1958
- Born: Christina Lee; 1923; Singapore
- Died: 2009 (aged 85–86)
- Other name: Christina Stone
- Occupation: Businesswoman
- Employer: Perfumes of Singapore
- Spouse(s): Loke Wan Tho 1950 (m. 1962, divorced) Jeffrey Stone (m. 1965; div. 1972) Dadi Balsara (m. 1970)
- Father: Lee Chong Miow

Christina Balsara (née Lee; 1923 – 2009) was a Singaporean businesswoman. She co-founded Perfumes of the Orient (Perfumes of Singapore Pte Ltd) and Singapore Girl perfume.

== Early life ==
Her father was Lee Chong Miow, the head of Lee and Fletcher Co, Singapore Photo Co. There are some differing versions of her early life. One is that she came from a humble background, later entered a beauty competition and was noticed by her future husband Loke Wan Tho. Hers was that her grandfather was a judge and her father wasn't happy with his childhood and left to become a photographer who went to Borneo, traveled with Verner Brook and then ended up settling in Singapore which was where she was born.

== Career ==
In 1957 she made a presentation at the Odeon Theatre in Singapore to the winners of a rock'n'roll competition that was in conjunction with the screening of the film Love Me Tender. The winners of the competition were presented with the Elvis Presley cup and the Platters cup. The competition was to aid a children's fund.

In February 1962, her husband, Loke Wan Tho, petitioned for divorce on the grounds of cruelty. She cross-petitioned on the same grounds. The lurid details came out in court and were reported by the Press. Upon the satisfaction of the Chief Justice of Singapore, Sir Alan Rose, in the two day hearing, that there had been mutual cruelty inflicted upon each party by the other, the divorce was granted on 15 Feb 1962 and finalised three months later.

In 1962, Lee and American actor Jeffrey Stone co-founded the company Perfumes of the Orient, with production factories were based in Jurong and Petaling Jaya, Malaysia.

In 1965 she appeared in Vogue magazine as one of Singapore's most beautiful women.

In 1966, she became involved in her husband Jeffrey Stone's ill-fated film project, Strange Portrait, which was never released. She had a role in the film playing a ballet dancer. In 1967, she opened Sarong Island which was a tourist isle on a 5-acre island that she owned. Jeffrey Stone said the name sarong was chosen as it was an easy word for Westerners to remember.

In 1971, the Sarong Island, along with a plot of land on Sentosa that was also owned by Lee was acquired by the Singaporean Government.

Dadi Balsara helped rebrand her perfume business to Perfumes of Singapore Pte Ltd. As a businesswoman she was chair of Perfumes of Singapore.

In 1977 she and her husband launched the Singapore Girl perfume which did well at department stores and hotels. It was popular with tourists and was sold on the planes of Singapore Airlines. It received the Singapore Manufacturers Association's top prize for its design and packing in 1977.

After the Himalayan natural mineral water brand was sold to the TATA group in 2007, the couple lived at the Taj Mansingh, New Delhi.

In 2008, Perfumes of Singapore closed down after Dadi Balsara secured support from the Indian government to undertake large scale projects in India.

== Personal life ==
Lee was married three times. In 1950, Lee married Loke Wan Tho and divorced in 1962. In 1965, Lee married Jeffrey Stone and by 1972, she divorced from Stone.

Her last marriage was to Parsi businessman, Dadi Balsara, who is the founder and owner of Mount Everest Mineral Water Limited, in the 1970s.

== Death ==
Christina Balsara died in 2009 at age 86, while Dadi Balsara died of illness in 2016.
