= Army Bound =

1952 film

- Theatrical release poster
- Directed by: Paul Landres
- Screenplay by: Al Martin
- Produced by: Ben Schwalb
- Starring: Stanley Clements; Karen Sharpe; Steve Brodie; Jeffrey Stone; Harry Hayden; Lela Bliss; Gil Stratton
- Cinematography: Harry Neumann
- Edited by: Bruce Schoengarth
- Music by: Marlin Skiles
- Production company: Monogram Pictures
- Distributed by: Monogram Pictures
- Release date: October 5, 1952
- Running time: 61 minutes
- Country: United States
- Language: English

Army Bound is a 1952 American drama film directed by Paul Landres, written by Al Martin and starring Stanley Clements, Karen Sharpe, Steve Brodie, Jeffrey Stone, Harry Hayden, Lela Bliss and Gil Stratton. The film was released on October 5, 1952 by Monogram Pictures.

== Cast ==
- Stanley Clements as Frank Cermak
- Karen Sharpe as Jane Harris
- Steve Brodie as Matt Hall
- Jeffrey Stone as Lt. Peters
- Harry Hayden as Mr. Harris
- Lela Bliss as Mrs. Harris
- Gil Stratton as Burt
- Murray Alper as Military Police Sergeant
- Danny Welton as Steve
- Mona Knox as Gladys
- Jean Dean as Hortense
- Carey Loftin as Duke Horner
- Louis Tomei as Herb Turner
- Joey Ray as George
- Larry Stewart as Doug
- Steve Wayne as Sergeant
- Lisa Wilson as Waitress
- Carleton Young as Doctor
- Roy Gordon as Minister
- Bob Cudlip as Motorcycle Policeman

== See also ==
- Navy Bound
