= House of Bamboo =

1955 film by Samuel Fuller

- Theatrical release poster
- Directed by: Samuel Fuller
- Screenplay by: Harry Kleiner; Samuel Fuller
- Based on: The Street with No Name (1948 film) by Harry Kleiner
- Produced by: Buddy Adler
- Starring: Robert Ryan; Robert Stack; Shirley Yamaguchi; Cameron Mitchell
- Cinematography: Joseph MacDonald
- Edited by: James B. Clark
- Music by: Leigh Harline
- Production company: 20th Century Fox
- Distributed by: 20th Century Fox
- Release dates: July 1, 1955 (New York City); July 13, 1955 (Los Angeles)
- Running time: 102 minutes
- Country: United States
- Language: English
- Budget: $1,380,000
- Box office: $1.7 million (US)

House of Bamboo is a 1955 American film noir directed by Samuel Fuller, from a screenplay co-written with Harry Kleiner, and starring Robert Ryan, Robert Stack, Yoshiko Yamaguchi (credited as 'Shirley Yamaguchi'), Cameron Mitchell, and Sessue Hayakawa.

Set and principally filmed on-location in Japan, it follows an undercover American agent (Stack) infiltrating a gang of ex-American servicemen operating in Tokyo. The screenplay is an uncredited reworking of the 1948 film The Street with No Name (1948).

The film was released by 20th Century Fox on July 1, 1955.

== Plot ==
In the winter in post-second world war Japan, a military train guarded by American soldiers and Japanese police is robbed of its cargo of guns, ammunition, and smoke bombs. During the robbery, a U.S. Army sergeant guarding the train is shot and killed. Five weeks later, a thief named Webber lies dying in a Tokyo hospital, shot by one of his own cohorts during a holdup in which smoke bombs were used. Army investigators discover Webber was shot by the same P38 pistol that killed the sergeant during the train robbery. Webber is questioned by U.S Army Captain Hanson and Japanese Police Inspector Kita. Discovered among Webber's possessions is a letter from an American named Eddie Spanier, who wants to join Webber in Japan after his release from a U.S. prison. Though Webber refuses to implicate his fellow gang members, he does reveal that he is secretly married to a Japanese woman named Mariko Nagoya.

Three weeks later, Eddie arrives in Tokyo and makes contact with a fearful Mariko, gaining her trust with a photograph of himself taken with Webber, and learns about Webber's death. Mariko admits that Webber made her swear to keep their marriage a secret; she did not know about his criminal life and never sought help from the police as this would have exposed her marriage. Later, Eddie goes to a pachinko parlor and successfully shakes down the manager. However, on his second attempt at a different parlor, he is beaten by a group of Americans led by racketeer Sandy Dawson. Sandy is so intrigued with Eddie's audacity, and his significant criminal background, that he later arranges for him to join his gang of disgruntled former American servicemen who have been dishonorably discharged. After being accepted into the gang, Sandy orders Eddie to buy some new clothes to look presentable and to return immediately after.

While out getting new clothes, Eddie secretly meets with Captain Hanson and Inspector Kita, for whom he is actually working undercover. During the meeting, Eddie raises concerns that police information is being leaked to Sandy. On return to Sandy's home, Eddie is questioned as to his whereabouts and why he took so long to buy new clothes. Out of excuses, Eddie insists he was on "private business" and leads Sandy to Mariko's home, where Sandy's men violently break in and assault Mariko's uncle, while Sandy questions Mariko. Mariko initially denies any involvement with Eddie, but is forced to vouch for Eddie after he slaps her. Sandy and his men leave, while Mariko and her uncle follow Eddie to his home.

Mariko apologises to Eddie for not vouching for him earlier and offers to help him, admitting that she is frightened for him. To solidify his cover, Eddie asks Mariko to live with him as his "kimono girl." Also hoping to discover who killed Webber, Mariko consents to Eddie's offer, and the two slowly begin to fall in love. However, Mariko is shunned by the public for sleeping in the same home as a foreign man while unmarried. In the meantime, Eddie participates in a robbery in Tokyo Bay planned by Sandy, incidentally remarking at the P38 pistol that Sandy uses. Eventually, Sandy grows to trust Eddie and even orders his second in command Griff to save Eddie's life when Eddie is wounded during the robbery, surprisingly disregarding his own rule to shoot wounded gang members and leave them for dead. Sandy goes as far as to invite Eddie to stay at his house to recover, with Mariko to nurse him back to health.

Eddie finally informs Mariko of his real identity – he is actually U.S. Army Sergeant Edward Kenner and is working as an undercover infiltrator into the Dawson gang. Mariko pledges to continue to assist Eddie in his investigation. However, during a party hosted by Sandy, Griff makes it clear he is becoming increasingly jealous and irritable that Sandy is showing favoritism to Eddie. Griff's hot temper causes Sandy to order him to sit out the next robbery, which will target an armored vehicle at an intersection outside the Bank of Tokyo. Eddie tasks Mariko to deliver a message to Captain Hanson, detailing the planned heist. Unfortunately, Mariko is seen by Charlie, one of Sandy's men, meeting with Hanson at the Imperial Hotel and is assumed to be cheating on Eddie. Charlie informs Sandy of this, who violently intimidates Mariko for cheating on Eddie and orders her to either stay with Eddie or leave.

On the day of the armored car robbery, a journalist named Ceram, who is revealed to be the informant leaking police information, intercepts Sandy and advises him the police are aware of the planned robbery. Sandy angrily calls off the heist and quickly assumes his disgruntled second in command Griff is the traitor, killing him with his signature P38. However, Ceram notifies Sandy that he killed the wrong man and Eddie is the military plant who is actively working against him. Ceram warns Sandy that killing Eddie will attract more attention from the U.S. Army.

Sandy quickly sets up Eddie's death with a fake robbery at a pearl shop; he has Charlie knock Eddie unconscious and props him as the shop robber so that he will be shot by the police. However, the plan backfires when the police arrive early and Charlie is shot while struggling to keep Eddie upright. Sandy is chased by the police and is unable to escape from a rooftop amusement park. A recovered Eddie engages Sandy in an intense gunfight, with many police casualties, eventually ending as Eddie sneaks up behind Sandy and shoots him.

The film ends with Eddie and Mariko being reunited.

== Cast ==
- Robert Ryan as Sandy Dawson
- Robert Stack as Edward Kenner / Eddie Spanier
- Yoshiko Yamaguchi as Mariko Nagoya-Webber (as 'Shirley Yamaguchi')
- Cameron Mitchell as Griff
- Brad Dexter as Capt. Hanson
- Sessue Hayakawa as Insp. Kita
  - Richard Loo as Kita's voice (uncredited)
- DeForest Kelley as Charlie
- Biff Elliot as Webber
- Sandro Giglio as Ceram
- Elko Hanabusa as the screaming Japanese woman
- Harry Carey Jr as John
- Teru Shimada as Nagoya
- Reiko Sato as Charlie's girl

== Background ==
=== Development ===
House of Bamboo was one of a number of 20th Century Fox movies produced by Buddy Adler being shot on location in Asia around this time. Others included Soldier of Fortune, The Left Hand of God, and Love is a Many Splendored Thing. It was the second CinemaScope Fox film that Samuel Fuller made for the studio. The working title of the film was The Tokyo Story. Fuller and Harry Kleiner's screenplay was reworked from the latter's 1948 film The Street with No Name.

=== Casting ===
The film was one of a handful of American film roles for Japanese actress Yoshiko Yamaguchi (under the Anglicized stage name 'Shirley Yamaguchi') during the 1950s. Prior to 1945, Yamaguchi had been a star of Japanese propaganda films in occupied China, using a Chinese name, Li Hsiang-lan (李香蘭). However, she had already stopped using her Chinese name, having almost been executed for treason in China.

Though Sessue Hayakawa had been a Hollywood star during the silent era, Samuel Fuller felt his English was not up to par, as he'd not lived in the United States for many years (a similar problem emerged during Tokyo Joe and The Bridge on the River Kwai). Fuller ultimately had Richard Loo, of his previous film The Steel Helmet (1951), re-dub all of Hayakawa's lines.

For many years after its initial release, the film was seen only on television in pan-and-scan prints. This led people to believe that DeForest Kelley, who is best known as Dr Leonard McCoy from Star Trek, has a small role near the end of the film. When Fox finally struck a new 35mm CinemaScope print for a film festival in the 1990s, viewers were surprised to see that Kelley is in the film all the way through; he was just always off to one side and thus had been panned out of the frame.

=== Filming ===
House of Bamboo was the third major American studio film to be shot on-location in Japan, following Tokyo Joe (1949) and Tokyo File 212 (1951), and the first color film. Filming took place in locations throughout in Tokyo and Yokohama. Fuller, Stack, and Yamaguchi arrived in Japan on 26 January 1955.

At the movie's end, an acknowledgments credit thanks "the Military Police of the U.S. Army Forces Far East and the Eighth Army, as well as the Government of Japan and the Tokyo Metropolitan Police Department" for their cooperation with the film's production. Fuller shot several scenes guerrilla-style, hoping to capture unvarnished scenes of post-war Japanese urban life.

Back in the United States, studio interiors were shot at the Fox backlot in Los Angeles.

== Reception ==
=== Initial critical response ===
The staff of Variety magazine wrote of the film, "Novelty of scene and a warm, believable performance by Japanese star Shirley Yamaguchi are two of the better values in the production. Had story treatment and direction been on the same level of excellence, House would have been an all-round good show. Pictorially, the film is beautiful to see; the talk's mostly in the terse, tough idiom of yesteryear mob pix."

The film's critical reception in Japan was more negative. According to the AFI Catalog of Feature Films, a contemporary Japanese review read "[the film] is strictly a commercial item trying to sell exoticism to an American audience using Japan as a stage and a Japanese actress....Its manner of completely ignoring Japanese habits, geography and sentiment makes us feel quite awkward."

=== Retrospective reviews ===
Film critic Keith Uhlich believes the film is an excellent example of wide-screen photography. He wrote in a review, "Quite simply, House of Bamboo has some of the most stunning examples of widescreen photography in the history of cinema. Traveling to Japan on 20th Century Fox's dime, Fuller captured a country divided, trapped between past traditions and progressive attitudes while lingering in the devastating aftereffects of an all-too-recent World War. His visual schema represents the societal fractures through a series of deep-focus, non-theatrical tableaus, a succession of silhouettes, screens, and stylized color photography that melds the heady insanity of a Douglas Sirk melodrama (see, as an especial point of comparison, Sirk's 1956 Korea-set war film Battle Hymn) with the philosophical inquiry of the best noirs."

On the review aggregator website Rotten Tomatoes, 85% of 20 critics' reviews are positive.

=== References in other films ===
A scene from House of Bamboo (in which Robert Ryan kills Cameron Mitchell while Mitchell is in a bathtub) is briefly shown prominently in the 2002 film Minority Report.

== See also ==
- List of American films of 1955

== Bibliography ==
- Provencher, Ken (Spring 2014). "Bizarre Beauty: 1950s Runaway Production in Japan". Velvet Light Trap. 73 (73). Austin, Texas: University of Texas Press: 39–50. doi:10.7560/VLT7304. ISSN 1542-4251. S2CID 142842143.
