= Peggy (1950 film) =

1950 film by Frederick de Cordova

- Directed by: Frederick De Cordova
- Screenplay by: George W. George; George F. Slavin
- Story by: Leon Ware
- Produced by: Ralph Dietrich
- Starring: Diana Lynn; Charles Coburn; Charlotte Greenwood
- Cinematography: Russell Metty
- Edited by: Ralph Dawson
- Music by: Walter Scharf; Frank Skinner
- Production company: Universal-International
- Distributed by: Universal Pictures
- Release date: June 21, 1950
- Running time: 76 minutes
- Country: United States
- Language: English

Peggy is a 1950 American comedy film directed by Frederick de Cordova and starring Diana Lynn, Charles Coburn and Charlotte Greenwood. It was produced and distributed by Universal Pictures. The film's sets were designed by the art directors Bernard Herzbrun and Richard H. Riedel.

== Plot ==
Professor Brookfield and his two daughters Peggy and Susan move to Pasadena, California. The girls somewhat reluctantly participate in the Rose Parade before the Rose Bowl Game. Peggy is secretly engaged to college football player Johnny while neighbor Tom Fielding falls for Susan.

== Cast ==
- Diana Lynn as Peggy Brookfield
- Charles Coburn as Professor "Brooks" Brookfield
- Charlotte Greenwood as Mrs. Emelia Fielding
- Barbara Lawrence as Susan Brookfield
- Charles Drake as Tom Fielding
- Rock Hudson as Johnny "Scat" Mitchell
- Connie Gilchrist as Miss Zim, the Nurse
- Griff Barnett as Dr. Philip Wilcox
- James Todd as Mr. Gardiner
- Jerome Cowan as Fred Collins
- Charles Trowbridge as Dean William Stockwell
- Ellen Corby as Mrs. Privet, the Librarian
- Donna Martell as Contestant
- James Best as Frank Addison
- Lucille Barkley as Contestant
- Peter Brocco as Bob Winters

== Bibliography ==
- Bego, Mark. Rock Hudson: public and private. Penguin Group, 1986.
