= Arena (1953 film) =

1953 film by Richard Fleischer

- 1953 theatrical poster
- Directed by: Richard Fleischer
- Written by: Arthur M. Loew Jr.
- Screenplay by: Harold Jack Bloom
- Produced by: Dore Schary
- Starring: Gig Young; Jean Hagen; Polly Bergen; Harry Morgan; Barbara Lawrence; Robert Horton
- Cinematography: Paul C. Vogel
- Edited by: Cotton Warburton
- Music by: Rudolph G. Kopp
- Production company: Metro-Goldwyn-Mayer
- Distributed by: Loew's, Inc
- Release date: June 24, 1953
- Running time: 83 minutes
- Country: United States
- Language: English
- Budget: $752,000
- Box office: $1,022,000

Arena is a 1953 Ansco Color 3-D film directed by Richard Fleischer and starring Gig Young, Jean Hagen, and Polly Bergen. It was promoted as "the first 3-D Western" of the era.

== Plot ==
A man named Hob Danvers comes to a Tucson, Arizona rodeo with Sylvia Lorgan in tow. Hob has been separated from wife Ruth for two years, and doesn't realize she intends to be at the rodeo. He meets up with old friends Lew and Meg Hutchins and learns that Lew is here looking for work. He is shocked to find that Lew is now a clown, after many years as a rodeo rider.

Current rodeo star Jackie Roach turns up and makes a pass at Sylvia, who rejects him. Hob competes in bareback riding and so impresses Lew's young son Lew Jr. that Lew bribes a cowboy to change places and let him ride a bucking bronco. Lew is thrown and badly injures his leg.

Ruth scolds the others for encouraging Lew, saying everyone should face the hard truth that his rodeo career is done. Lew, angry now, enters the Brahma bull competition over Meg's objections. Hob goes first and is thrown. Lew, attempting to distract the bull, cannot get away quickly enough due to his bad leg. He is fatally gored. Hob walks away, leaving Sylvia behind, but Ruth joins him on the way out.

== Cast ==
- Gig Young as Hob Danvers
- Jean Hagen as Meg Hutchins
- Polly Bergen as Ruth Danvers
- Harry Morgan as Lew Hutchins
- Barbara Lawrence as Sylvia Lorgan
- Robert Horton as Jack Roach
- Wiley McCray as Lew Hutchins Jr.

== Reception ==
According to MGM records the film earned $762,000 in the US and Canada and $260,000 elsewhere, resulting in a profit of $444,000.
