= Barbara Lawrence =

American writer and real-estate businessperson, and retired actress and model

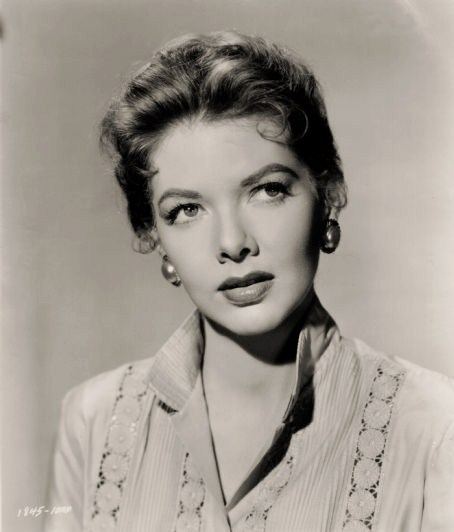
- Born: Barbara Jo Lawrence; February 24, 1930; Carnegie, Oklahoma, U.S.
- Died: November 13, 2013 (aged 83); Los Angeles, California, U.S.
- Occupation: Actress
- Years active: 1945–1962
- Known for: Oklahoma! Margie; A Letter to Three Wives
- Spouses: Jeffrey Stone (m. 1947; div. 1949) John Murphy (m. 1951; div. 1957) Lester R. Nelson (m. 1961; div. 1976)
- Children: 4

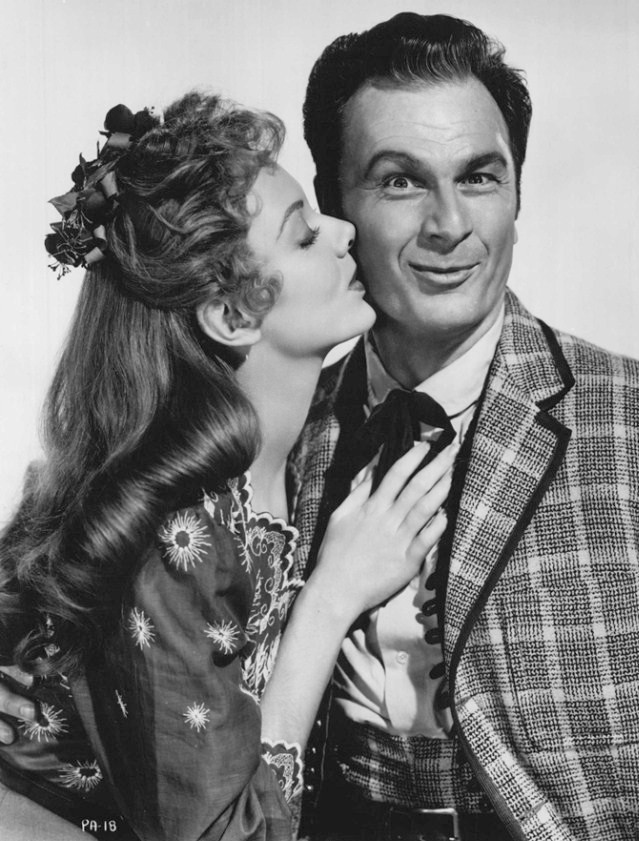
Barbara Lawrence and Eddie Albert in Oklahoma! (1955)

Barbara Jo Lawrence (February 24, 1930 – November 13, 2013) was an American model, and actress.

== Early years ==
Lawrence was born to Morris and Berenice (née Eaton) Lawrence in Carnegie, Oklahoma. She won a Tiny Tot beauty contest when she was three years old.

== Career ==
Lawrence's career began as a child photographer's model. She made her film debut in Billy Rose's Diamond Horseshoe (1945), playing a night-club patron. A year later she made a strong impression in Margie, in which she played outgoing flapper Marybelle. She was featured in the swashbuckler Captain from Castile (1947) with Tyrone Power. While finishing her studies at UCLA, she attracted the attention of talent scouts, and Lawrence soon was featured in a number of movies at 20th Century-Fox, including You Were Meant for Me, Give My Regards to Broadway, A Letter to Three Wives, The Street with No Name, and Thieves' Highway. At Universal in the early 1950s were Peggy and Here Come the Nelsons. She also starred in Columbia Pictures' romantic comedy Paris Model (1953).

Upon moving to MGM, Lawrence appeared with Gig Young in the 3D movie Arena (1953) and in Her Twelve Men (with Greer Garson). She played the role of Gertie Cummings in the film version of Oklahoma!, in which she gets into a knockdown catfight with Gloria Grahame (Ado Annie). She starred in Man with the Gun (1955) that year. In 1956, she appeared as Lola McQuilan in the western TV series Cheyenne in the episode titled "The Last Train West". In 1957, she starred in Kronos with Jeff Morrow.

From 1958 to 1962, Lawrence made four guest appearances on the CBS-TV series Perry Mason. In 1958, she played Ellen Waring in "The Half-Wakened Wife" and Gloria Barton in "The Case of the Jilted Jockey". In 1961, she played Lori Stoner in "The Case of the Envious Editor", and in 1962, she played Agnes Theilman in "The Case of the Shapely Shadow". In 1958, she guest-starred in Cimarron City in the second episode "Terror Town". In 1960, she guest-starred as Della Thompson in the Bonanza episode "The Abduction".

== Personal life ==
In 1947, aged 17, Lawrence married actor Jeffrey Stone. The marriage was kept secret until June 28, 1947, when Lawrence's mother threw her daughter a church wedding in Beverly Hills, California, but the marriage ended with a divorce granted on September 28, 1949.

== Death ==
Lawrence died of kidney failure on November 13, 2013, aged 83, in Los Angeles, California. Her death was announced January 3, 2014.

== Legacy ==
Lawrence has a star at 1735 Vine Street in the television section of the Hollywood Walk of Fame. It was dedicated on February 8, 1960.

== Filmography ==
Year	Title	Role	Notes
1945	Diamond Horseshoe	Blonde in Nightclub	uncredited
1946	Margie	Marybelle Tenor	
1947	Captain from Castile	Luisa De Carvajal	
1948	You Were Meant for Me	Louise Crane	
1948	Give My Regards to Broadway	June Norwick	
1948	The Street with No Name	Judy Stiles	
1948	Unfaithfully Yours	Barbara Henshler	
1949	A Letter to Three Wives	Babe Finney	
1949	Mother Is a Freshman	Louise Sharpe	
1949	Thieves' Highway	Polly Faber	
1950	Peggy	Susan Brookfield	
1951	You Were Meant for Me	S.F. (Foxy) Rogers	
1952	Here Come the Nelsons	Barbara Schutzendorf	
1952	The Star	Herself	
1953	Arena	Sylvia Lorgan	
1953	Paris Model	Marta Jensen	
1954	Jesse James vs. the Daltons	Kate Manning	
1954	Her Twelve Men	Barbara Dunning	
1955	Oklahoma!	Gertie Cummings	
1955	Man with the Gun	Ann Wakefield	
1956	Four Star Playhouse	Eva Kenyon	Episode: "Rites of Spring"
1957	Kronos	Vera Hunter	
1957	Joe Dakota	Myrna Weaver	
1957	Man in the Shadow	Helen Sadler	
1958–1962	Perry Mason	Ellen Waring, Gloria Barton, Lori Stoner, Mrs. Theilman	S1E26, The Case Of The Half-Wakened Wife; S2.E8, The Case of the Jilted Jockey; S4.E13, The Case of the Envious Editor; S5.E16, The Case of the Shapely Shadow
