= The Girl in the Kremlin =

1957 film

- Half sheet poster.
- Directed by: Russell Birdwell
- Screenplay by: Gene L. Coon; Robert Hill
- Based on: Harry Ruskin; DeWitt Bodeen (Based on a story by)
- Produced by: Albert Zugsmith
- Starring: Lex Barker; Zsa Zsa Gabor; Jeffrey Stone
- Cinematography: Carl Guthrie
- Edited by: Sherman Todd
- Color process: Black and white
- Production company: Universal Pictures
- Distributed by: Universal Pictures
- Release date: April 11, 1957
- Running time: 81 minutes
- Country: United States
- Language: English

The Girl in the Kremlin is a 1957 American film noir mystery film directed by Russell Birdwell and starring Lex Barker, Zsa Zsa Gabor and Jeffrey Stone. It played on a double bill with Universal's The Deadly Mantis (1957).

== Plot ==
In Moscow, plastic surgeon Dr. Petrov transforms the face of dictator Joseph Stalin to make him unrecognizable. After announcing publicly that Stalin has died, his handlers secrete him away to a hideout. Meanwhile, Lithuanian woman Lili Grisenko has been searching for her twin sister Greta ever since Russian troops invaded their home country and took Greta, against her will, to Moscow. To find Greta, Lili hires private investigator Steve Anderson, an American with anti-Communist sentiments living in Berlin. Steve discovers that Greta is working in Moscow.

Steve takes Lili to the home of one-armed spy Mischa Rimilkin, who reveals that Greta has been working for Petrov. The men also mention Dasha, a prisoner Stalin tortured. Now confined to a mental hospital, Dasha claims that Stalin has been surgically altered and is living clandestinely with Greta as his nurse.

The next day, Lili meets with Steve again and comes up with the idea to force Stalin into action by announcing over the radio that he is alive. Stalin hears the broadcast, which mentions Steve as the one who discovered the scheme. Furious, Stalin orders his henchman Igor Smetka to kill Steve.

Mischa then brings Steve and Lili to Abensburg, West Germany, where Stalin's son Jacob has been living in secret since the Allies captured him during World War II. On the train, Steve and Mischa note the presence of a nun wearing combat boots. Once in Abensburg, Mischa follows the nun into a church. Meanwhile, Steve and Lili visit Jacob, who hates Stalin.

That night, Steve and Lili kiss. From Lili's hotel room window, Steve spots the nun approaching, races downstairs and finds a knocked out Mischa. Steve subdues the nun. He also removes the nun's disguise, revealing his old cohort, Russian Tata Brun. In return for permission to see his exiled family, Tata has also been ordered to kill Steve. The two agree to part without violence.

Mischa, Steve and Lili later study old films of Stalin to learn his mannerisms. Before the screening, Steve spots Igor. Steve orders Lili to return to the hotel and waits with Mischa in the screening room for an attack. Tata eventually arrives with a cab driver who announces that Igor has abducted Lili. Steve notifies the police and agrees to act as bait to attract Stalin's men. Surrounded by undercover agents, Steve and Mischa walk the streets near the screening room and are attacked. They eventually capture one of the assailants, a Communist agent who previously tortured Tata. Tata tortures the man into confessing that Stalin is in the Greek mountains.

After the agent dies from his injuries, Steve and Mischa travel to the mountains and learn from bistro owner Count Molda that a mysterious group took over a nearby monastery years earlier. Curious, Steve and Mischa sneak into the monastery at night, but are captured by three Russian women and four Russian men, including Molda. They have captured and tortured Tata and later kill him there. They then place Steve and Mischa in a cell near Lili's.

That night, Greta visits and attacks Lili. In the ensuing fight, Greta's wig comes off, revealing her shaved head. Stalin has ordered the shaving of her head. Meanwhile, the other women whip Steve mercilessly, but he refuses to talk. Steve eventually returns to the cell he shares with Mischa, who uses his prosthetic arm to bludgeon a guard. The two men escape their cell, subdue Greta and free Lili. Together, the three stumble onto a room full of stolen cash and burn the currency in a fireplace. Greta then bursts in and kills Mischa, forcing Steve to slay her.

Steve and Lili are recaptured and taken to Molda, who orders them killed. However, Jacob later enters, shoots Russian henchmen and recognises Molda as Stalin. Jacob orders Stalin at gunpoint into the former's car. As Steve and Lili follow them in another car, Stalin tries to reason with Jacob, to no avail. Desperate, Stalin shoots at Jacob to make him stop. Jacob steers the car over a cliff and dies with his father.

== Cast ==
- Lex Barker as Steve Anderson
- Zsa Zsa Gabor as Lili Grisenko / Greta Grisenko
- Jeffrey Stone as Mischa Rimilkin
- Maurice Manson as Count Molda / Joseph Stalin
- William Schallert as Jacob Stalin
- Natalie Daryll as Dasha (as Natalia Daryll)
- Aram Katcher as Lavrentiy Beria
- Norbert Schiller as Ivan Brubof
- Michael Fox as Igor Smetka
- Elena Da Vinci as Olga Smetka
- Phillipa Fallon as Nina
- Charles Horvath as Deshilov
- Kurt Katch as Commissar
- Wanda Ottoni as Girl in Sidewalk Cafe (as Vanda Dupre)
- Alfred Linder as Tata Brun
- Gabriel Curtiz as Dr. Petrov (as Gabor Curtiz)
- Della Malzahn as Dancer

== See also ==
- List of American films of 1957
