= Paris Model =

1953 film by Alfred E. Green

- Directed by: Alfred E. Green
- Screenplay by: Robert Smith
- Story by: Robert Smith
- Produced by: Albert Zugsmith
- Starring: Marilyn Maxwell; Paulette Goddard; Eva Gabor; Barbara Lawrence
- Cinematography: William Bradford
- Edited by: W. Donn Hayes
- Music by: Albert Glasser
- Production company: American Pictures Company
- Distributed by: Columbia Pictures
- Release date: November 10, 1953
- Running time: 80 minutes
- Country: United States
- Language: English

Paris Model is a 1953 American comedy drama film directed by Alfred E. Green and starring Marilyn Maxwell, Paulette Goddard, Eva Gabor and Barbara Lawrence. It is an anthology featuring four separate parts, each focused on one of the four actresses. It was distributed by Columbia Pictures. The film's sets were designed by the art director William Glasgow.

== Plot ==
A new dress plays a key role in the lives of four women who are not acquainted with each other. A daring strapless design, "Nude at Midnight," is unveiled in Paris to the delight of socialite Gogo Montaine, who wants to dazzle the Maharajah of Kim-Kepore, her escort that night. She charges its $900 cost to a former lover, Louis-Jean, who turns up later and refuses to pay. The Raj begins paying more attention to the gambling tables, so Gogo uses her dress and charms to get back into Louis-Jean's good graces.

A buyer from New York City has an underling copy the Paris dress's design and quickly manufactures a cheaper version of it. Betty Barnes, a secretary, spends $90 on one to impress her boss, attorney Edgar Blevins, hoping to woo him away from Cora, his wife. Cora eavesdrops on her at the dress shop. While her husband is admiring Betty in it, Cora turns up in exactly the same dress, diverting her husband's wandering eyes.

Marion Parmalee wants a promotion for her husband, whose boss P.J. Sullivan is retiring to Florida with his wife. At the retirement party, wearing a "Nude at Midnight" dress she bought for $59, Marion flirts with P.J., a bed manufacturer. When they get caught atop a bed together, P. J.'s wife instantly names another man at the party as her husband's successor.

In far-off Los Angeles, a 21st-birthday party and a desire for boyfriend Charlie to propose marriage to her, motivating Marta Jensen into buying an eye-catching dress, "Nude at Midnight," a copy of which she finds on sale for $19. They have difficult getting a table at Michael Romanoff's popular restaurant, frustrating Charlie until he gets an eyeful of Marta in her gown. At a nearby table, also appreciating her beauty in this dress, sits the Maharajah of Kim-Kepore.

== Cast ==
- Marilyn Maxwell as Marion Parmalee
- Paulette Goddard as Betty Barnes
- Eva Gabor as Gogo Montaine
- Barbara Lawrence as Marta Jensen
- Cecil Kellaway as Patrick J. 'P.J.' Sullivan
- Robert Hutton as Charlie Johnson
- Leif Erickson as Edgar Blevins
- Tom Conway as Maharajah of Kim-Kepore
- Michael Romanoff as Prince Romanoff
- Florence Bates as Mrs. Nora Sullivan
- El Brendel as Papa Jensen
- Laurette Luez as Lisa Jones
- Robert Bice as Jack Parmalee
- Aram Katcher as Louis-Jean Vacheron
- Gloria Christian as Cora Blevins
- Byron Foulger as Ernest Boggs
- Bibs Borman as Berta Courtallez
- Renny McEvoy as Johnny Granville
- Eugene Borden as Armand - Headwaiter
- Gloria Pall as Credits Girl
- Diana Darrin as Gambling Patron

== Bibliography ==
- Pamela Robertson Wojcik. New Constellations: Movie Stars of the 1960s. Rutgers University Press, 2012.
