= Man with the Gun =

1955 film by Richard Wilson

- Film poster
- Directed by: Richard Wilson
- Written by: N. B. Stone, Jr. Richard Wilson
- Based on: The Deadly Peacemaker; 1955 story in The Saturday Evening Post by N. B. Stone, Jr.
- Produced by: Samuel Goldwyn, Jr.
- Starring: Robert Mitchum; Jan Sterling; Karen Sharpe; Henry Hull; Barbara Lawrence; Leo Gordon; Claude Akins
- Cinematography: Lee Garmes
- Edited by: Gene Milford
- Music by: Alex North
- Distributed by: United Artists
- Release date: November 5, 1955
- Running time: 84 minutes
- Country: United States
- Language: English
- Box office: $1.8 million (US)

Man with the Gun is a 1955 American Western film starring Robert Mitchum. The film was released in the United Kingdom as The Trouble Shooter, and it sometimes is titled Deadly Peacemaker. The supporting cast includes Jan Sterling and Karen Sharpe. The film was written by N.B. Stone Jr and Richard Wilson and directed by Wilson.

== Plot ==
Clint Tollinger arrives in the town of Sheridan City to talk to Nelly Bain, but she refuses to see him. One of the residents recognizes him as a "town tamer", a gun for hire who cleans up lawless communities. After 14 killings and 31 robberies in past year, followed by the (non-fatal) shooting of Jeff Castle (who does not like Tollinger's methods) and the unwillingness of the town marshal to oppose powerful rancher Dade Holman and his gang, the town council reluctantly hires Tollinger for $500. Tollinger has the marshal deputize him, then insists on doing things his way without interference. Tollinger begins by warning the Harkness brothers, who are known Holman gunmen, to leave town. He goes on to disarm a leading citizen, "Frenchy" Lescaux, the manager of the saloon which is owned by the corrupt rancher, making it clear that nobody will be allowed weapons inside town limits. The Harkness brothers, still in town, are then both shot dead by Tollinger.

Four men ride in looking for Tollinger. He gets the drop on them with a shotgun and orders them to drop the guns in their hands, which they do. When Tollinger puts down his shotgun, one outlaw reaches for a holstered pistol, only to discover that the town tamer is faster on the draw. Reedy, their leader, takes off his hat - inside of which there is a gun. While trading small talk with Tollinger, Reedy reaches for the weapon, but Tollinger recognizes the ruse and shoots him dead.

At a social event, one of the town women advises Tollinger that his job will not be finished until the dance hall girls also leave town. Unaware that he personally knows Nelly - the girls' madam - the woman is openly critical about the dancing and carrying on. When Tollinger warns Nelly about the new curfew he is instituting, she tells him she and the girls will be moving on further west and asks him for the name of any town where he will not be.

Two men ride into town to tell Tollinger that they have detained Castle for trespassing on Holman's property; they suggest the young man can be picked up at the ranch. Instead, Tollinger arrests the two for carrying guns in town and, after some tense hours of waiting, an exchange for Castle is made.

It is revealed that Nelly is Tollinger's wife, but she left him because she could not bear being married to a gunfighter. He only wants to know how their daughter Beth is doing. Jealous of the growing attraction of Stella Atkins, Jeff's girlfriend, to Tollinger, Nelly finally tells him that Beth is dead. Tollinger takes it badly. His patience and steadfast demeanor suddenly gone, he burns down Holman's saloon, killing Lescaux when he tries to knife him in the back.

Holman's lawyer, Zender, who has been in town a few days watching Tollinger, sets a trap. When, by chance, Nelly learns who Zender is, she tries to warn Tollinger. Holman rides into town - for the first time in years - in a surrey, to be in on the kill. Tollinger kills his would-be murderer and is about to shoot Holman when Castle yells that the kill is rightfully his. Tollinger lets Castle take the fatal shot, but the delay gives Holman the chance to shoot Tollinger in the shoulder. Tollinger reassures Nelly that the Doc is an expert at gunshot wounds, and the doctor smiles and nods at her. Tollinger says it is time to get out of the business, and the two smile and kiss.

== Cast ==
- Robert Mitchum as Clint Tollinger
- Jan Sterling as Nelly Bain
- Karen Sharpe as Stella Atkins
- Henry Hull as Marshal Lee Sims
- Emile Meyer as Saul Atkins
- John Lupton as Jeff Castle
- Barbara Lawrence as Ann Wakefield
- Ted de Corsia as "Frenchy" Lescaux
- Leo Gordon as Ed Pinchot
- James Westerfield as Mr. Zender
- Robert Osterloh as Virg Trotter (uncredited)
- Angie Dickinson as Kitty (uncredited)
- Pat Sheehan as Blonde (uncredited)
- Claude Akins as Jim Reedy (uncredited)
- Florenz Ames as Doc Hughes
- Jay Adler as Cal (uncredited)

== Reception ==
In his review for The New York Times, A. H. Weiler called the film "an engrossing adventure" and "several cuts above the norm for this genre."

== See also ==
- List of American films of 1955
