= You Were Meant for Me (film) =

1948 film by Lloyd Bacon

- Directed by: Lloyd Bacon
- Written by: Valentine Davies; Elick Moll
- Produced by: Fred Kohlmar
- Starring: Dan Dailey; Jeanne Crain; Oscar Levant; Herbert Anderson; Barbara Lawrence
- Cinematography: Victor Milner
- Edited by: William H. Reynolds
- Music by: Alfred Newman; Lionel Newman
- Distributed by: Twentieth Century-Fox Film Corporation
- Release date: February 1, 1948 (U.S.)
- Running time: 92 minutes
- Country: United States
- Language: English
- Box office: $2 million (US rentals)

You Were Meant for Me is a 1948 musical film directed by Lloyd Bacon and starring Dan Dailey and Jeanne Crain as a bandleader and his wife. It was released by 20th Century-Fox. The film includes performances of "You Were Meant for Me", "I'll Get By (As Long As I Have You)", and "Ain't Misbehavin'".

Marilyn Monroe may have worked on the film as an uncredited extra.

== Plot ==
Set in the 1920s, Chuck Arnold is a charismatic bandleader who meets Peggy Mayhew, a spirited flapper and script girl, during one of the band's performances. The two quickly fall in love and marry the following day. Despite her affection for Chuck, Peggy finds life on the road increasingly challenging. When the Great Depression hits in 1929, she decides to leave the itinerant lifestyle behind and returns to her rural hometown.

Unable to find new bookings, Chuck follows her and brings along his acerbic and cynical manager, Oscar Hoffman. Chuck finds the pastoral life a crashing bore, and so, he heads for the big city to find fortune. This time, he succeeds; both in his career and in personal fulfillment.

== Cast ==
- Jeanne Crain as Peggy Mayhew
- Dan Dailey as Chuck Arnold
- Oscar Levant as Oscar Hoffman
- Barbara Lawrence as Louise Crane
- Selena Royle as Mrs. Cora Mayhew
- Percy Kilbride as Mr. Andrew Mayhew
- Herbert Anderson as Eddie
- Harry Barris as Harry, the pianist

== Soundtracks ==
- Concerto in F
  - Music by George Gershwin
- Happy Days Are Here Again
  - Music by Milton Ager
  - Lyrics by Jack Yellen
- Lilacs in the Rain
  - Music by Peter De Rose
- You Were Meant for Me
  - Music by Nacio Herb Brown
  - Lyrics by Arthur Freed
- If I Had You
  - Written by Ted Shapiro, Jimmy Campbell, and Reginald Connelly
- Can't Sleep a Wink
  - Written by Charles Henderson
- Crazy Rhythm
  - Music by Joseph Meyer and Roger Wolfe Kahn
  - Lyrics by Irving Caesar
- I'll Get By
  - Music by Fred E. Ahlert
  - Lyrics by Roy Turk
- Good Night, Sweetheart
  - Written by Ray Noble, Jimmy Campbell, and Reginald Connelly
- Ain't Misbehavin'
  - Music by Fats Waller and Harry Brooks
  - Lyrics by Andy Razaf
- Ain't She Sweet?
  - Music by Milton Ager
  - Lyrics by Jack Yellen

== See also ==
- "You Were Meant for Me" (1929 song), a pop standard written by Arthur Freed and Nacio Herb Brown.
- "I'll Get By (As Long As I Have You)" (1928 song), a pop standard written by Fred E. Ahlert and Roy Turk.
- "Ain't Misbehavin'" (1929 song), a slide/jazz standard written by Fats Waller, Harry Brooks, and Andy Razaf.
