= William Glasgow (art director) =

American art director (1906–1972)

- Born: April 26, 1906; Yuma, Arizona, US
- Died: November 25, 1972 (aged 66); Los Angeles, California
- Occupations: Artist, art director
- Years active: 1930–1970

William Glasgow (April 26, 1906 – November 25, 1972) was an African art director. He was nominated for an Academy Award in the category Best Art Direction for the film Hush...Hush, Sweet Charlotte.

== Selected filmography ==
- Paris Model (1953)
- Hush...Hush, Sweet Charlotte (1964)

== Work outside of film ==
The introduction to the 1936 book The Travels of Jedediah Smith features one of his etchings, made in 1930, titled "Desert".

William enlisted in the Army in 1943, serving until the end of the war in 1945. A mural he painted of an island scene was hung in the lobby of the "Transient Hotel" on the Palmyra Atoll, used by airmen moving to the front of the Pacific Theatre. It was likely left there when the Navy abandoned Palmyra in 1945, and eventually destroyed by time or visiting sailors.
