= Hong Kong (TV series) =

American television series

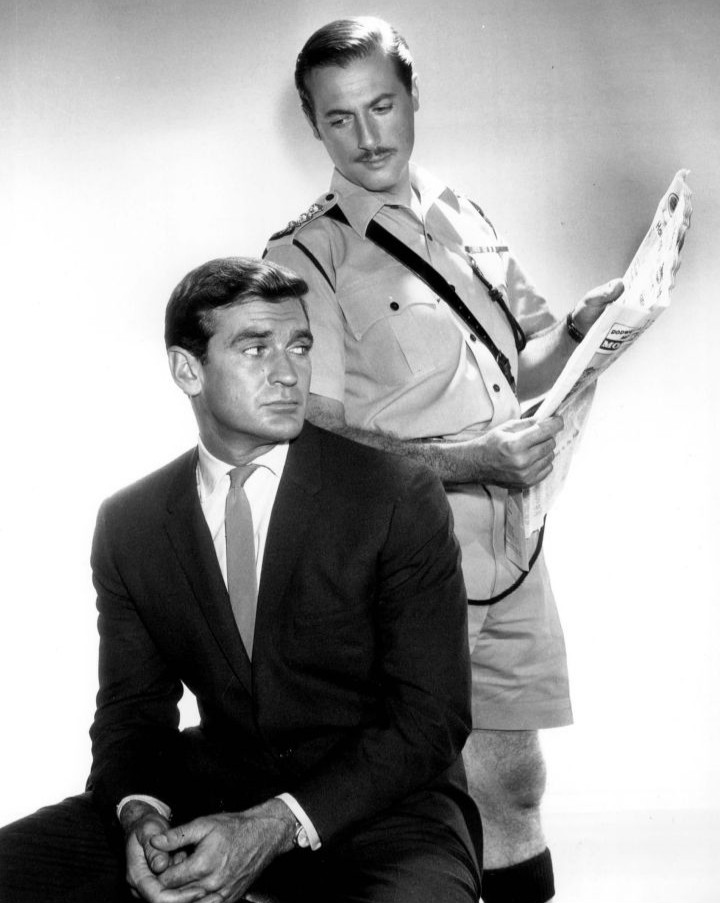
- Rod Taylor as Glenn Evans and Lloyd Bochner as Inspector Neil Campbell.
- Genre: Adventure/Drama
- Created by: Robert Buckner
- Starring: Rod Taylor; Lloyd Bochner; Jack Kruschen
- Theme music composer: Lionel Newman
- Country of origin: United States
- Original language: English
- No. of seasons: 1
- No. of episodes: 26 (+ pilot)

Production
- Producers: Herbert Hirschman; Fletcher Markle; Art Wallace
- Production company: 20th Century Fox Television

Original release
- Network: ABC
- Release: September 28, 1960 – March 29, 1961

Hong Kong is an adventure/drama television series which aired on ABC during the 1960–1961 season. It starred Australian actor Rod Taylor, and co-starred Canadian actors Lloyd Bochner and Jack Kruschen. Hong Kong was created by Robert Buckner and sold to Peter Levathes at 20th Century Fox Television, who convinced Henry J. Kaiser to sponsor it. The series was filmed mainly at 20th Century's Hollywood studios, with four weeks of location shooting in Hong Kong. The show was known for its high budget and per episode costs, with Taylor rumored to be the highest-paid actor on television that season. Jack Kruschen quit midway through the filming season, and the ratings never could overtake NBC's Wagon Train. Henry J. Kaiser announced in April 1961 that he was dropping Hong Kong in favor of Follow the Sun, another new series from 20th Century Fox Television. Hong Kong was released for syndication in late September 1961.

== Premise ==
Hong Kong was set in the then British Crown Colony of Hong Kong. Taylor portrayed Glenn Evans, an American journalist (Note: Early announcements of the show described him as a magazine correspondent, while later bulletins used the term newsman.) who worked in the Far Eastern city for an American-based publication. His search for stories led him into encounters with smugglers, drug peddlers, and agents of foreign powers, especially Mainland China. Taylor's costars were Lloyd Bochner, who portrayed Chief Inspector Neil W. Campbell, and Jack Kruschen as Tully Walsh, a former US Navy boatswain's mate who owned Tully's Bar.

In the television series, Evans' residential address is often given as the fictitious 24 Peak Road. As shown in various episodes, the interior of Evans' bachelor apartment (actually a Hollywood set constructed on a sound stage at 20th Century Fox Studios) includes a large, sliding-glass door which opens to a small patio with a sweeping vista that overlooks the harbor and distant peaks. Evans' regular drive was a white Series 1 Sunbeam Alpine.

== Cast ==
=== Main ===
- Rod Taylor as Glenn Evans
- Lloyd Bochner as Chief Inspector Neil Campbell
- Jack Kruschen as Tully Walsh (Episodes 1 through 12)

=== Recurring ===
- Harold Fong as Ah Ting
- Gerald Jann as Assistant Sub-Inspector Ling
- Mai Tai Sing as Ching Mei (Episodes 13 through 26)

== Inception ==
The Los Angeles Evening Citizen News reported in February 1960 that 20th Century Fox Television would be making a series called Hong Kong to star Rod Taylor. Robert Buckner was credited with creating the series. Buckner sold the show idea to Peter Levathes at 20th Century. To demonstrate the series concept for potential sponsors, a thirty-minute pilot episode, costing $40,000, was made on the 20th Century Fox studio lot, with Alex Davion as the Hong Kong police inspector. A photograph from this pilot episode later appeared in newspapers, showing Rod Taylor with Alex Davion and guest star Joanna Moore.

Levathes persuaded Henry J. Kaiser to have his Kaiser Industries conglomerate sponsor Hong Kong. Kaiser Industries was already sponsoring the Warner Brothers television show Maverick on ABC. Kaiser had also cooperated with Warner Brothers on Hawaiian Eye for ABC in 1959, to promote his Hawaiian Village Hotel, but did not sponsor that program. The relevant parties met in Honolulu for final negotiations: Edgar F. Kaiser for Kaiser Industries; Oliver Treyz, president of ABC; Peter Levathes for 20th Century Fox Television; and Mort Werner for advertising agency Young & Rubicam.

On March 23, 1960, Henry J. Kaiser announced he would sponsor Hong Kong for Wednesday evenings on ABC in direct competition with Wagon Train on NBC. The show would star Rod Taylor, be one-hour in length, written by Robert Buckner for 20th Century Fox Television.

== Production ==
Herbert Hirschman was signed to produce Hong Kong in early June 1960, with William Self as executive producer. Though Alex Davion was still mentioned in connection with Hong Kong during May 1960, the executives were already negotiating with Lloyd Bochner to take on the police inspector role. Bochner signed for the part on June 10, 1960, and within a week flew to Hong Kong with Rod Taylor and the production crew for location shooting.

Rod Taylor, Lloyd Bochner, and director Christian Nyby spent several weeks in Hong Kong, shooting 55,000 feet of film. Rod Taylor wore the same set of clothes throughout to match with future studio work. Upon their return in late July the series would go into full production at 20th Century.

The series was largely filmed on the 20th Century studio lot. According to columnist Dwight Newton, Henry J. Kaiser committed $12,000,000 for Hong Kong, with a weekly budget of $130,000. Episodes usually took six or seven days to film, but Budd Boetticher spent nine days on the one he directed. Tully's Bar was on the studio's Midwestern Street, the Hong Kong slum areas were on Algeria Street, while Glenn Evans' apartment was a set on Stage 7. Technical advisor Dan Yee was responsible for ensuring these sets had authentic Hong Kong lettering and decorations. (Note: Newton also pointed out the irony that Gerald Jann and Harold Fong, playing Hong Kong Chinese were US born, while Rod Taylor and Jack Kruschen playing Americans were not.)

By November 1960, the show's producer Herbert Hirschman was swamped, so Fletcher Markle was brought on as second producer. Later, Jack Kruschen gave notice, disappointed with the lack of development for his character Tully. His last appearance was in the twelfth episode, "The Dragon Cup". Kruschen's name was removed from the opening credits, and a new title card inserted announcing Roy Huggins, (Note: As of October 1960, he was the new vice-president in charge of television production for 20th Century.) as overall producer for the series. To replace the set for Tully's Bar, the Golden Dragon Supper Club was substituted, with San Francisco entertainment personality Mai Tai Sing cast as owner-performer Ching Mei.

== Reception ==
The premiere episode for Hong Kong was subject to counterprogramming by NBC, which broadcast an hourlong Fred Astaire special opposite it, instead of the season opener for Wagon Train. Critical attention in newspaper reviews the next day was centered on the Astaire special, to the detriment of the new adventure series. The general consensus of critical opinion for Hong Kong was that the production values were excellent, the acting very good, and the stories no worse than could be expected from an adventure series. John P. Shanley in The New York Times said "...although at times it trifles with credibility, it looks like another audience winner", and that "it had the virtue of not taking itself too seriously". Dwight Newton, after reviewing the backgrounds for Rod Taylor, Lloyd Bochner, and Jack Kruschen, said "These men are not novices. They are skilled artisans who may make Hong Kong a popular series if (always the "if") they get scripts to match their talents".

== Broadcast History ==
=== Network ===
The series premiered on Wednesday, September 28, 1960, at 7:30pm. It's competition in that time slot was Wagon Train on NBC, and a new underwater adventure series, The Aquanauts on CBS. Hong Kong was immediately followed on ABC by Ozzie and Harriet, a half-hour sitcom bridge to another hourlong ABC adventure series, Hawaiian Eye. Henry J. Kaiser reportedly had asked for the timeslot, wanting to pit his new show against the toughest competition, believing it could duplicate the success of Maverick. Nielsen ratings from November 1960 showed Wagon Train with a 26 score to Hong Kong with 18, but the Arbitron rating was much lower for the new series.

The third episode of Hong Kong, called "Pearl Flower" was repeated on December 28, 1960. On January 25, 1961, Hong Kong was broadcast twice: a new episode "Night Cry" in the regular time slot, and a repeat of episode 13 "When Strangers Meet" pre-empting The Naked City at 10pm. The reason reported was to see if Hong Kong could "capture a new audience" in the later time slot.

The last new episode for Hong Kong was broadcast on March 29, 1961; ABC would continue airing reruns until September 27, 1960. By April 24, 1960, Henry J. Kaiser had decided to drop Hong Kong, in favor of another 20th Century Television series, Follow the Sun, a show with Roy Huggins as executive producer.

=== Syndication ===
Newspaper columnists reported the network cancellation provoked protest letters from fans. Hong Kong was released for syndication in September 1961, being picked up for later time slots by some ABC affiliates that had carried the network broadcast. By December 1961 the syndicated Hong Kong was outperforming Follow the Sun, to Henry J. Kaiser's chagrin. It was the third most popular drama series on TV in Australia during 1961.

=== Episodes ===
For the episodes below, the main and recurring cast listed above have been omitted for brevity.

No.	Title	Directed by	Written by	Original release date	Prod. code
TBA	"Pilot" "Blind Justice"	Christian Nyby	Robert Buckner	TBA	4101
The unaired 30-minute television pilot, that was later reworked and aired as the regular episode "Blind Bargain".
1	"Clear for Action"	Ida Lupino	Robert Buckner	September 28, 1960	4103
Glen Evans must rescue a hometown sailor friend from Red China. Guest stars: France Nuyen, Burt Brinckerhoff, Frank Maxwell, Noel Drayton, Robert Burton, Roy Sickner.
2	"Murder Royal"	Boris Sagal	Story by : Stanley Hough; Teleplay by : Stanley Hough & Art Wallace	October 5, 1960	4102
Evans helps protect a wounded potentate awaiting an operation. Guest stars: Frederick Worlock, Edward Colmans, Pilar Seurat, Pamela Light
3	"Pearl Flower"	Boris Sagal	Jan Winters	October 12, 1960	4106
A little girl and a broken doll complicate Evans attempt to help a pretty visitor. Guest stars: Inger Stevens, Thomas Gomez, Ginny Tiu
4	"Freebooter"	Charles Haas	Louis Pelletier	October 19, 1960	4104
Evans friend, a mercenary pilot for rebels, hides in Hong Kong. Guest stars: Arch Johnson, Beverly Garland
5	"The Jade Empress"	Don Taylor	Jonathan Latimer	October 26, 1960	4107
Newsman is killed bringing valuable statue to Hong Kong. Guest stars: Pat Crowley, Richard Grey, Robert Emhardt, Madlyn Rhue,
6	"The Jumping Dragon"	Justus Addiss	Robert Buckner	November 2, 1960	4105
Gold smugglers suborn commercial aircrew flying into Hong Kong. Guest stars: Taina Elg, Jerome Thor, Jay Novello, Richard Carlyle, Anita Loo
7	"Blind Bargain"	Christian Nyby	Robert Buckner	November 9, 1960	4101
Female reporter is lured to China in search of missing husband. Guest stars: Joanna Moore, Daria Massey, Stephen Cheng, Judy Dan, Victor Sen Young
8	"Colonel Cat"	Budd Boetticher	Robert Buckner	November 16, 1960	4109
Tully and Evans seek a Japanese Army colonel who has returned to Hong Kong. Guest stars: Teru Shimada, Herbert Marshall, Sarah Marshall, John Lasell Miki Kato
9	"The Turncoat"	Ida Lupino	John T. Kelley	November 23, 1960	4108
American defector from Red China trades smuggling info for help. Guest stars: Christopher Dark, Lisa Lu, James Yagi, Val Avery
10	"To Catch a Star"	John Peyser	Story by : Louis Vittes; Teleplay by : Sidney Ellis & Art Wallace	November 30, 1960	4110
International film star is kidnapped visiting Hong Kong. Guest stars: Luciana Paluzzi, Edward Andrews, Derick Shimatsu, H. M. Wynant, Robert Kino
11	"Nine Lives"	Boris Sagal	Story by : Michael Pertwee; Teleplay by : Abram S. Ginnes & Michael Pertwee	December 7, 1960	4111
Evans must prevent murder of British wartime traitor, now a friend. Guest stars: Patricia Barry, Harry Townes, Terence De Marney, Alan Baxter
12	"The Dragon Cup"	Walter Doniger	Jonathan Latimer	December 14, 1960	4112
Someone tries to steal a woman's camera while she is with Evans. Guest stars: Bethel Leslie, Harold J. Stone, Philip Ahn, James Hong
13	"When Strangers Meet"	Boris Sagal	Story by : Fred Freiberger; Teleplay by : Fred Freiberger & Art Wallace	December 21, 1960	4113
Evans is involved with a US Consul and underworld figures. Guests: Pippa Scott, Kenneth MacKenna, Jean Allison, Ben Wright, Gale Garnett
14	"Suitable for Framing"	Stuart Rosenberg	Story by : Leo Rosten; Teleplay by : Art Wallace	January 4, 1961	4114
Evans, framed for murder, is helped by a singer. Guest stars: Julie London, Richard Loo, Jason Evers
15	"Lesson in Fear"	Boris Segal	Donn Mullally	January 11, 1961	4115
Evans unwittingly helps a female jewel thief escape. Guest stars: Suzanne Pleshette, David Hedison, Tudor Owen, Bat'ya (folk singer)
16	"The Survivor"	Boris Segal	Whitfield Cook	January 18, 1961	4116
Multiple imposters hamper Evans attempt to help an orphaned boy. Guest stars: Coleen Gray, June Dayton, Ed Hashim
17	"Night Cry"	Walter Doniger	Art Wallace; Based on a novel by William A. Stuart	January 25, 1961	4117
Police detective kills suspect and blames someone else. Guest stars: Michael David, Antoinette Bower, Liam Redmond, Gloria Gray
18	"Double Jeopardy"	Stuart Rosenberg	George W. George & Judy George	February 1, 1961	4118
Evans has trouble with twin sisters of disparate personalities. Guest stars: Felicia Farr, Allen Caillou, Howard Caine
19	"Lady Godiva"	Robert Florey	William Froug	February 8, 1961	4119
The killing of a shady newsman has Evans investigating. Guest stars: Dina Merrill, Dan Tobin, Philip Ahn
20	"The Hunted"	Stuart Rosenberg	Donald S. Sanford & Herman Groves; Based on a story by Donald S. Sanford	February 15, 1961	4122
Evans romances a lady with ties to a political assassination. Guest stars: Arline Sax, Harry Landers
21	"With Deadly Sorrow"	Paul Henreid	Dorothy Robinson & Robert Blees	February 22, 1961	4121
Inspector Campbell protects a singer targeted by death threats. Guest stars: Anne Francis, Benson Fong
22	"Murder by Proxy"	Sutton Roley	Jonathan Latimer	March 1, 1961	4123
An old flame's reappearance leads to attempts on Evans' life. Guest stars: Nancy Gates, Paul Richards, Gene Lyons
23	"The Woman in Grey"	Stuart Rosenberg	Judy George & George W. George	March 8, 1961	4120
Evans suspects a woman has let an innocent girl go to prison. Guest stars: Rhonda Fleming, Pat Li, J. Pat O'Malley
24	"Love, Honor and Perish"	Byron Paul	Donn Mullally	March 15, 1961	4124
Evans visits Macau to help find a woman's missing husband. Guest stars: Joan Caulfield, Warren Stevens, John Marley, Joseph Ruskin
25	"The Innocent Exile"	Fletcher Markle	Sam Ross	March 22, 1961	4125
Evans uses a young lady as a catspaw to track down a former dictator. Guest star: Susan Kohner, Jay Novello, Joe De Santis
26	"The Runaway"	Arthur Hiller	Robert Buckner	March 29, 1961	4126
A female sailor shoots her officer and runs to Evans for help. Guest stars: Gia Scala, Lawrence Dobkin
