= Jeffrey Stone =

American actor (1926–2012)

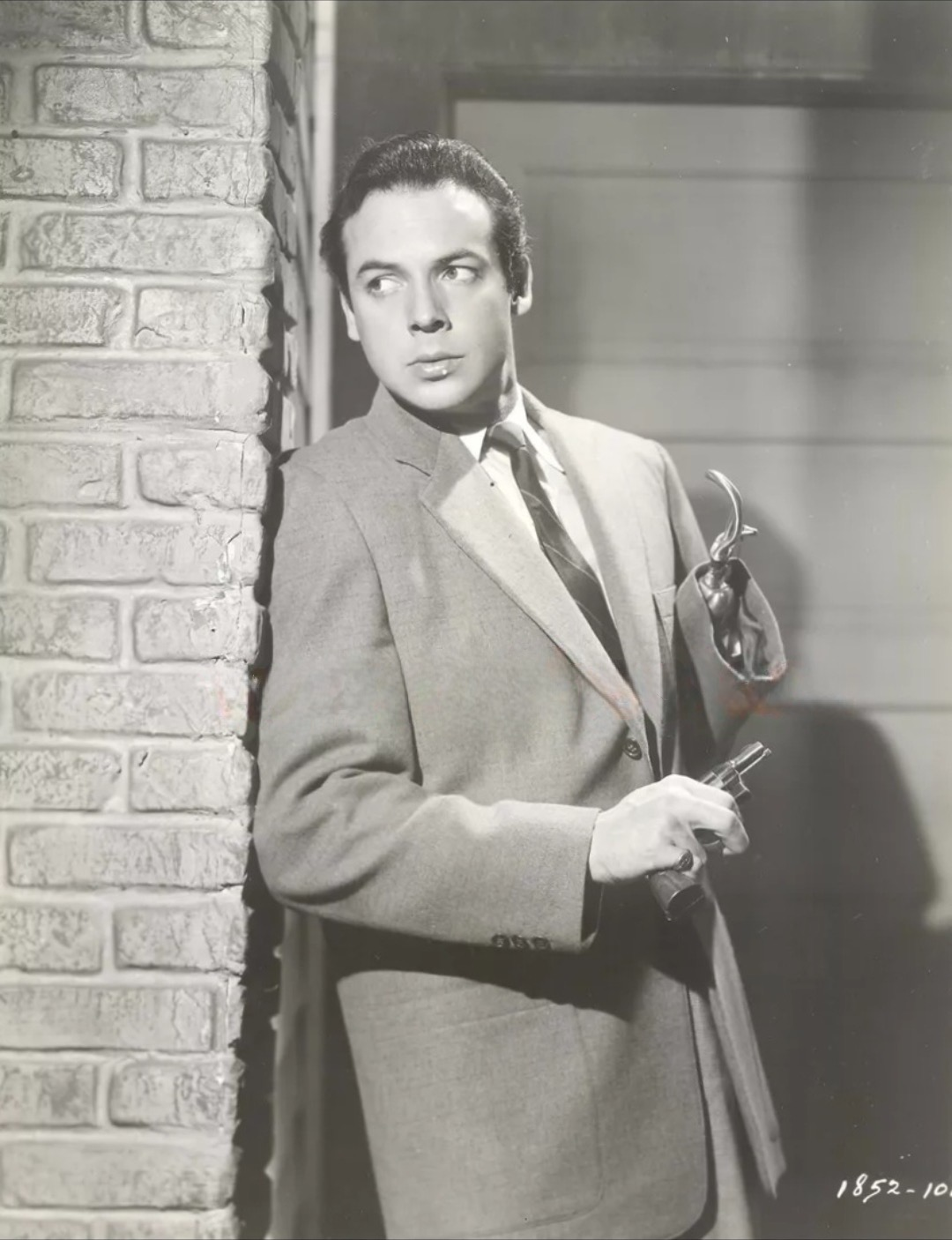
- Stone in The Girl in the Kremlin (1957)
- Born: John Forrest Fontaine; December 16, 1926; Detroit, Michigan, US
- Died: August 22, 2012 (aged 85); Penang, Malaysia
- Other name: John Fontaine
- Occupations: Actor, voice-over artist
- Years active: 1948–1966
- Spouses: Barbara Lawrence (m. 1947; div. 1948) Corinne Calvet (m. 1955; div. 1960) Christina Lee (m. 1965; div. 1972)

Jeffrey Stone (December 16, 1926 – August 22, 2012) was an American actor and voice-over artist. Stone was the model and inspiration for Prince Charming in the 1950 Walt Disney animated feature film, Cinderella. While he did not voice the character in the film, Stone did provide some of the film's additional voices.

== Early life ==
Stone was born John Forrest Fontaine on December 16, 1926, in Detroit, Michigan. He was raised in an Indiana orphanage throughout most of his early life after the death of his father. He enlisted at age 17 in the United States Navy during World War II.

== Career ==
After minor uncredited appearances in a pair of 1948 movies, Stone earned his first credit, under the stage name John Fontaine, with a voice role in Cinderella in 1950. His next film, and first credited on screen role, was the 1952 film Army Bound, again as John Fontaine. He then appeared in three films released in 1953—Fighter Attack, Bad for Each Other, starring Charlton Heston, and Wonder Valley—as well as the 1954 film noir, Drive a Crooked Road. During the later 1950s, Stone co-starred in Edge of Hell in 1956 and Zsa Zsa Gabor's The Girl in the Kremlin in 1957. He then appeared in four films released in 1958: The Big Beat, Damn Citizen, The Thing That Couldn't Die and Money, Women and Guns.

Stone's roles during the 1950s extended to television as well. In 1954, he starred in the Italian television series, I Tre moschettieri (The Three Musketeers) as D'Artagnan opposite Paul Campbell (as Aramis), Sebastian Cabot (as Porthos), and Domenico Modugno (as Athos). Individual episodes of the series were merged for release as feature films in European theaters including Knights of the Queen in 1954; The King's Musketeers and La Spada Imbattibile, both released in Europe in 1957; Le Imprese di Una Spada Leggendaria in 1958; and Mantelli Espade Insanguinate in 1959. Stone's other television credits included roles in Adventures in Paradise, The Outer Limits, The Californians, Johnny Midnight, and Surfside 6.

In 1960, he appeared in the comedic film, When the Girls Take Over. Stone also starred as Zorro in the 1960 Mexican Spanish film, El Jinete Solitario en El Valle de los Desaparecidos: La Venganza del Jinete Solitario. He wrote the story for the 1964 low-budget British sci-fi film, Unearthly Stranger. Stone wrote and directed Strange Portrait, a feature film that never saw a release.

=== Later career ===
Stone soon left the entertainment industry to travel in Southeast Asia and moved to Penang, Malaysia, during the early 1960s. He wrote several novels during his later life, including The Other Side of Rainbow and Letters to Rainbow.

In 2010, he published his autobiography, Whatever Happened To Prince Charming?.

== Personal life and death ==
Stone married actress Barbara Lawrence in 1947, which ended in divorce the following year. Stone then wed French actress Corinne Calvet, from 1955 to 1960, with whom he had one child. In 1965, he married Christina Lee, from whom he was divorced in 1972. Stone died at his home in Penang on August 22, 2012, at age 85.

== Filmography ==
Year	Title	Role	Notes
1948	You Were Meant for Me	Boy in Drugstore	Uncredited
1948	Train to Alcatraz	Husband	Uncredited
1950	Cinderella		Voice
1952	Army Bound	Lt. Peters	
1952	Battle Zone	Lt. Pilot	
1953	Fighter Attack	Lt. Gross	
1953	Bad for Each Other	Minor Role	Uncredited
1953	Wonder Valley	Power Lineman	
1953-56	Private Secretary	Jeff Richie	2 episodes
1954	Drive a Crooked Road	Wells	Uncredited
1956	Edge of Hell	Chauffeur	
1957	The Girl in the Kremlin	Mischa Rimilkin	
1958	The Californians	Tony Drake	2 episodes
1958	The Big Beat	Danny Phillips	
1958	Damn Citizen	Paul Musso	
1958	The Thing That Couldn't Die	Hank Huston	
1958	Money, Women and Guns	Johnny Bee	
1960	Adventures in Paradise	Dr. Drury	S1.E28: "The Death-Divers"
1960	Siempre en la arena		Spain/UK/USA co-production
1960	The Millionaire	Jim English	S6.E19: "Millionaire Janie Harris"
1960	Richard Diamond, Private Detective	Larry Manners	S3.E33: "Seven Swords"
1961	Surfside 6	Barney Michaels	S1.E25: "Inside Job"
1961	Death Valley Days	Dave Reid	S9.E16: "The Salt War"
1962	When the Girls Take Over	Steve Harding	Filmed in 1960
1964	The Outer Limits	The Cop	S2.E13: "The Duplicate Man"
