= Railroaded! =

1947 American film by Anthony Mann

- Theatrical release poster
- Directed by: Anthony Mann
- Screenplay by: John C. Higgins
- Story by: Gertrude Walker
- Produced by: Charles Reisner
- Starring: John Ireland; Sheila Ryan; Hugh Beaumont; Jane Randolph
- Cinematography: Guy Roe
- Edited by: Louis Sackin
- Music by: Alvin Levin
- Production company: Producers Releasing Corporation
- Distributed by: Eagle-Lion Films
- Release date: September 25, 1947 (United States)
- Running time: 72 minutes
- Country: United States
- Language: English
- Budget: $500,000

Railroaded! is a 1947 American crime film noir directed by Anthony Mann starring John Ireland, Sheila Ryan, Hugh Beaumont and Jane Randolph.

It was loosely based on the real-life case of Majczek and Marcinkiewicz, the same case that inspired Call Northside 777 (1948).

== Plot ==
Clara Calhoun is a beautician with a shop in New York. Her shop is in fact a front for a bookmaking operation. One evening when she closes up for the night, she gives a silent signal to two masked gunmen lurking outside. These two bandits then burst into the shop and hold up both Calhoun and her unsuspecting assistant, Marie Weston. The money they steal is betting money from the illegal operation.

During the robbery, a policeman on patrol in the neighborhood hears Weston's screams. He sees the hold up and tries to interrupt the robbery. As the policeman intervenes, he shoots one of the robbers, "Cowie" Kowalski, but is then shot and killed by the other robber, Duke Martin. The two robbers then escape the scene in a laundry truck, and Martin drops off Kowalski at a doctor's house for medical care. Before leaving Martin reminds Kowalski of the plan to implicate a certain Steve Ryan in the crime.

Later on, Calhoun and Weston are interrogated by detectives Mickey Ferguson and Jim Chubb. Weston describes both robbers as black-haired, but Calhoun insists that one of them, the "shooter", had sandy hair. Calhoun's version is believed, and soon the sandy-haired Steve Ryan, who usually drives the laundry truck and whose Navy scarf was found at the shop, is found and brought in for questioning. After a round of tough questioning by Ferguson and Chubb, Steve Ryan is then taken to a hospital, where Kowalski identifies him as the killer.

Steve Ryan claims that he is being framed by Kowalski for something he didn't do. He says the reason for this is that he beat up Kowalski for making a pass at his sister Rosie Ryan. But the detectives don't believe his story. Calhoun too confirms Kowalski's identification, and the unfortunate Steve Ryan is arrested. His sister Rosie is sure of her brother's innocence.

Rosie pleads her brother's case to detective Ferguson, but he is quite convinced of Steve Ryan's guilt and intends to perform a thorough investigation. Calhoun, who has come up with the robbery scheme together with Martin, her boyfriend, starts drinking heavily, angering Martin.

When it turns out Kowalski dies from his gunshot wound, Rosie Ryan goes over to Calhoun's apartment and confronts her about her identification. A fight ensues between the two women. Martin watches the fight while hiding, and afterwards he enters the room and tells Calhoun he will "straighten out" Weston before Rosie Ryan talks with her. Martin also tells Calhoun that she should lie low until Steve's trial. Rosie Ryan goes straight to Weston's beauty shop but is unable to find her. Also looking for Weston is Ferguson, who offers Rosie a ride home. On the way, Ferguson confesses his doubts about Steve Ryan's guilt.

Rosie Ryan receives a message from Martin, telling her to come to the Club Bombay, which he manages. Rosie Ryan goes to meet Martin at the club, and in the meantime Ferguson breaks into and inspects Calhoun's now-deserted apartment. He finds a photograph of Martin, which connects the two. He goes to the club to question Martin about his relation to Calhoun.

Martin suggests to Rosie Ryan that he knows who is framing Steve Ryan, and Rosie denounces Ferguson in front of Martin. Ferguson warns Rosie to stay away from Martin. However, she is determined to do anything to get her brother off the hook, and puts more trust in Martin. Martin reveals to Calhoun his intent to rob Jacklin Ainsworth, Calhoun's gambling boss and the owner of Club Bombay. In an attempt to discover the relation between Calhoun and Martin, Ferguson waits outside Calhoun's hideout apartment. When Martin appears and is about to enter the building, Ferguson makes his presence known to him.

Martin accuses Calhoun of double-crossing him. He then runs off, and Ferguson goes inside and tells her that Weston has been found dead in the river. He advises Calhoun to call him later at Rosie Ryan's house for her own protection. Meanwhile Martin persuades an alcoholic named Wino to confess to the robbery in exchange for money. He assures Rosie that Wino's statements will get Steve Ryan out of jail.

Rosie buys the whole concept and goes home to get money to pay Wino. Martin goes back to Calhoun's apartment, but she isn't there. He discovers the frightened Calhoun calling Ferguson from a drugstore. Calhoun arranges to meet Ferguson at her apartment, but before the detective arrives Martin shoots her. Martin then goes to Club Bombay, where he shoots and robs Ainsworth. Aware that Calhoun had called Rosie's phone number, Martin waits for her at the club and accuses her of betraying him.

Just when Martin is about to shoot Rosie, Ferguson arrives with the police, having ordered a raid on the club. In the ensuing commotion, Martin manages to fire at Rosie and wound her. Martin is then killed in a shootout with Ferguson. Steve Ryan is at last released from jail. Ferguson and Rosie kiss.

== Cast ==
- John Ireland as Duke Martin
- Ed Kelly as Steve Ryan
- Sheila Ryan as Rosie Ryan
- Hugh Beaumont as Mickey Ferguson
- Jane Randolph as Clara Calhoun
- Charles D. Brown as Police Capt. MacTaggart
- Clancy Cooper as Detective Jim Chubb
- Peggy Converse as Marie Weston
- Hermine Sterler as Mrs. Ryan
- Keefe Brasselle as Cowie Kowalski
- Roy Gordon as Jackland Ainsworth

== Production ==
The film was shot in ten days.

== Reception ==
=== Critical response ===
Monthly Film Bulletin said "The film offers no surprises, as the identity of the killer is revealed in the early sequences, and it relies for its chief interest on the efforts of Ferguson to identify and trap the criminal. The dramatic quality is well sustained."

Critic Roger Westcombe praised the film, writing, "It's a standard frame-up story, solidified through the strength of Mann's directing skills beyond the merits of the material. Preceding his now legendary teaming with cinematographer John Alton for the unbeatable run of Raw Deal, T-Men, Border Incident, and He Walked by Night, Railroaded! is still very dark but grim. The absence of Alton's breathtaking set-ups pedestrianises this effort into something merely heavy-handed. Mann's transitional work Desperate (1947), also pre-Alton, gained an edge of complexity through Raymond Burr's latent menace and a more nuanced study of human corruption than is found here. Yet for all these shortcomings Railroaded's tension is remarkably well maintained, primarily due to the acting of all the principals."

Film critic Dennis Schwartz, gave the film a mixed review, writing, "A second-rate crime thriller made before Anthony Mann (Desperate) reached prime time. Railroaded is a well-crafted and fast-paced mystery tale. It's a low-budget film noir that is held together by John Ireland's nasty performance as the heartless villain without redemption ... The plot was uninteresting and predictable, while the acting was so-so."

Leslie Halliwell said: "A new post-war toughness was evident in this sharply-made second feature."

The Radio Times Guide to Films gave the film 3/5 stars, writing: "Anthony Mann brings a sure touch to this low-budget crime B-movie. Innocent youngster Ed Kelly is framed for murder by psychopathic professional John Ireland, whose penchant is spraying bullets with perfume before discharging them into his victims. Although formula stuff, it's taut, coolly violent and very tough, particularly in its treatment of female characters."
