= Hannah Lee =

1953 film by Lee Garmes and John Ireland

- Directed by: Lee Garmes; John Ireland
- Written by: MacKinlay Kantor, Alford Van Ronkel
- Produced by: Jack Broder, Lee Garmes, John Ireland
- Starring: Macdonald Carey; Joanne Dru; John Ireland
- Cinematography: Lee Garmes
- Edited by: Chester Schaffer
- Music by: Paul Dunlap
- Distributed by: Realart Pictures
- Release date: June 27, 1953
- Running time: 75 minutes
- Country: United States
- Language: English

Hannah Lee (also known as Outlaw Territory and Hannah Lee: An American Primitive) is a 1953 American Western film directed by Lee Garmes and John Ireland. It was originally filmed in stereoscopic 3-D Pathécolor using the twin-Camerette 3-D system by Stereo-Cine Corp.

Based on the novel "Wicked Water" by MacKinlay Kantor.

== Plot ==
Bus Crow (Macdonald Carey), a professional gunfighter from Texas, arrives in Pearl City looking for work. After slapping around a boy who offers to watch his horse and shooting someone over a small slight at the local saloon, he makes quite an impression on the locals. This leads to his being hired by powerful ranchers to convince squatters to leave the area. U.S. Marshal Sam Rochelle (John Ireland) is brought in to investigate subsequent murders and immediately suspects Crow.

== Cast ==
- Joanne Dru, as Hannah
- Macdonald Carey, as Crow
- John Ireland, as Marshal Rochelle
- Frank Ferguson, as John Britton
- Tom Powers, as the town sheriff
