= Jane Randolph =

American actress (1914–2009)

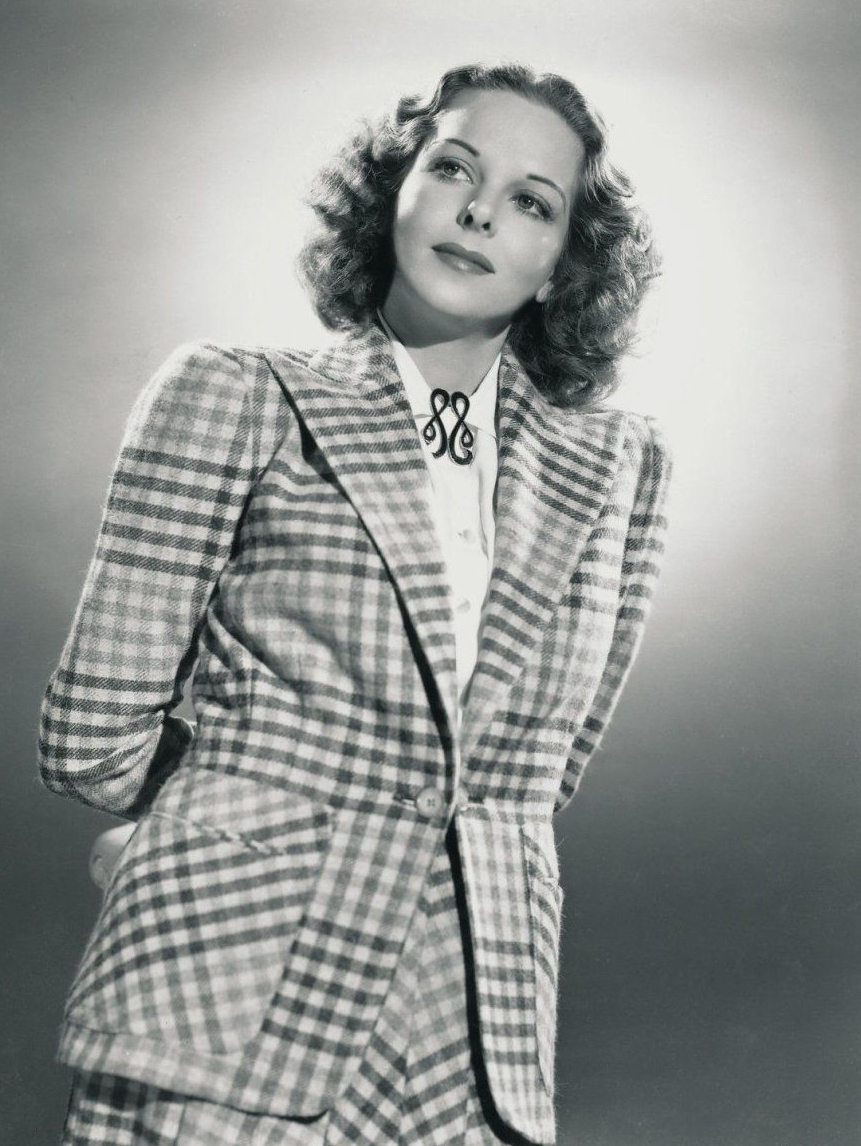
- Randolph c. 1940s
- Born: Jane Roemer; October 30, 1914; Youngstown, Ohio, U.S.
- Died: May 4, 2009 (aged 94); Gstaad, Switzerland
- Education: DePauw University
- Years active: 1941–1955
- Spouses: Bert D'Armand (div. 1949) Jaime del Amo (m. 1949–1966)

Jane Randolph (née Roemer; October 30, 1914 – May 4, 2009), was an American film actress. She is best known for her portrayals of Alice Moore in the 1942 horror film Cat People, and its sequel, The Curse of the Cat People (1944).

== Biography ==
=== Early life ===
Randolph was born October 30, 1914 (Note: Obituaries for Randolph state she was born October 30, 1915, but the United States Social Security Death Index lists her birth year as 1914.) in Youngstown, Ohio, into a rich steelmaking family. She grew up in Kokomo, Indiana, where she played golf and flew airplanes. She studied medicine at DePauw University, where she was a member of Kappa Alpha Theta, then acting with Max Reinhardt.

Randolph is the first cousin once removed of the writer John McPhee.

=== Film career ===
In 1939, Randolph moved to Hollywood. In 1941, picked up by Warner Bros. her first part was a hatcheck girl in Manpower.

In 1942, RKO picked up the contract of the poised actress and she received a leading lady role in Highways by Night (1942). She became known for her roles in film noir, which included Jealousy (1945) and Railroaded! (1947), and in two of Val Lewton's now well regarded B-picture horror films, Cat People (1942) and The Curse of the Cat People (1944). Her last credited film role was Abbott and Costello Meet Frankenstein (1948).

=== Later life ===
Randolf married then divorced Hollywood agent Bert D'Armand; in 1949, she married Jaime de Amo, later Governor of Madrid, grandson of Manuel Dominguez, retired to Spain and became a socialite. In later years she returned to Los Angeles periodically, but maintained a home in Gstaad.

The trade publication Billboard reported that Randolph and del Amo were married April 20, 1948, in Las Vegas, Nevada. An additional source says that she and Del Amo were married in Las Vegas in 1948, and that it was her second marriage.

== Death ==
Randolph died in Gstaad from complications of a broken hip, aged 94.

== Filmography ==
Year	Title	Role	Notes
1941	Manpower	Hat Check Girl	Uncredited
1941	Dive Bomber	Singer (song "What's New")	Uncredited
1941	One Foot in Heaven	Mother	Uncredited
1942	The Male Animal	Secretary	Uncredited
1942	The Falcon's Brother	Marcia Brooks	
1942	Highways by Night	Peggy Fogarty	
1942	Cat People	Alice Moore	
1943	The Falcon Strikes Back	Marcia Brooks	
1944	The Curse of the Cat People	Alice Reed	
1944	In the Meantime, Darling	Mrs. Jerry Armstrong	
1945	A Sporting Chance	Pamela Herrick	
1945	Jealousy	Janet Urban	
1946	In Fast Company	Marian McCormick	
1946	The Mysterious Mr. M	Marina Lamont	
1946	Fool's Gold	Jessie Dixon	
1947	Railroaded!	Clara Calhoun	
1947	T-Men	Diana Simpson	
1948	Open Secret	Nancy Lester	
1948	Abbott and Costello Meet Frankenstein	Joan Raymond	
1955	That Lady	Extra	Uncredited, (final film role)

== Sources ==
- Mank, Gregory William (2005). Women in Horror Films, 1940s. Jefferson, North Carolina: McFarland. ISBN 978-0-7864-2335-4.
