= Open Secret =

1948 film by John Reinhardt

- Theatrical release poster
- Directed by: John Reinhardt
- Written by: Henry Blankfort; Max Wilk
- Story by: Ted Murkland; Max Wilk
- Produced by: Harry Brandt; Frank Satenstein
- Starring: John Ireland; Jane Randolph
- Cinematography: George Robinson
- Edited by: Stanley Frazen
- Music by: Herschel Burke Gilbert
- Distributed by: Eagle-Lion Films
- Release date: January 31, 1948 (United States)
- Running time: 69 minutes
- Country: United States
- Language: English

Open Secret is a 1948 American film noir directed by John Reinhardt, starring John Ireland and Jane Randolph.

== Plot ==
Newlyweds Paul Lester (Ireland) and his wife Nancy (Randolph) are invited to visit Paul's friend Ed Stevens. They arrive to find Stevens gone and a mysterious phone call gets Paul to the other end of town. While he's away, Nancy is assaulted by a would-be burglar. Paul thinks there's something more going on than a missing persons case or a burglary and tries to interest Police Detective Frontelli (Leonard) in looking into it, but Frontelli is initially skeptical.

When Stevens turns up under the wheels of a truck along with evidence tying him to an earlier hit-and-run murder, Paul is certain that there's some kind of organized conspiracy afoot. What he finds is a town slowly coming under siege from a secret band of anti-Semitic thugs masquerading as a patriotic organization, with whom Stevens had been involved and tried to quit. Paul and Nancy's situation goes from bad to dangerous when they accidentally stumble upon evidence that could hang the murderers.

== Cast ==
- John Ireland as Paul Lester
- Jane Randolph as Nancy Lester
- Roman Bohnen as Roy Locke
- Sheldon Leonard as Sergeant Mike Frontelli
- George Tyne as Harry Strauss
- Morgan Farley as Larry Mitchell, also known as Phillips
- Ellen Lowe as Mae Locke
- Anne O'Neal as Mrs. Tristram
- Arthur O'Connell as Carter
- John Alvin as Ralph

== Production notes ==
Some of the music cues from the original soundtrack by Herschel Burke Gilbert were re-used in Season One of the 1950s television series Adventures of Superman.
