= A Walk in the Sun (1945 film) =

1945 film by Lewis Milestone

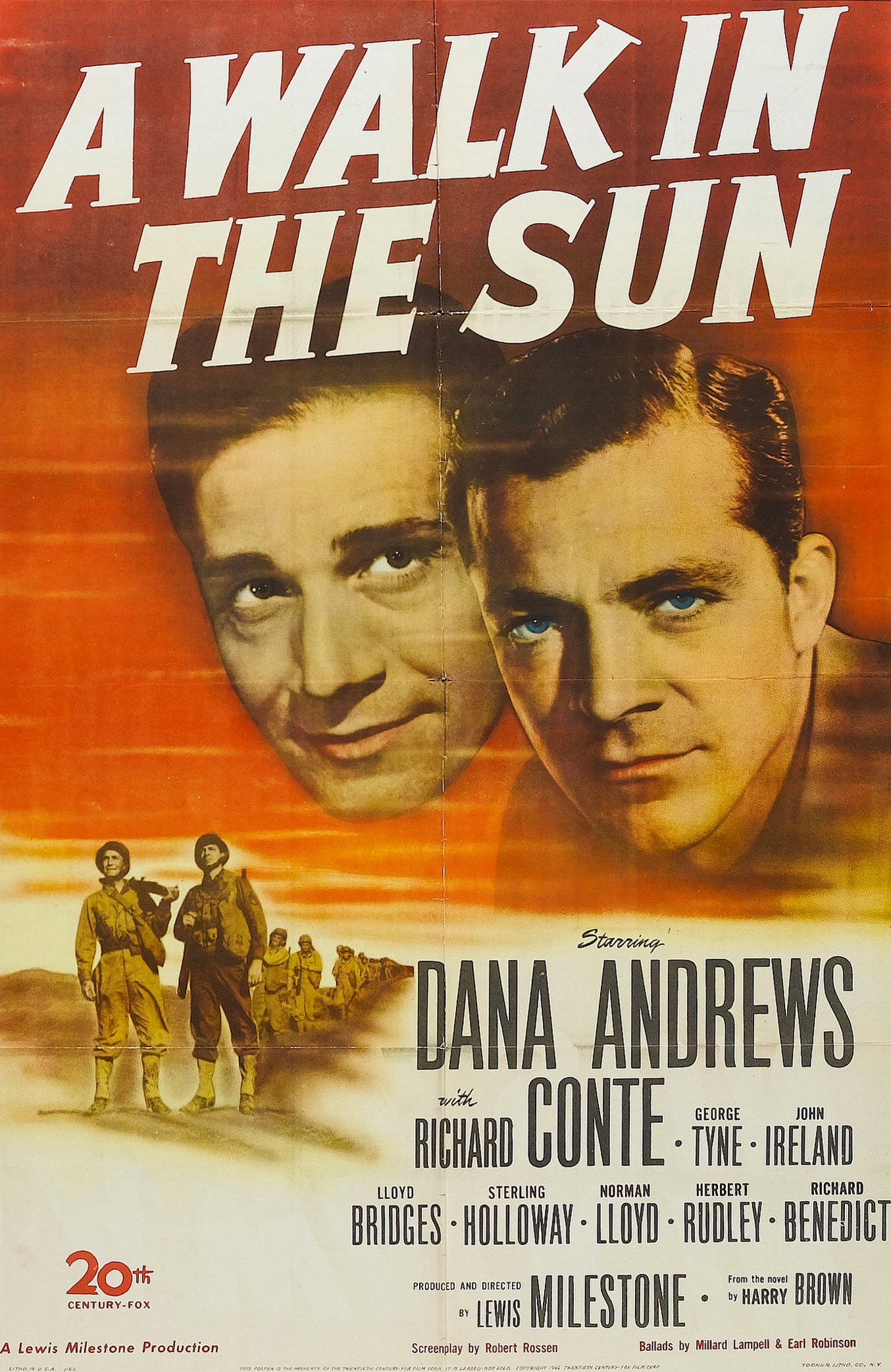
- Theatrical release poster
- Directed by: Lewis Milestone
- Screenplay by: Robert Rossen
- Based on: A Walk in the Sun; 1944 novel by Harry Brown
- Produced by: Lewis Milestone; Samuel Bronston (uncredited)
- Starring: Dana Andrews; Richard Conte; George Tyne; John Ireland; Lloyd Bridges; Sterling Holloway; Norman Lloyd; Herbert Rudley; Richard Benedict
- Cinematography: Russell Harlan
- Edited by: W. Duncan Mansfield
- Music by: Score: Fredric Efrem Rich; Songs: Millard Lampell; Earl Robinson
- Production company: Superior Productions
- Distributed by: 20th Century Fox
- Release date: December 3, 1945
- Running time: 117 minutes
- Country: United States
- Language: English
- Budget: $850,000 or $1,250,000
- Box office: $1,600,000 or $2,250,000

A Walk in the Sun is a 1945 American war film based on the novel by Harry Brown, who was a writer for Yank, the Army Weekly based in England. The book was serialized in Liberty Magazine in October 1944.

The film was directed by Lewis Milestone, stars Dana Andrews and features Richard Conte, George Tyne, John Ireland, Lloyd Bridges, Sterling Holloway, Norman Lloyd, Herbert Rudley and Richard Benedict, with narration by Burgess Meredith.

In 2016, the film was deemed "culturally, historically, or aesthetically significant" by the United States Library of Congress, and selected for preservation in its National Film Registry.

== Plot ==
In 1943 during WWII, the lead platoon of the Texas Division is delivered by landing craft to a beach near Salerno, Italy. They make their way to a nearby wooded area, by which time their lieutenant, platoon sergeant, and medic have been killed, leaving in command Sergeant Eddie Porter, assisted by Sergeants Tyne and Ward.

Their mission is to blow up a bridge and occupy a farmhouse, six miles away. They are wary of enemy tanks and planes, and have some encounters. Sgt. Porter has a mental breakdown and Tyne takes command.

They reach a stone wall within sight of the farmhouse, which they discover is occupied by the enemy. Tyne sends two patrols, led by Sgt. Ward and Pvt. Windy Craven, down to the river to get past the farm to the bridge, while the rest of the platoon keeps the enemy occupied at the front of the farmhouse. When the bridge is blown up, the entire platoon charges the farmhouse and overwhelms the enemy.

During the film there is some combat, but much of the story takes place between skirmishes, within the interactions and banter of the soldiers.

== Cast ==
- Dana Andrews as Staff Sgt. Bill Tyne
- Richard Conte as Pvt. Rivera
- George Tyne as Pvt. Jake Friedman
- John Ireland as PFC. Windy Craven
- Lloyd Bridges as Staff Sgt. Ward
- Sterling Holloway as Pvt. 'Mac' McWilliams
- Norman Lloyd as Pvt. Jack 'Arch' Archimbeau
- Herbert Rudley as Staff Sgt. Eddie Porter
- Richard Benedict as PFC. Tranella
- Huntz Hall as PFC. Carraway
- James Cardwell as Sgt. 'Hosk' Hoskins
- George Offerman Jr. as Pvt. Tinker
- Steve Brodie as Pvt. Judson
- Matt Willis as Plt. Sgt. Pete 'Hal' Halverson
- Chris Drake as PFC. Tim Rankin
- Alvin Hammer as Pvt. Johnson
- Victor Cutler as Pvt. Cousins
- Jay Norris as Pvt. James
- John Kellogg as Pvt. Riddle

Uncredited Cast

- Danny Desmond as Pvt. Trasker
- Robert Horton as Pvt. Joe Jack
- Tony Dante as Pvt. Giorgio
- Robert Lowell as Lt. Rand
- Burgess Meredith as Narrator

== Production ==
Actor Burgess Meredith, who eventually narrated the film, persuaded his friend Samuel Bronston to produce a film based on the book by Harry Brown. Due to problems with creditors, Bronston had to shut down production and the project was taken over by Superior Productions, which included the director Lewis Milestone Bronston filed a lawsuit, and in an out-of-court settlement received 21.25% of the film's profits. The film was shot at 20th Century Fox's ranch, alongside that studio's production of A Bell for Adano.

The Army assigned Colonel Thomas D. Drake to the film as technical advisor. Drake had risen from private to sergeant in World War I. He was later commissioned and eventually commanded the 168th Infantry Regiment of the 34th Infantry Division in the North African campaign, where he and his regiment were captured by the Germans at the Battle of Kasserine Pass. Drake had recently been exchanged as a prisoner by the Germans due to his ill health, returning to the States in 1944.

Because of war-time shortages, US vehicles and aircraft stand in as enemy vehicles; most notably an American half-track is painted as a German half-track, and a P-51 plays the role of an "enemy" aircraft (probably intended to be either a C.205 or Bf 109). Later, P-38s (as American aircraft) engage a radial engined "enemy" plane (a T-6 Texan posing as a Fw 190) during the film's climax.

In January 1945, Milestone showed the film to the U.S. Army for their approval. The Army was pleased with the film but requested two changes.

The Army requested a briefing scene at the film's beginning to explain the platoon's mission. They believed the film gave the impression that the platoon meandered about without an objective. Milestone authorized the shooting of such a scene but whether it was filmed but later edited out of the release no one is sure; however, a brief scene in the landing craft has the platoon sergeant explaining to the men, and the audience, that they had been briefed on their mission.

Secondly, the Army suggested that a remark be placed in the film explaining why the bazooka was not used during the attack on the farmhouse. Milestone complied with this request by shooting a scene where the bazooka crew reported that they used up all their shells in a battle with enemy tanks.

Though several film companies showed strong interest in acquiring the film, 20th Century Fox acquired the film for release in July 1945 so as not to compete with Fox's A Bell for Adano released earlier. However, when Japan surrendered, Fox's head of production, Darryl F. Zanuck, stopped production of all war films. The film was released in June 1946 to critical and popular acclaim but also a strong critique of the film from future director and veteran of the Italian campaign Samuel Fuller, which he sent in the form of a letter to Milestone.

Robert Rossen's screenplay follows Brown's book very closely. Milestone also recommended that Brown become a screenwriter in Hollywood, which led to a prolific career.

== Soundtrack ==
Milestone commissioned ballads from Millard Lampell and Earl Robinson to accompany the action at intervals throughout the film. The songs, which were sung by Kenneth Spencer, replaced much of composer Freddie Rich's original instrumental score. The ballad in A Walk in the Sun predates the ballad in High Noon, which also accompanied the film's narrative. Robinson and Lampell wrote other ballads that were deleted from the final print of the film due to objections, not only from composer Rich, but due to the comments of several preview audiences, who did not like the songs.

Songs composed for the film include:

- Ballad of the Lead Platoon
- Texas Division
- Waiting
- One Little Job
- The Platoon Started Out
- Six-Mile Walk
- Trouble A-Coming
- Texas Division Blues
- They Met Hitler's Best
- Moving In
- Black and White
- Walk in the Sun

Traditional music:

- The Army Goes Rolling Along by Edmund L. Gruber

== Reception ==
The review in PM was both extensive and positive: "A Walk in the Sun is so different—materially and intentionally—from any other film dramatization of the war that it is difficult to judge it by the usual standards of comparison. Yet it seems to be the most satisfying of the soldier films—the most convincing in its portraiture of the U.S. soldier, the least contrived in plot and characterization and the first war film to attempt successfully a style and composition of its own....Yet it is not the theme ballad, nor the sparse though mighty excitement of the film's moments of combat, that make [it] a memorable film. Rather it is most distinguished for the real and comradely relationships among men of varying origins and modes of life, for its vital and sparkling dialogue...and for its unaccented tribute to the resourcefulness of the American soldier, working out battle problems with the co-operation and efficiency of a smart football team."

Realart Pictures Inc. re-release lobby card

In The Nation in 1946, critic James Agee wrote, "A Walk in the Sun is often very alive and likeable, thanks to several of its players ... But mainly, I think, it is an embarrassing movie. The dialogue seems as unreal as it is expert. Most of the characters—as distinct from the men who play them—are as unreal and literary as the dialogue. The aesthetic and literary and pseudo-democratic preoccupations are so strong that at times all sense of plain reality drops out of the picture." Leslie Halliwell gave it three of four stars: "Vivid war film in a minor key, superbly disciplined and keenly acted." Pauline Kael took issue with it: "This account of an American infantry platoon in Italy has a great big inexplicable reputation. Maybe people were impressed by its serious and poetic intentions ... But this is the kind of literate movie that is more impressive than enjoyable."

== Re-release ==
A Walk in the Sun was reissued by Realart Pictures in 1951 as Salerno Beachhead. In the 1980s, the film was released on VHS tape.

In 2022, A Walk in the Sun was reissued after restoration by the UCLA Film & Television Archive in cooperation with the British Film Institute using a 35mm nitrate fine grain master positive and a 35mm acetate composite dupe negative. It was issued on Blu-Ray disc by Kit Parker Films.
