= Jealousy (1945 film) =

1945 film by Gustav Machatý

- Theatrical release poster
- Directed by: Gustav Machatý
- Screenplay by: Gustav Machatý; Arnold Lippschitz
- Story by: Dalton Trumbo
- Produced by: Gustav Machatý
- Starring: John Loder; Jane Randolph; Karen Morley; Nils Asther
- Cinematography: Henry Sharp
- Edited by: John F. Link Sr.
- Music by: Hanns Eisler
- Production company: Republic Pictures
- Distributed by: Republic Pictures
- Release date: July 23, 1945 (United States)
- Running time: 71 minutes
- Country: United States
- Language: English

Jealousy is a 1945 American film noir crime film directed by Gustav Machatý starring John Loder, Jane Randolph, Karen Morley and Nils Asther.

== Plot ==
A successful alcoholic writer is murdered and his wife is accused.

== Cast ==
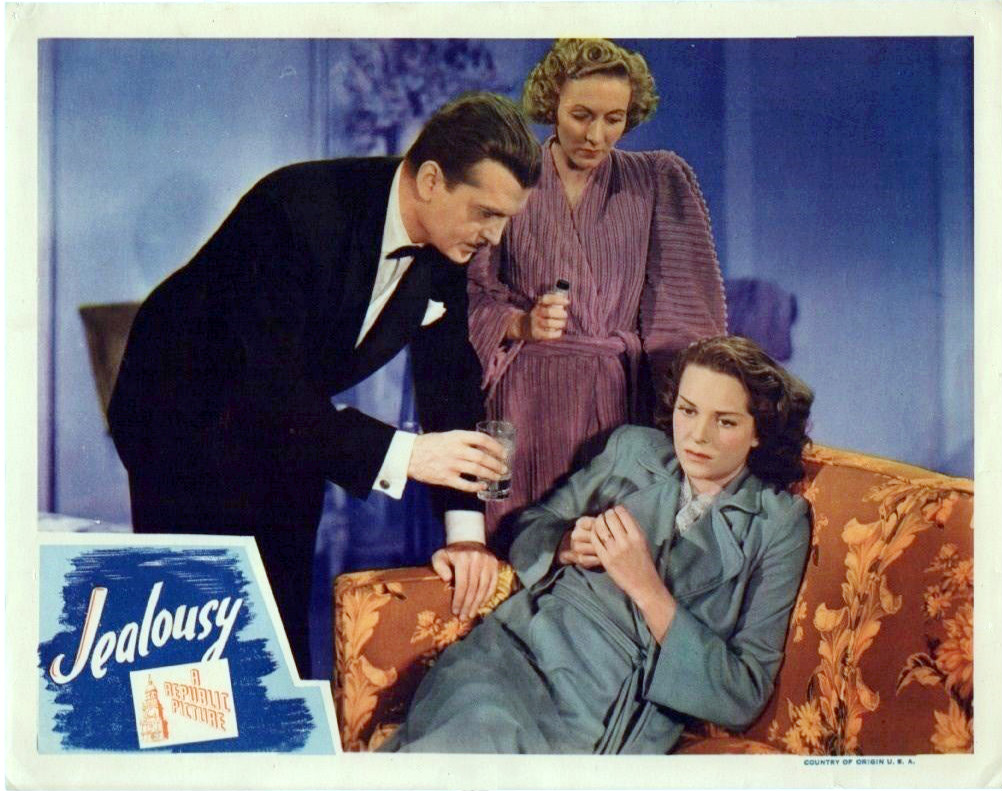
Lobby card

- John Loder as Dr. David Brent
- Jane Randolph as Janet Urban
- Karen Morley as Dr. Monica Anderson
- Nils Asther as Peter Urban
- Hugo Haas as Hugo Kral
- Holmes Herbert as Melvyn Russell
- Michael Mark as Shop Owner
- Mauritz Hugo as Bob
- Kid Chissell as Expressman

== Reception ==
=== Critical response ===
Film critic Leonard Maltin did not like the film, writing, "[A] whodunit set in L.A. that, after a promising start, descends into mediocrity. Machaty's touch is still evident in unusual camera shots and montages."
