= Peggy Converse =

American actress

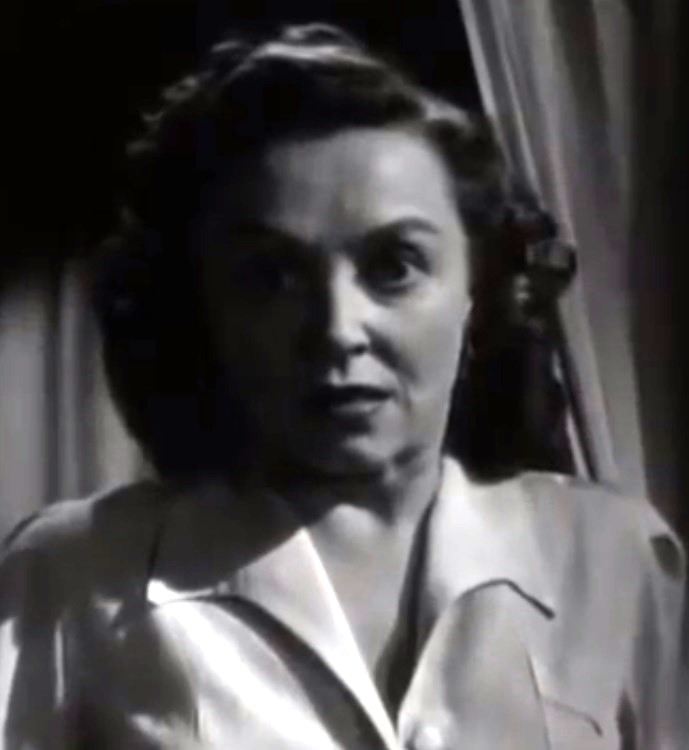
- Converse in the 1947 film noir Railroaded!
- Born: April 3, 1905; Oregon City, Oregon, U.S.
- Died: March 2, 2001 (aged 95); Los Angeles, California, U.S.
- Education: Stanford University
- Occupation: Actress
- Years active: 1921–1988
- Spouse(s): Edmund Converse (m. 1928, divorced) Don Porter (m. 1944; died 1997)
- Children: 2

Peggy Converse (April 3, 1905 – March 2, 2001), born Velma Randall, was an American stage, film, and television actress whose lengthy career spanned seven decades.

== Early years ==
Born in Oregon City, Oregon, Converse was the daughter of Mr. and Mrs. Frederick Randall. She graduated from Stanford University in 1927. While there she participated in plays and vaudeville programs and was a member of Pi Beta Phi sorority.

== Career ==
Converse began acting at the age of 16 in Los Angeles. She played ingénue parts in the 1920s and 1930s in Broadway productions of Infernal Machine and The Comedy of Good and Evil. She toured the country, playing 100 roles in productions in over 1000 theaters across the United States and Canada, often with her second husband, fellow actor Don Porter. Her film career started in 1942, with an uncredited part in My Sister Eileen, and concluded with 1988's The Accidental Tourist. She also made guest appearances on television shows from the 1950s to the 1980s, including the unaired pilot episode of Mister Ed.

== Personal life and death ==
She married Edmund Converse, the founder of Bonanza Air Lines, in Paris in the fall of 1928. After they divorced, she married Porter. Their marriage lasted 53 years, until his death in 1997. They had two children. She died on March 2, 2001, in her Los Angeles home, aged 95.

== Stage credits ==
- Infernal Machine (?)
- The Comedy of Good and Evil (?)
- Miss Quis (1937) as Crickett
- Wuthering Heights (1939) as Isabel Linton

== Filmography ==
- My Sister Eileen (1942) as Receptionist (uncredited)
- Good Luck, Mr. Yates (1943) as Amy Wallace (uncredited)
- The Girl of the Limberlost (1945) as Jessie Reed
- Just Before Dawn (1946) as Connie Day (uncredited)
- The Brute Man (1946) as Mrs. Obringer (uncredited)
- Railroaded! (1947) as Marie Weston
- Rusty Leads the Way (1948) as Mrs. Waters
- The Devil's Henchman (1949) as Connie
- Father Is a Bachelor (1950) as Genevieve Cassin
- Borderline (1950) as Suspect Questioned (uncredited)
- The Family Secret (1951) as Sybil Bradley
- Miss Sadie Thompson (1953) as Mrs. Margaret Davidson
- They Rode West (1954) as Mrs. Martha Walters
- Drum Beat (1954) as Mrs. Ulysses S. Grant
- The Pepsi-Cola Playhouse (1954) (episode "The Grey and Gold Dress) as Jane
- City Detective (1954) (episode "Why Should the Beautiful Die") as Jane
- Cavalcade of America (1955) (episode "Stay on Stranger") as Mrs. Alice Lloyd
- The Loretta Young Show (1955) (episode "The Flood") as Louella Ryan
- Studio 57 (1955) (episode "The Engagement Ring")
- You Are There (1956) (episode "The Heroism of Clara Barton (September 17, 1862)") as Clara Barton
- Telephone Time (1956) (episode "The Joyful Lunatic")
- Panic! (1957) (episode "The Priest") as Mrs. Oliver
- Perry Mason (TV series) (1957) (episode "The Case of the Vagabond Vixen") as Myrtle Northrup
- Day of the Badman (1958) as Mrs. Quary
- The Thing That Couldn't Die (1958) as Flavia McIntyre
- Voice in the Mirror (1958) as Mrs. Harriet Cunningham
- Mike Hammer (1958) (episode "A Grave Undertaking") as Margaret Reed
- Alfred Hitchcock Presents (1960) (episode "Backward, Turn Backward") as Mrs. Lyons
- Perry Mason (TV series) (1960) (episode "The Case of the Treacherous Toupee") as Sybil Basset
- Mister Ed (1961) (Unaired pilot episode "The Wonderful World of Wilbur Pope") as Mrs. Bagby
- The Danny Thomas Show (1964) (episode "The Antique Dealer") as Fred's Wife
- Insight (TV series) (1974) (episode "When You See Arcturus") as Mother
- Future Cop (TV series) (1977) (episode "Cops and Robin") as Housekeeper
- Cops and Robin (1978 TV movie) as Housekeeper
- Turnabout (TV series) (1979) (episode "Till Dad Do Us Part") as Hannah
- The Ropers (1979) (episode "Days of Beer and Rosie") as Mrs. Hollingsworth
- The Best Place to Be (1979 TV movie) as Jean Callahan
- The Chisholms (1980) (episode "The Siren Song") as Mrs. Gilroy
- Days of Our Lives (1981) (seven episodes) as Mother Superior
- General Hospital (1982) (March 22 episode) as Mrs. Calhoun
- This Is the Life (TV series) (1982) (episode "The Visitation") as Mrs. Caldwell
- Small Wonder (TV series) (1986) (episode "The Grandparents") as Grandma Lawson
- The Accidental Tourist (1988) as Mrs. Barrett
