= George Tyne =

American actor

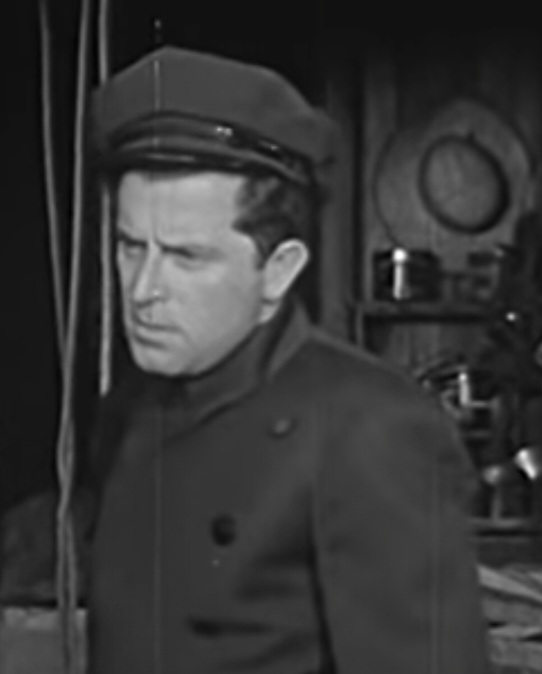
- Tyne in Rolling Home (1946)
- Born: Martin Yarus; February 6, 1917; Philadelphia, Pennsylvania, U.S.
- Died: March 7, 2008 (aged 91); Los Angeles, California, U.S.
- Resting place: Westwood Village Memorial Park Cemetery
- Other name: Buddy Yarus
- Occupations: Actor, director
- Years active: 1967–1981
- Known for: A Walk in the Sun
- Spouse: Ethel Tyne (?-2003) (her death)

Martin Yarus (February 6, 1917 – March 7, 2008), better known as George Tyne, was an American stage and film actor and television director. He was blacklisted in 1951.

== Early life ==
Tyne was born Martin Yarus in Philadelphia, Pennsylvania to Charles and Mollie Yarus, who emigrated from Russia. Early in life he moved with his parents to Brooklyn, N.Y., where he attended James Madison High School.

== Career ==
Tyne began his acting career under the name Buddy Yarus. He used that name when appearing in the 1945 war film Objective Burma!, and in the Laurel and Hardy film The Dancing Masters (1943). As "George Tyne" he appeared in A Walk in the Sun, Sands of Iwo Jima and Thieves Highway.

Tyne also appeared on Broadway in a number of roles, including the hit 1954 play Lunatics and Lovers.

Prior to his blacklisting, Tyne's last movie role was in the 1951 war film Decision Before Dawn. During the period of his blacklisting he worked mainly as a stage actor. He appeared in supporting roles in the 1954 off-Broadway revival of Threepenny Opera, the 1954 comedy Lunatics and Lovers, and Romanoff and Juliet (1957).

Tyne's film and television career picked up in the mid-1960s. He moved to the west coast and worked as an actor in small roles and as a television director.

Tyne directed episodes of The Love Boat, The Paul Lynde Show, M*A*S*H* and the 1979 TV series Friends. He returned to acting, in small roles, in TV shows and movies in the 1960s. His last film role was a bit part in the 1984 film, The Lonely Guy. In the early 1990s, he taught directing courses at the California Institute of the Arts.

=== Blacklisting and prosecution ===
Tyne was blacklisted from the movies in 1951 and from television in 1952, after his name was publicized in congressional committee hearings into alleged Communist infiltration of the entertainment industry.

In August 1955, the House Un-American Activities Committee held hearings in New York City to probe alleged Communist infiltration of Broadway, radio and television. Tyne, then appearing in the Broadway play Lunatics and Lovers, was one of seven witnesses who refused to answer questions about whether they had been members of the Communist Party. Six cited their right to avoid self-incrimination under the Fifth Amendment to the U.S. Constitution, but Tyne, Pete Seeger and Elliott Sullivan simply refused to answer, which resulted in their receiving contempt of Congress citations.

In his testimony, Tyne called actor Lee J. Cobb a "stool pigeon" for naming him as part of a "Communist group" in Hollywood in 1943. Tyne refused to say whether he knew Cobb, and said, "I think the privilege offered by the fifth amendment is wonderful for those who wish to take advantage of it, but I'm not standing on it." Tyne refused to identify a Communist Party card, shown to him by the committee counsel, which was made out to "Buddy" Yarus. Tyne said, "All these questions are an invasion of any personal and private ideas and associations."

In July 1956, Tyne was one of seven witnesses, including playwright Arthur Miller, who were cited for contempt of Congress by the House of Representatives. The other six included stage actress Sarah Cunningham, her husband John Randolph, and actors Lou Polan and Stanley Prager.

In March 1957, Tyne, Seger and Sullivan were indicted by a federal grand jury in New York for refusing to answer HUAC questions during its August 1955 hearings. All were charged with contempt of Congress. Tyne was acquitted in 1961 on technical grounds.

== Death ==
Tyne died in Los Angeles, California in 2008. He is interred at Westwood Village Memorial Park Cemetery.

== Selected acting and directing credits ==
=== As film actor ===
- Doughboys in Ireland (1943) - Jimmy Martin
- The Iron Major (1943) - Boston College Player (uncredited)
- The Dancing Masters (1943) - Gangster (uncredited)
- The Racket Man (1944) - Soldier (uncredited)
- Ladies Courageous (1944) - Pilot (uncredited)
- Sailor's Holiday (1944) - Assistant Director (uncredited)
- Four Jills in a Jeep (1944) - Soldier (uncredited)
- Once Upon a Time (1944) - Jitterbug Dancer (uncredited)
- The Eve of St. Mark (1944) - Polinski (uncredited)
- Stars on Parade (1944) - Soldier (uncredited)
- Louisiana Hayride (1944) - Joe - Assistant Director (uncredited)
- Mr. Winkle Goes to War (1944) - Johnson (uncredited)
- Main Street After Dark (1945) - Serviceman in Police Station (uncredited)
- Objective, Burma! (1945) - Pvt. Soapy Higgins (uncredited)
- Brewster's Millions (1945) - Cab Driver (uncredited)
- A Walk in the Sun (1945) - Pvt. Jake Friedman
- Life with Blondie (1945) - Cassidy (uncredited)
- Miss Susie Slagle's (1946) - Davies (uncredited)
- Deadline at Dawn (1946) - Soft Drink Proprietor (uncredited)
- Rolling Home (1946) - Joe
- Seven Were Saved (1947) - Sergeant Blair
- They Won't Believe Me (1947) - Lieutenant Carr
- Body and Soul (1947) - Charlie's Friend (uncredited)
- Open Secret (1948) - Harry Strauss
- Call Northside 777 (1948) - Tomek Zaleska (uncredited)
- The Red Pony (1949) - Charlie (uncredited)
- The Lone Wolf and His Lady (1949) - Paul Braud (uncredited)
- Sword in the Desert (1949) - Dov
- Thieves' Highway (1949) - Charles - Dock Henchman (uncredited)
- Sands of Iwo Jima (1949) - Pfc. Harris
- The Outriders (1950) - Outrider at Dance (uncredited)
- Side Street (1950) - Det. Roffman (uncredited)
- No Way Out (1950) - Whitey (uncredited)
- Decision Before Dawn (1951) - Sgt. Griffin
- Circus World (1964) - Madrid Bartender (uncredited)
- Not with My Wife, You Don't! (1966) - Sgt. Dogerty
- Don't Make Waves (1967) - Newspaperman #1
- The Counterfeit Killer (1968) - George
- The Boston Strangler (1968) - Dr. Kramer
- The Lost Man (1969) - Plainclothesman
- Marlowe (1969) - Oliver Hady
- Tell Them Willie Boy Is Here (1969) - Le Marie
- Skin Game (1971) - Bonner
- Mr. Ricco (1975) - Lt. Barrett
- I Will, I Will... for Now (1976) - Dr. Morrison
- Romantic Comedy (1983) - Doctor #2
- The Lonely Guy (1984) - Director at Party (final film role)

=== As television director ===
- Good Morning World (1967)
- The Good Guys (1969)
- The Odd Couple (1970-1972)
- The Paul Lynde Show (1972-1973)
- Love, American Style (1971-1973)
- Needles and Pins (1973-1974)
- The Bob Newhart Show (1973-1974)
- The San Pedro Beach Bums (1977)
- M*A*S*H (1975-1978)
- The Love Boat' (1978-1980)

== See also ==
- McCarthyism
