= Southwest Passage =

1954 film by Ray Nazarro

- Theatrical release poster
- Directed by: Ray Nazarro
- Written by: Harry Essex
- Produced by: Edward Small
- Starring: Rod Cameron; Joanne Dru; John Ireland
- Cinematography: Sam Leavitt
- Edited by: Grant Whytock
- Music by: Arthur Lange; Emil Newman
- Production company: Edward Small Productions
- Distributed by: United Artists
- Release date: April 1, 1954
- Running time: 75 minutes
- Country: United States
- Language: English

Southwest Passage is a 1954 American Pathécolor Western film directed by Ray Nazarro and starring Joanne Dru, Rod Cameron and John Ireland, who are determined to make a unique trek across the west, using camels as his beasts of burden. The picture was originally released in 3-D.

== Plot summary ==
With $20,000 in stolen gold, Clint McDonald, his girl Lilly and wounded brother Jeb head for the hills, just ahead of a posse. Lilly goes to town to find a doctor for Jeb, then returns with the best she can find, Dr. Stanton, a drunken veterinarian.

Clint becomes aware of a camel-led caravan being led by Edward Fitzpatrick Beale and decides to join it, taking Dr. Stanton's medical kit and pretending to be him. Lilly rides up later, claiming to be separated from a wagon train, but Jeb dies from his injuries.

Mule skinner Matt Caroll is at odds with Clint from the beginning, becoming attracted to Lilly and suspicious of Clint's skill as a doctor. After scout Tall Tale is bitten by a Gila monster and needs a limb amputated, Clint's true identity is revealed and Beale makes him leave. Carroll follows, after the gold, but Clint kills him. Clint repents to Beale by leading the caravan to water and helping fend off attacking Apache braves. He reunites with Lilly and vows to return the gold.

== Cast ==
- Rod Cameron as Edward Fitzgerald Beale
- Joanne Dru as Lilly
- John Ireland as Clint McDonald
- John Dehner as Matt Carroll
- Guinn 'Big Boy' Williams as Tall Tale
- Darryl Hickman as Jeb
- Stuart Randall as Lt. Owens
- Mark Hanna as Hi Jolly
- Douglas Fowley as Toad Ellis
- Morris Ankrum as Doc Stanton

== Production ==
Parts of the film were shot in Johnson Canyon and Coral Pink Sand Dunes in Utah.

== Notes ==
- Navajo Indians from Utah played Apaches in the film. John Ireland and Joanne Dru were husband and wife when this film was made.
- This used to be one of only two feature films for which the original 3-D elements are lost, the other being Top Banana (1954). However, 3-D Film Archive founder Bob Furmanek has confirmed that the four missing reels from the right side were located in a UK film lab in 2018 by Darren Gross of MGM. The UK lab had acquired the inventory of a bankrupt Italian lab, and the reels in question had been labeled as "Camels West", which Darren knew to be the film's UK title. The film is now slated to be restored by the 3-D Film Archive and released on Blu-ray 3D in 2024 by Kino Lorber.
- The film was originally known as Camel Corps.

== See also ==
- List of incomplete or partially lost films
