= The Falcon Strikes Back =

1943 film

- Film poster
- Directed by: Edward Dmytryk
- Written by: Stuart Palmer
- Screenplay by: Edward Dein; Gerald Geraghty
- Based on: Characters created by Michael Arlen
- Produced by: Maurice Geraghty
- Starring: Tom Conway; Harriet Hilliard; Jane Randolph; Edgar Kennedy; Cliff Edwards
- Cinematography: Jack MacKenzie
- Edited by: George Crone
- Music by: Roy Webb
- Production company: RKO Radio Pictures Inc.
- Distributed by: RKO Pictures
- Release dates: April 1, 1943 (Premiere-New York City); May 7, 1943 (U.S.)
- Running time: 66 minutes
- Country: United States
- Language: English

The Falcon Strikes Back (a.k.a. The Falcon Comes Back) is a 1943 American crime film directed by Edward Dmytryk and stars Tom Conway as the title character, amateur sleuth the Falcon. Supporting roles are filled by Harriet Hilliard, Jane Randolph, Edgar Kennedy, with Cliff Edwards filling in for Allen Jenkins as the Falcon's sidekick Jonathan "Goldie" Locke. It is the fifth film in The Falcon series and the second for Conway, reprising the role that his brother George Sanders had initiated.

== Plot ==
Amateur sleuth Tom Lawrence, known as the Falcon, is approached by Mia Bruger to help in finding her brother Franzel, who had gone missing. When Tom goes to a cocktail bar, he is attacked and knocked unconscious. When he revives, he finds himself in his car on a country road. A motorcycle police officer stops him and arrests him because Inspector Timothy Donovan has put out an "all-points" bulletin for his arrest in the case of a murdered bank official and the theft of $250,000 in war bonds.

Although the Falcon has an alibi with his fiancée, reporter Marcia Brooks and assistant, Jonathan "Goldie" Locke supporting him, Donovan is skeptical and attempts to incarcerate Tom, who makes his escape. Returning to the bar, it is now the headquarters of a woman's knitting society, run by Geraldine Lipton. When the trio of sleuths head off to Lipton's resort hotel, they find a number of suspicious individuals, including hotel manager Gwynne Gregory, former criminal Rickey Davis, Albert Jones, a nurse to invalid Bruno Steffen and Mia.

When Tom approaches Mia, she pretends that she doesn't know him and dives into the pool but as she hits the water, she is killed by a gunshot. Looking for the killer, Tom runs into puppeteer Smiley Dugan, who alerts Donovan that the Falcon is at the hotel. Picking up a cigarette case that might be a clue to the murderer, Tom has to work quickly before Donovan arrives.

Marcia reports that the fingerprints on the cigarette case belong to a notorious thief known as the Duchess. Tom phones his houseboy Jerry, telling him to pose as the Chinese Trade Commissioner wanting to buy war bonds. After Steffen confides to Jerry that he plans to buy war bonds from Gwynne, Tom exposes Mrs. Lipton as the Duchess and accuses her of stealing the bonds but Donovan, with a warrant for murder, arrests Tom, Marcia, Goldie and Jerry instead.

Finding a way to escape once again, Tom returns to the hotel and confronts Mrs. Lipton, who was being blackmailed by Rickey into selling the war bonds. When Rickey is killed, a terrified Gwynne confesses that she was involved because Rickey was her husband. When he is trapped in an elevator with Gwynne, Tom realizes that the killer is still in the hotel. Finding a way out, Tom rushes to Mrs. Lipton's room to find Dugan threatening her. When Tom tries to apprehend him, Dugan falls to his death. Donovan, now convinced in Tom's innocence, arrives to arrest Mrs. Lipton for the theft of the war bonds.

== Cast ==
- Tom Conway as Tom Lawrence/The Falcon
- Harriet Hilliard as Gwynne Gregory
- Jane Randolph as Marcia Brooks
- Edgar Kennedy as Smiley Dugan
- Cliff Edwards as Jonathan "Goldie" Locke
- Rita Corday as Mia Bruger
- Erford Gage as Rickey Davis
- Wynne Gibson as Geraldine H. Lipton
- André Charlot as Bruno Steffen
- Richard Loo as Jerry
- Cliff Clark as Inspector Timothy Donovan
- Edward Gargan as Detective Bates
- Byron Foulger as Clerk
- Patti Brill as Bellhop
- Margaret Landry as Bellhop
- Margie Stewart as Bellhop
- Jean Brooks as Spanish Girl
- Olin Howland as Sheriff
- Perc Launders as Bartender
- Eddie Dunn as Grimes
- Charles Russell as Bank Messenger
- Frank O'Connor as Guard
- Ralph Dunn as Motorcycle Policeman
- Frank Faylen as Hobo
- Jack Norton as Hobo
- George Lloyd as Brannigan
- Mary Stuart as Usherette
- Lorna Dunn as Taxi Driver

== Production ==
With the working title of The Falcon Comes Back, principal photography took place from January 19 until early February 1943.

== Reception ==
In his review of The Falcon Strikes Back, Theodore Strauss wrote, in The New York Times, "There is something highly irregular about The Falcon Strikes Back, now at the Palace, and we don't mean murder. Item: The role of the Falcon is no longer played by George Sanders, but by his brother, Tom Conway, who looks like Sanders, sounds like Sanders, but is less of an actor—the result is a sort of double exposure, slightly out of focus. Item: Edgar Kennedy after all these years of two-reel comedy madness, turns out to be a dangerous maniac after all, which is like discovering that Donald Duck really belongs in the ward for violent cases. Aside from these two troublesome matters, The Falcon Strikes Back is hardly worth bothering about. The Falcon rounds up a gang of bond thieves amid the standard quota of murder and mayhem, but the lack of suspense is terrific."
