= John Ireland =

Canadian-American actor (1914–1992)

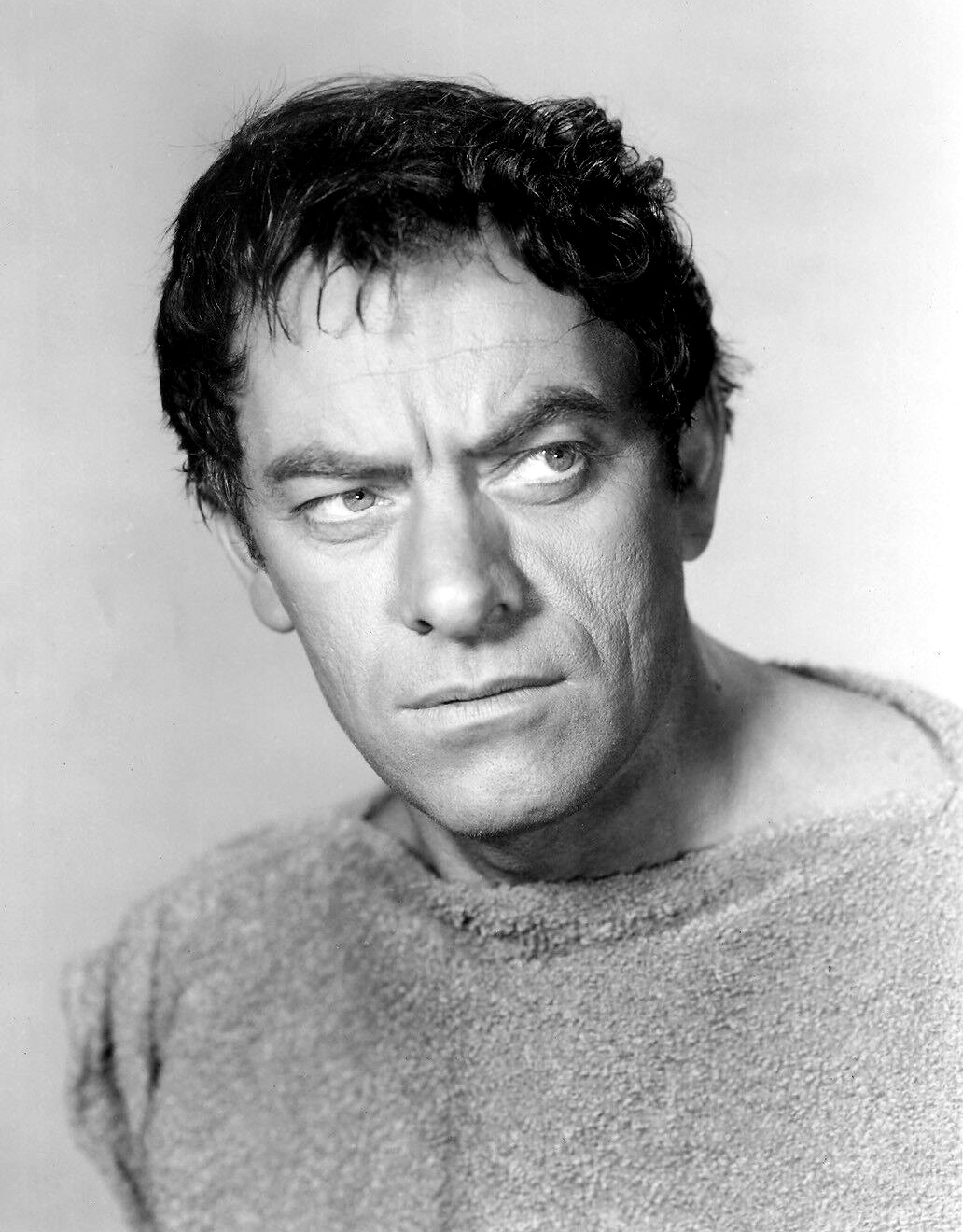
- Ireland in 1960
- Born: John Benjamin Ireland; January 30, 1914; Vancouver, British Columbia, Canada
- Died: March 21, 1992 (aged 78); Santa Barbara, California, U.S.
- Resting place: Santa Barbara Cemetery, Santa Barbara, California, U.S.
- Occupations: Actor; film director
- Years active: 1932–1992
- Spouses: Elaine Sheldon Rosen (m. 1940; div. 1948) Joanne Dru (m. 1949; div. 1957) Daphne Myrick Cameron (m. 1962; died 1992)
- Children: 4
- Relatives: Tommy Noonan (half-brother)

John Benjamin Ireland (January 30, 1914 – March 21, 1992) was a Canadian-born American actor and film director. Born in Vancouver, British Columbia and raised in New York City, he came to prominence with film audiences for his supporting roles in several high-profile Western films, including My Darling Clementine (1946), Red River (1948), Vengeance Valley (1951), and Gunfight at the O.K. Corral (1957). He was nominated for an Academy Award for his role as Jack Burden in All the King's Men (1949), making him the first British Columbia-born actor to receive an Oscar nomination.

Ireland's other film roles include A Walk in the Sun (1945), Joan Of Arc (1948), Spartacus (1960), 55 Days at Peking (1963), The Fall of the Roman Empire (1964), The Adventurers (1970), and Farewell, My Lovely (1975). He also appeared in many television series, notably The Cheaters (1960–62). In the late 1960s and 1970s, he worked in Italian cinema, including the Spaghetti Westerns Run, Man, Run (1968), the giallo One on Top of the Other (1969), and the controversial war drama Salon Kitty (1976).

In 1960, Ireland was presented with a star on the Hollywood Walk of Fame for his contribution to the television industry.

== Early life ==
Ireland was born in Vancouver, British Columbia, on January 30, 1914. He lived in New York City from a very early age, where he was raised in poverty in Harlem. Ireland's formal education ended at the 7th grade, and he worked to help his family make ends meet.

He never knew his natural father; his mother, a Scottish piano teacher Gracie Ferguson, remarried to Michael Noone, an Irish vaudevillian, and had three other children, a daughter Kathryn, a son named Thomas (the future actor-comedian Tommy Noonan), and another son, Michael. Their last name was Noone; Ireland never knew for sure where his last name came from.

He was a swimmer, once competing with Johnny Weissmuller. He performed underwater stunts at a carnival and worked as a barker. One of his jobs was in a water carnival where he wrestled a dead octopus.

== Career ==
=== Theatre ===
One day he was passing the Davenport Free Theater in Manhattan. He entered, thinking it offered a free show and instead received free training. He slept in a dressing room and was paid a dollar a day to work backstage while rehearsing lines.

In 1941 he made his Broadway debut in a production of Macbeth with Maurice Evans and Judith Anderson. Other Broadway plays followed.

=== 20th Century Fox ===
Ireland signed with 20th Century Fox and made his screen-debut as Private Windy, the thoughtful letter-writing GI, in the 1945 war film A Walk in the Sun, directed by Lewis Milestone.

This was followed by Wake Up and Dream (1946); Behind Green Lights (1946) with Carole Landis; and It Shouldn't Happen to a Dog (1946), again with Landis. He played Billy Clanton in John Ford's My Darling Clementine (1946).

=== Freelance actor and Red River ===
Ireland had his first lead role in Railroaded! (1947), directed by Anthony Mann for Eagle-Lion. He went back to support parts for The Gangster (1947) for the King Brothers and I Love Trouble (1948) for Columbia.

Ireland played the lead in Open Secret (1948) for Eagle-Lion, then had a support role in Anthony Mann's classic noir, Raw Deal (1948).

Ireland had a vital support part in Howard Hawks' 1948 film Red River as the gunslinger Cherry Valance. However, Ireland's part was reduced when Hawks became annoyed with the actor. One theory claims Hawks was jealous of Ireland's romance with leading lady (and future wife) Joanne Dru. However, Hawks claimed it was due to Ireland's consumption of alcohol and marijuana. Ireland was an army captain in the Ingrid Bergman spectacular, Joan of Arc (1948).

=== All the King's Men ===
In April 1948 Ireland signed a contract with Columbia Pictures at $500 a week going up to $1500 a week. Ireland was nominated for an Oscar as Best Supporting Actor for his powerful performance as Jack Burden, the hard-boiled newspaper reporter who evolves from devotee to cynical denouncer of demagogue Willie Stark (Broderick Crawford) in All the King's Men (1949), making him the first Vancouver-born actor to receive an Academy Award nomination.

Ireland played cynical muckraking reporter Henry "Early" Byrd in the quirky Glenn Ford/Evelyn Keyes vehicle "Christmas movie" (though released in August 1949) Mr. Soft Touch.

Ireland was featured as Bob Ford in the low budget I Shot Jesse James (1949) the first movie directed by Sam Fuller. He was a villain in the Western Roughshod (1949) and a love rival for Paulette Goddard in Anna Lucasta (1949).

In December 1949 Columbia suspended him after walking out after filming one scene on One Way Out (released as Convicted). He sued the studio. He and Columbia parted ways in February 1950 after Ireland agreed to pay the studio 25% of his earnings for the next five years.

Lippert Pictures gave Ireland the lead in The Return of Jesse James (1950) and he appeared opposite his then-wife Joanne Dru in support parts in Vengeance Valley (1951)

During McCarthyism in the early 50s, he successfully sued two television producers for breach of contract and slander, claiming that they reneged on roles promised to him due to his perceived political undesirability, including the lead in a TV series The Adventures of Ellery McQueen. He received an undisclosed but "substantial" cash settlement.

Ireland had the leads in some low-budget films: The Basketball Fix (1951); The Scarf (1951); Little Big Horn (1951); The Bushwackers (1952); and Hannah Lee (1953) with his wife. He co-directed the latter. That film resulted in a lawsuit against the producers.

He went to England to make The Good Die Young (1954) and supported his wife in Southwest Passage (1954) and Joan Crawford in Queen Bee (1955).

He had the lead in the British thriller The Glass Cage (1955) and the war film Hell's Horizon (1955). He made another for Corman, this time only as an actor – Gunslinger (1956).

In July 1955 he signed a contract with Revue to act and direct films for television.

In January 1956 he signed to play the lead in the TV series Port of Call.

Ireland landed a supporting role as Johnny Ringo in Gunfight at the O.K. Corral (1957), and played a mobster in MGM's Party Girl (1958). He had the lead in No Place to Land (1958), and Stormy Crossing (1958).

In 1959, Ireland appeared as Chris Slade, with Karl Swenson as Ansel Torgin, in the episode "The Fight Back" of the NBC Western series, Riverboat. In the storyline, Tom Fowler (Tom Laughlin), the boss of the corrupt river town of Hampton near Vicksburg, Mississippi, blocks farmers from shipping their crops to market. In a dispute over a wedding held on the Enterprise, a lynch-mob led by Fowler comes after series lead-character Grey Holden (Darren McGavin). Karl Swenson also was cast in this episode.

=== Director ===
John Ireland turned director with the Western Hannah Lee, co-directing with Lee Garmes while also appearing in it. He then co-directed (with Edward Sampson) The Fast and the Furious (1954), an early production from Roger Corman. Starring Ireland, the film's title would later be licensed for the 2001 film of the same name but with a completely unrelated story and characters.

=== 1960s ===
In 1959, John made a guest appearance on Judy Garland's album The Letter for Capitol Records.

Ireland had a key role as the gladiator Crixus in the Stanley Kubrick 1960 spectacle Spartacus, co-starring with Kirk Douglas. That year he starred as Winch in the Western series Rawhide episode "Incident of the Garden of Eden" and made Faces in the Dark (1960) in England. He also appeared in the Thriller TV series (1960) episode "Papa Benjamin."

From 1960 to 1962, he starred in the British television series The Cheaters, playing John Hunter, a claims investigator for an insurance company who tracked down cases of fraud. He supported Elvis Presley in Wild in the Country (1961) and had the lead in the British Return of a Stranger (1961).

In 1962, he portrayed the character Frank Trask in the episode "Incident of the Portrait" on Rawhide. Rawhide, S7, EP28 Air date: May 7, 1965, THE SPANISH CAMP" A group of men led by Dr. John Merritt (John Ireland) searching for old Spanish treasure stubbornly refuses to let the cattle drive come through the area of their diggings, even though the herd desperately needs the water in the area.

He had a supporting part in 55 Days at Peking (1963) with Charlton Heston and was Ballomar in The Fall of the Roman Empire (1964), both films shot in Spain by producer Samuel Bronston.

By the mid-1960s, he was seen as the star of B-movies, such as I Saw What You Did with Crawford. In 1965, he played the role of Jed Colby, a trail scout, in the final season of Rawhide. In 1966 he starred in the episode "Stage Stop" (S12E10) as abusive husband and stage coach robbery collaborator "Jeb Coombs" on Gunsmoke.

In 1967, he appeared as Marshal Will Rimbau on Bonanza with Michael Landon in the episode "Judgment at Red Creek". A few years later, he again appeared with Landon on two episodes of Little House on the Prairie as a drunk who saves Carrie Ingalls, who had fallen down an abandoned mine shaft in the season 3 episode "Little Girl Lost" and the season 5 episode "The Winoka Warriors".

He had some leads in the A. C. Lyles Western Fort Utah (1967), then traveled to Europe to appear in Hate for Hate (1967), and Pistol for a Hundred Coffins (1967) and supported in Villa Rides (1968), Trusting Is Good... Shooting Is Better (1969), One on Top of the Other (1969), and Carnal Circuit (1969).

=== 1970s ===
In 1970, Ireland appeared as Kinroy in the television Western The Men From Shiloh episode titled "Jenny". Ireland was seen in productions like The House of Seven Corpses (1974), Salon Kitty (1976) and Satan's Cheerleaders (1977). He did, however, also appear in big-budget fare such as The Adventurers (1970), also as a police lieutenant in the Robert Mitchum private-eye story Farewell, My Lovely (1975).

=== Later career ===
He starred in Thunder Run (1986), an American action-thriller film directed by Gary Hudson and co-starring Forrest Tucker.

In 1987, he put an ad in the newspapers stating "I'm an actor... let me act." It led to a role as Jonathan Aaron Cartwright, the younger brother of Ben Cartwright, in the television movie Bonanza: The Next Generation.

He was seen in the War of the Worlds episode "Eye for an Eye" in 1988.

Ireland regularly returned to the stage throughout his career.

== Restaurant ==
In his later years, he owned the restaurant Ireland's in Santa Barbara, California. An accomplished chef, he regularly worked in the kitchen and concocted Ireland Stew, combining whatever ingredients were available on a given night. He was also a regular at the restaurant's bar, greeting patrons and buying drinks for friends.

The restaurant failed. In May 1977, Ireland declared bankruptcy.

== Personal life ==
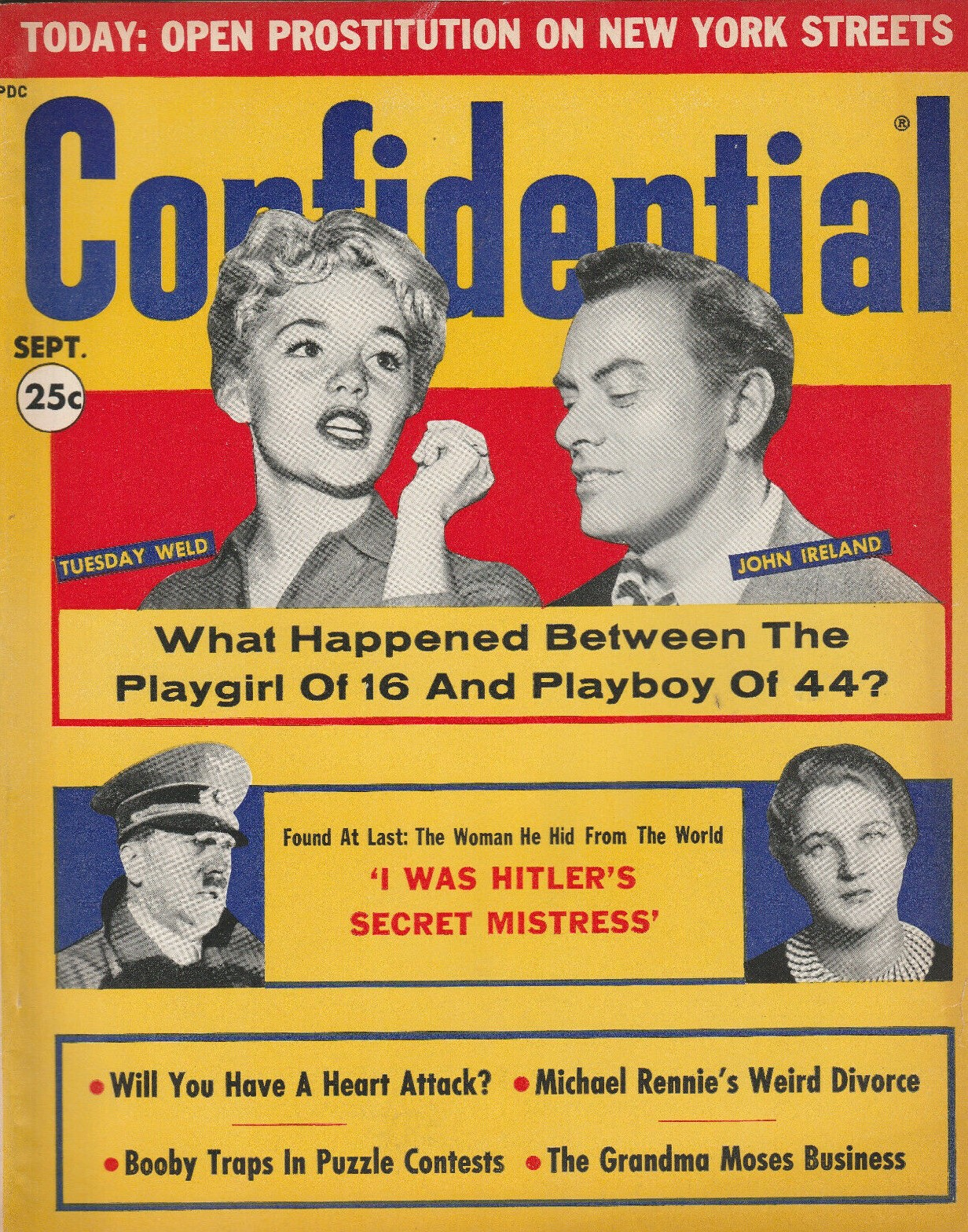
1960 gossip magazine with a story about Ireland and Tuesday Weld

Occasionally Ireland's name was mentioned in tabloids of the times, in connection with much younger starlets, including Natalie Wood, Barbara Payton, and Sue Lyon. He attracted controversy by dating 16-year-old actress Tuesday Weld when he was 45. Ireland also had an affair with co-star Joan Crawford while on the set of Queen Bee (1955). A decade later, Ireland and Crawford co-starred again in William Castle's movie I Saw What You Did.

He was married three times. His first wife, from 1940 to 1949, was Elaine Sheldon, with whom he had two sons, John and Peter.

From 1949 to 1957, he was married to actress Joanne Dru (whose younger brother, entertainer Peter Marshall, was originally best known for his comedy act with Ireland's half-brother Tommy Noonan). In July 1956, Dru was admitted to hospital with a black eye which she said was accidental but which was commonly believed to have been caused by Ireland. Ireland later was admitted to hospital for taking an overdose of barbiturates.

When the couple divorced in 1957 they had over $50,000 in debts.

From 1962 until his death, Ireland was married to Daphne Myrick Cameron, with whom he had a daughter named Daphne and a son named Cameron. He has four grandchildren: Pete, Melissa, Jack and Helios.

=== Death ===
On March 21, 1992, Ireland died in Santa Barbara, California of leukemia at the age of 78. He is buried at the Santa Barbara Cemetery.

== Honors ==
For his contribution to the television industry, he was commemorated with a star on the Hollywood Walk of Fame at 1610 Vine Street.

== Filmography ==
Year	Title	Role	Notes
1945	A Walk in the Sun	Private First Class Windy Craven	
1946	Behind Green Lights	Detective Oppenheimer	
1946	Somewhere in the Night	Minor Role	Voice, Uncredited
1946	It Shouldn't Happen to a Dog	Benny Smith	
1946	My Darling Clementine	Billy Clanton	
1946	Wake Up and Dream	Howard Williams	
1947	Repeat Performance	Narrator	Voice, Uncredited
1947	Railroaded!	Duke Martin	
1947	The Gangster	Frank Karty	
1948	I Love Trouble	Reno	
1948	Open Secret	Paul Lester	
1948	Raw Deal	Fantail	
1948	A Southern Yankee	Captain Jed Calbern	
1948	Red River	Cherry Valance	
1948	Joan of Arc	Jean de la Boussac, St. Severe	
1949	I Shot Jesse James	Bob Ford	
1949	The Walking Hills	Frazee	
1949	The Undercover Man	Narrator	Voice, Uncredited
1949	Roughshod	Lednov	
1949	The Doolins of Oklahoma	Bitter Creek	
1949	Anna Lucasta	Danny Johnson	
1949	Mr. Soft Touch	Henry "Early" Byrd	
1949	All the King's Men	Jack Burden	Academy Award nomination for Ireland, the film won the Oscar for Best Picture
1950	Cargo to Capetown	Steve Conway	
1950	The Return of Jesse James	Johnny Callum	
1951	Vengeance Valley	Hub Fasken	
1951	The Scarf	John Howard Barrington	
1951	Little Big Horn	Lieutenant John Haywood	
1951	The Basketball Fix	Pete Ferreday	
1951	Red Mountain	General William Quantrill	
1951	The Bushwackers	Jefferson Waring	
1952	Hurricane Smith	Hurricane Smith	
1953	The 49th Man	Investigator John Williams	
1953	Hannah Lee	Marshal Sam Rochelle	Also co-director. Released in color and 3-D, re-released "flat" in B&W; a.k.a. Outlaw Territory
1953	Combat Squad	Sergeant Ken 'Fletch' Fletcher	
1954	The Good Die Young	Eddie Blaine	
1954	Southwest Passage	Clint McDonald	
1954	Security Risk	Ralph Payne	
1954	The Steel Cage	Al, a Ringleader	(segment "The Hostages")
1955	The Glass Cage	Pel Pelham	
1955	The Fast and the Furious	Frank Webster	Also co-director.
1955	Queen Bee	Judd Prentiss	
1955	Hell's Horizon	Captain John Merrill	
1956	Gunslinger	Cane Miro	
1957	Gunfight at the O.K. Corral	Johnny Ringo	
1958	Stormy Crossing	Griff Parker	
1958	No Place to Land	Jonas Bailey	
1958	Party Girl	Louis Canetto	
1959	Med mord i bagaget	Johnny Greco	
1960	Spartacus	Crixus	
1960	Faces in the Dark	Max Hammond	
1961	Wild in the Country	Phil Macy	
1961	Return of a Stranger	Ray Reed	
1962	Brushfire	Jeff Saygure	
1963	55 Days at Peking	Sergeant Harry	
1963	The Ceremony	Prison Warden	
1964	The Fall of the Roman Empire	Ballomar	
1965	I Saw What You Did	Steve Marek	
1965	Day of the Nightmare	Detective Sergeant Dave Harmon	
1967	Hate for Hate	James Arthur Cooper	
1967	Fort Utah	Tom Horn	
1967	Dirty Heroes	Captain O'Connor	
1967	Caxambu	Vince Neff	
1968	Go for Broke	The Owl	
1968	Arizona Bushwhackers	Deputy Dan Shelby	
1968	Villa Rides	Client in barber shop	Uncredited
1968	Trusting Is Good... Shooting Is Better	The Colonel	
1968	Pistol for a Hundred Coffins	Douglas	
1968	Run, Man, Run	Santillana	
1968	A Taste of Death	Dan El	
1968	Revenge for Revenge	Major Bower	
1968	Gatling Gun	Tarpas	
1969	El 'Che' Guevara	Stuart	
1969	Carnal Circuit	Richard Salinger	
1969	One on Top of the Other	Inspector Wald	
1969	Zenabel	Don Alonso Imolne	
1969	I diavoli della guerra	American General	Uncredited
1970	Men From Shiloh (rebranded name of The Virginian)	Kinroy	
1970	La sfida dei MacKenna	Jones	
1970	The Adventurers	Mr. James Hadley	
1972	Escape to the Sun	Jacob Kagan	
1972	Northeast of Seoul	Flanagan	
1973	Huyendo del halcón		Shot in 1966
1974	The House of Seven Corpses	Eric Hartman	
1974	Welcome to Arrow Beach	Sheriff Duke Bingham	
1974	Dieci bianchi uccisi da un piccolo indiano	Abel Webster	
1975	Farewell, My Lovely	Detective Lieutenant Nulty	
1975	We Are No Angels	Mr. Shark	
1976	Salon Kitty	Cliff	
1976	Sex Diary	Milton	
1976	The Swiss Conspiracy	Dwight McGowan	
1977	Assault in Paradise	Chief Haliburton	a.k.a. The Ransom and Maniac!
1977	Mission to Glory: A True Story	Benny	
1977	Satan's Cheerleaders	The Sheriff	
1977	Love and the Midnight Auto Supply	Tony Santore	
1977	The Perfect Killer	Benny	
1977	The Moon and a Mumur		
1978	Tomorrow Never Comes	Captain	
1979	H. G. Wells' The Shape of Things to Come	Senator Smedley	
1979	Guyana: Cult of the Damned	Dave Cole	
1979	Delta Fox	Lucas Johnson	
1979	On the Air Live with Captain Midnight	Agent Pierson	
1981	Bordello	Judge	
1982	The Incubus	Hank Walden	
1985	Martin's Day	Brewer	
1985	The Treasure of the Amazon	Priest	
1985	Miami Golem	Anderson	
1986	Thunder Run	George Adams	
1987	Terror Night	Lance Hayward	
1988	Messenger of Death	Zenas Beecham	
1989	Sundown: The Vampire in Retreat	Ethan Jefferson	
1990	The Graveyard Story	Dr. McGregor	
1992	Waxwork II: Lost in Time	King Arthur	
1992	Hammer Down	Lieutenant Bates	(final film role)

== Television ==
Year	Title	Role	Notes
1962	Alfred Hitchcock Presents	Captain Randolph McCabe	Episode: "The Matched Pearl"
1974	The Phantom of Hollywood	Lieutenant Gifford	TV movie
1976, 1978	Little House On The Prairie	Wendell Loudy, Frank Carlin	Episodes: "Little Girl Lost", “Winoka Warriors”
1979	Crossbar	Miles Kornylo	
1985	The Fall Guy	Nick Spiros	Episode: "Skip Family Robinson"
1988	Bonanza: The Next Generation	Captain Aaron Cartwright	
