= Call Northside 777 =

1948 film by Henry Hathaway

- Theatrical release poster
- Directed by: Henry Hathaway
- Screenplay by: Jerome Cady; Jay Dratler; Leonard Hoffman (adaptation); Quentin Reynolds (adaptation)
- Based on: 1944 Chicago Daily Times articles by James P. McGuire; Jack McPhaul – writer (uncredited)
- Produced by: Otto Lang
- Starring: James Stewart; Richard Conte; Lee J. Cobb; Helen Walker; Betty Garde; Kasia Orzazewski; Joanne De Bergh; Howard Smith; Moroni Olsen; John McIntire; Paul Harvey
- Narrated by: Truman Bradley
- Cinematography: Joseph MacDonald
- Edited by: J. Watson Webb Jr.
- Music by: Alfred Newman
- Distributed by: 20th Century-Fox
- Release date: February 1948
- Running time: 111 minutes
- Country: United States
- Language: English
- Box office: $2.7 million (US rentals)

Call Northside 777 is a 1948 American docudrama film directed by Henry Hathaway. The film parallels the true story of a Chicago newspaper reporter who proved that a man jailed for murder 11 years previously was wrongly convicted. James Stewart stars as the persistent journalist and Richard Conte plays the imprisoned Frank Wiecek. Wiecek is based on Joseph Majczek, who was wrongly convicted of the murder of a Chicago policeman in 1932, one of the worst years of organized crime during Prohibition.

== Plot ==
In Chicago in 1932, during Prohibition, policeman John W. Bundy is murdered inside a speakeasy. Frank Wiecek and another man are quickly arrested, and, in November 1933, are each convicted and sentenced to serve 99 years imprisonment for the killing.

Eleven years later, Wiecek's mother puts a classified ad in the Chicago Times offering a $5,000 reward for information about the true killers of the police officer. City editor Brian Kelly assigns reporter P. J. McNeal to look more closely into the case. McNeal is skeptical at first, believing Wiecek to be guilty. But he starts to change his mind, and meets increased resistance from the police and the state's attorney's office, who are unwilling to be proven wrong. This is quickly followed by pressure from politicos at the state capital anxious to end a story that might prove embarrassing to the current administration.

P.J. writes an article Where is Wanda Skutnik. P.J. soon discovers in a bar where Wanda is. She is now a married woman. P.J. goes to her home and confronts Wanda but she denies that she lied in court. She actually is defensive.

Wiecek is finally confirmed innocent by the enlarging of a photograph showing the date on a newspaper that proves that a key witness lied.

== Cast ==
- James Stewart as P.J. McNeal (based on real-life reporter James McGuire)
- Richard Conte as Frank Wiecek (based on real-life convict Joseph Majczek)
- Lee J. Cobb as Brian Kelly (based on real-life editor Karin Walsh)
- Helen Walker as Laura McNeal
- Betty Garde as Wanda Skutnik (based on real-life witness Vera Walush)
- Kasia Orzazewski as Tillie Wiecek (based on real-life mother Tillie Majczek)
- Joanne De Bergh as Helen Wiecek
- Michael Chapin as Frank Wiecek Jr.
- Howard Smith as K.L. Palmer (based on real-life manager K.L. Endecott)
- Moroni Olsen as Pardon Board Chairman
- J.M. Kerrigan as Sullivan
- John McIntire as Sam Faxon
- Paul Harvey as Martin J. Burns (based on real-life lawyer Martin J. Scott)
- George Tyne as Tomek Zaleska (based on real-life convict Theodore Marcinkiewicz) (uncredited)
- Leonarde Keeler, coinventor of the polygraph, as himself (uncredited)
- E. G. Marshall as Rayska (uncredited)
- Thelma Ritter as receptionist (uncredited)
- Lionel Stander as Corrigan, Wiecek's cellmate (uncredited)
- Truman Bradley as the narrator (uncredited)
- Samuel S. Hinds as Judge Charles Moulton (uncredited)
- Charles Lane as Prosecuting Attorney (uncredited)
- Eddie Dunn as Patrolman John W.Bundy (uncredited)

== Production ==
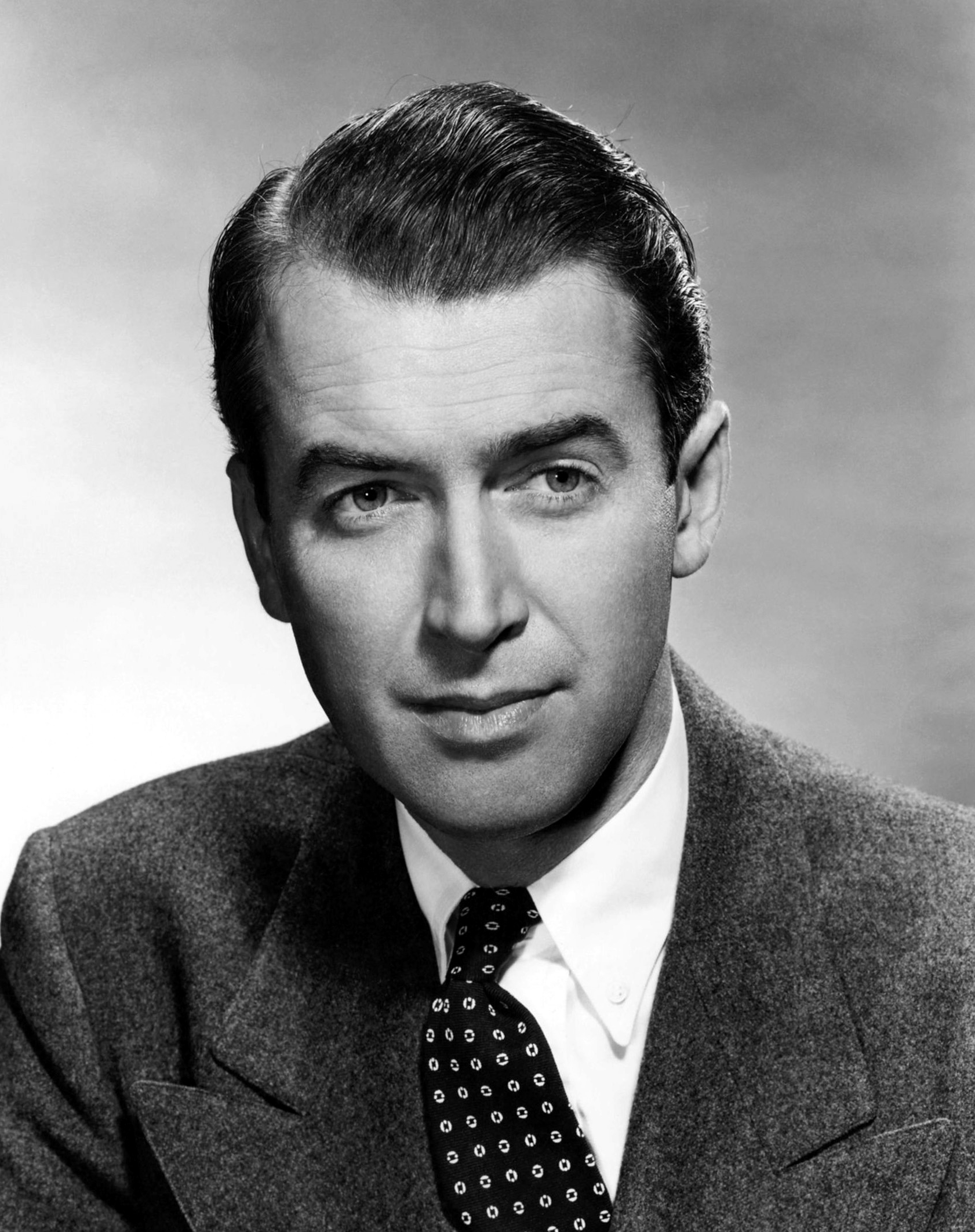
James Stewart in Call Northside 777 (1948)

20th Century-Fox reported on January 24, 1947, that Call Northside 777 would be filmed in the semi-documentary manner. Fox had obtained the necessary legal clearances from the persons involved in the story and had dispatched producer Otto Lang and writer Leonard Hoffman to gather material for the film in Chicago. Eventually Quentin Reynolds and Jay Dratler joined Hoffman in writing the script.

According to a March 7 report in The New York Times, Fox had named Henry Fonda to play the lead in Call Northside 777, which would precede Chicken Every Sunday and Lone Star Preacher on Fonda's schedule. However, a month later Fonda was cast as the star of Daisy Kenyon. Two months afterward Fox replaced Fonda in Call Northside 777 with Jimmy Stewart. Lloyd Nolan was originally tabbed to play the role of Brian Kelly, but Lee J. Cobb ended up in the role. Leopoldine Konstantin was originally considered to play the wrongly convicted man's mother, but the part went to Kasia Orzazewski.

Call Northside 777 was shot extensively in Chicago. Views of the Merchandise Mart as well as Holy Trinity Polish Mission can be seen throughout the film.

Aside from Chicago, locations for Call Northside 777 included Santa Monica and also the Illinois Stateville Prison "Roundhouse" annex, which was closed in 2016 but briefly reopened in 2020 for COVID-19 housing. (The prison "Roundhouse" was a panopticon cellblock, built according to ideas originated by English philosopher Jeremy Bentham).

Screenwriters on Call Northside 777 took liberties in a number of areas to make what they believed would be a more compelling story for a theater audience. Among them was that while Wiecek's innocence is determined by enlarging a newspaper headline to catch a key witness lying about a minor point, the real life Majczek's innocence was established by locating the original arrest report that corroborated Majczek's assertion that the speakeasy proprietress had failed to identify him in 2 lineups conducted the day he was arrested, and only picked him out in a third lineup conducted the following day.

== Release ==
The film opened at the New Theatre in Baltimore in the week ending 18 February 1948 and opened at the Roxy theatre in New York City on 18 February.

== Reception ==
=== Critical response ===
The film received mostly positive reviews when it was first released, and again when it was released on DVD in 2004.

James Creelman of The New York Sun wrote: "Calls for three cheers from every working newspaper man and, for that matter, for at least two from every moviegoer."

Cecelia Ager of PM praised the film as "By far the best documentary-style movie yet... Hands down the most expert, informative, gripping, and develops the most substantial audience rooting interest of them all."

Critic James Agee writing in The Nation in 1948 characterized it as "A rather dogged but otherwise competent fact-fiction movie; good camera work on Chicago slums: intelligent use of natural sound. Next to Boomerang! the best, so far, of its kind."

Leslie Halliwell gave it two of four stars: "Overlong semi-documentary crime thriller based on a real case. Acting and detail excellent, but the sharp edge of Boomerang! is missing."

On the review aggregator website Rotten Tomatoes, 81% of 21 critics' reviews are positive. In 2005, the Onion AV Club Review argued that the film may not be a true film noir, but is good nonetheless: "Outstanding location shooting and Stewart's driven performance turn a sober film into a vibrant, exciting one, even though the hero and the jailbird he champions are really too noble for noir."

The website DVD Verdict made the case in 2006 that the lead actor may be the best reason to see the film: "Its value exists mainly in Stewart's finely drawn characterization of a cynical man with a nagging conscience."

=== Box office ===
Call Northside 777 reached number one at the US box office in its third week of release with a gross of $500,000 from 17 cities.

=== Awards ===
Wins

- Edgar Award: from the Mystery Writers of America for Best Motion Picture Screenplay; 1949.

Nominations

- Writers Guild of America: WGA Award; Best Written American Drama, Jerome Cady and Jay Dratler; The Robert Meltzer Award (Screenplay Dealing Most Ably with Problems of the American Scene), Jerome Cady and Jay Dratler; 1949.

== Recognition ==
The film was nominated by American Film Institute for its list:

- 2001: AFI's 100 Years...100 Thrills

== Adaptations ==
Stewart reprised the lead role for a Screen Directors Playhouse radio program that aired on December 9, 1949.

For an episode of CBS Radio's Hollywood Sound Stage, broadcast December 27, 1951, Harry Kronman adapted and directed a condensed 30-minute version of the film, casting Dana Andrews and Thomas Gomez in the leads. Tony Barrett, Bob Sweeney, Betty Lou Gerson, and Frank Nelson played supporting roles.

The April 17, 1951, audition episode of the radio program Defense Attorney (then titled Defense Rests) starring Mercedes McCambridge was based on the same plot, with some modifications.

Indian Hindi film Post Box 999 (1958) directed by Ravindra Dave was inspired by this film.
