= Majczek and Marcinkiewicz =

Polish-American men, framed for killing a Chicago police officer in 1932

Joseph Majczek and Theodore Marcinkiewicz were two Polish-American men arrested and convicted of the murder of 57-year-old Chicago police officer William D. Lundy on December 9, 1932. Initially, officials held 10 youths in custody on suspicion of killing the officer. Some 11½ years later in 1944, following the intervention of Chicago Times reporters John McPhaul and James McGuire, both men were exonerated of the crime. The real killers have never been identified.

The details of the case formed the basis of the 1948 film Call Northside 777 starring James Stewart, Lee J. Cobb, and Richard Conte.

== Background ==
On October 10, 1944, a classified advertisement appeared in the Chicago Times: "$5,000 REWARD FOR KILLERS OF OFFICER LUNDY ON DEC. 9, 1932. CALL GRO 1758, 12-7 P.M." The ad was brought to the attention of the city editor Karin Walsh, who assigned seasoned police reporter James McGuire to dig into the story further. McGuire researched the case and learned that Officer Lundy had been murdered on December 9, 1932, and that Joseph Majczek, 24, and Theodore Marcinkiewicz, 25, were convicted in 1933 at the Cook County Superior Court.

The convictions (which the Illinois Supreme Court had affirmed as People v. Majczek, 360 Ill. 261 (1935)) were based largely on the testimony of eyewitness Vera Walush. She was recorded as the proprietor of a "delicatessen" (a euphemism for a speakeasy) where the crime occurred. Though both defendants presented strong alibis based on several witnesses saying they were elsewhere when the crime took place, both were convicted.

Upon calling the number from the ad, McGuire reached Majczek's mother, Tillie. McGuire realized there was potential for a human interest story developing when he learned that the $5,000 on offer had been earned by the mother scrubbing floors at the Commonwealth Edison Company.

== Criminal case ==
McGuire first suspected there may have been a wrongful conviction when he learned that Majczek and Marcinkiewicz had not gone to the electric chair for the officer's murder but were sentenced to 99 years each at Joliet. This might have indicated that the trial judge had concerns about their convictions.

On October 11, McGuire read notes that Majczek had written in prison. In these, Majczek stated that following his conviction, the trial judge, Charles P. Molthrop, told Majczek that he believed a miscarriage of justice had occurred and promised him a new trial. Additionally, Majczek stated that a certain James Zagata witnessed Molthrop's admission. Zagata was a witness to the murder and believed the wrong men had been convicted.

McGuire was uncertain of the veracity of a judge having a private conversation with a convicted murderer—especially one convicted of killing a policeman. But no retrial had taken place, as Judge Molthrop died in 1935. McGuire went in search of Zagata and located him, still employed as a coal truck driver and very cooperative. Zagata fully corroborated Majczek's account of the conversation in Molthrop's chambers.

Zagata had been presented with a police lineup including Majczek but had been unable to positively identify Majczek. He restated this at the later trial. Subsequently, Zagata told the Times, he thought neither of the convicted men fit his recollection of the killers. He was certain that the true killers had been much taller than the short-statured Majczek. Zagata also said that Judge Molthrop had requested him a few days after the verdict—the judge was particularly interested in Zagata's issues with the identification. Zagata recalled the judge's saying he was going to get a retrial for the two men.

== Prohibition and politics ==
In the following days, the Times disclosed that Vera Walush, whose testimony had been the sole evidence against Majczek and the principal evidence against Marcinkiewicz, had initially not recognized either man during the police lineup. The paper also reported that Walush had been running a speakeasy and that she had been threatened with arrest if she refused to testify against Majczek and Marcinkiewicz. They also reported that the reason Judge Molthrop had failed to grant the defendants new trials was that he had been warned by prosecutors that granting a new trial would end his career in politics.

Cop killings often led to strong pressure for a conviction, especially with the spiraling murder rate of Prohibition-era Chicago. The same week Officer Lundy had been killed, there were five other unsolved murders in Chicago.

== Falsified records ==
Further digging led McGuire to learn how Majczek and Marcinkiewicz had become suspects. Vera Walush had initially been unable to identify the killer, but after hours of interrogation, she said one of them could have been a man she knew only as Ted. Police believed this to be a local man, Theodore Marcinkiewicz, and he became a prime suspect but could not be located. Two weeks after the crime, a bootlegger was arrested, and in exchange for not being charged, he told police that Marcinkiewicz had been staying with the Majczek family. The police raided the Majczek home on December 22, 1932, and though Marcinkiewicz wasn't there, they took Joseph Majczek into custody.

Majczek asserted that Vera Walush had not identified him in two separate lineups on December 22, but by December 23 Walush was able to positively identify him. The police then wrote a false report stating that Majczek had been arrested on December 23, the day Walush had identified him. Walush later positively identified Marcinkiewicz when he surrendered on January 23, 1933.

== Walker Butler ==
McGuire located the original arrest report corroborating Majczek's contention that he had been arrested on December 22. When the State's Attorney's Office refused to reopen the case based on McGuire's new evidence, the Times hired well-known lawyer Walker Butler to seek a pardon for Majczek, ignoring the similarly situated Marcinkiewicz.

In addition to claims that Majczek appeared to have been framed, Butler also developed a substantial claim that Majczek's trial attorney, W.W. O'Brien, had performed incompetently. Key witnesses of dubious credibility provided damaging testimony against Marcinkiewicz. One of these, Bessie Barron, claimed Marcinkiewicz had told her he was going to rob Walush's speakeasy. The other, Bruno Uginchus, testified that after the murder Marcinkiewicz said "he had a little trouble." Whilst neither of these statements related to Majczek, O'Brien failed to object to their admission. O'Brien also failed to cross-examine Vera Walush on her initial inability to identify him. These issues had not been raised on appeal because O'Brien handled it as well.

== Exoneration ==
On August 15, 1945, Majczek received a full pardon based on innocence from Illinois Governor Dwight H. Green. However, Marcinkiewicz remained locked up. He was legally exonerated through a state habeas corpus proceeding in 1950. Life Magazine photographed Majczek, Marcinkiewicz, and McGuire all leaving the jailhouse together.

Both men were later compensated by special appropriations — $24,000 for Majczek and $35,000 for Marcinkiewicz.

Majczek died in 1983 aged 73.

== See also ==
- List of wrongful convictions in the United States
